= Edvard Munch =

Norwegian painter (1863–1944)

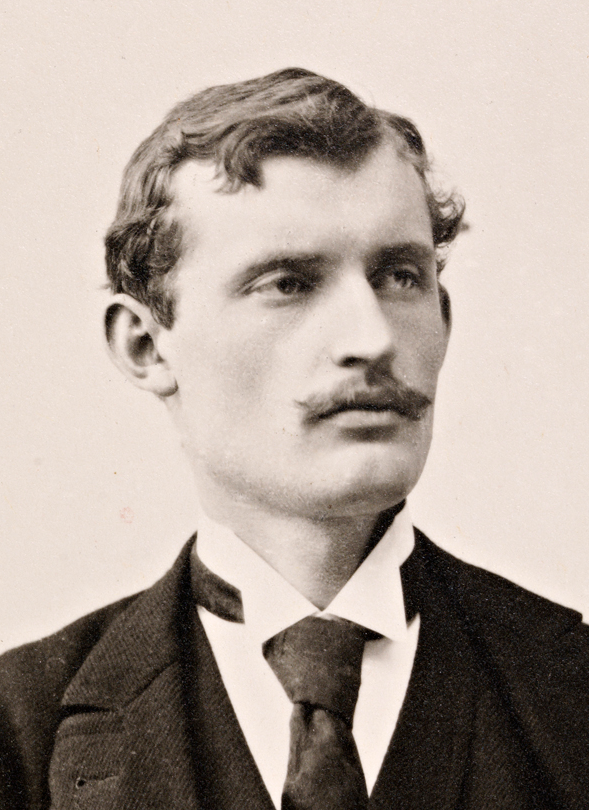
- Munch c. 1889
- Born: 12 December 1863; Ådalsbruk, Løten, Norway
- Died: 23 January 1944 (aged 80); Oslo, Norway
- Known for: Painting and graphic artist
- Notable work: The Scream; Madonna; The Sick Child
- Movement: Symbolism, Expressionism

Edvard Munch (/mʊŋk/ MUUNK; Norwegian: [ˈɛ̀dvɑɖ ˈmʊŋk]; 12 December 1863 – 23 January 1944) was a Norwegian painter. His 1893 work The Scream has become one of the most iconic and acclaimed images in all of Western art.

Munch's childhood was overshadowed by illness, bereavement and the dread of inheriting a mental condition that ran in the family. Studying at the Royal School of Art and Design in Kristiania (Oslo), Munch began to live a bohemian life under the influence of the nihilist Hans Jæger, who urged him to paint his own emotional and psychological state ('soul painting'); from this emerged his distinctive style.

Travel brought new influences and outlets. In Paris, he learned much from Paul Gauguin, Vincent van Gogh and Henri de Toulouse-Lautrec, especially their use of color. In Berlin, he met the Swedish dramatist August Strindberg, whom he painted, as he embarked on a major series of paintings he later called The Frieze of Life, depicting a series of deeply felt themes such as love, anxiety, jealousy and betrayal, steeped in atmosphere.

The Scream was conceived in Kristiania. According to Munch, he was out walking at sunset, when he 'heard the enormous, infinite scream of nature'. The painting's agonized face is widely identified with the angst of the modern person. Between 1893 and 1910, he made two painted versions and two in pastels, as well as a number of prints. One of the pastels eventually commanded the fourth highest nominal price paid for a painting at auction.

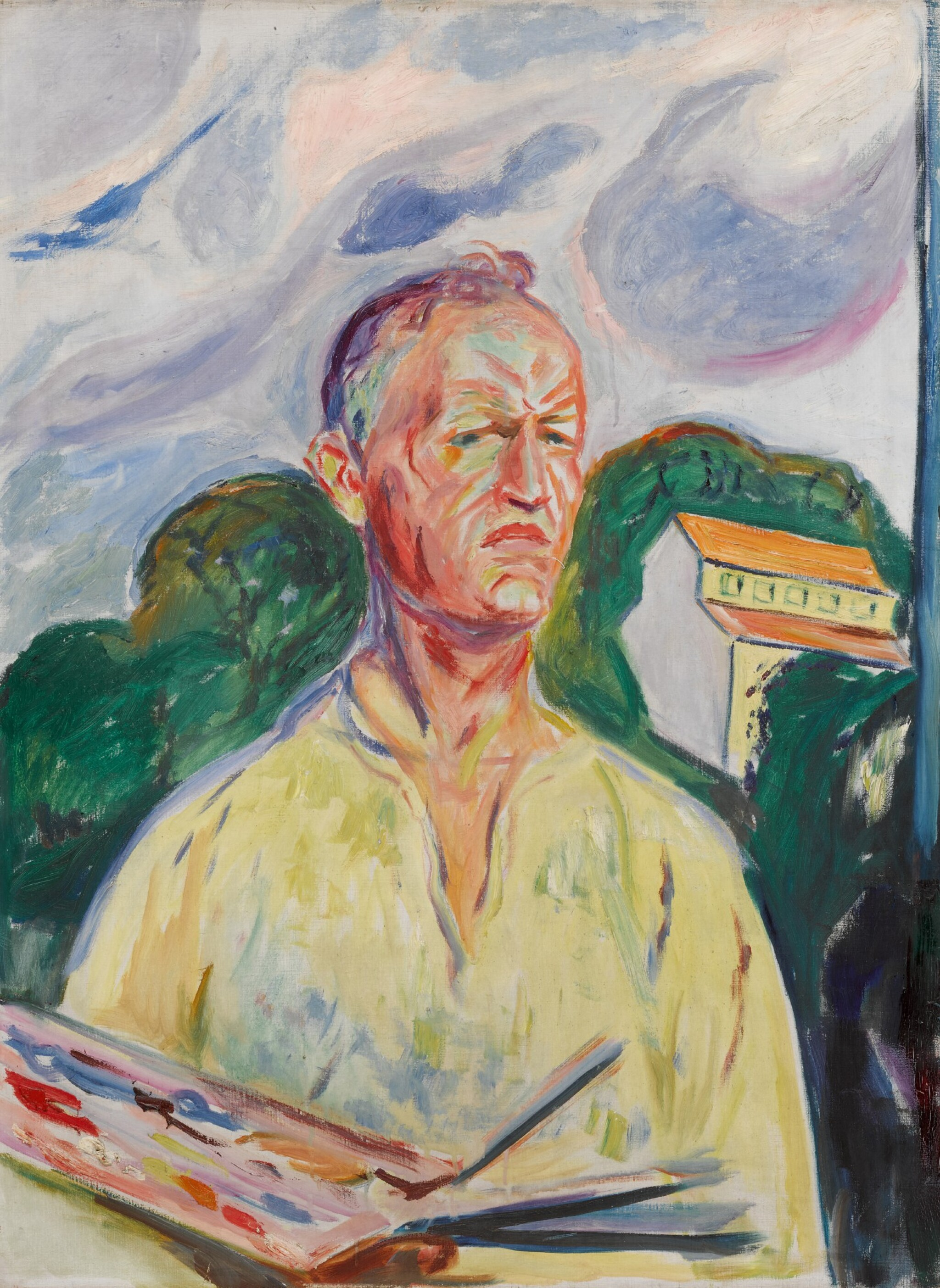
Self-Portrait with Palette (1926). On view at the Clark Art Institute

As his fame and wealth grew, his emotional state remained insecure. He briefly considered marriage, but could not commit himself. A mental breakdown in 1908 forced him to give up heavy drinking, and he was cheered by his increasing acceptance by the people of Kristiania and exposure in the city's museums. His later years were spent working in peace and privacy. Although his works were banned in Nazi-occupied Europe, most of them survived World War II, securing his legacy.

Munch displayed a remarkable talent for drawing from an early age, yet he received minimal formal artistic training. A pivotal influence on his artistic growth was his association with the Kristiania Bohème—a progressive circle of writers and artists in Kristiania (the former name of Oslo). The group's members championed free love and openly rejected the narrow-minded conventions of bourgeois society. Among the more established painters in this circle, Christian Krohg provided Munch with valuable instruction as well as ongoing encouragement and support.

Edvard Munch was highly active in the fields of graphic art and printmaking, producing a substantial body of work using intaglio techniques—such as etching, drypoint, and aquatint—on copper plates. Beginning in 1894, he embarked on engraving directly onto copper and, largely self-taught and without formal instruction, created numerous masterpieces in this medium.

== Life ==
=== Childhood ===
Edvard Munch was born in 1863 in a farmhouse in the village of Ådalsbruk in Løten, Norway to Laura Catherine Bjølstad and Christian Munch, the son of a priest. Christian was a doctor and medical officer who married Laura, a woman half his age, in 1861. Edvard had an elder sister, Johanne Sophie, and three younger siblings: Peter Andreas, Laura Catherine, and Inger Marie. Laura was artistically talented and may have encouraged Edvard and Sophie. Edvard was related to the painter Jacob Munch and the historian Peter Andreas Munch.

The family moved to Oslo (then called Christiania and renamed Kristiania in 1877) in 1864 when Christian Munch was appointed medical officer at Akershus Fortress. In 1868 Edvard's mother died of tuberculosis. Munch's favourite sister, Johanne Sophie, also died of tuberculosis, at the age of 15, in 1877. After their mother's death, the Munch siblings were raised by their father and by their aunt Karen. Often ill for much of the winters and kept out of school, Edvard drew to keep himself occupied. He was tutored by his schoolmates and his aunt. Christian Munch also instructed his son in history and literature, and entertained the children with vivid ghost stories and the tales of the American writer Edgar Allan Poe.

As Edvard remembered it, Christian's positive behavior towards his children was overshadowed by his morbid pietism. Munch wrote, "My father was temperamentally nervous and obsessively religious—to the point of psychoneurosis. From him I inherited the seeds of madness. The angels of fear, sorrow, and death stood by my side since the day I was born." Christian reprimanded his children by telling them that their mother was looking down from heaven and grieving over their misbehavior. The father's obsessions, Edvard's poor health, and the vivid ghost stories helped inspire his macabre visions and nightmares; he felt that death was constantly approaching. One of Munch's younger sisters, Laura, was diagnosed with mental illness at an early age. Of the five siblings, only Andreas married, but he died a few months after the wedding. Munch later wrote "I inherited two of mankind's most frightful enemies—the heritage of consumption and insanity".

Christian Munch's military pay was very low, and his attempts to develop a private side practice failed, keeping his family in genteel but perennial poverty. They moved frequently from one cheap flat to another. Munch's early drawings and watercolors depicted these interiors, and the individual objects, such as medicine bottles and drawing implements, plus some landscapes. By his teens, art dominated Munch's interests. At 13, Munch had his first exposure to other artists at the newly formed Art Association, where he admired the work of the Norwegian landscape school. He returned to copy the paintings, and soon he began to paint in oils.

=== Health ===
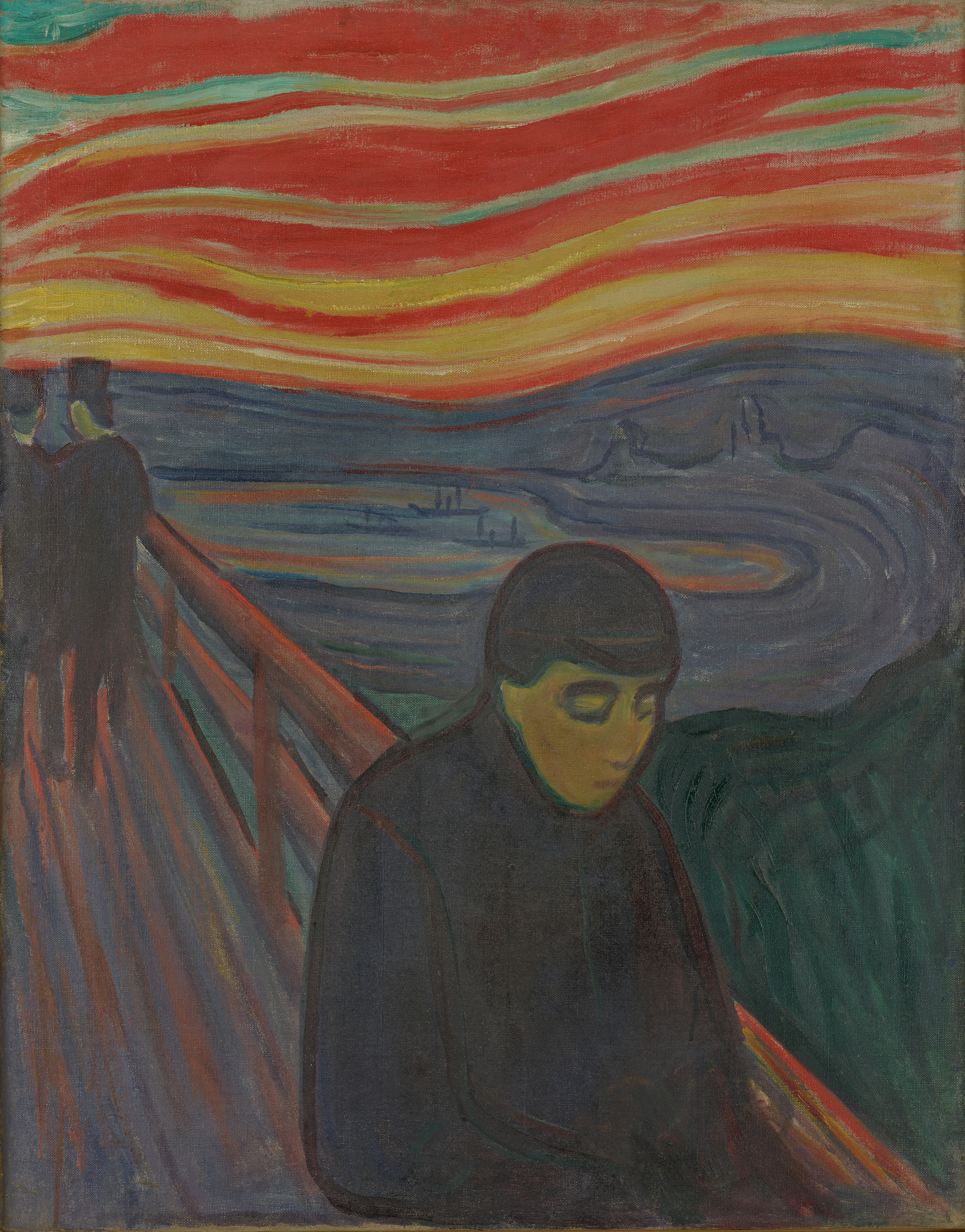
Despair by Edvard Munch (1894) displays emotion that could be seen as related to dissociation or depression in borderline personality disorder.

Due in part to the mental health struggles and incarceration in an institution of his sister, Laura Catherine, and in part to then-prevailing beliefs in hereditary insanity, Edvard Munch often expressed his fear that he would become insane. Critics of his art also accused him of insanity, deploying this term in a purely abusive sense. When his painting The Sick Child was first displayed in Oslo in 1886, Gustav Wentzel and other young Realists encircled Munch and accused him of being a "madman"; another critic Johan Scharffenberg stated that because Munch derived from an "insane family" his art was also "insane." Later in his life, he was diagnosed with bipolar disorder and depression. Munch also displayed alcoholism, a trait often associated with impulsivity in borderline personality disorder.

=== Studies and influences ===
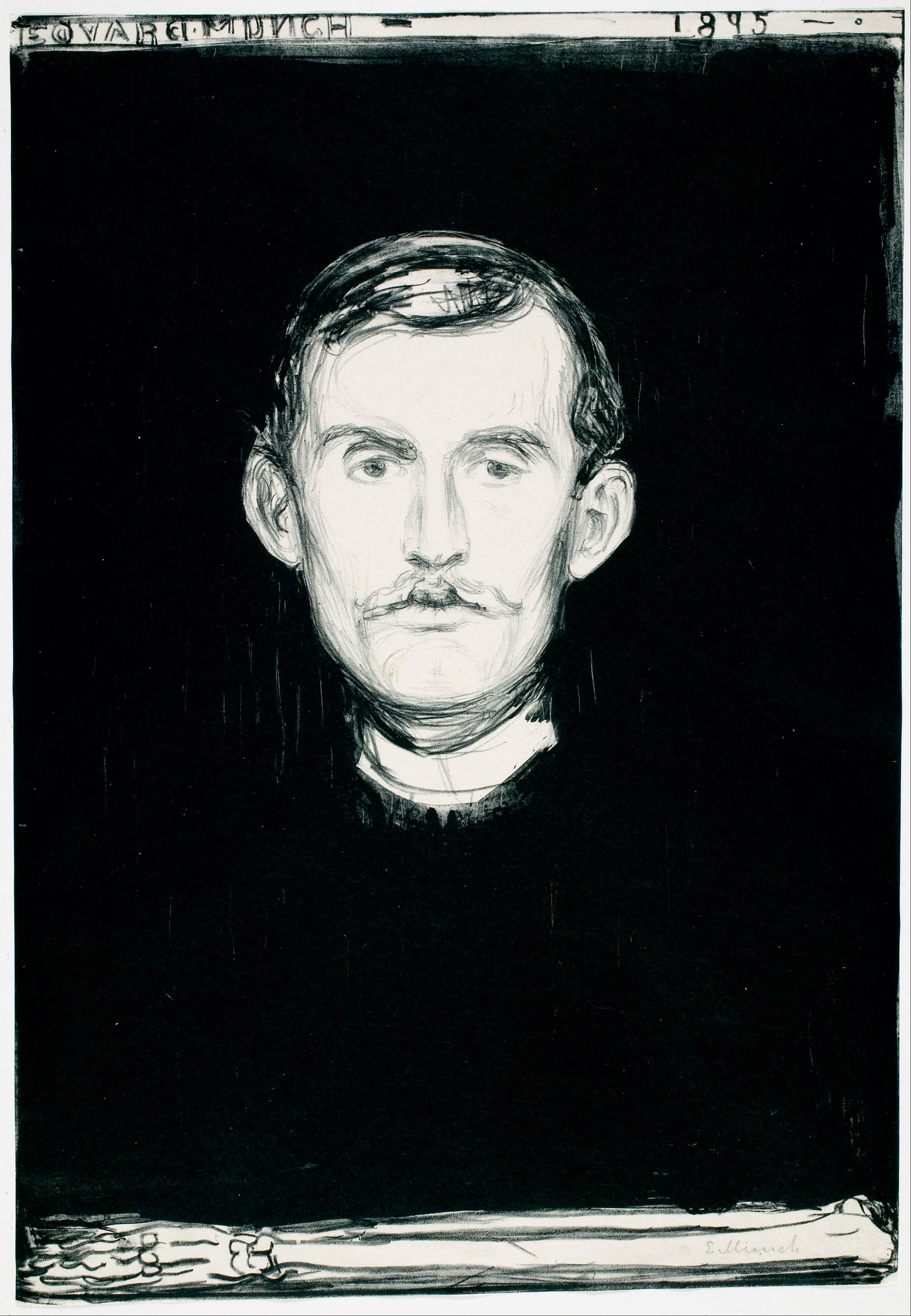
Self-Portrait with Skeleton Arm, 1895, Munch Museum, Oslo

In 1879, Munch enrolled in a technical college to study engineering, where he excelled in physics, chemistry, and mathematics. He learned scaled and perspective drawing, but frequent illnesses interrupted his studies. The following year, much to his father's disappointment, Munch left the college determined to become a painter. His father viewed art as an "unholy trade", and his neighbors reacted bitterly and sent him anonymous letters. In contrast to his father's rabid pietism, Munch adopted an undogmatic stance towards art. He wrote his goal in his diary: "In my art I attempt to explain life and its meaning to myself."

In 1881, Munch enrolled at the Royal School of Art and Design of Kristiania, one of whose founders was his distant relative Jacob Munch. His teachers were the sculptor Julius Middelthun and the naturalistic painter Christian Krohg. That year, Munch demonstrated his quick absorption of his figure training at the academy in his first portraits, including one of his father and his first self-portrait. In 1883, Munch took part in his first public exhibition and shared a studio with other students. His full-length portrait of Karl Jensen-Hjell, a notorious bohemian-about-town, earned a critic's dismissive response: "It is impressionism carried to the extreme. It is a travesty of art." Munch's nude paintings from this period survive only in sketches, except for Standing Nude (1887). They may have been confiscated by his father.

Impressionism inspired Munch from a young age. During these early years, he experimented with many styles, including Naturalism and Impressionism. Some early works are reminiscent of Manet. Many of these attempts brought him unfavorable criticism from the press and garnered him constant rebukes by his father, who nonetheless provided him with small sums for living expenses. At one point, however, Munch's father, perhaps swayed by the negative opinion of Munch's cousin Edvard Diriks (an established, traditional painter), destroyed at least one painting (likely a nude) and refused to advance any more money for art supplies.

Munch also received his father's ire for his relationship with Hans Jæger, the local nihilist who lived by the code "a passion to destroy is also a creative passion" and who advocated suicide as the ultimate way to freedom. Munch came under his malevolent, anti-establishment spell. "My ideas developed under the influence of the bohemians or rather under Hans Jæger. Many people have mistakenly claimed that my ideas were formed under the influence of Strindberg and the Germans ... but that is wrong. They had already been formed by then." At that time, contrary to many of the other bohemians, Munch was still respectful of women, as well as reserved and well-mannered, but he began to give in to the binge drinking and brawling of his circle. He was unsettled by the sexual revolution going on at the time and by the independent women around him. He later turned cynical concerning sexual matters, expressed not only in his behavior and his art, but in his writings as well, an example being a long poem called The City of Free Love.

After numerous experiments, Munch concluded that the Impressionist idiom did not allow sufficient expression. He found it superficial and too akin to scientific experimentation. He felt a need to go deeper and explore situations brimming with emotional content and expressive energy. Under Jæger's commandment that Munch should "write his life", meaning that Munch should explore his own emotional and psychological state, the young artist began a period of reflection and self-examination, recording his thoughts in his "soul's diary". This deeper perspective helped move him to a new view of his art. He wrote that his painting The Sick Child (1886), based on his sister's death, was his first "soul painting", his first break from Impressionism. The painting received a negative response from critics and from his family, and caused another "violent outburst of moral indignation" from the community.

Only his friend Christian Krohg defended him:

He paints, or rather regards, things in a way that is different from that of other artists. He sees only the essential, and that, naturally, is all he paints. For this reason Munch's pictures are as a rule "not complete", as people are so delighted to discover for themselves. Oh, yes, they are complete. His complete handiwork. Art is complete once the artist has really said everything that was on his mind, and this is precisely the advantage Munch has over painters of the other generation, that he really knows how to show us what he has felt, and what has gripped him, and to this he subordinates everything else.

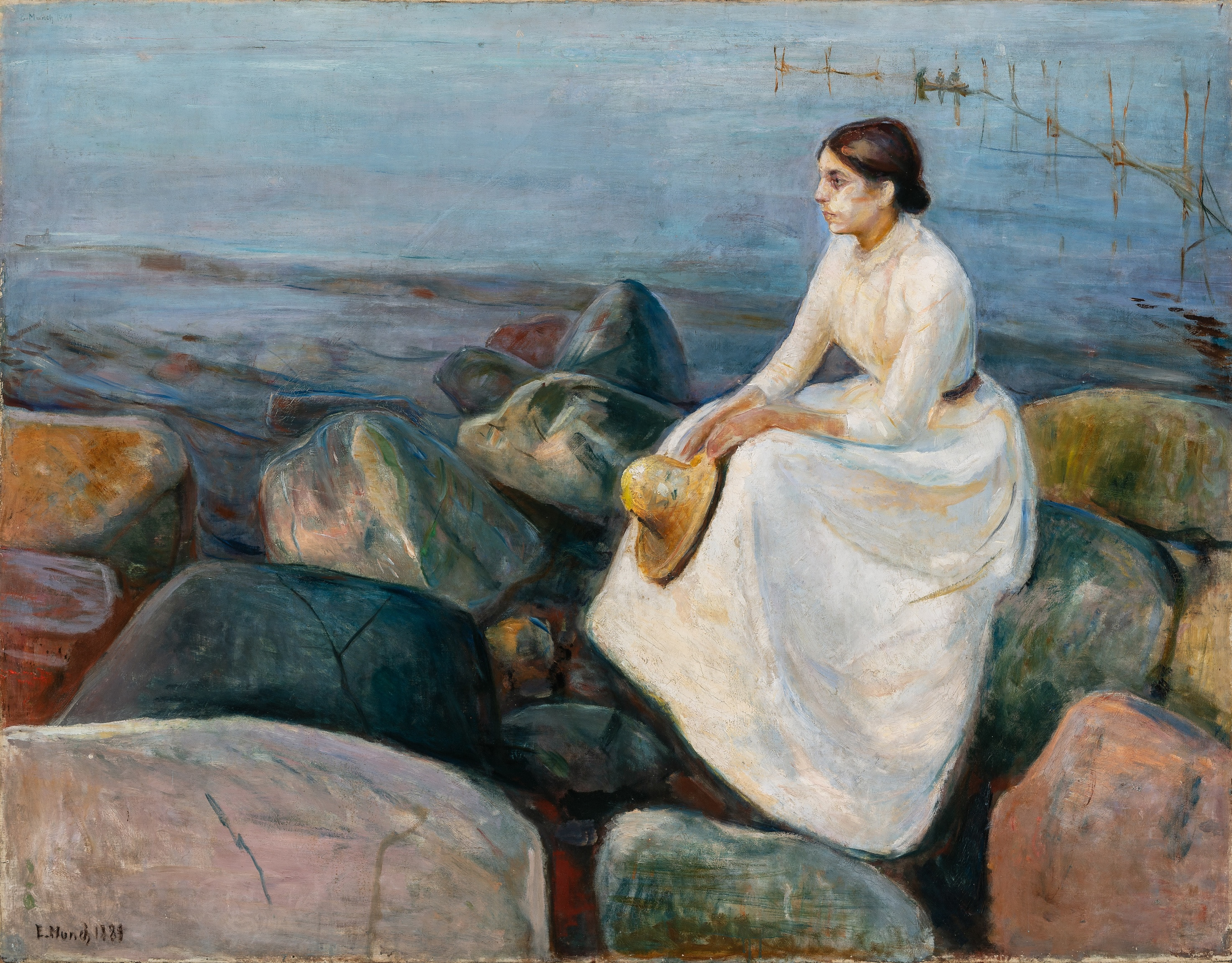
Inger on the Beach, 1889, Bergen Kunstmuseum

Munch continued to employ a variety of brushstroke techniques and color palettes throughout the 1880s and early 1890s, as he struggled to define his style. His idiom continued to veer between naturalistic, as seen in Portrait of Hans Jæger, and impressionistic, as in Rue Lafayette. His Inger on the Beach (1889), which caused another storm of confusion and controversy, hints at the simplified forms, heavy outlines, sharp contrasts, and emotional content of his mature style to come. He began to carefully calculate his compositions to create tension and emotion. While stylistically influenced by the Post-Impressionists, what evolved was a subject matter which was symbolist in content, depicting a state of mind rather than an external reality. In 1889, Munch presented his first one-man show of nearly all his works to date. The recognition it received led to a two-year state scholarship to study in Paris under French painter Léon Bonnat.

Munch seems to have been an early critic of photography as an art form, and remarked that it "will never compete with the brush and the palette, until such time as photographs can be taken in Heaven or Hell!"

Munch's younger sister Laura was the subject of his 1899 interior Melancholy: Laura. Amanda O'Neill says of the work, "In this heated claustrophobic scene Munch not only portrays Laura's tragedy, but his own dread of the madness he might have inherited."

=== Paris ===
Munch arrived in Paris during the festivities of the Exposition Universelle (1889) and roomed with two fellow Norwegian artists. His picture Morning (1884) was displayed at the Norwegian pavilion. He spent his mornings at Bonnat's busy studio (which included female models) and afternoons at the exhibition, galleries, and museums (where students were expected to make copies as a way of learning technique and observation). Munch recorded little enthusiasm for Bonnat's drawing lessons—"It tires and bores me—it's numbing"—but enjoyed the master's commentary during museum trips.

Munch was enthralled by the vast display of modern European art, including the works of three artists who proved influential: Paul Gauguin, Vincent van Gogh, and Henri de Toulouse-Lautrec—all notable for how they used color to convey emotion. Munch was particularly inspired by Gauguin's "reaction against realism" and his credo that "art was human work and not an imitation of Nature", a belief earlier stated by Whistler. As one of his Berlin friends said later of Munch, "he need not make his way to Tahiti to see and experience the primitive in human nature. He carries his own Tahiti within him." Influenced by Gauguin, as well as the etchings of German artist Max Klinger, Munch experimented with prints as a medium to create graphic versions of his works. In 1896 he created his first woodcuts—a medium that proved ideal to Munch's symbolic imagery. Together with his contemporary Nikolai Astrup, Munch is considered an innovator of the woodcut medium in Norway.

In December 1889 his father died, leaving Munch's family destitute. He returned home and arranged a large loan from a wealthy Norwegian collector when wealthy relatives failed to help, and assumed financial responsibility for his family from then on. Christian's death depressed him and he was plagued by suicidal thoughts: "I live with the dead—my mother, my sister, my grandfather, my father...Kill yourself and then it's over. Why live?" Munch's paintings of the following year included sketchy tavern scenes and a series of bright cityscapes in which he experimented with the pointillist style of Georges Seurat.

=== Berlin ===
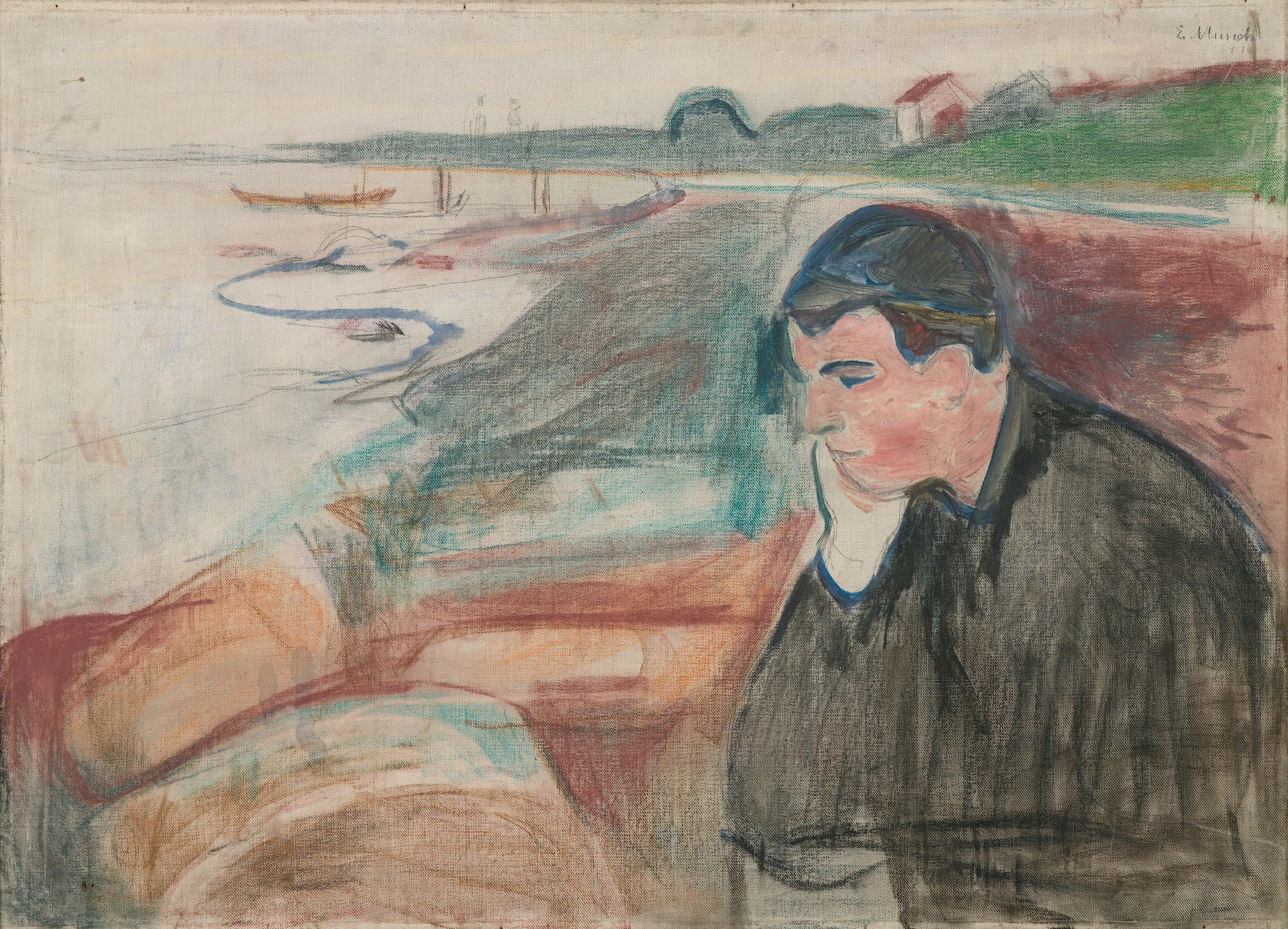
Melancholy, 1891, oil, pencil and crayon on canvas, 73 × 101 cm, Munch Museum, Oslo

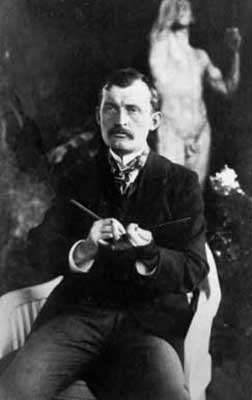
Munch in 1902, in the garden of his patron Max Linde in Lübeck; in the background is a cast of Auguste Rodin's sculpture The Age of Bronze

By 1892, Munch had formulated his own characteristic, and original, synthetist style, as seen in Melancholy (1891), in which color is the symbol-laden element. Considered by the artist and journalist Christian Krohg as the first symbolist painting by a Norwegian artist, Melancholy was exhibited in 1891 at the Autumn Exhibition in Oslo. In 1892, Adelsteen Normann, on behalf of the Union of Berlin Artists, invited Munch to exhibit at its November exhibition, the society's first one-man exhibition. However, his paintings evoked bitter controversy (dubbed "The Munch Affair"), and after one week the exhibition closed. Munch was pleased with the "great commotion", and wrote in a letter: "Never have I had such an amusing time—it's incredible that something as innocent as painting should have created such a stir."

In Berlin, Munch became involved in an international circle of writers, artists and critics, including the Swedish dramatist and leading intellectual August Strindberg, whom he painted in 1892. He also met Danish writer and painter Holger Drachmann, whom he painted in 1898. Drachmann was 17 years Munch's senior and a drinking companion at Zum schwarzen Ferkel (At the Black Piglet) in 1893–94. In 1894 Drachmann wrote of Munch: "He struggles hard. Good luck with your struggles, lonely Norwegian."

During his four years in Berlin, Munch sketched out most of the ideas that comprised his major work, The Frieze of Life, first designed for book illustration but later expressed in paintings. He sold little, but made some income from charging entrance fees to view his controversial paintings. Munch began allowing the appearance of drips in his paintings, as first subtly seen in the painted version of "At the Deathbed" (1895). This effect resulted from the use of highly diluted paint and the deliberate inclusion of drips. Initially, this effect was visible at the edges of his work, but later, the drips became more central, as seen in "By the Deathbed" (1915). The effect of running paint was later adopted by many artists.

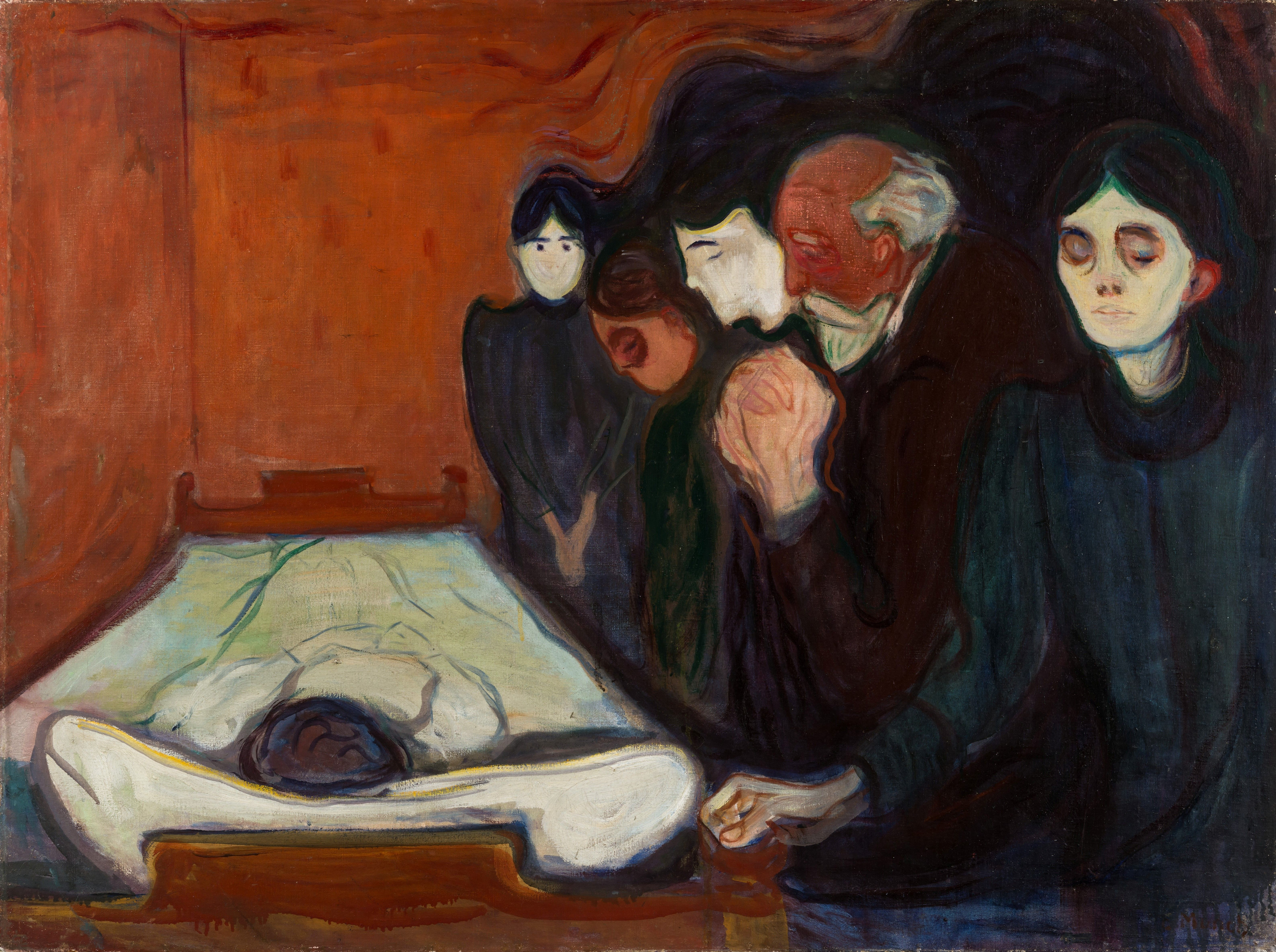
At the Deathbed, 1895, Bergen Kunstmuseum

His other paintings, including casino scenes, show a simplification of form and detail which marked his early mature style. Munch also began to favor a shallow pictorial space and a minimal backdrop for his frontal figures. Since poses were chosen to produce the most convincing images of states of mind and psychological conditions, as in Ashes, the figures impart a monumental, static quality. Munch's figures appear to play roles on a theatre stage (Death in the Sick-Room), whose pantomime of fixed postures signify various emotions; since each character embodies a single psychological dimension, as in The Scream, Munch's men and women began to appear more symbolic than realistic. He wrote "No longer should interiors be painted, people reading and women knitting: there would be living people, breathing and feeling, suffering and loving."

=== The Scream ===
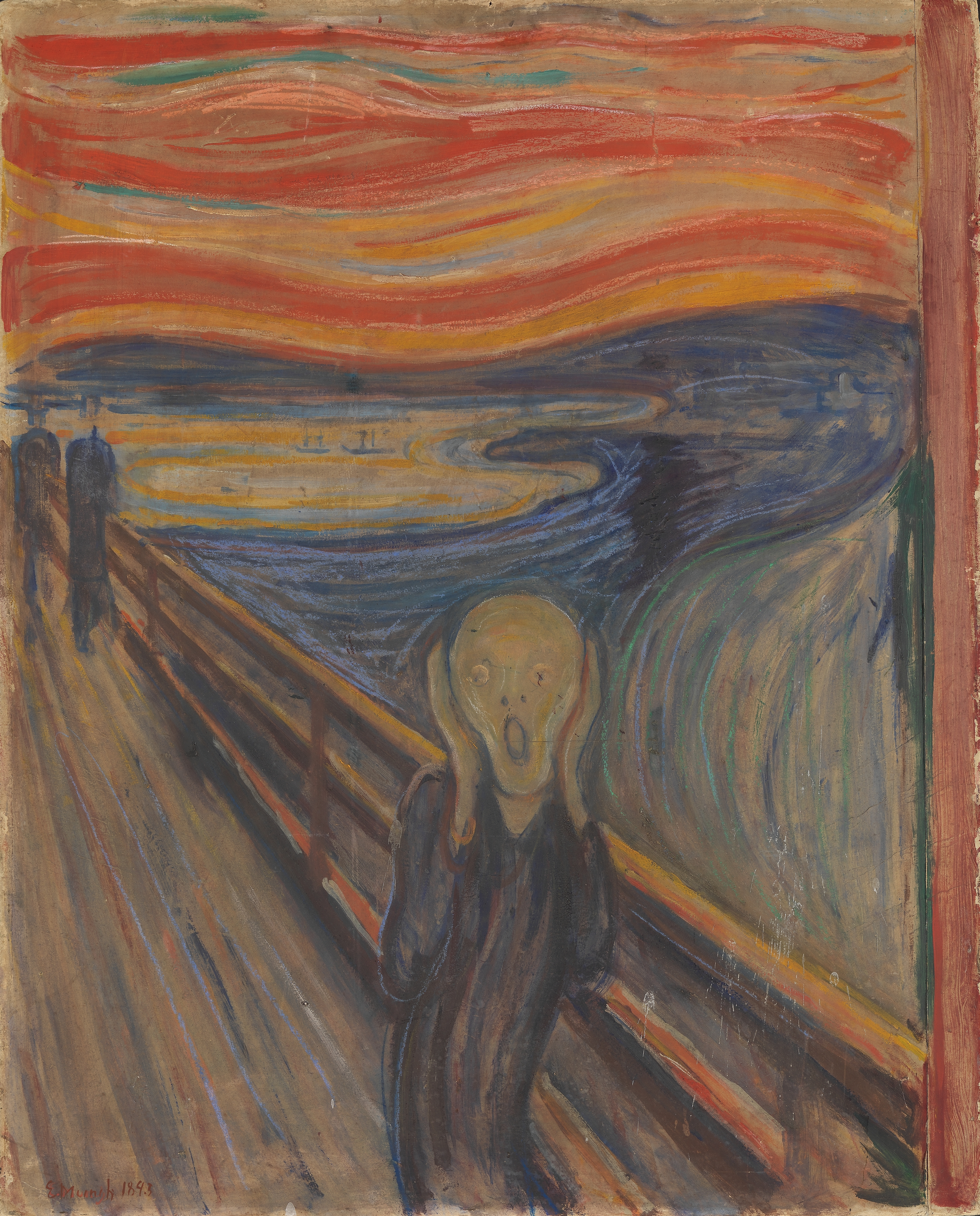
The Scream (1893), National Gallery, Oslo

The Scream exists in four versions: two pastels (1893 and 1895) and two paintings (1893 and 1910). There are also several lithographs of The Scream (1895 and later).

The 1895 pastel sold at auction on 2 May 2012 for US$119,922,500, including commission. It is the most colorful of the versions and is distinctive for the downward-looking stance of one of its background figures. It is also the only version not held by a Norwegian museum.

The 1893 version was stolen from the National Gallery in Oslo in 1994 and was recovered. The 1910 painting was stolen in 2004 from the Munch Museum in Oslo, but recovered in 2006 with limited damage.

The Scream is Munch's most famous work, and one of the most recognizable paintings in all art. It has been widely interpreted as representing the universal anxiety of modern man. Painted with broad bands of garish color and highly simplified forms, and employing a high viewpoint, it reduces the agonized figure to a garbed skull in the throes of an emotional crisis.

With this painting, Munch met his stated goal of "the study of the soul, that is to say the study of my own self". Munch wrote of how the painting came to be: "I was walking down the road with two friends when the sun set; suddenly, the sky turned as red as blood. I stopped and leaned against the fence, feeling unspeakably tired. Tongues of fire and blood stretched over the bluish black fjord. My friends went on walking, while I lagged behind, shivering with fear. Then I heard the enormous, infinite scream of nature." He later described the personal anguish behind the painting, "for several years I was almost mad... You know my picture, 'The Scream?' I was stretched to the limit—nature was screaming in my blood... After that I gave up hope ever of being able to love again."

In 2003, comparing the painting with other great works, art historian Martha Tedeschi wrote:

Whistler's Mother, Wood's American Gothic, Leonardo da Vinci's Mona Lisa and Edvard Munch's The Scream have all achieved something that most paintings—regardless of their art historical importance, beauty, or monetary value—have not: they communicate a specific meaning almost immediately to almost every viewer. These few works have successfully made the transition from the elite realm of the museum visitor to the enormous venue of popular culture.

=== Frieze of Life – A Poem about Life, Love and Death ===
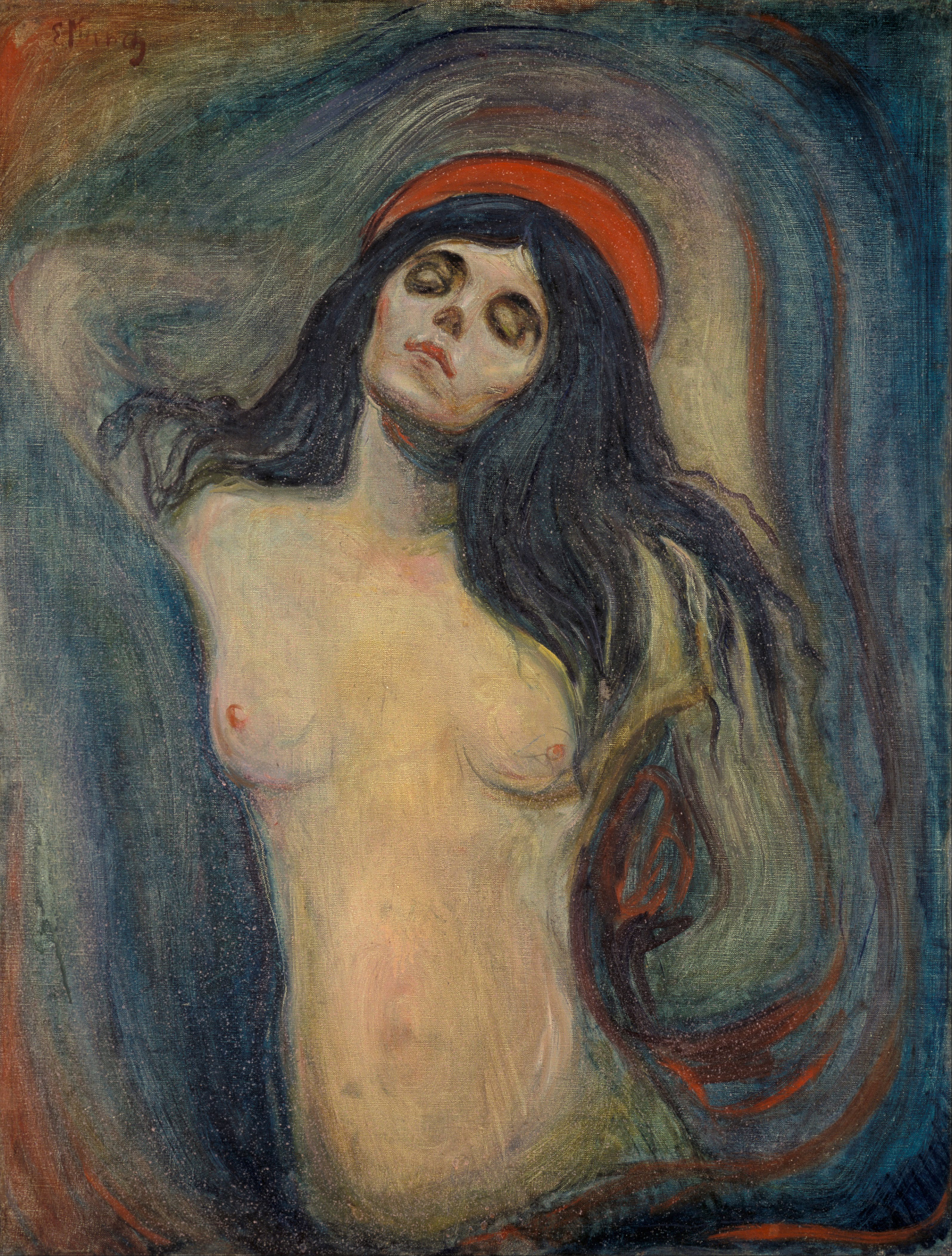
Although it is a highly unusual representation, this painting might be of the Virgin Mary. Whether the painting is specifically intended as a representation of Mary is disputed. Munch used more than one title, including both Loving Woman and Madonna. (Note: Munch is not famous for religious artwork and was not known as a Christian. The affinity to Mary might be intended nevertheless, as an emphasis on the beauty and perfection of his friend Dagny Juel-Przybyszewska, the model for the work, and an expression of his worship of her as an ideal of womanhood.(1894, oil on canvas, 90 cm × 68 cm (35 1/2 in × 26 3/4 in), Munch Museum, Oslo))

In December 1893, Unter den Linden in Berlin was the location of an exhibition of Munch's work, showing, among other pieces, six paintings entitled Study for a Series: Love. This began a cycle he later called the Frieze of Life – A Poem about Life, Love and Death. Frieze of Life motifs, such as The Storm and Moonlight, are steeped in atmosphere. Other motifs illuminate the nocturnal side of love, such as Rose and Amelie and Love and Pain. In Death in the Sickroom, the subject is the death of his sister Sophie, which he re-worked in many future variations. The dramatic focus of the painting, portraying his entire family, is dispersed in the separate and disconnected figures of sorrow. In 1894, he enlarged the spectrum of motifs by adding Anxiety, Ashes, Madonna, and Women in Three Stages (from innocence to old age).

Around the start of the 20th century, Munch worked to finish the "Frieze". He painted a number of pictures, several of them in bigger format and to some extent featuring the Art Nouveau aesthetics of the time. He made a wooden frame with carved reliefs for the large painting Metabolism (1898), initially called Adam and Eve. This work reveals Munch's pre-occupation with the "fall of man" and his pessimistic philosophy of love. Motifs such as The Empty Cross and Golgotha (both c. 1900) reflect a metaphysical orientation, and also reflect Munch's pietistic upbringing. The entire Frieze was shown for the first time at the secessionist exhibition in Berlin in 1902.

"The Frieze of Life" themes recur throughout Munch's work but he especially focused on them in the mid-1890s. In sketches, paintings, pastels and prints, he tapped the depths of his feelings to examine his major motifs: the stages of life, the femme fatale, the hopelessness of love, anxiety, infidelity, jealousy, sexual humiliation, and separation in life and death. These themes are expressed in paintings such as The Sick Child (1885), Love and Pain (retitled Vampire; 1893–94), Ashes (1894), and The Bridge. The latter shows limp figures with featureless or hidden faces, over which loom the threatening shapes of heavy trees and brooding houses. Munch portrayed women either as frail, innocent sufferers (see Puberty and Love and Pain) or as the cause of great longing, jealousy and despair (see Separation, Jealousy, and Ashes).

Munch often uses shadows and rings of color around his figures to emphasize an aura of fear, menace, anxiety, or sexual intensity. These paintings have been interpreted as reflections of the artist's sexual anxieties, though it could also be argued that they represent his turbulent relationship with love itself and his general pessimism regarding human existence. Many of these sketches and paintings were done in several versions, such as Madonna, Hands and Puberty, and also transcribed as wood-block prints and lithographs. Munch hated to part with his paintings because he thought of his work as a single body of expression. So to capitalize on his production and make some income, he turned to graphic arts to reproduce many of his paintings, including those in this series. Munch admitted to the personal goals of his work but he also offered his art to a wider purpose, "My art is really a voluntary confession and an attempt to explain to myself my relationship with life—it is, therefore, actually a sort of egoism, but I am constantly hoping that through this I can help others achieve clarity."

While attracting strongly negative reactions, in the 1890s Munch began to receive some understanding of his artistic goals, as one critic wrote, "With ruthless contempt for form, clarity, elegance, wholeness, and realism, he paints with intuitive strength of talent the most subtle visions of the soul." One of his great supporters in Berlin was Walther Rathenau, later the German foreign minister, who strongly contributed to his success.

=== Landscapes and Nature ===
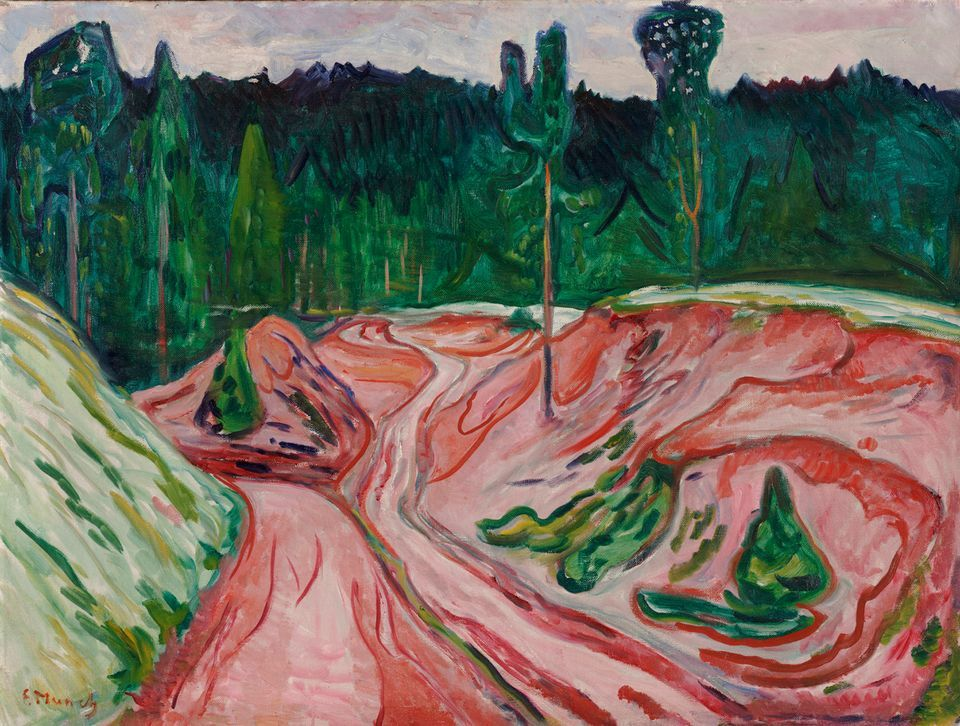
From Thuringerwald, 1905, oil on canvas. The work depicts a sinuous cut through the forest with a fleshy earth that harkens back to a physical connection to the viewer.

Despite over half of his painted works being landscapes, Munch is rarely seen as a landscape artist. However, Munch had a fixation on several elements of nature that resulted in recurrent motifs throughout his work. The shoreline and the forest are both significant settings of Munch's work. A focus on Munch's use of nature to convey emotion is the topic of Edvard Munch: Trembling Earth at the Clark Art Institute.

=== Paris, Berlin and Kristiania ===
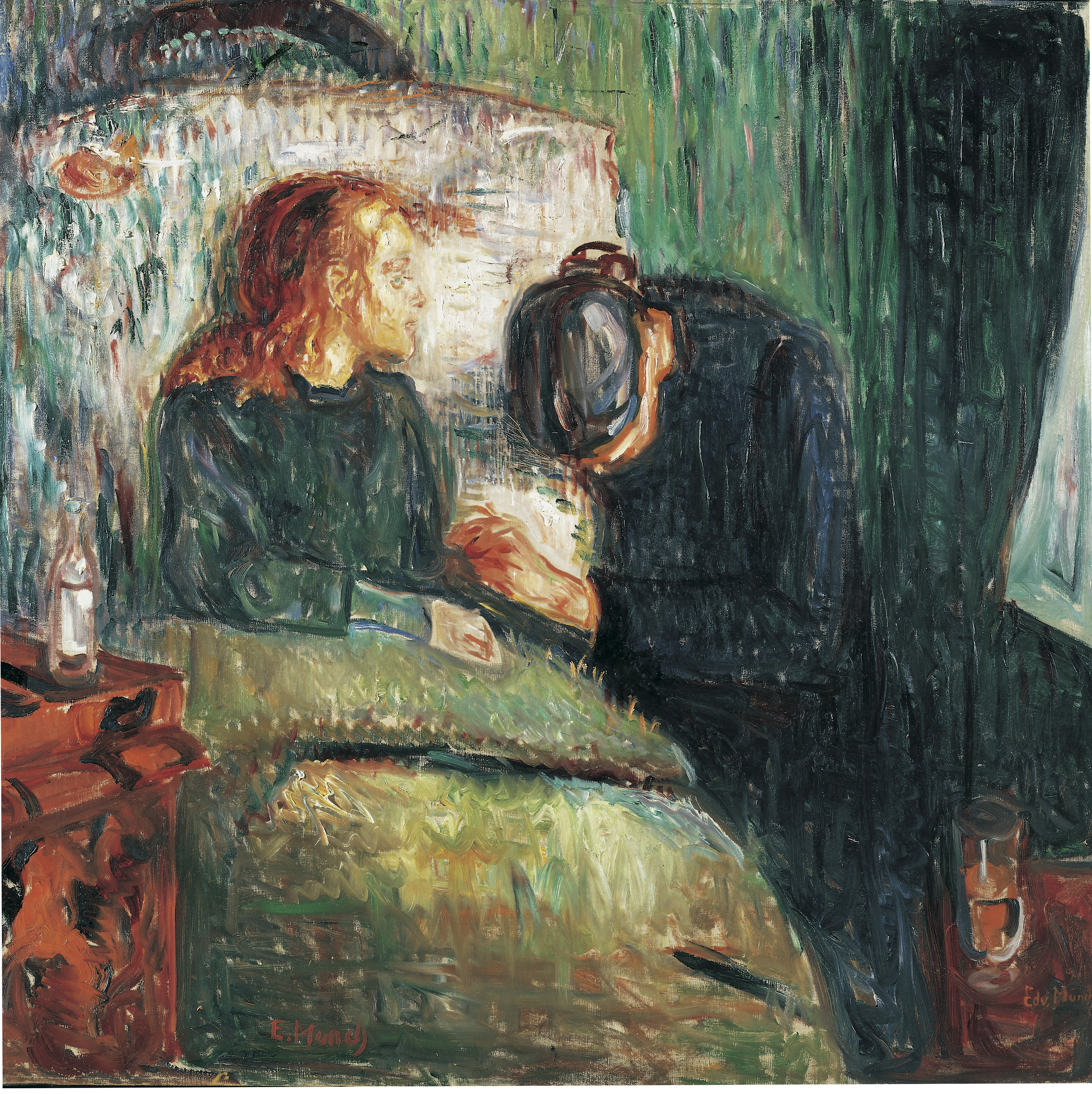
The Sick Child (1907)

In 1896, Munch moved to Paris, where he focused on graphic representations of his Frieze of Life themes. He further developed his woodcut and lithographic technique. Munch's Self-Portrait with Skeleton Arm (1895) is done with an etching needle-and-ink method also used by Paul Klee. Munch also produced multi-colored versions of The Sick Child, concerning tuberculosis, which sold well, as well as several nudes and multiple versions of Kiss (1892). In May 1896, Siegfried Bing held an exhibition of Munch's work inside Bing's Maison de l'Art Nouveau. The exhibition displayed 60 works, including The Kiss, The Scream, Madonna, The Sick Child, The Death Chamber, and The Day After. Bing's exhibition helped to introduce Munch to a French audience. Still, many of the Parisian critics still considered Munch's work "violent and brutal" even if his exhibitions received serious attention and good attendance. His financial situation improved considerably and, in 1897, Munch bought himself a summer house facing the fjords of Kristiania, a small fisherman's cabin built in the late 18th century, in the small town of Åsgårdstrand in Norway. He dubbed this home the "Happy House" and returned here almost every summer for the next 20 years. It was this place he missed when he was abroad and when he felt depressed and exhausted. "To walk in Åsgårdstrand is like walking among my paintings—I get so inspired to paint when I am here".

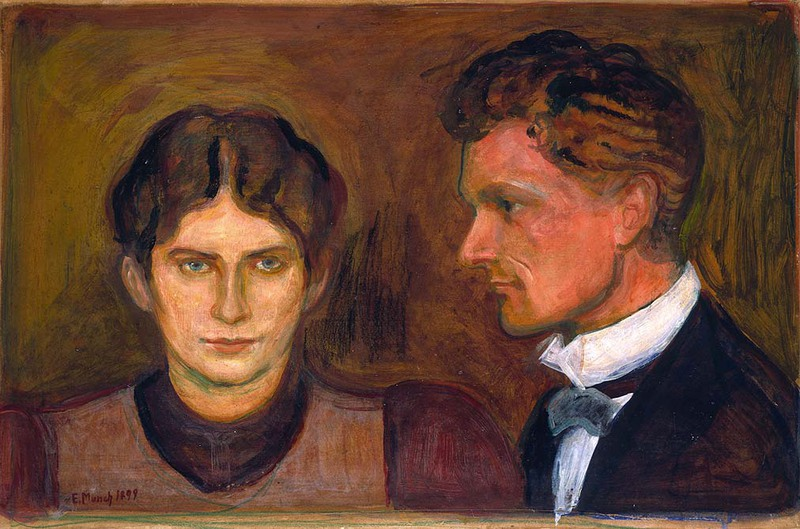
Harald Nørregaard (with his wife, painted by Munch in 1899, National Gallery) was one of Munch's closest friends since adolescence, and his adviser and lawyer.

In 1897 Munch returned to Kristiania, where he also received grudging acceptance—one critic wrote, "A fair number of these pictures have been exhibited before. In my opinion these improve on acquaintance." In 1899, Munch began an intimate relationship with Tulla Larsen, a "liberated" upper-class woman. They traveled to Italy together and upon returning, Munch began another fertile period in his art, which included landscapes and his final painting in "The Frieze of Life" series, The Dance of Life (1899). Larsen was eager for marriage, but Munch was not. His drinking and poor health reinforced his fears, as he wrote in the third person: "Ever since he was a child he had hated marriage. His sick and nervous home had given him the feeling that he had no right to get married." Munch almost gave in to Tulla, but fled from her in 1900, also turning away from her considerable fortune, and moved to Berlin. His Girls on the Jetty, created in 18 different versions, demonstrated the theme of feminine youth without negative connotations. In 1902, he displayed his works thematically at the hall of the Berlin Secession, producing "a symphonic effect—it made a great stir—a lot of antagonism—and a lot of approval." The Berlin critics were beginning to appreciate Munch's work even though the public still found his work alien and strange.

The good press coverage gained Munch the attention of influential patrons Albert Kollman and Max Linde. He described the turn of events in his diary, "After 20 years of struggle and misery forces of good finally come to my aid in Germany—and a bright door opens up for me." However, despite this positive change, Munch's self-destructive and erratic behavior led him first to a violent quarrel with another artist, then to an accidental shooting in the presence of Tulla Larsen, who had returned for a brief reconciliation, which injured two of his fingers. Munch later sawed a self-portrait depicting him and Larsen in half as a consequence of the shooting and subsequent events. She finally left him and married a younger colleague of Munch. Munch took this as a betrayal, and he dwelled on the humiliation for some time to come, channeling some of the bitterness into new paintings. His paintings Still Life (The Murderess) and The Death of Marat I, done in 1906–07, clearly reference the shooting incident and the emotional after-effects.

In 1903–04, Munch exhibited in Paris where the coming Fauvists, famous for their boldly false colors, likely saw his works and might have found inspiration in them. When the Fauves held their own exhibit in 1906, Munch was invited and displayed his works with theirs. After studying the sculpture of Rodin, Munch may have experimented with plasticine as an aid to design, but he produced little sculpture. During this time, Munch received many commissions for portraits and prints which improved his usually precarious financial condition. In 1906, he painted the screen for an Ibsen play in the small Kammerspiele Theatre located in Berlin's Deutsches Theater, in which the Frieze of Life was hung. The theatre's director Max Reinhardt later sold it; it is now in the Berlin Nationalgalerie. After an earlier period of landscapes, in 1907 he turned his attention again to human figures and situations.

=== Breakdown and recovery ===
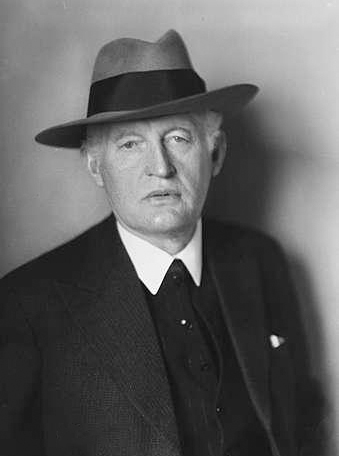
Munch in 1933

In the autumn of 1908, Munch's anxiety, compounded by excessive drinking and brawling, had become acute. As he later wrote, "My condition was verging on madness—it was touch and go." Subject to hallucinations and feelings of persecution, he entered the clinic of Daniel Jacobson. The therapy Munch received for the next eight months included diet and "electrification" (a treatment then fashionable for nervous conditions, not to be confused with electroconvulsive therapy). Munch's stay in hospital stabilized his personality, and after returning to Norway in 1909, his work became more colorful and less pessimistic. Further brightening his mood, the general public of Kristiania finally warmed to his work, and museums began to purchase his paintings. He was made a Knight of the Royal Order of St. Olav "for services in art". His first American exhibit was in 1912 in New York.

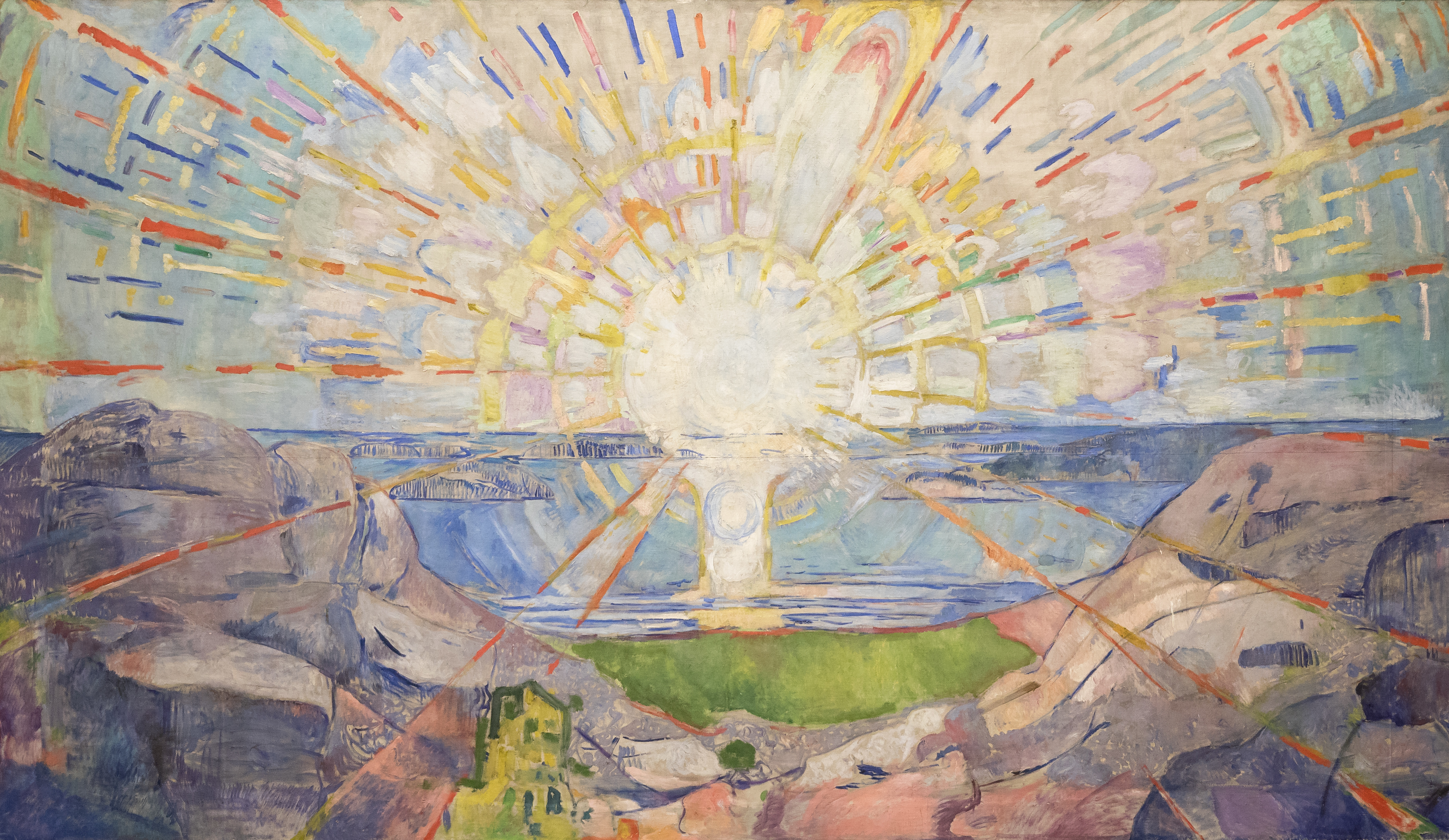
Solen (The Sun; 1911) may be seen to represent Munch's newfound optimism. The painting was featured on the reverse of Norway's 1000 Kroner notes from 2001 to 2019.

As part of his recovery, Jacobson advised Munch to only socialize with good friends and avoid drinking in public. Munch followed this advice and in the process produced several full-length portraits of high quality of friends and patrons—honest portrayals devoid of flattery. He also created landscapes and scenes of people at work and play, using a new optimistic style—broad, loose brushstrokes of vibrant color with frequent use of white space and rare use of black—with only occasional references to his morbid themes. With more income Munch was able to buy several properties giving him new vistas for his art and he was finally able to provide for his family.

The outbreak of World War I found Munch with divided loyalties, as he stated "All my friends are German but it is France I love." Given his poor health history, during 1918 Munch felt himself lucky to have survived a bout of the Spanish flu, the worldwide pandemic of that year. In the 1930s, his German patrons, many Jewish, lost their fortunes and some their lives during the rise of the Nazi movement. Munch found Norwegian printers to substitute for the Germans who had been printing his graphic work.

=== Later years ===
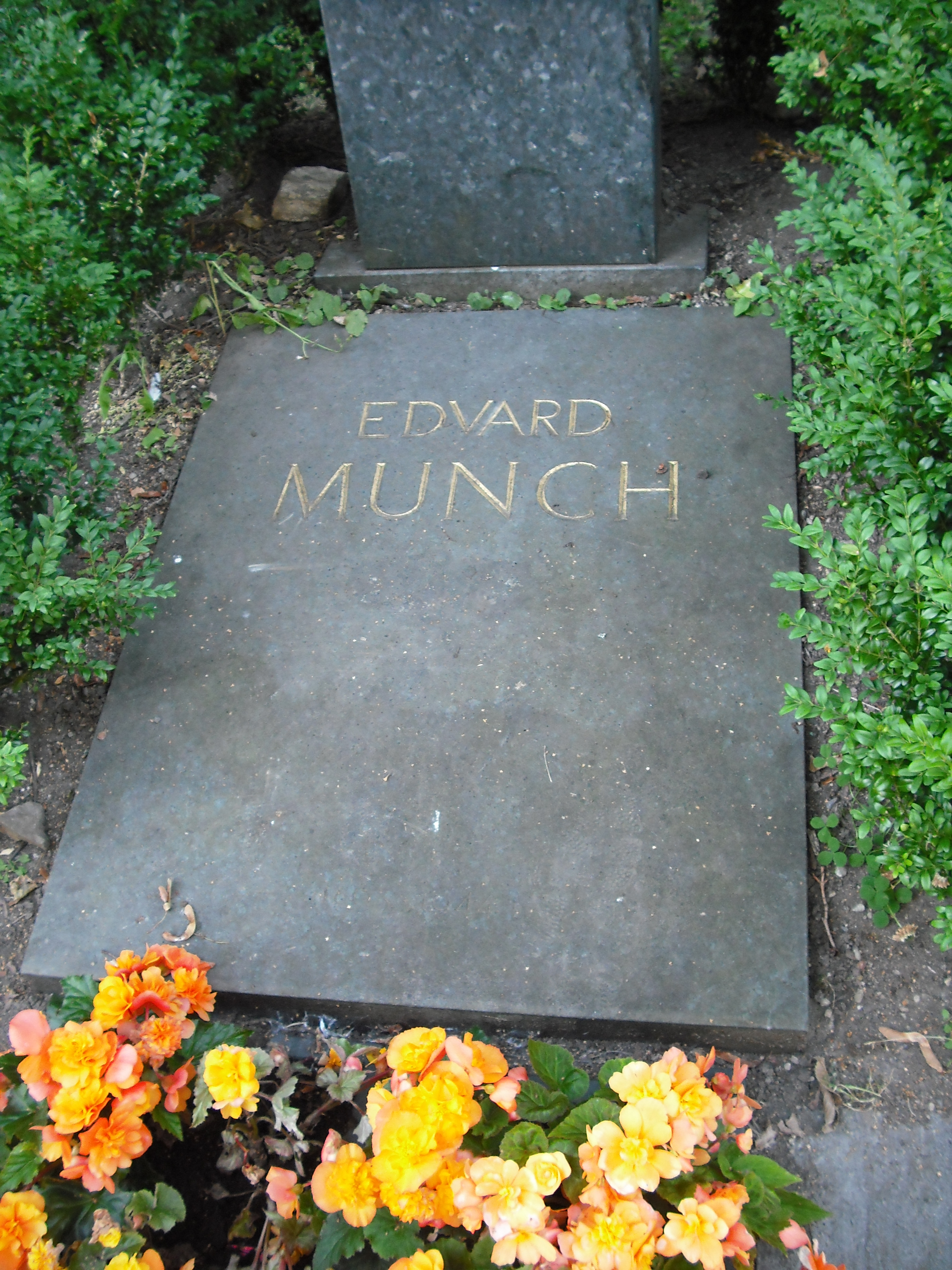
Munch's grave at the Cemetery of Our Saviour in Oslo

Munch spent most of his last two decades in solitude at his nearly self-sufficient estate in Ekely, at Skøyen, Oslo. Many of his late paintings celebrate farm life, including several in which he used his work horse "Rousseau" as a model. Without any effort, Munch attracted a steady stream of female models, whom he painted as the subjects of numerous nude paintings. He likely had sexual relationships with some of them. Munch occasionally left his home to paint murals on commission, including those done for the Freia chocolate factory.

To the end of his life, Munch continued to paint unsparing self-portraits, adding to his self-searching cycle of his life and his unflinching series of takes on his emotional and physical states. In the 1930s and 1940s, the Nazis labeled Munch's work "degenerate art" (along with that of Picasso, Klee, Matisse, Gauguin and many other modern artists) and removed his 82 works from German museums. Adolf Hitler announced in 1937, "For all we care, those pre-historic Stone Age culture barbarians and art-stutterers can return to the caves of their ancestors and there can apply their primitive international scratching."

In 1940, the Germans invaded Norway and the Nazi party took over the government. Munch was 76 years old. With nearly an entire collection of his art in the second floor of his house, Munch lived in fear of a Nazi confiscation. Seventy-one of the paintings previously taken by the Nazis had been returned to Norway through purchase by collectors (the other 11 were never recovered), including The Scream and The Sick Child, and they too were hidden from the Nazis. However, despite his work being removed from Norwegian museums during the Nazi occupation of Norway, Munch's art work was not entirely portrayed negatively in Nazi propaganda, with regular attempts even made by some in the German and Norwegian press sympathetic to Nazism to in fact rehabilitate his work and portray his life as being exemplary of Nordic traits. Despite this major recruiting effort, Munch refused to participate in these or other efforts to recruit him in the cause of the Third Reich and its allies.

=== Death ===
On the afternoon of 19 December 1943, a fire in an ammunition store at Filipstad triggered a series of explosions in Oslo, killing around 115 people and severely damaging 400 buildings. Munch, whose house was partially damaged by the explosions, witnessed how the resulting conflagration unusually illuminated the night sky which he captured in his painting Explosion. In observing and painting the scene on a cold, wet night, the 80-year-old artist succumbed to a respiratory illness, which led to his death on 23 January 1944 in his house at Ekely.

Shortly after Munch's death several men, including Fritz Jenssen, the NS-mayor of Oslo, arrived at his Ekely house to offer his family a state funeral. His family refused this offer, but to no avail – the Nazis insisted. Despite Munch's wish for a private cremation with nobody present, his funeral was hijacked by the Nazis and turned into a propaganda opportunity.

During Munch's life Nazis struggled to appropriate him as a heroic figure within the Germanic cultural sphere, but in death he became easy prey for Josef Terboven and the NS. Two days after Munch's death the NS-newspaper Fritt Folk printed an obituary poem by Knut Hamsun on the front page, and dedicated almost the entirety of page two to Munch. They made use of Munch to spread Nazi ideology, and among other things, proclaimed that "Edvard Munch was a shooting star of the Norse race, a representative of our peoples best qualities." Three days after Munch's death, Vidkun Quisling boasted in the newspapers that the state would pay for Munch's funeral.

Munch's funeral took place on 31 January 1944 in Oslo. His casket was surrounded in a well of flowers and wreaths, with two enormous wreaths decorated with swastikas placed prominently on either side of his casket. These wreathes were personally signed by Terboven, Quisling, and the NS leader for Public Information and Propaganda Georg Wilhelm Müller. Between the coverage of Edvard Munch's death in newspapers and his Nazi-orchestrated state funeral, the Nazis were successful in creating the impression that Munch supported Nazi ideologies and methods. This led many Norwegians to question whether or not Munch harboured Nazi sympathies.

The city of Oslo bought Edvard Munch's Ekely estate from his heirs in 1946; the house was demolished in May 1960.

== Legacy ==
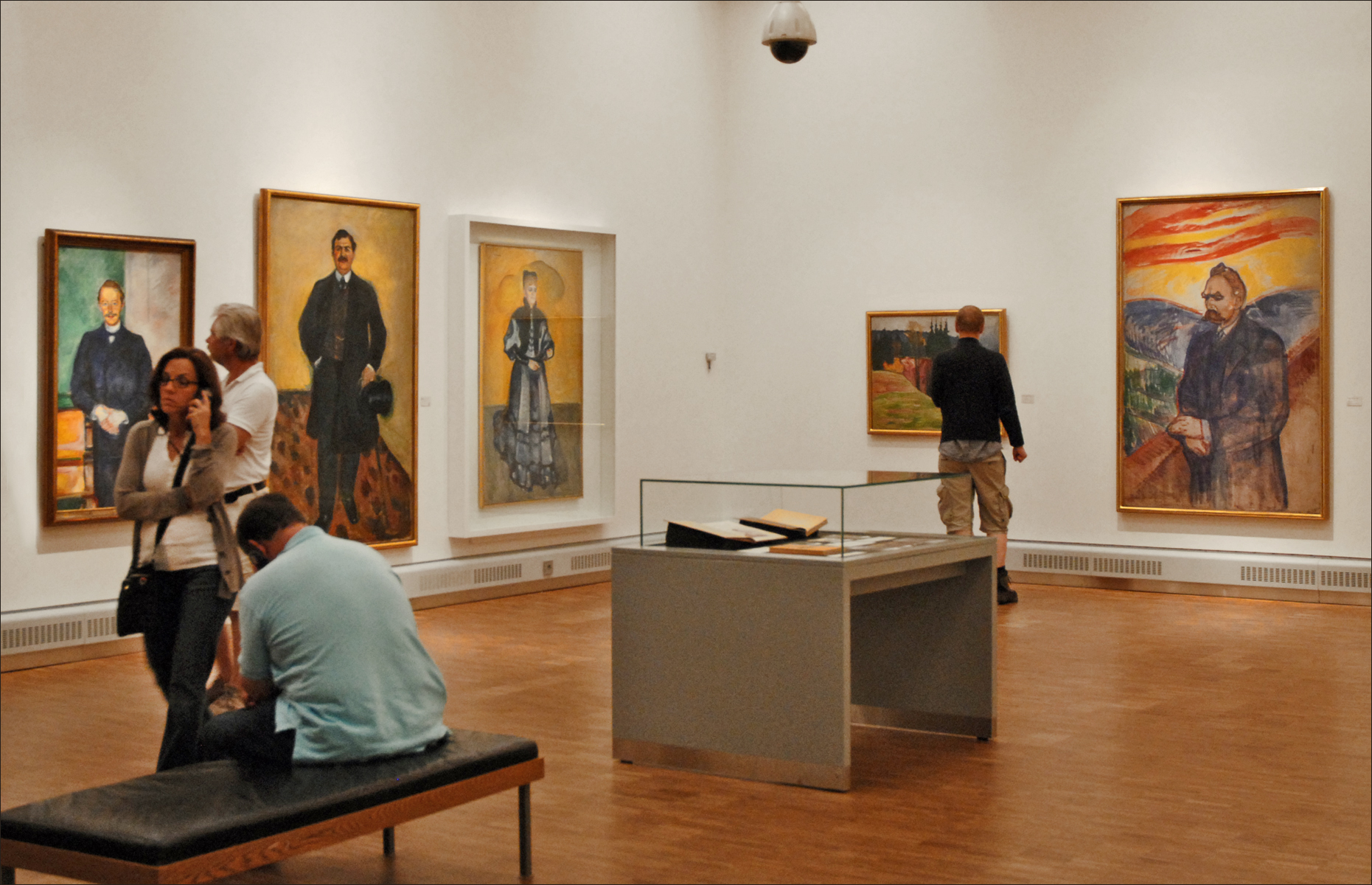
Munch Museum, Oslo

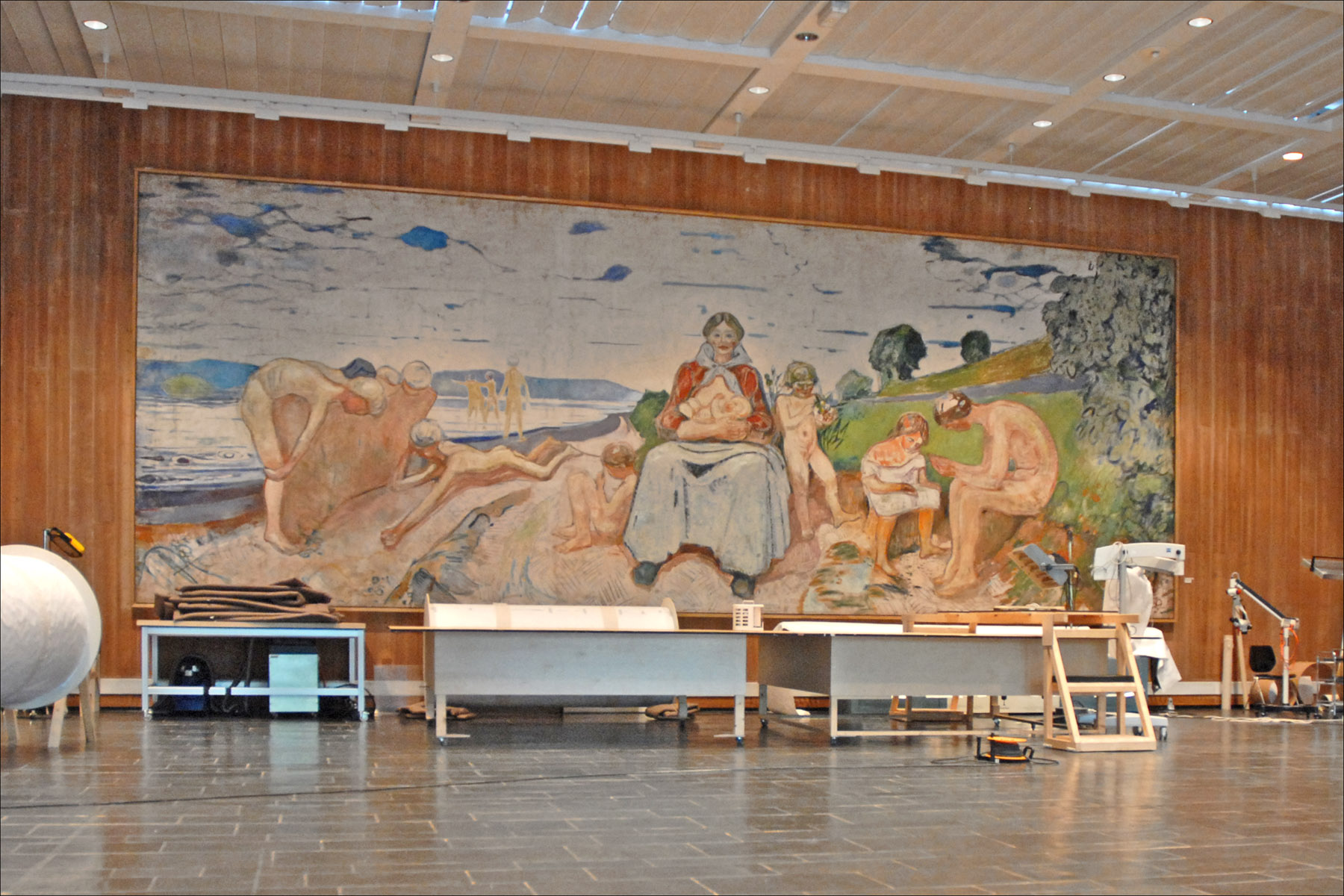
Munch Museum, Oslo

From my rotting body,
flowers shall grow
and I am in them
and that is eternity.

— Edvard Munch

When Munch died, his remaining works were bequeathed to the city of Oslo, which built the Munch Museum at Tøyen (it opened in 1963). The museum holds a collection of approximately 1,100 paintings, 4,500 drawings, and 18,000 prints, the broadest collection of his works in the world. The Munch Museum serves as Munch's official estate; it has been active in responding to copyright infringements as well as clearing copyright for the work, such as the appearance of Munch's The Scream in a 2006 M&M's advertising campaign. The U.S. copyright representative for the Munch Museum and the Estate of Edvard Munch is the Artists Rights Society.

Munch's art was highly personalized and he did little teaching. His "private" symbolism was far more personal than that of other Symbolist painters such as Gustave Moreau and James Ensor. Munch was still highly influential, particularly with the German Expressionists, who followed his philosophy, "I do not believe in the art which is not the compulsive result of Man's urge to open his heart." Many of his paintings, including The Scream, have universal appeal in addition to their highly personal meaning.

Munch's works are now represented in numerous major museums and galleries in Norway and abroad. His cabin, "the Happy House", was given to the municipality of Åsgårdstrand in 1944; it serves as a small Munch Museum. The inventory has been maintained exactly as he left it.

One version of The Scream was stolen from the National Gallery in 1994. In 2004, another version of The Scream, along with one of Madonna, was stolen from the Munch Museum in a daring daylight robbery. These were all eventually recovered, but the paintings stolen in the 2004 robbery were extensively damaged. They have been meticulously restored and are on display again. Three Munch works were stolen from the Hotel Refsnes Gods in 2005; they were shortly recovered, although one of the works was damaged during the robbery.

In October 2006, the color woodcut of Munch's mofif, Two Human Beings. The Lonely Ones (To mennesker. De ensomme), set a new record for his prints when it was sold at an auction in Oslo for 8.1 million kroner (US$1.27 million equivalent to $2,000,000 in 2025). It also set a record for the highest price paid in auction in Norway. On 3 November 2008, the painting Vampire set a new record for his paintings when it was sold for US$38,162,000 (equivalent to $57,100,000 in 2025) at Sotheby's New York.

Munch's image appeared on the obverse side of the Norwegian 1,000-kroner note (Series VII; valid from 2001 to 2020). The reverse side features a stylized version of Munch's Solen (the Sun).

From 31 July – 28 November 2010, the National Gallery of Art exhibited Munch's prints in Edvard Munch: Master Prints. The catalog was edited by Elizabeth Prelinger ISBN 978-3791350592

In February 2012, a major Munch exhibition, Edvard Munch. The Modern Eye, opened at the Schirn Kunsthalle Frankfurt; the exhibition was opened by Mette-Marit, Crown Princess of Norway.

In May 2012, The Scream sold for US$119.9 million (equivalent to $168,100,000 in 2025), and is the second most expensive artwork ever sold at an open auction. (It was surpassed in November 2013 by Three Studies of Lucian Freud, which sold for US$142.4 million).

In 2013, four of Munch's paintings were depicted in a series of stamps by the Norwegian postal service, to commemorate in 2014 the 150th anniversary of his birth.

From 19 May – 11 August 2013, the National Gallery of Art exhibited Edvard Munch: A 150th Anniversary Tribute.

In 2016 the Neue Galerie, New York City, hosted the exhibition, Munch and Expressionism, which "…examined Edvard Munch's influence on his German and Austrian contemporaries."

On 14 November 2016 a version of Munch's The Girls on the Bridge sold for US$54.5 million (equivalent to $73,100,000 in 2025) at Sotheby's, New York, making it the second highest price achieved for one of his paintings.

In 2017, Edvard Munch: Between the Clock and the Bed, was an exhibition of Munch's work created over his career, including 16 self-portraits. It was organized by San Francisco Museum of Modern Art (exhibited 24 June – 9 October 2017), The Met Breuer, New York (exhibited 15 November 2017 – 4 February 2018), and the Munch Museum, Oslo (exhibit 12 May – 9 September 2018). The catalog of the same name was edited by Gary Garrels, Jon-Ove Steihaug and Sheena Wagstaff. ISBN 978-1-588-39623-5

From 3 September 2017 - 28 January 2018, the National Gallery of Art exhibited Munch's prints in Edvard Munch: Color in Context.

In April 2019 the British Museum hosted the exhibition, Edvard Munch: Love and Angst, comprising 83 artworks and including a rare original print of The Scream.

In May 2022 the Courtauld Gallery hosted the exhibition, Edvard Munch. Masterpieces from Bergen, showcasing 18 paintings from Norwegian industrialist Rasmus Meyer's collection.

In June 2023 the Clark Art Institute hosted the exhibition Edvard Munch: Trembling Earth. It was the first exhibit in the United States to focus on how Munch used nature to convey deeper meaning in his painting. Trembling Earth featured more than 75 works, many from the Munch Museum's collection, and over 40 paintings and prints from rarely seen private collections.

In September 2023, the Berlinische Galerie Museum for Modern Art hosted an exhibition Edvard Munch. Magic of the North in collaboration with the Munch Museum. The exhibition included around 80 works by Edvard Munch, supplemented by works by other artists who shaped the idea of the north and the modern art scene on the Spree in Berlin at the end of the 19th century.

In November 2023, the Museum Barberini in Potsdam also hosted an exhibition Edvard Munch: Trembling Earth in collaboration with the Munch Museum. The exhibition overlapped the Berlinische Galerie exhibition by eight weeks; both exhibitions were under the joint patronage of German President Frank-Walter Steinmeier and His Majesty King Harald V of Norway. The exhibition included more than 110 loans from other institutions.

In 2024, the Yale University Art Gallery hosted Munch and Kirchner: Anxiety and Expression which examined the prints of both artists and "…how these artists suffered from—and attempted to cope with—the anxieties of their age." The exhibit was accompanied by Freyda Spira, with contributions from Allison Morehead, Catherine Woodard, and Nelson Blitz

In May 2025, Harvard Art Museum hosted Edvard Munch: Technically Speaking. The exhibition features both paintings and prints, many donated by Philip A. and Lynn G. Strauss. As a result of their gift, Harvard's collection is the largest collection of Munch's works in the United States.

=== University Aula ===
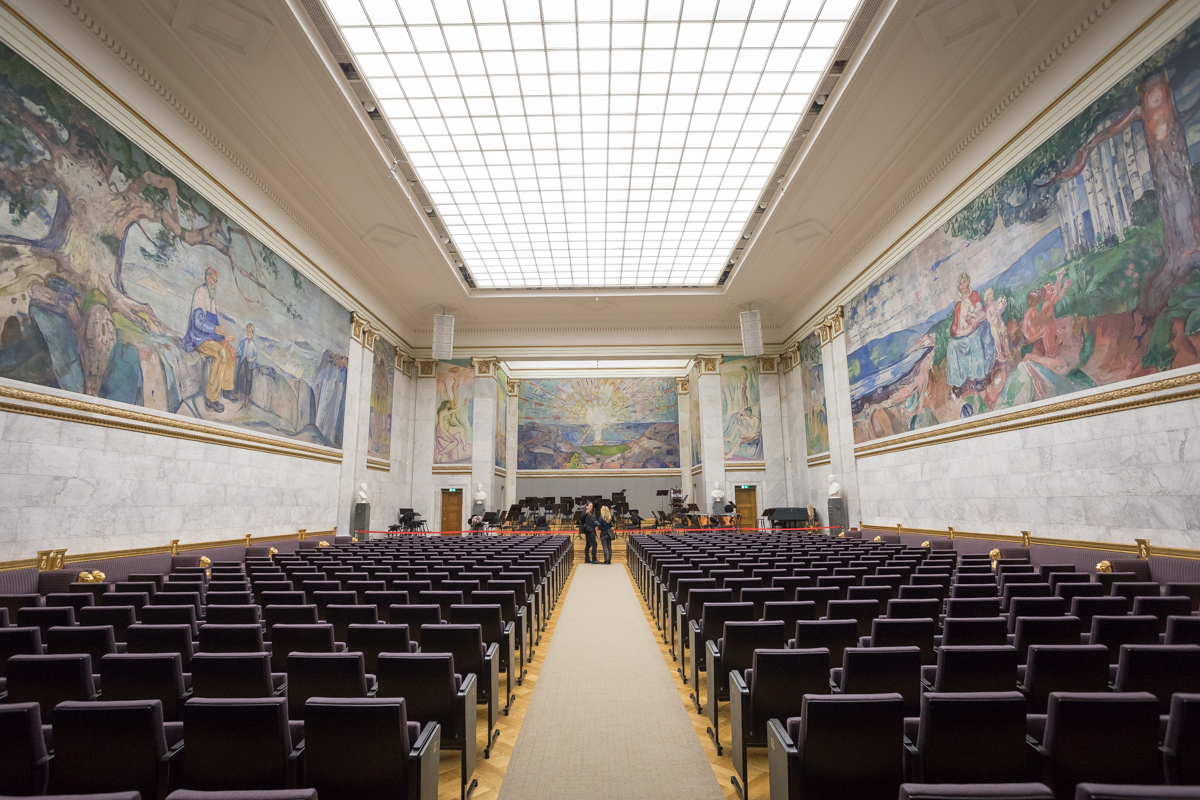
The Aula featuring History (left), The Sun (front), Alma Mater (right), smaller paintings on corners

In 1911 the final competition for the decoration of the large walls of the University of Oslo Aula (assembly hall) was held between Munch and Emanuel Vigeland. The episode is known as the "Aula controversy". In 1914 Munch was finally commissioned to decorate the Aula and the work was completed in 1916. This major work in Norwegian monumental painting includes 11 paintings covering 223 m^{2} (2,400 sq ft). The Sun, History and Alma Mater are the key works in this sequence. Munch said: "I wanted the decorations to form a complete and independent world of ideas, and I wanted their visual expression to be both distinctively Norwegian and universally human". In 2014 it was suggested that the Aula paintings have a value of at least 500 million kroner (approx US$111 million in 2025).

=== Looted art controversies ===
In 2007, Munch's Summer Night at the Beach was returned to the granddaughter of Alma Mahler, who was forced to flee the Nazis with her Jewish husband in March 1938, after Hitler's annexation of Austria. In 2008 the Basel Fine Arts Museum rejected a claim for Munch's Madonna, a lithograph of a nude in black, red and blue, from the heirs of the Jewish collector Curt Glaser. In 2012 Berlin's Kupferstichkabinett restituted three drawings by Munch to the heirs of Glaser, a Jewish collector forced into exile by the Nazis. In 2012, a claim for The Scream from the heirs of Hugo Simon was rejected as it went to auction. In 2023 Munch's Dance on the Beach was the object of an accord between the Glaser heirs and the heirs of Thomas Olsen, a Norwegian shipowner and Munch's neighbour and collector.

== Major works ==
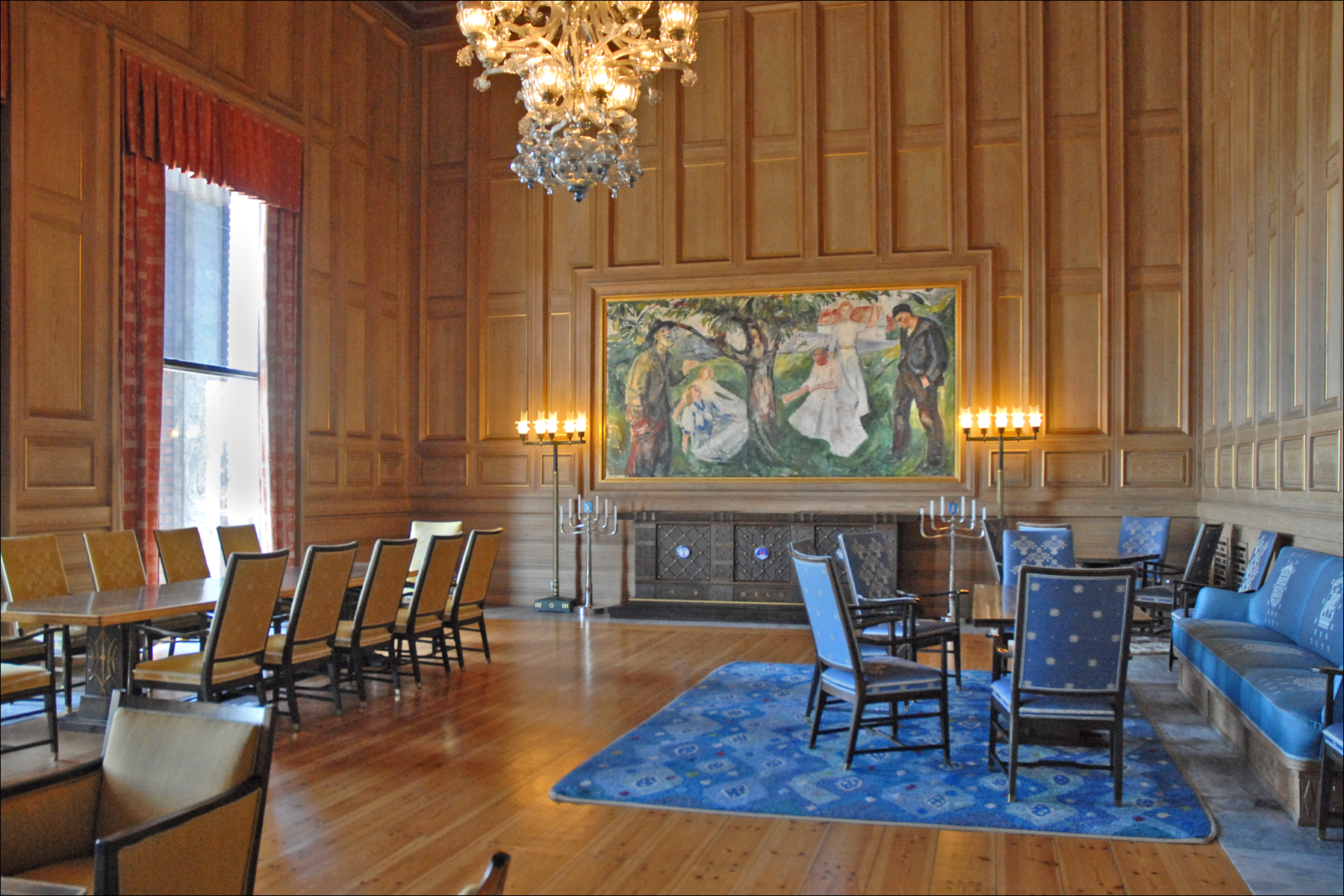
Life by Munch, at the Rådhuset (City Hall) in Oslo. The room is called The Munch room.

- 1885–1886: The Sick Child
- 1892: Evening on Karl Johan
- 1893: The Scream
- 1894: Ashes
- 1894: Despair
- 1894: Woman in Three Stages. Sphinx
- 1894–1895: Madonna
- 1894–1896: Melancholy
- 1895: Puberty
- 1895: Self-Portrait with Cigarette
- 1895: Death in the Sickroom
- 1899–1900: The Dance of Life
- 1899–1900: The Dead Mother
- 1903: Village in Moonlight
- 1940–1942: Self-Portrait. Between the Clock and the Bed.

== Selected works ==
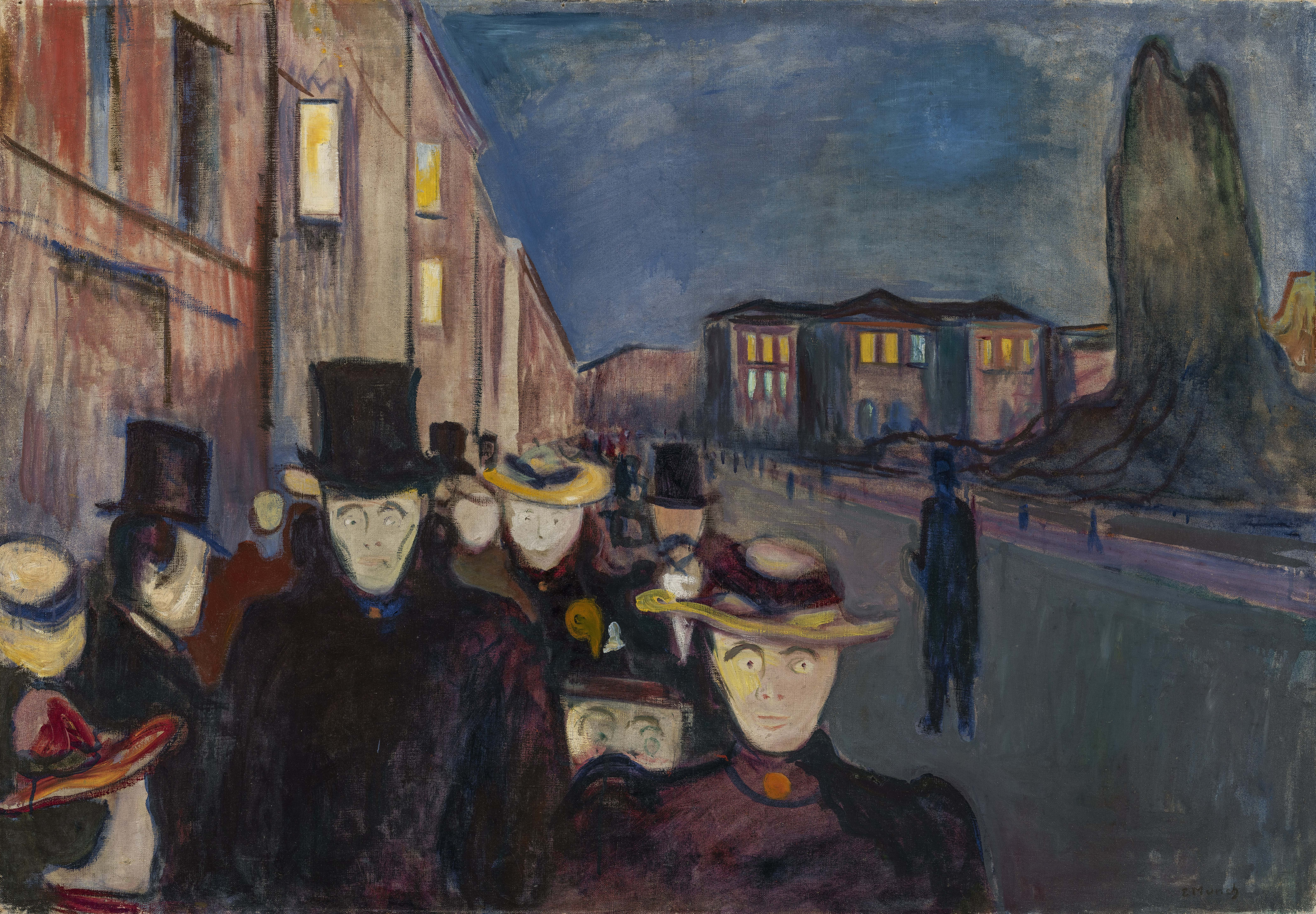
Evening on Karl Johan, 1892, oil on canvas, 84.5 cm × 121 cm (33 1/4 in × 47 3/4 in). Kode Museum, Bergen

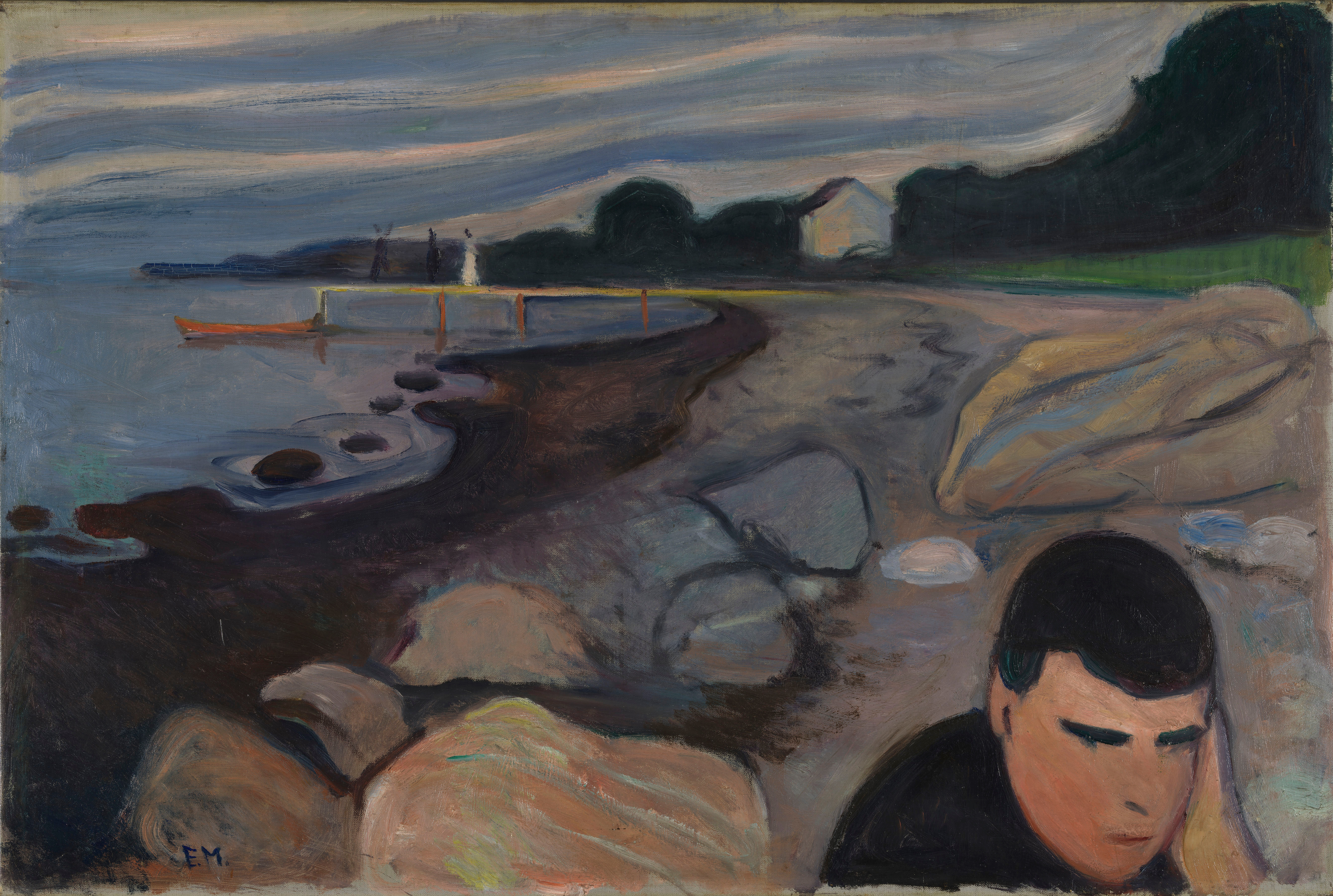
Melancholy, 1892, oil on canvas, 64 cm × 96 cm (25 1/4 in × 37 3/4 in). National Museum of Norway, Oslo

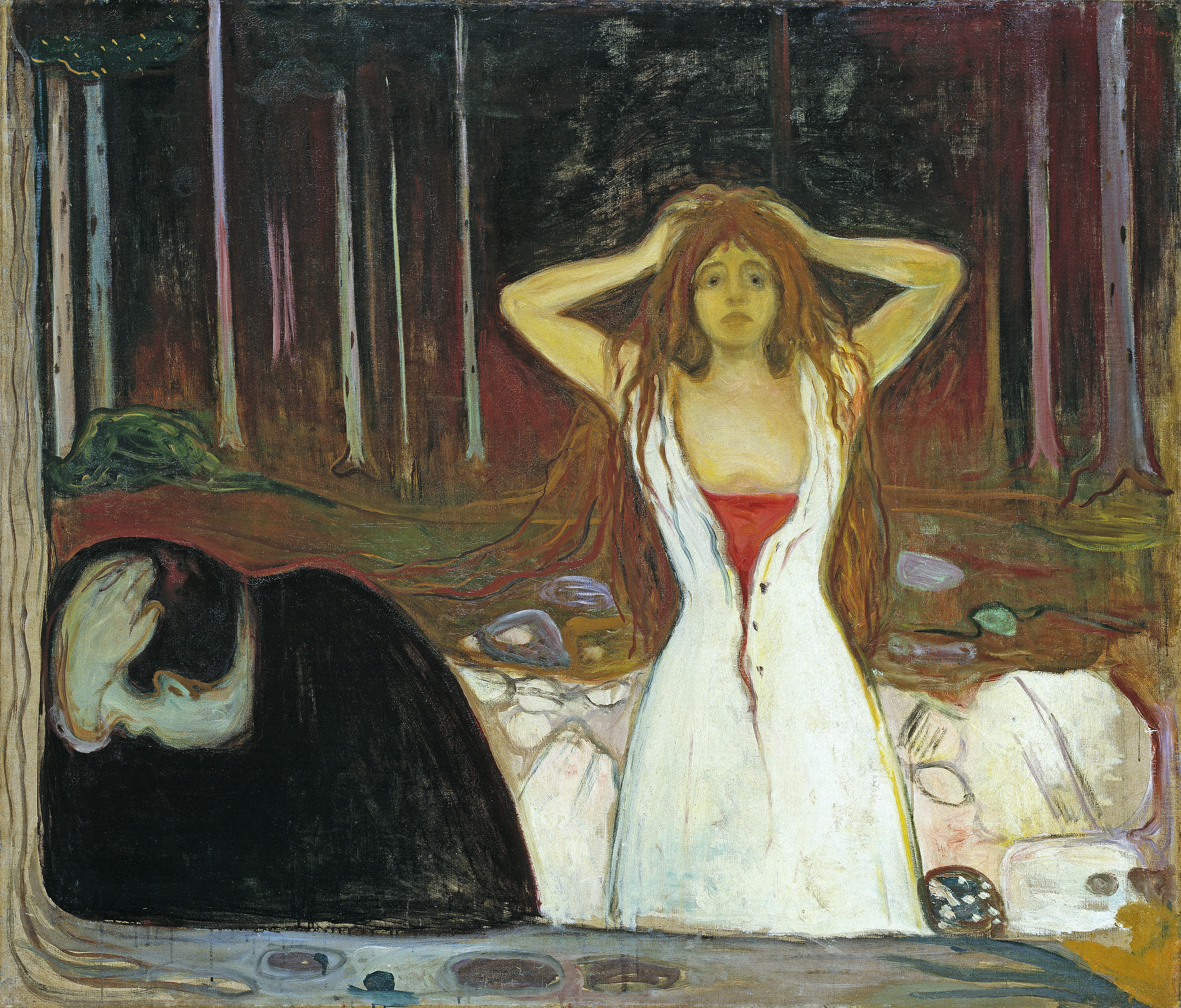
Ashes, 1894, oil on canvas, 120.5 cm × 141 cm (47 1/2 in × 55 1/2 in). National Museum of Norway, Oslo

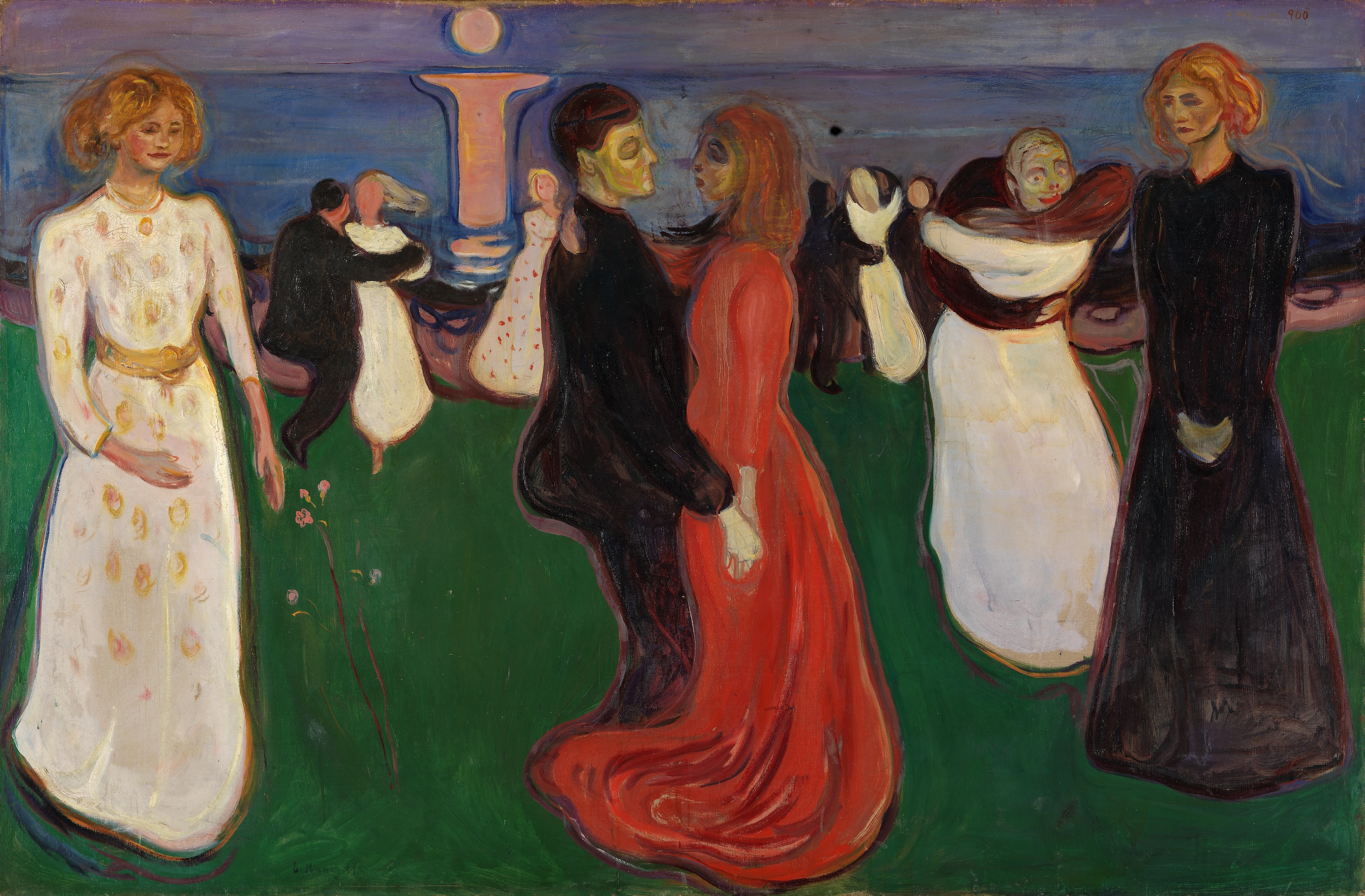
The Dance of Life, 1899–1900, oil on canvas, 126 cm × 191 cm (49 1/2 in × 75 in), National Museum of Norway, Oslo

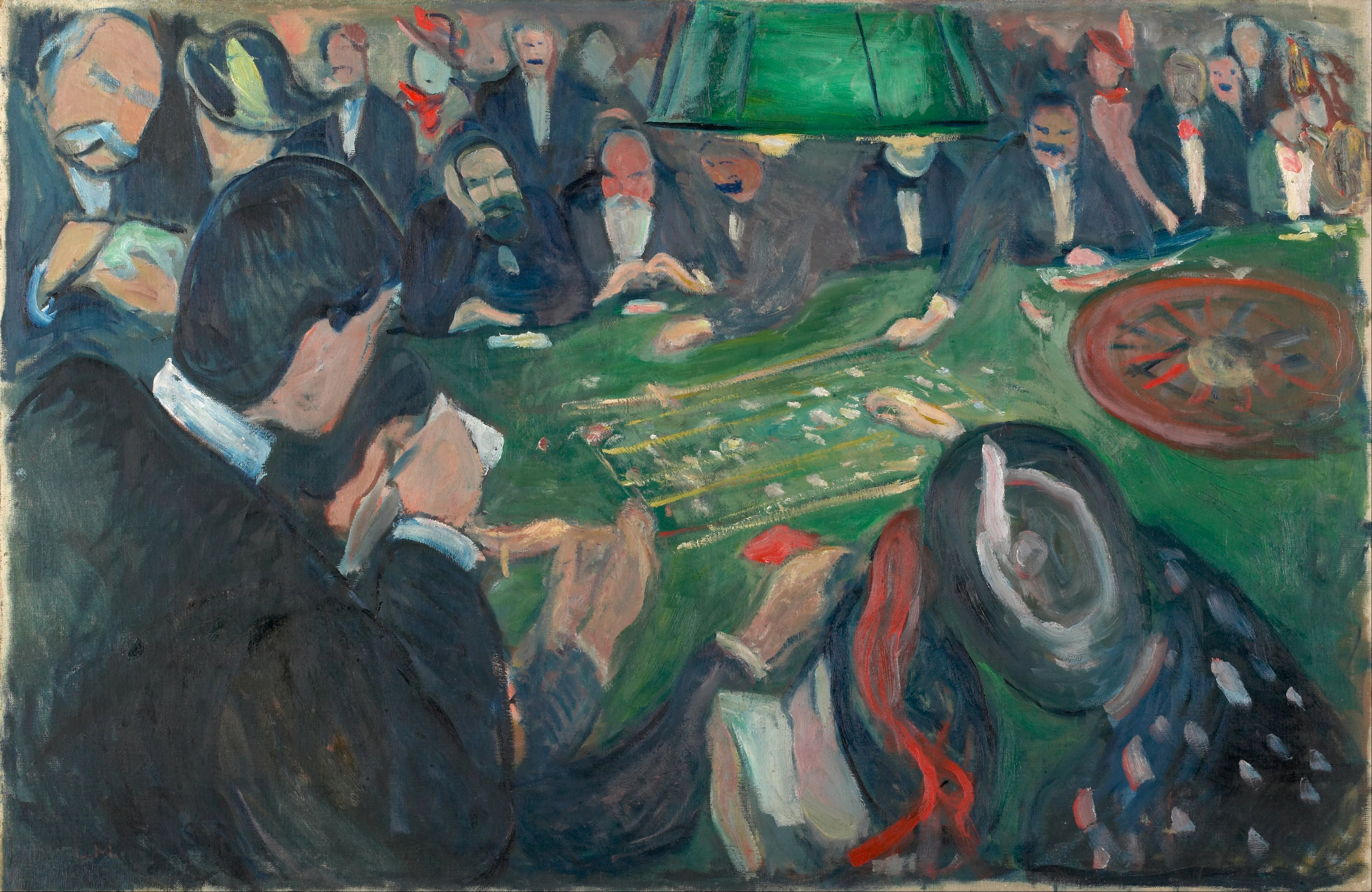
At the Roulette Table in Monte Carlo, 1892, 74.5 cm × 116 cm (29 1/4 in × 45 3/4 in), Munch Museum, Oslo

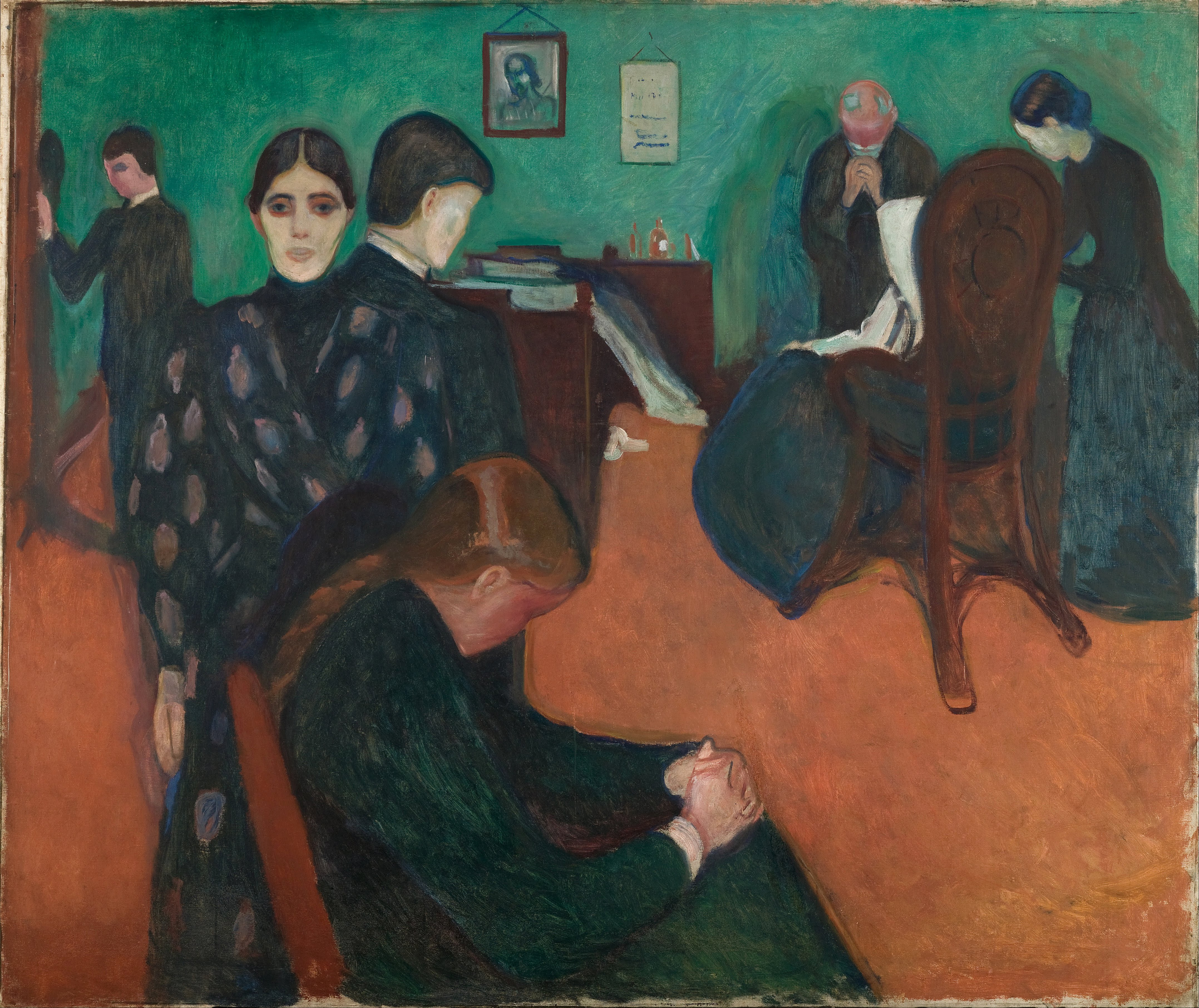
Death in the Sickroom, 1893, 134 cm × 160 cm (52 3/4 in × 63 in), Munch Museum, Oslo

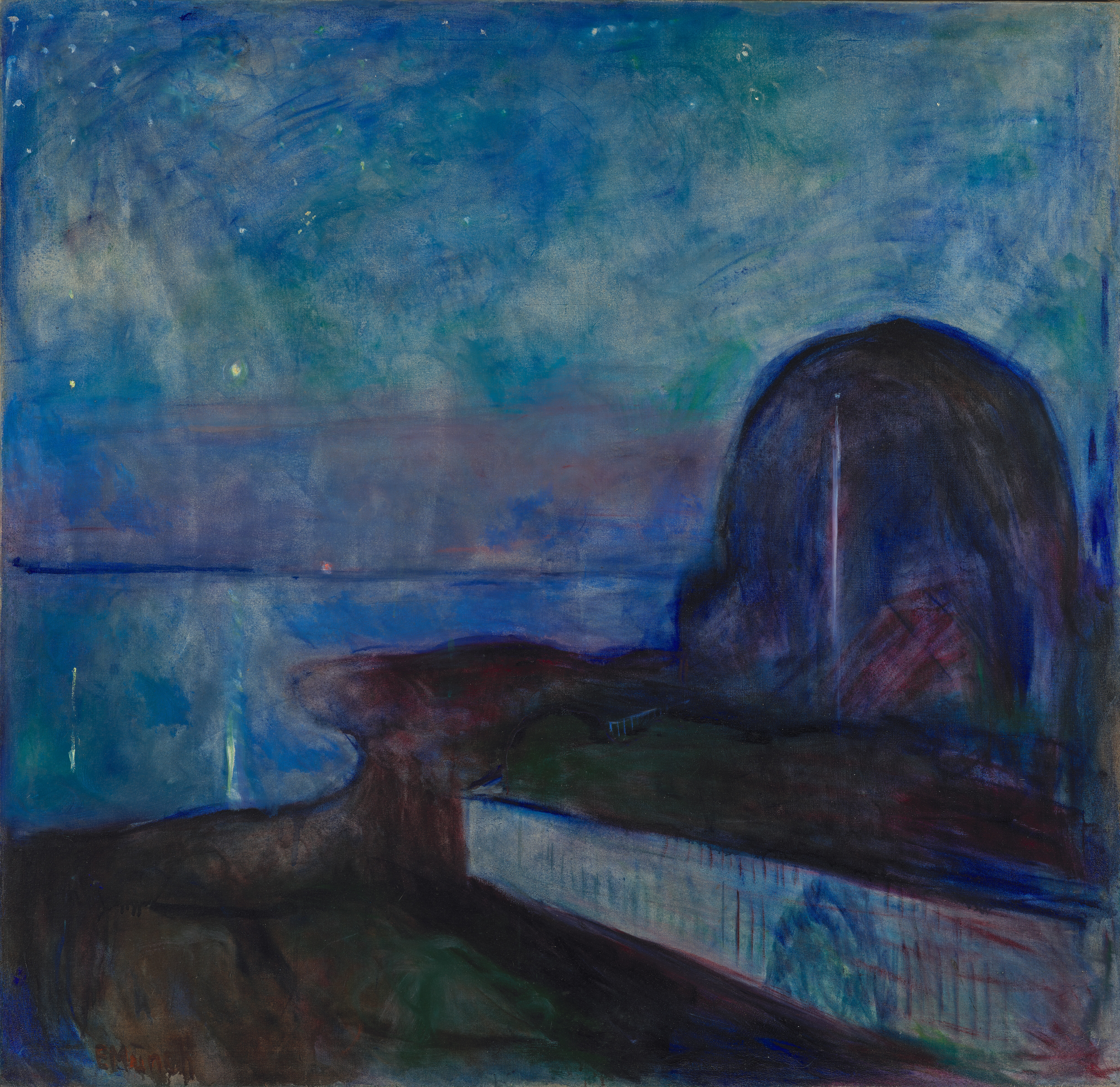
Starry Night, 1893, 135.6 cm × 140 cm (53 1/2 in × 55 in), J. Paul Getty Museum

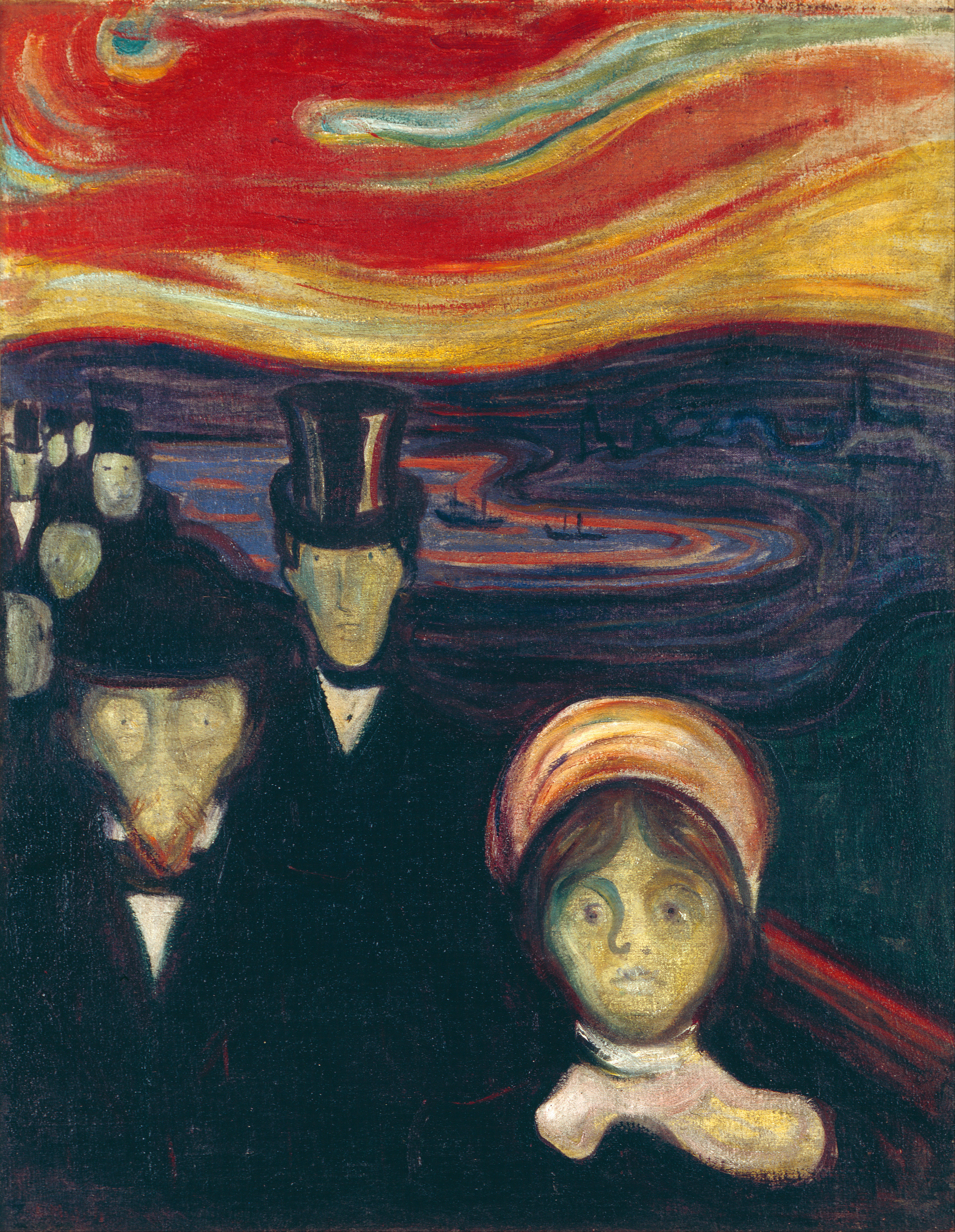
Anxiety, 1894, 94 cm × 74 cm (37 in × 29 1/4 in), Munch Museum, Oslo

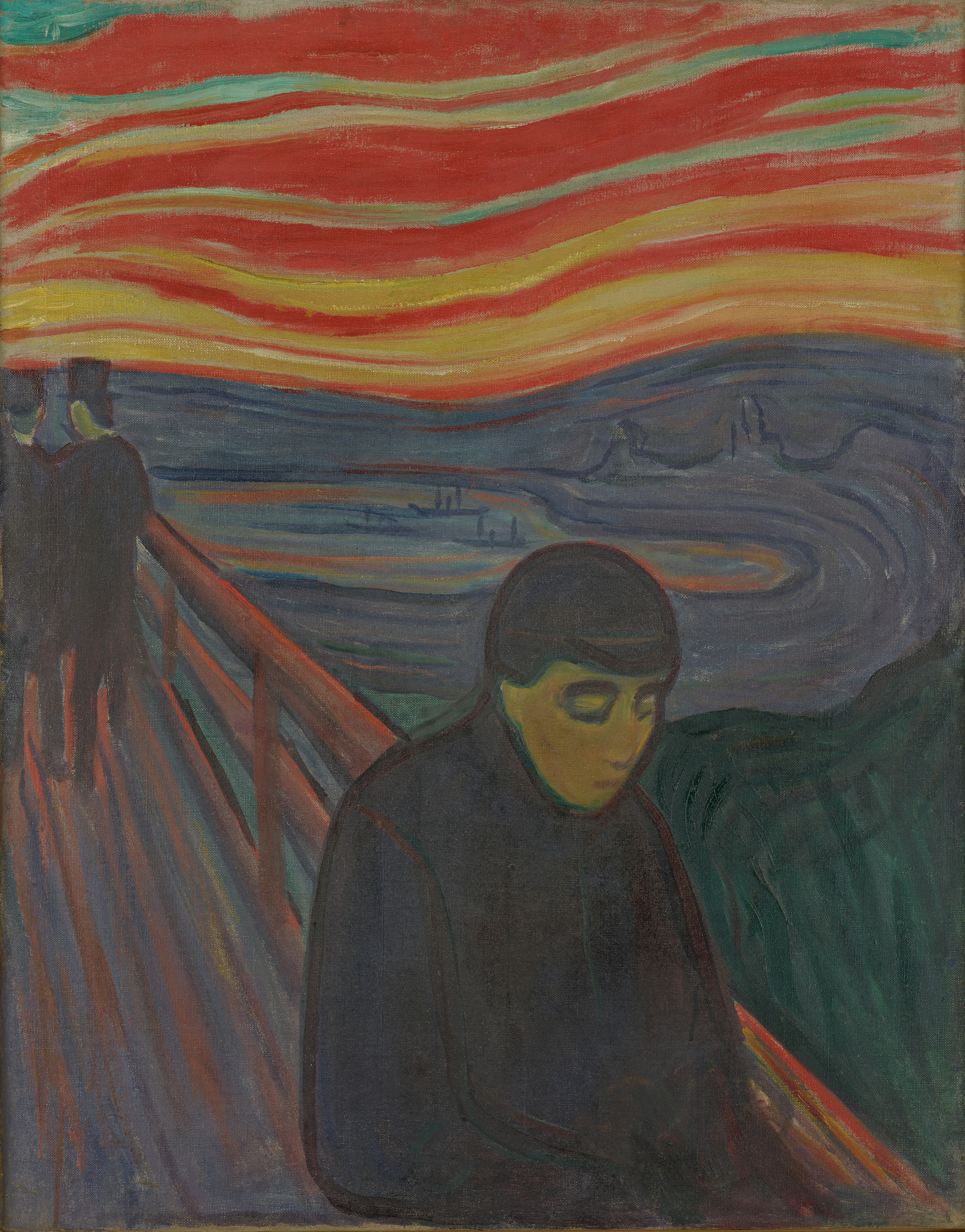
Despair, 1894, 92 cm × 72.5 cm (36 1/4 in × 28 1/2 in), Munch Museum, Oslo

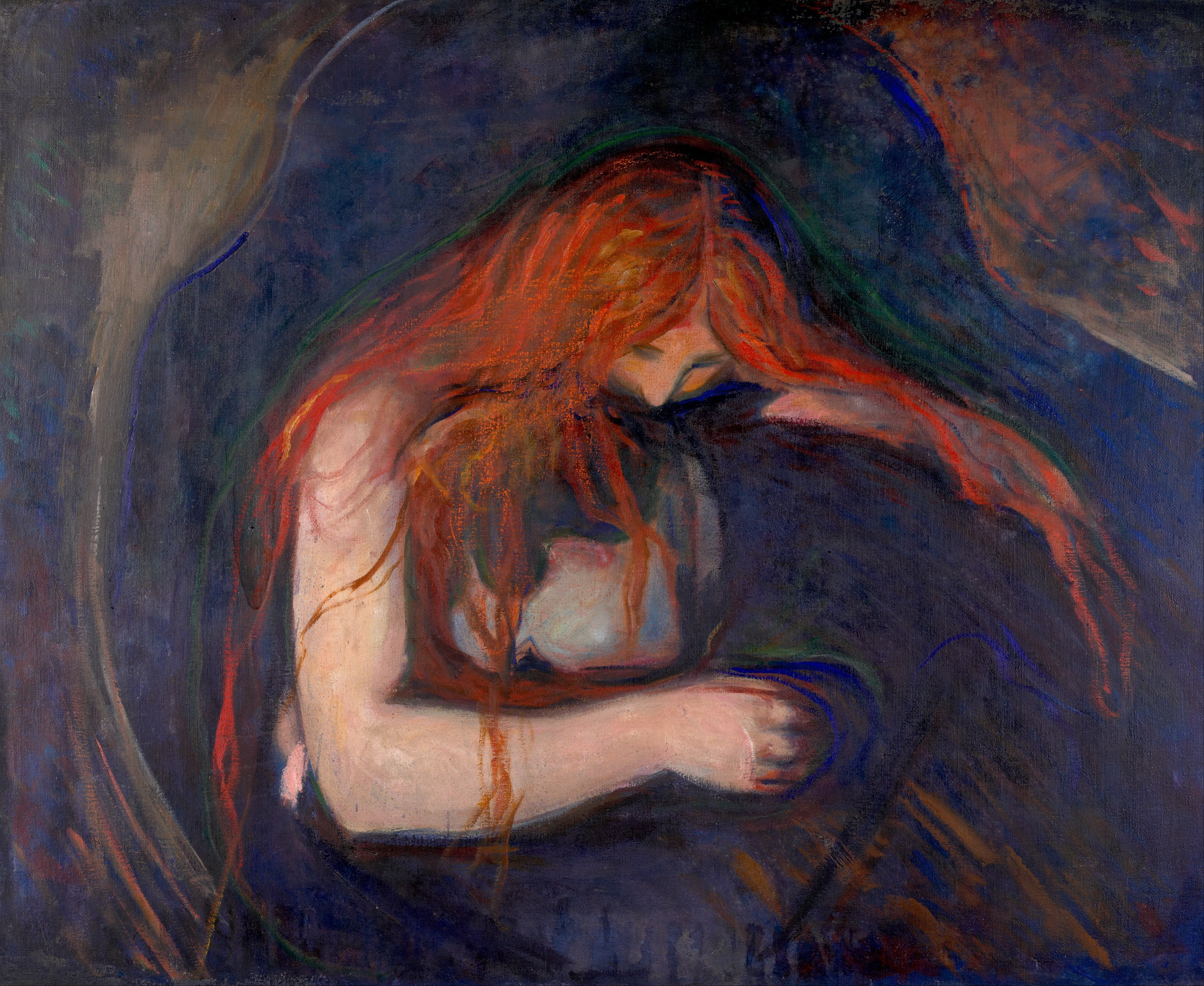
Love and Pain (Vampire), 1895, 91 cm × 109 cm (35 3/4 in × 43 in), Munch Museum, Oslo

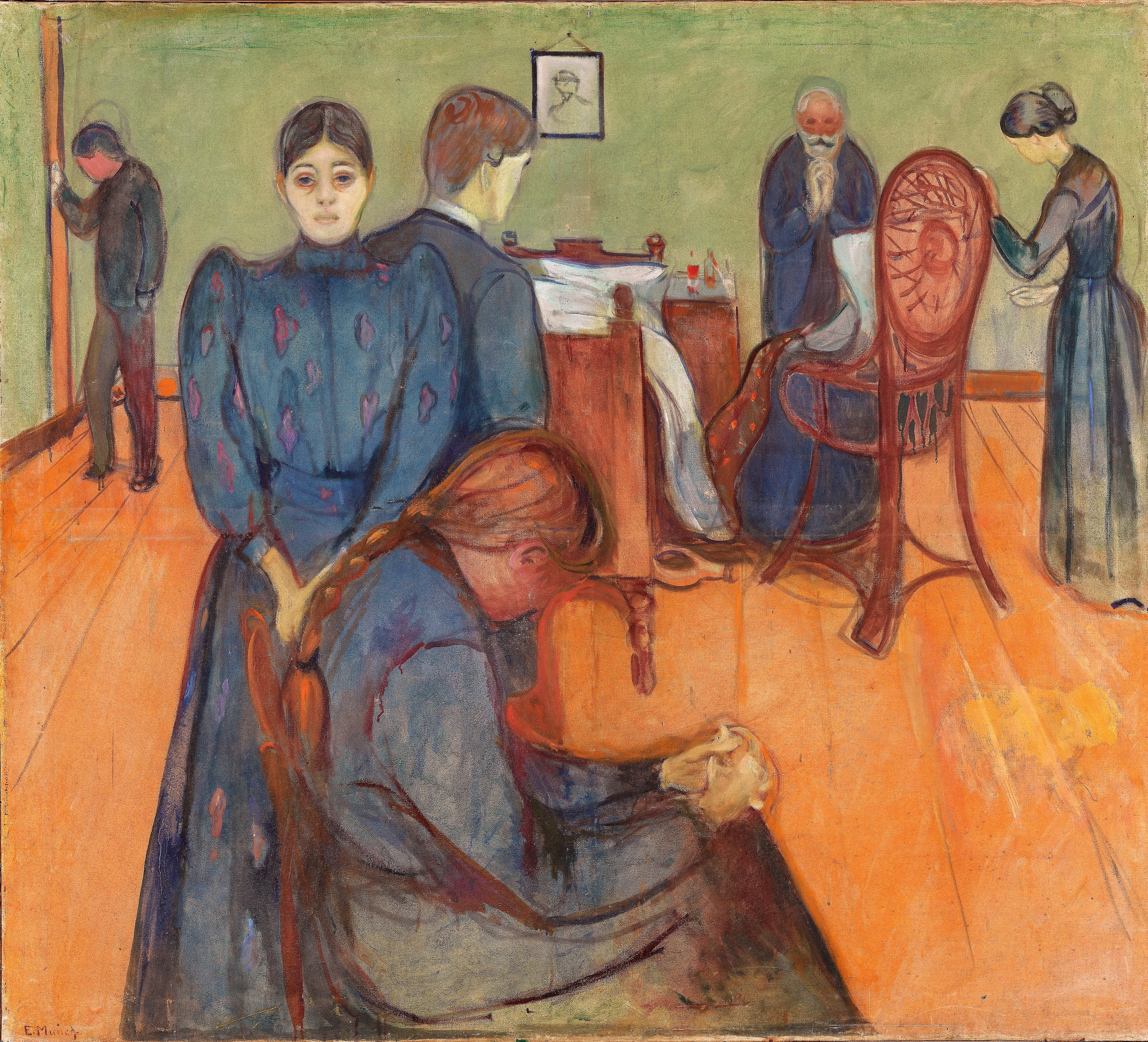
Death in the Sickroom, c. 1895, oil on canvas, 150 cm × 168 cm (59 in × 66 in), National Museum of Norway, Oslo

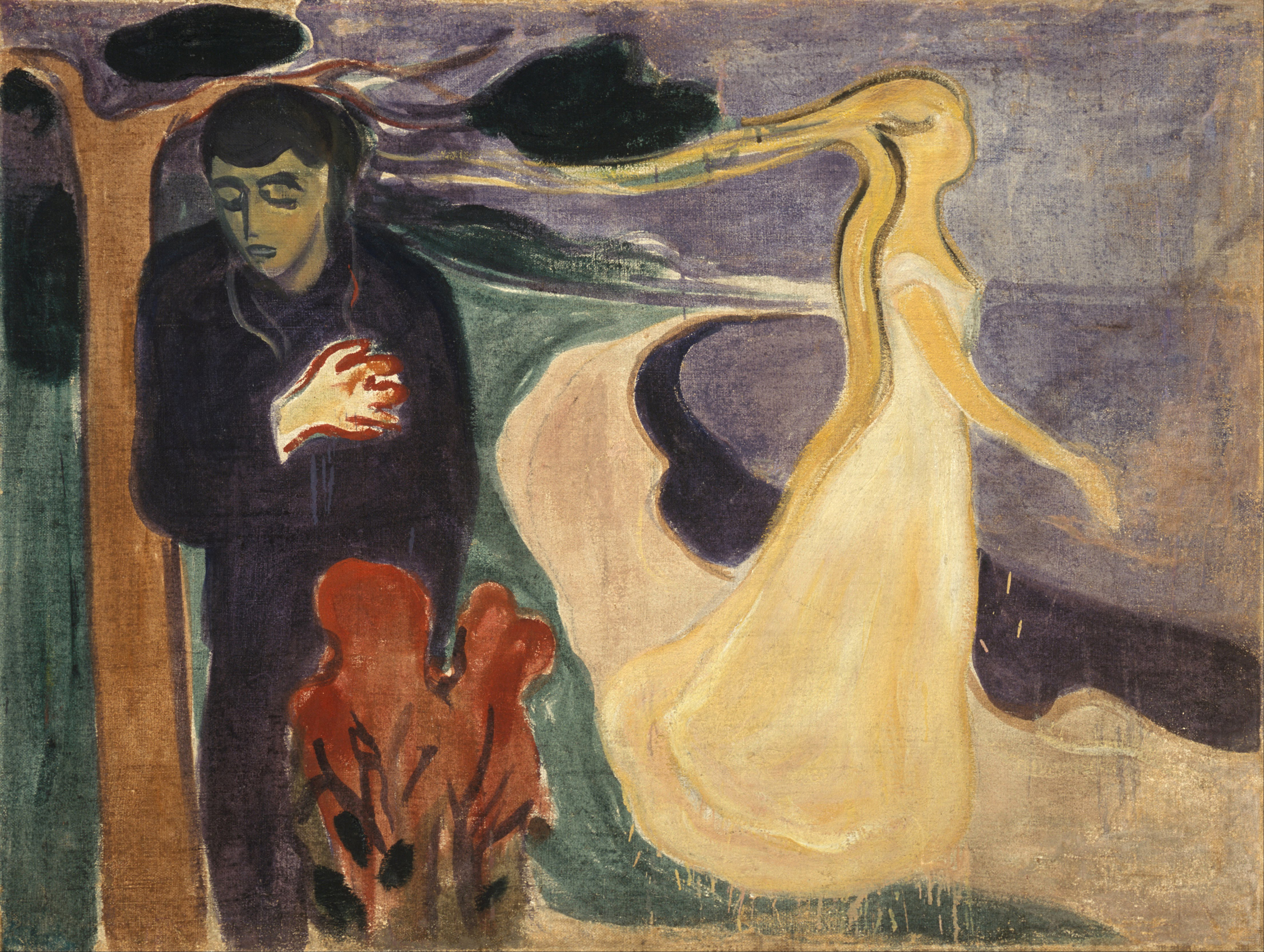
Separation, 1896, 96 cm × 127 cm (37 3/4 in × 50 in), Munch Museum, Oslo

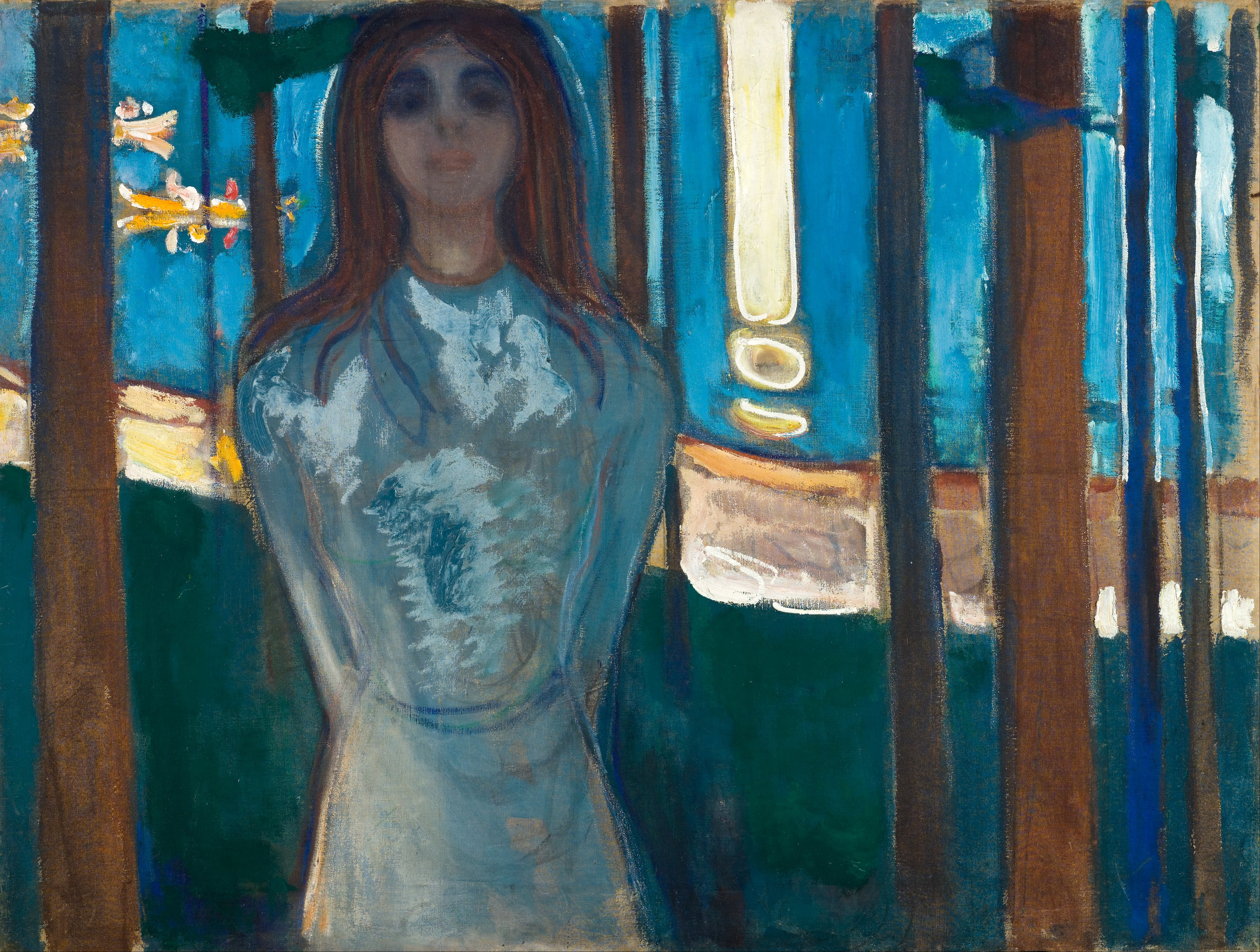
The Voice / Summer Night, 1896, 90 cm × 119 cm (35 1/2 in × 46 3/4 in), Munch Museum, Oslo

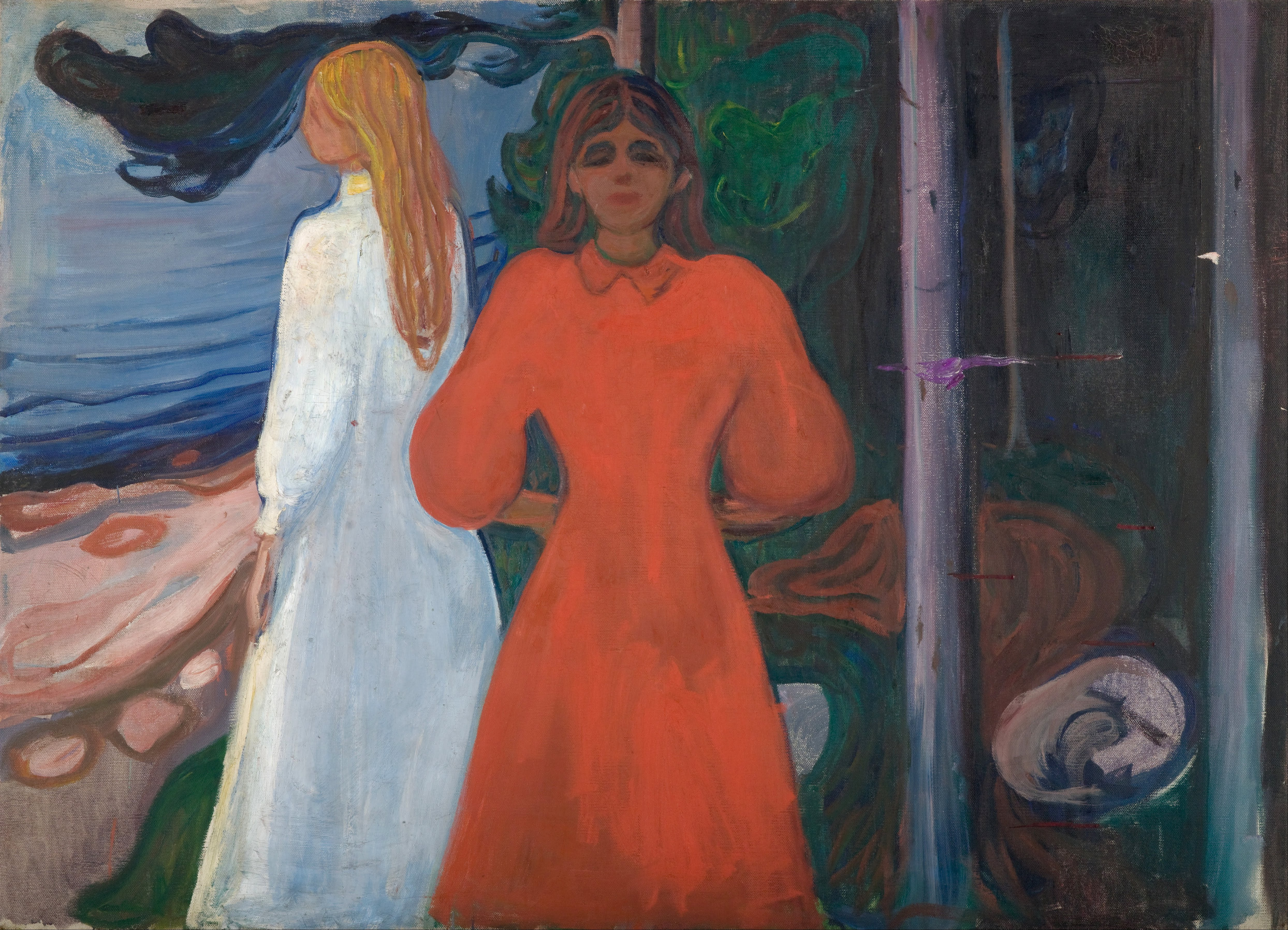
Red and White, 1899–1900, 93 cm × 129 cm (36 1/2 in × 50 3/4 in), Munch Museum, Oslo

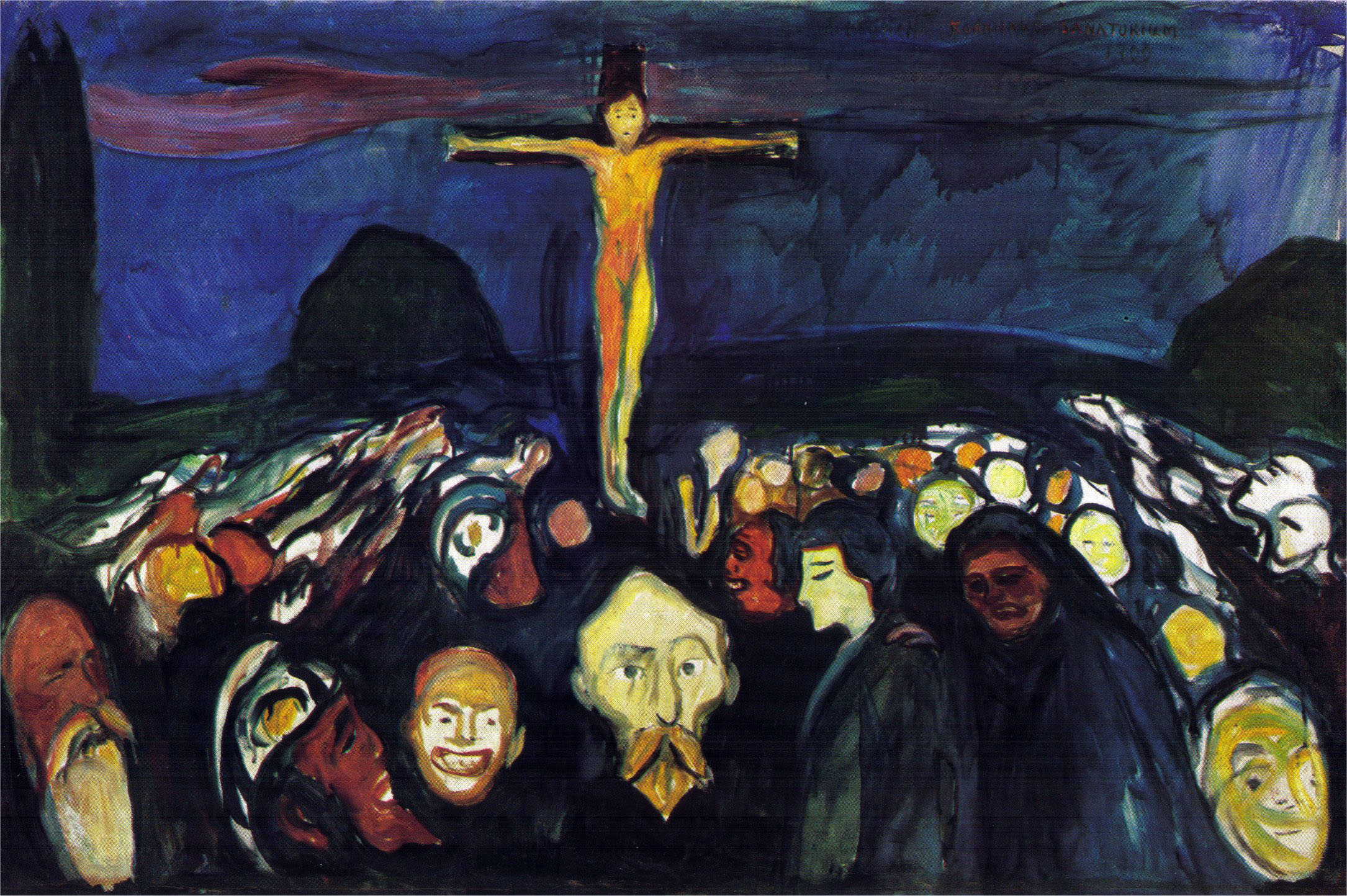
Golgotha, 1900, oil on canvas, Munch Museum, Oslo

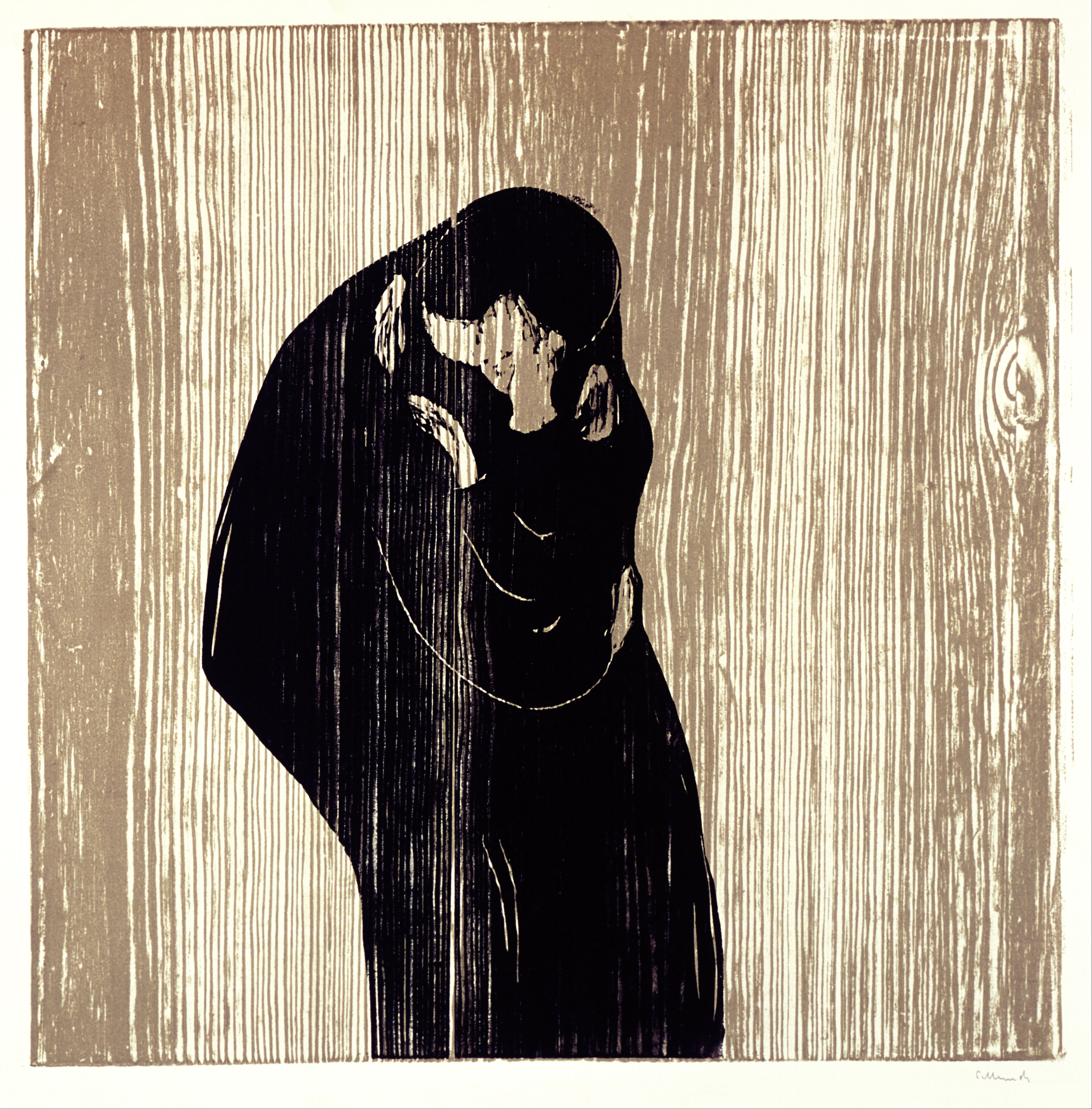
Kiss IV, 1902, woodcut print on wood, 47 cm × 47 cm (18 1/2 in × 18 1/2 in), Munch Museum, Oslo

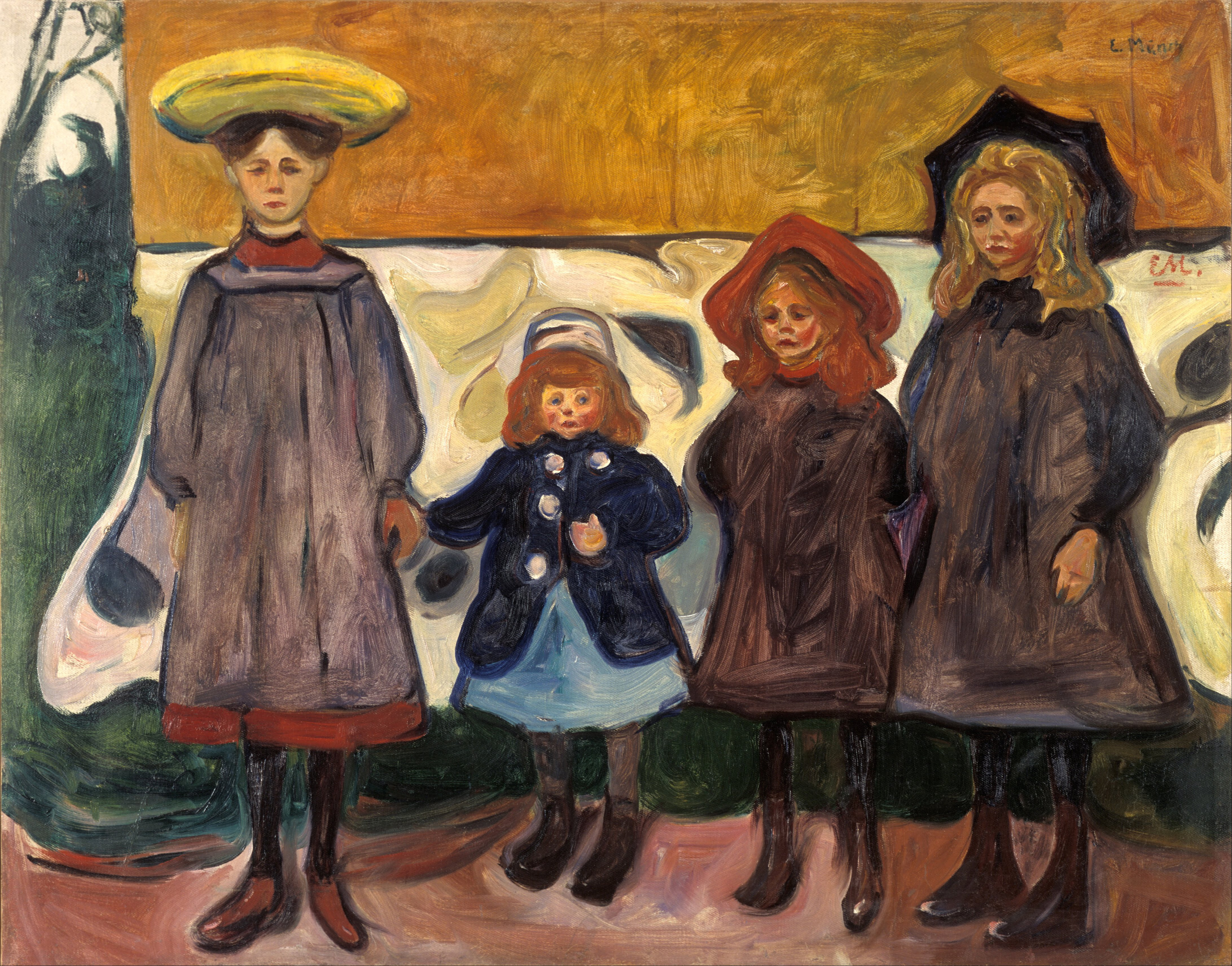
Four Girls in Åsgårdstrand, 1903, 87 cm × 111 cm (34 1/4 in × 43 3/4 in), Munch Museum, Oslo

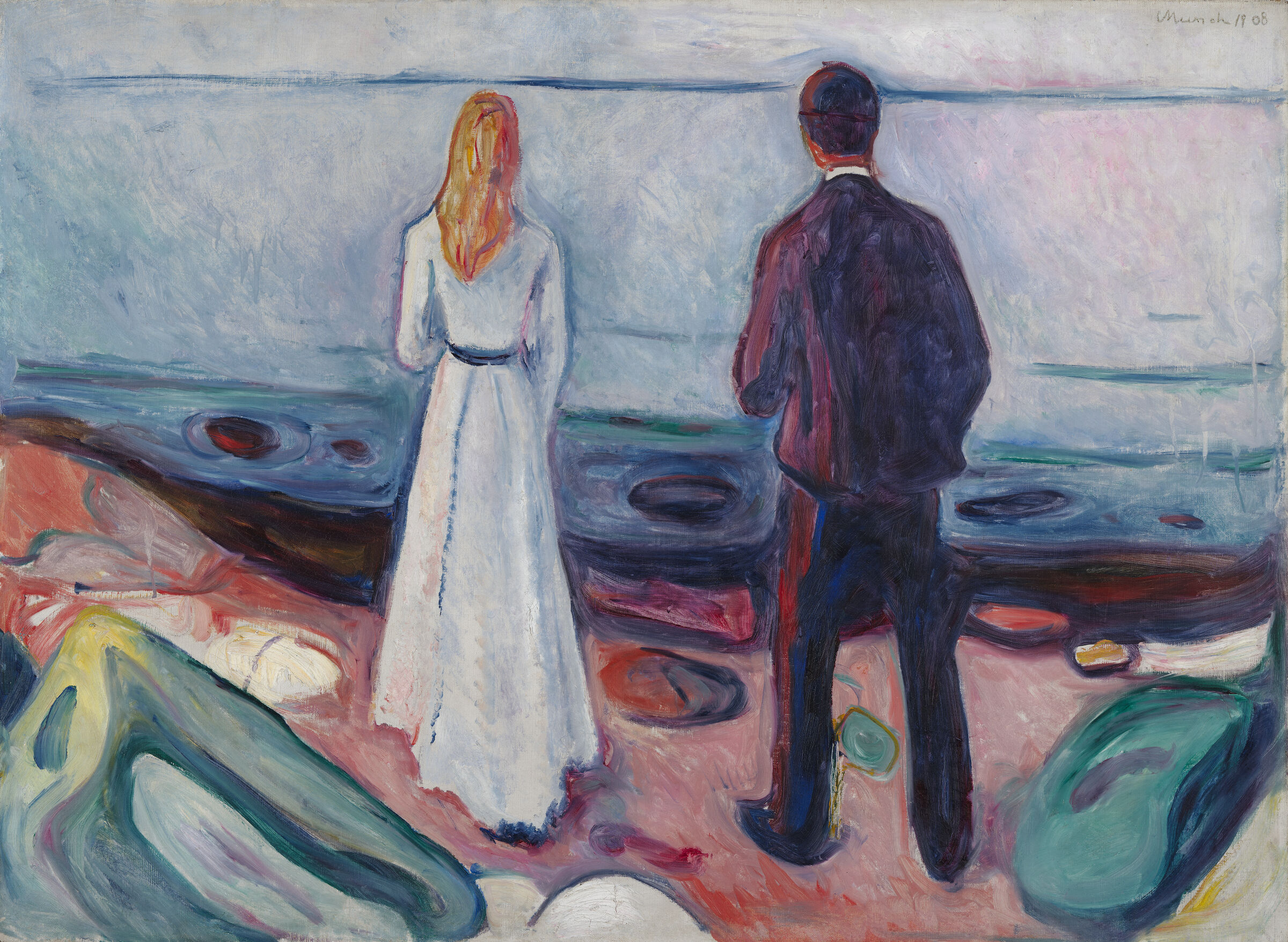
Two Human Beings. The Lonely Ones, 1905, oil on canvas, 81.3 cm × 111.5 cm (32 in × 44 in), Busch-Reisinger Museum, Cambridge, Massachusetts

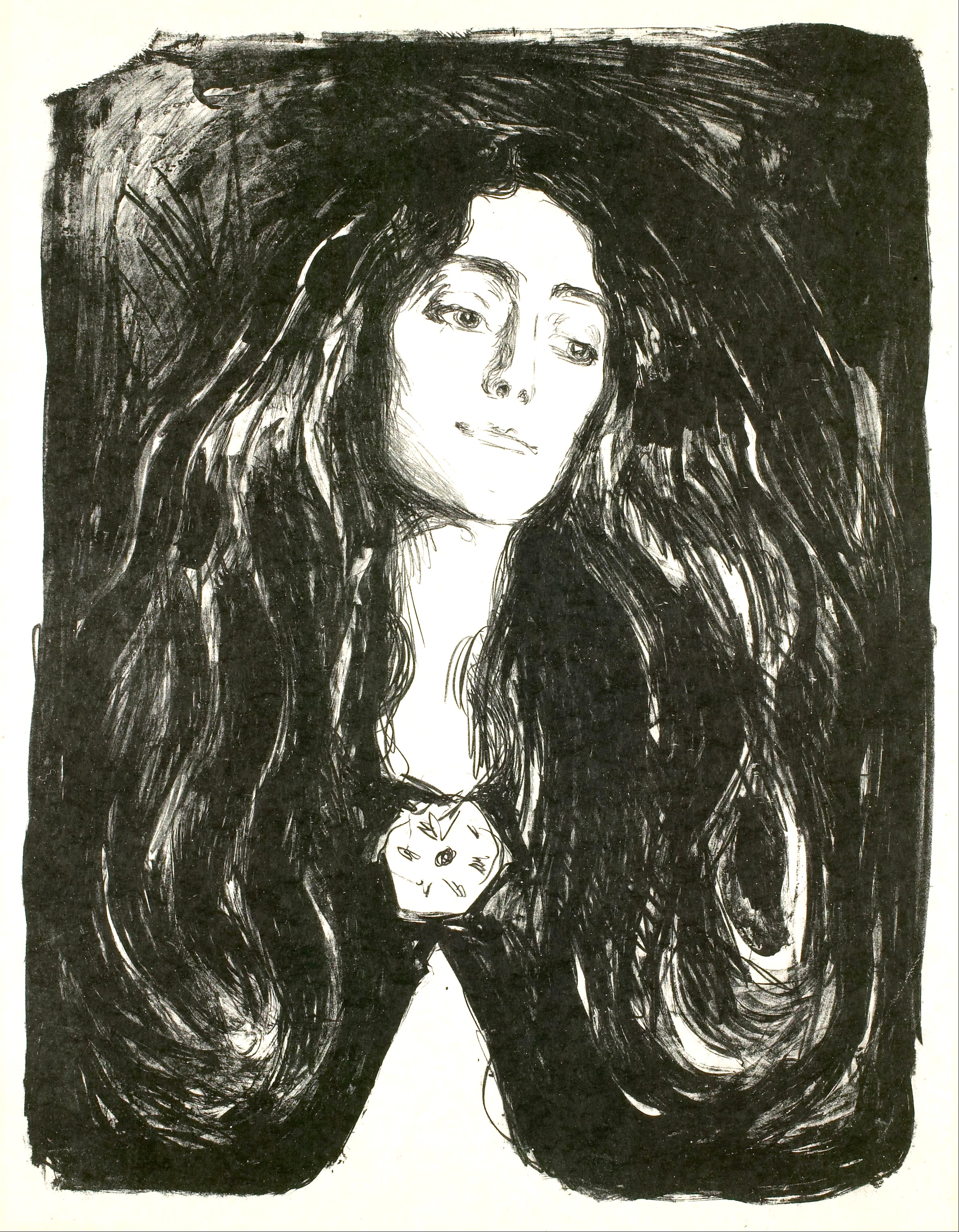
The Brooch, Eva Mudocci, 1903, lithograph print on paper, 76 cm × 53.2 cm (30 in × 21 in), Munch Museum, Oslo

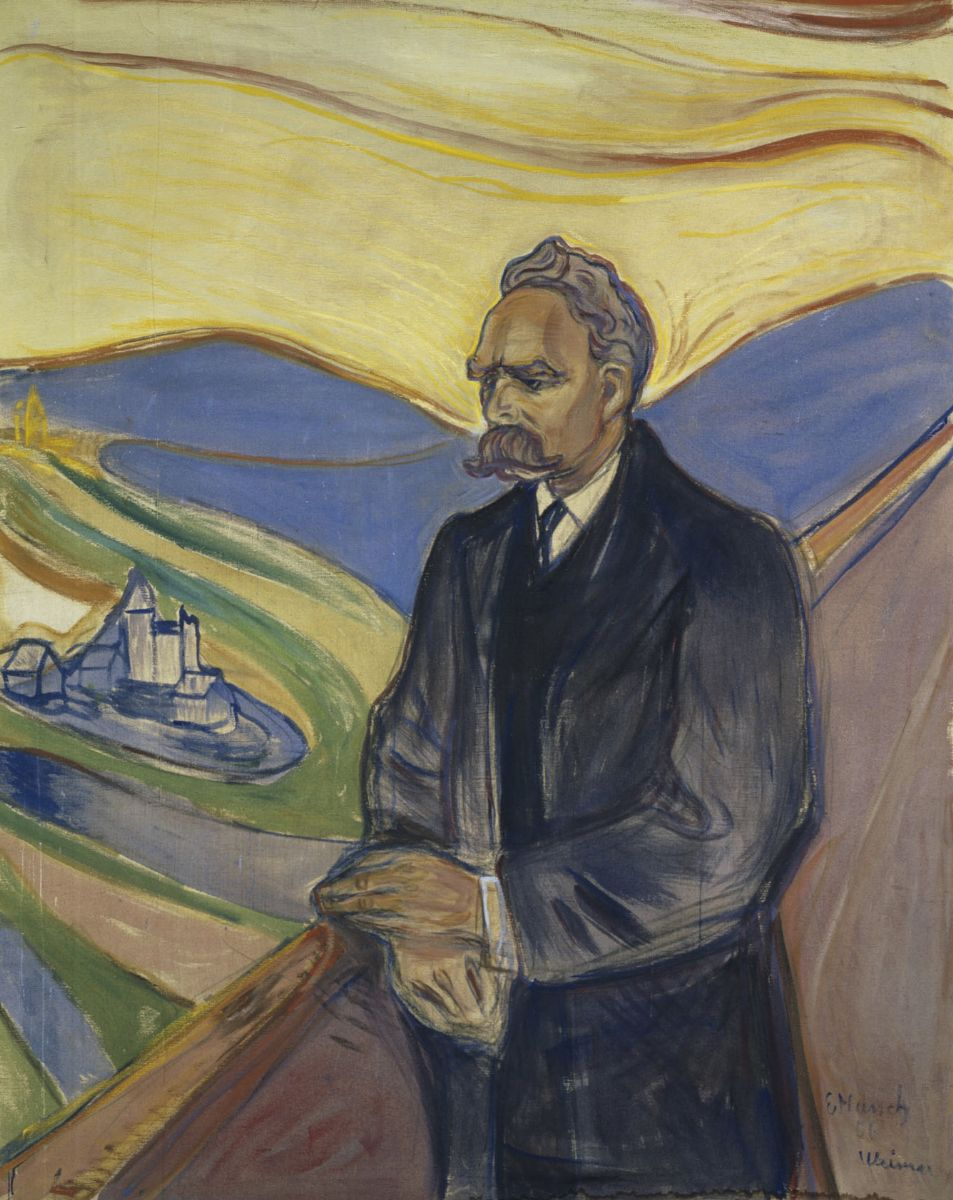
Portrait of Friedrich Nietzsche, 1906, Thiel Gallery, Stockholm

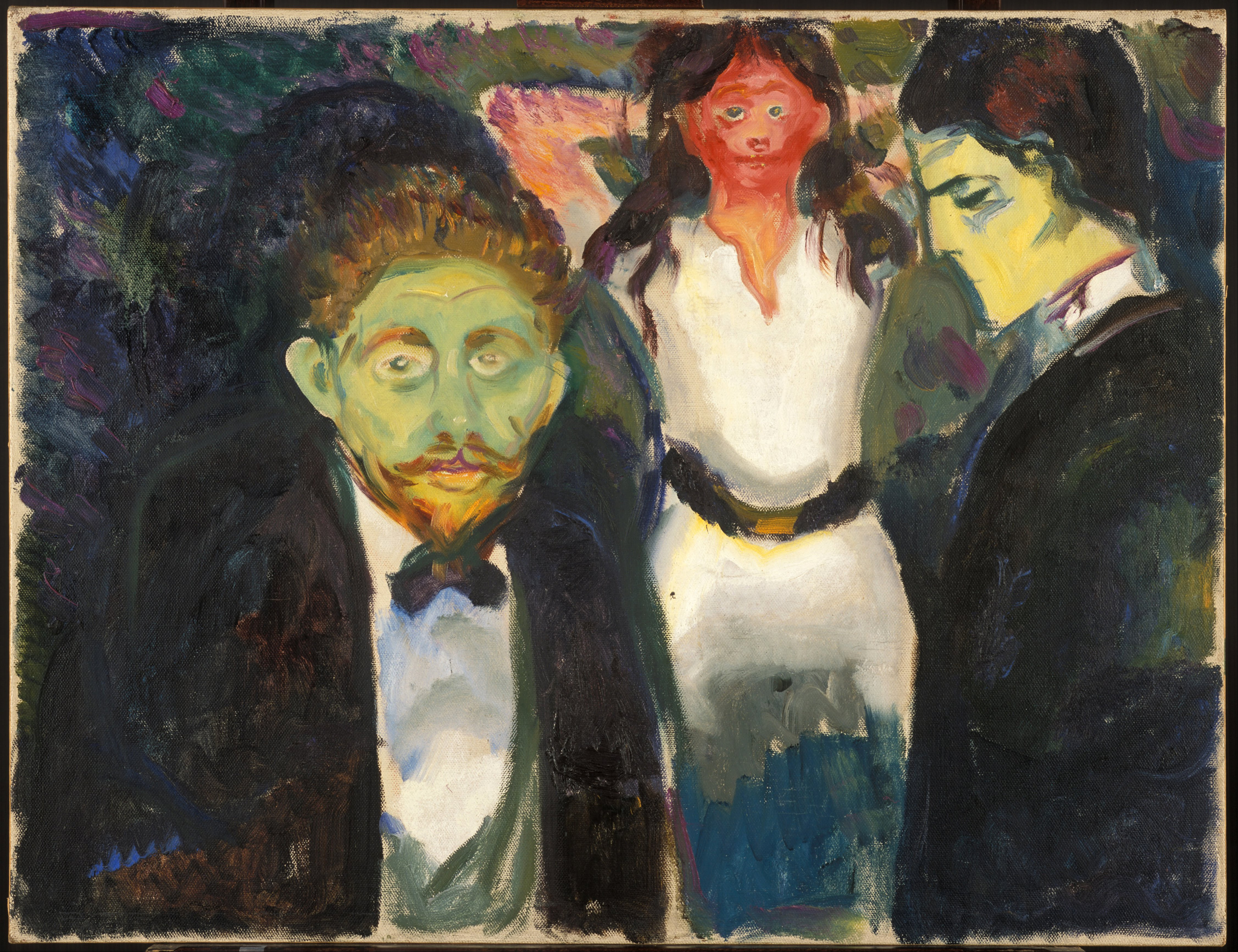
Jealousy, 1907, 75 cm × 98 cm (29 1/2 in × 38 1/2 in), Munch Museum, Oslo

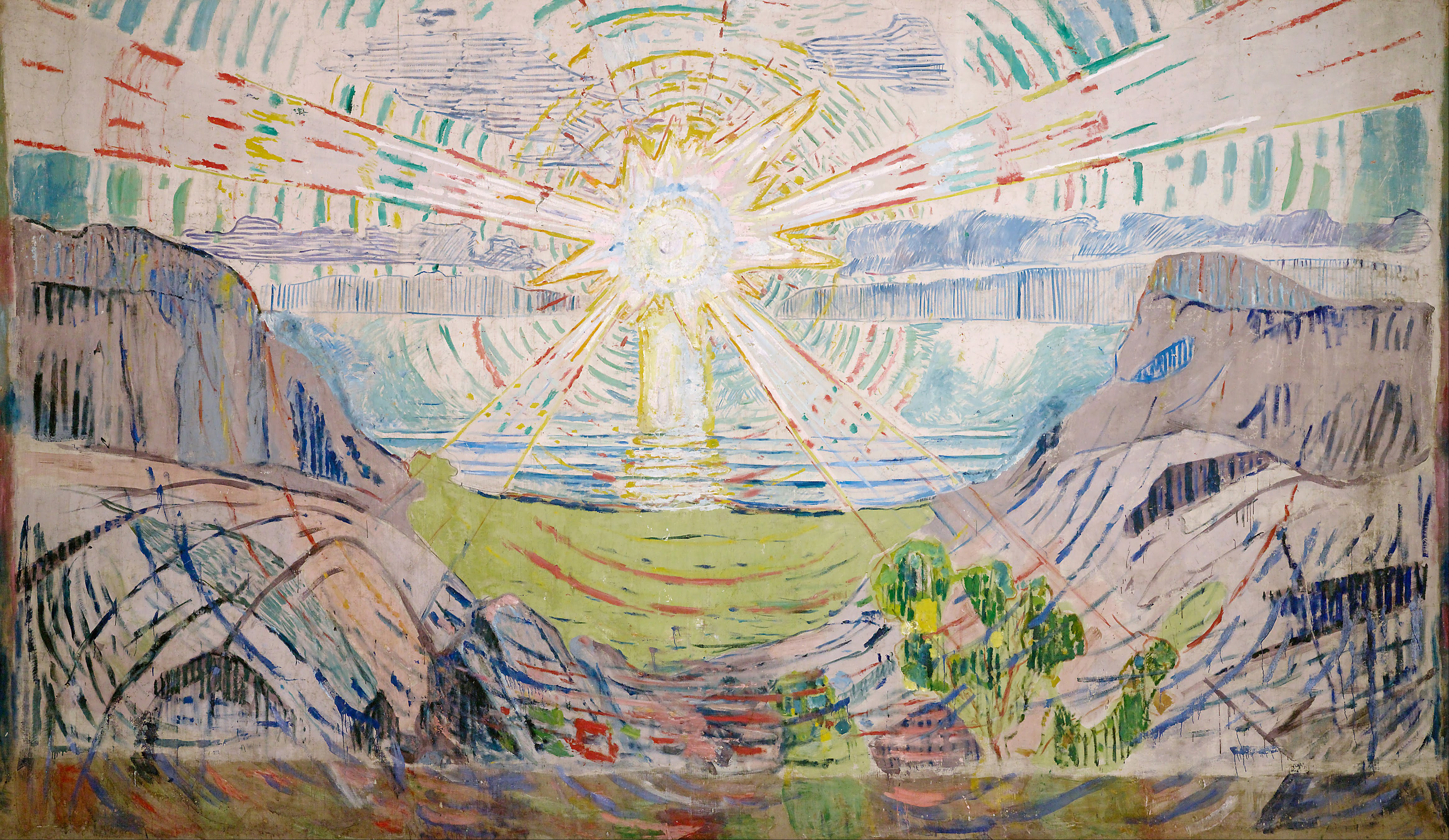
The Sun, 1910–1911, 450 cm × 772 cm (177 1/4 in × 304 in), Munch Museum, Oslo

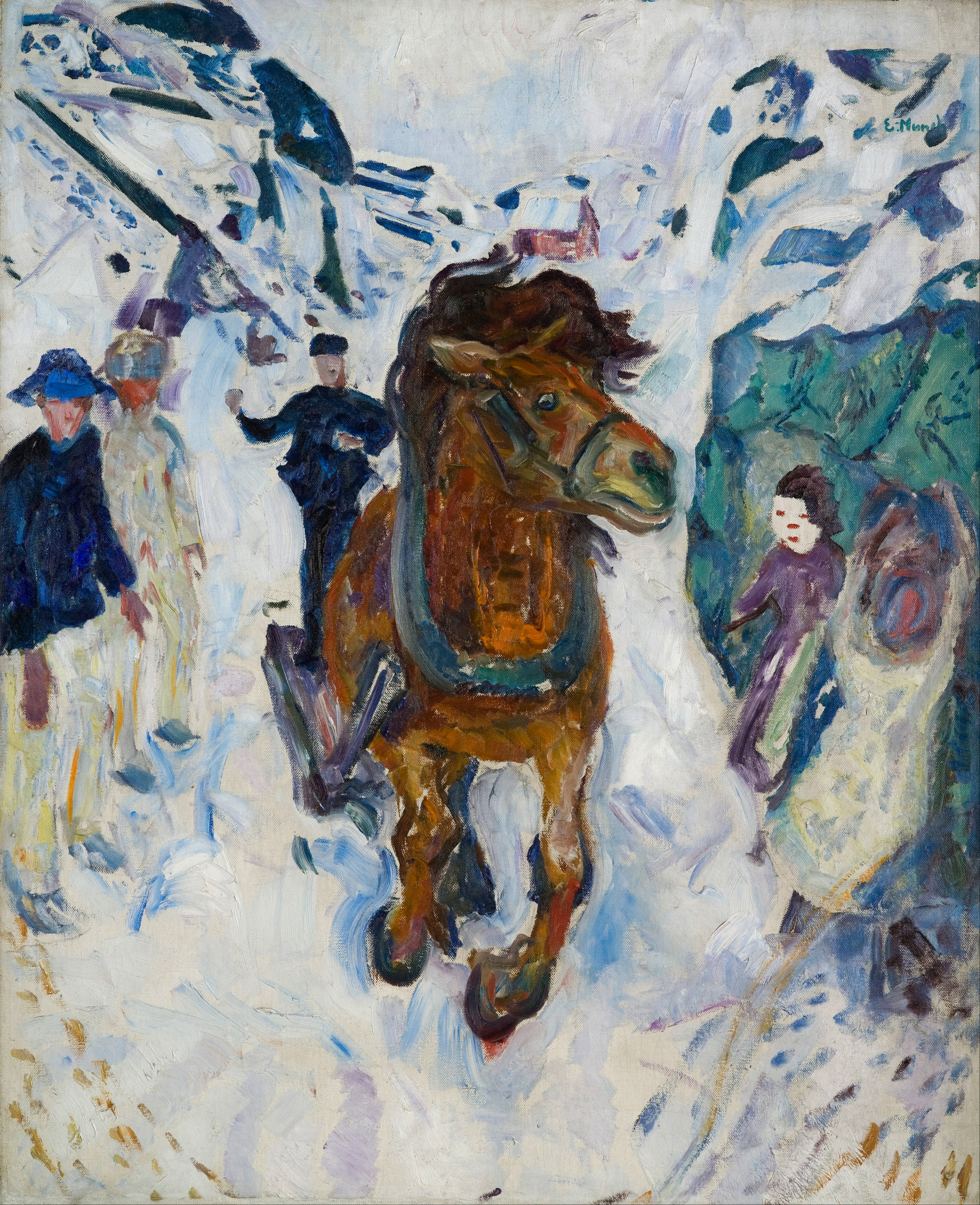
Galloping Horse, 1910–12, 148 cm × 120 cm (58 1/4 in × 47 1/4 in), Munch Museum, Oslo

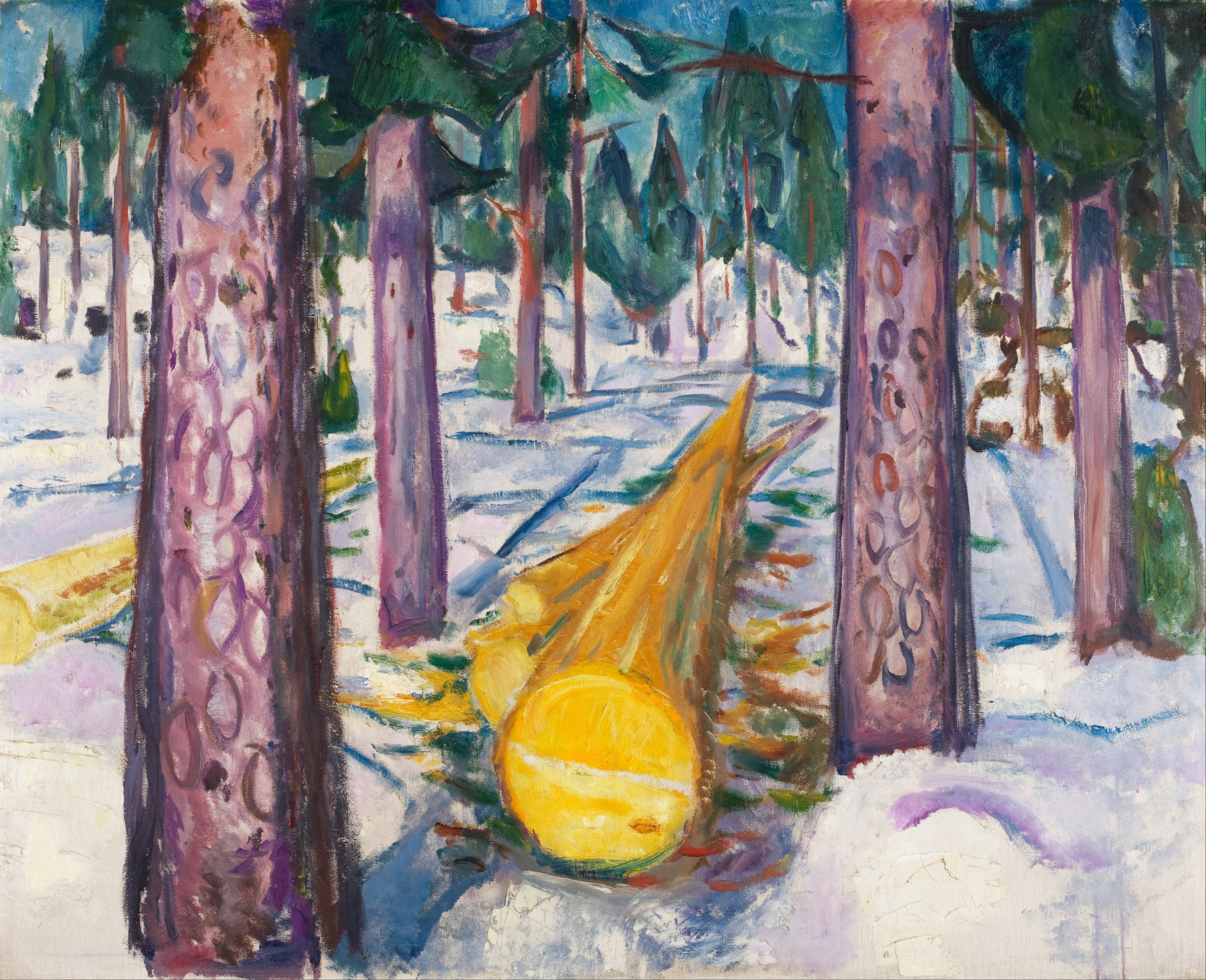
The Yellow Log, 1912, 129.5 cm × 159.5 cm (51 in × 62 3/4 in), Munch Museum, Oslo

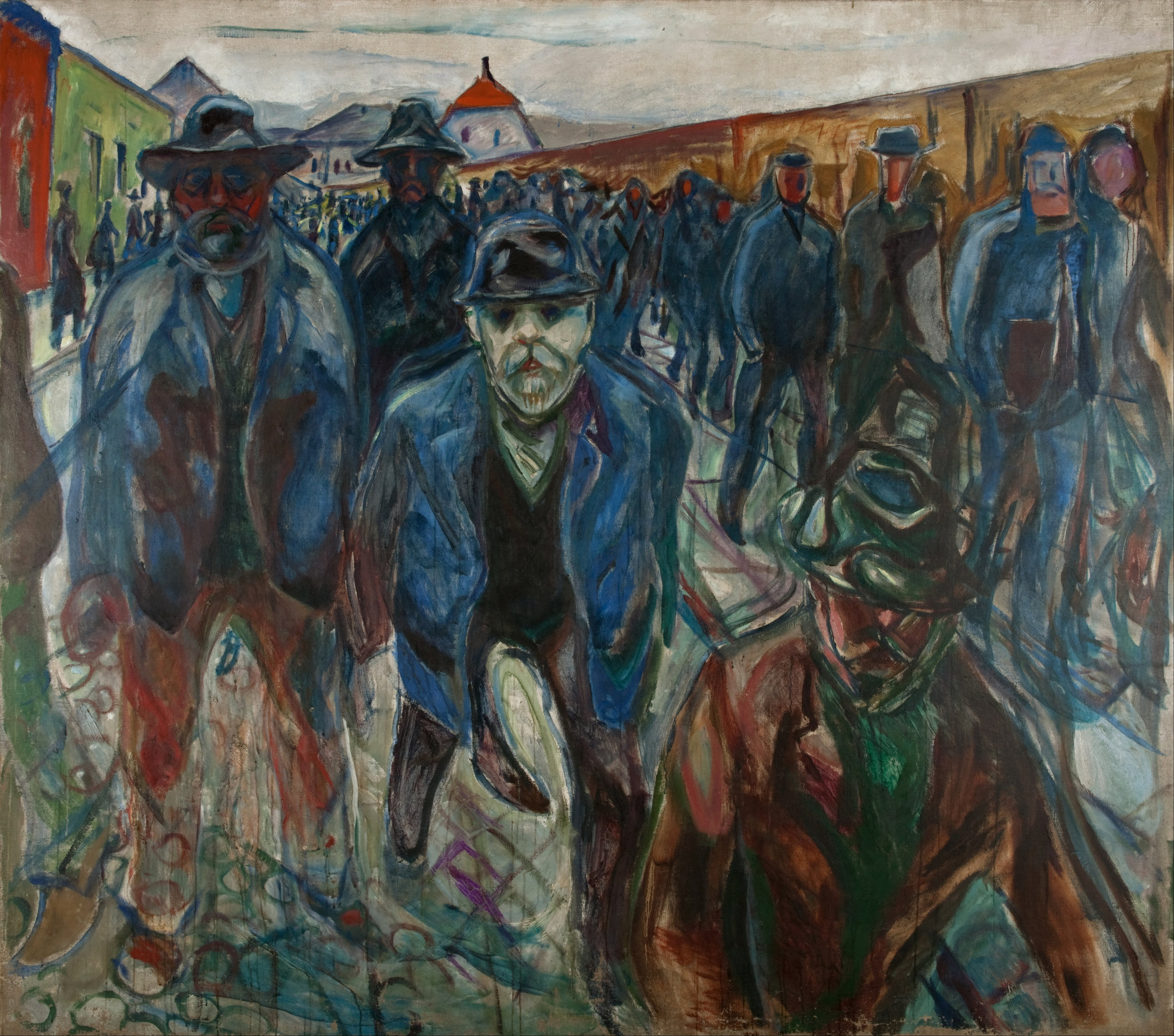
Workers on their Way Home, 1913–14, 227 cm × 201 cm (89 1/4 in × 79 1/4 in), Munch Museum, Oslo

=== Nudes ===
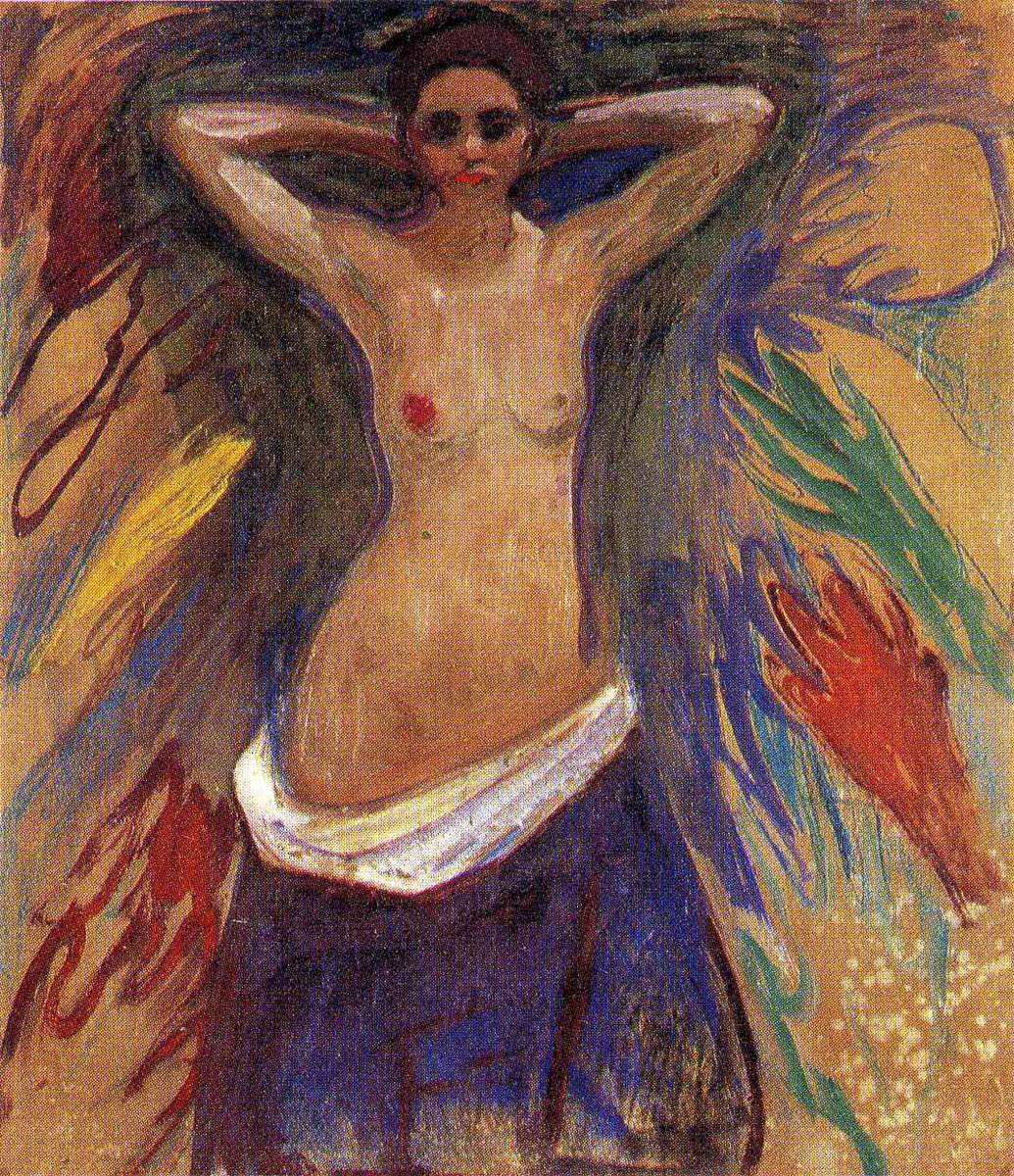
The Hands, 1893, oil on canvas, 91 x 77 cm, Munch Museum, Oslo

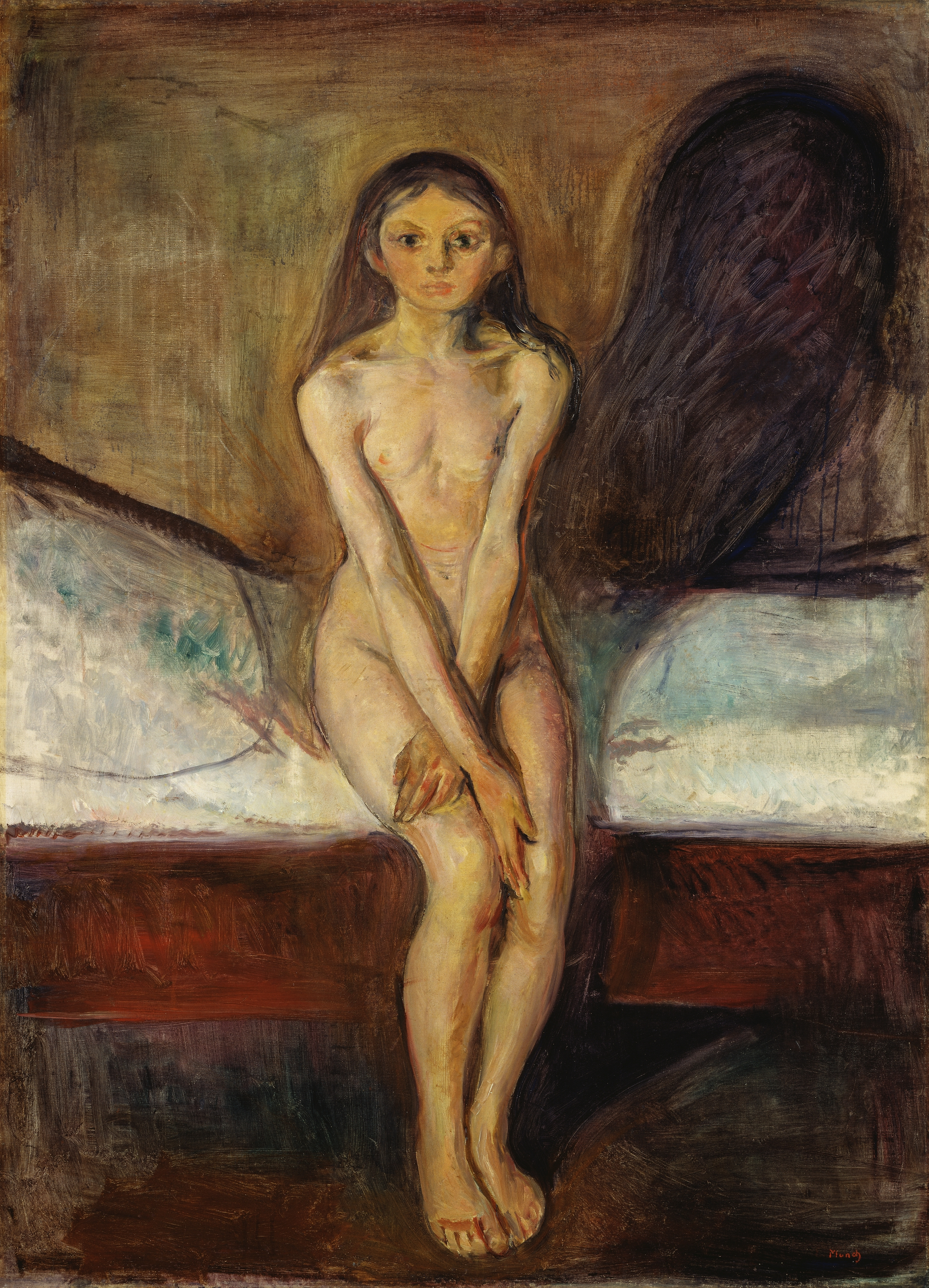
Puberty, 1894–1895, oil on canvas, 151.5 x 110 cm, National Gallery (Norway)

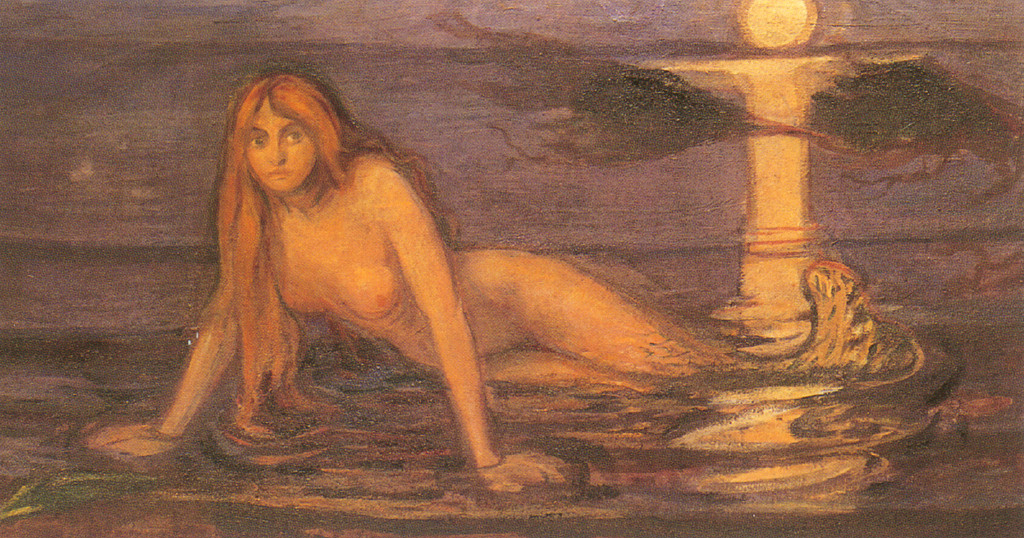
Mermaid (detail), 1896, oil on canvas. 100 cm × 320 cm (39 1/2 in × 126 in)

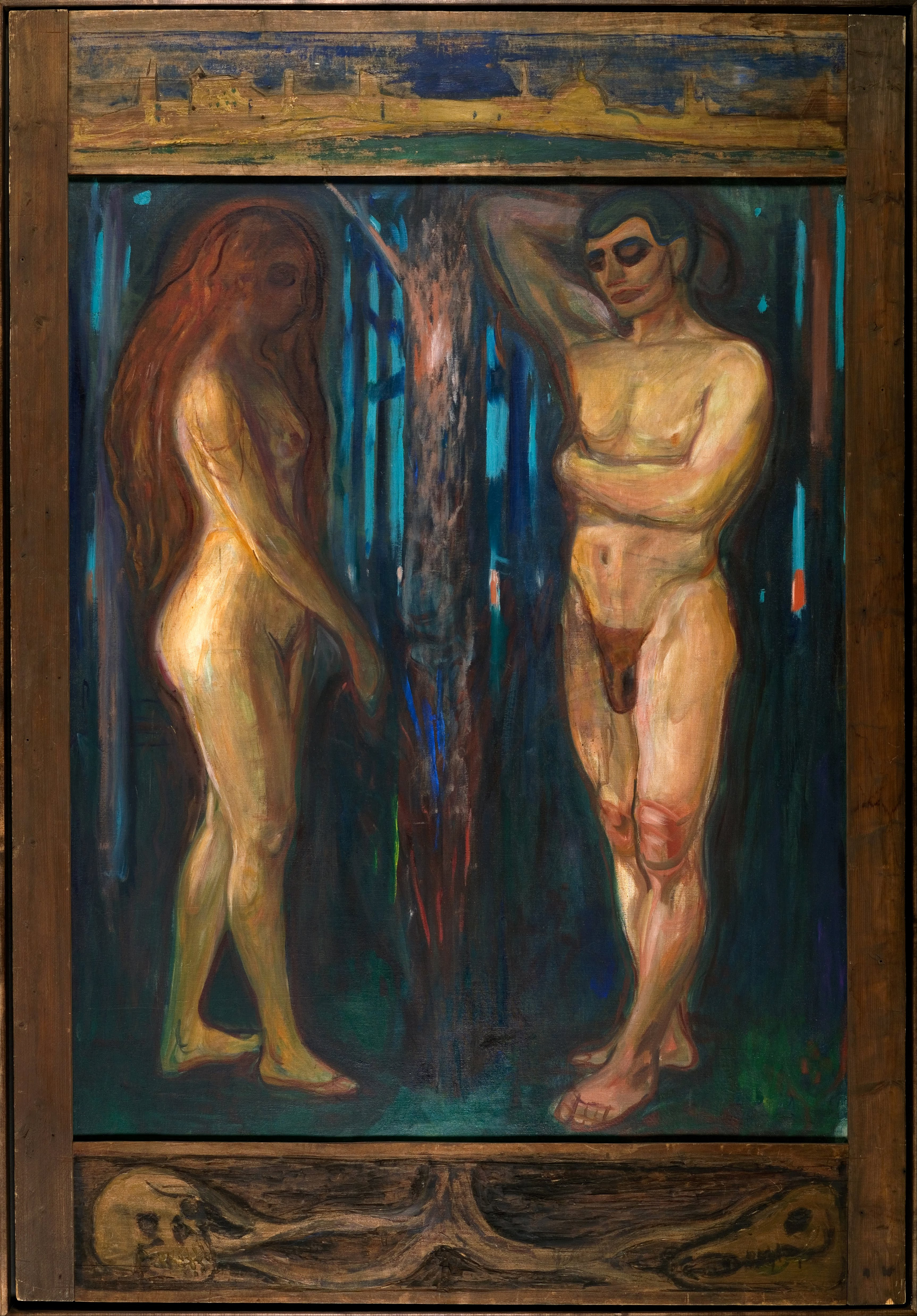
Metabolism, 1898–1899, 172 cm × 142 cm (67 3/4 in × 56 in), Munch Museum, Oslo

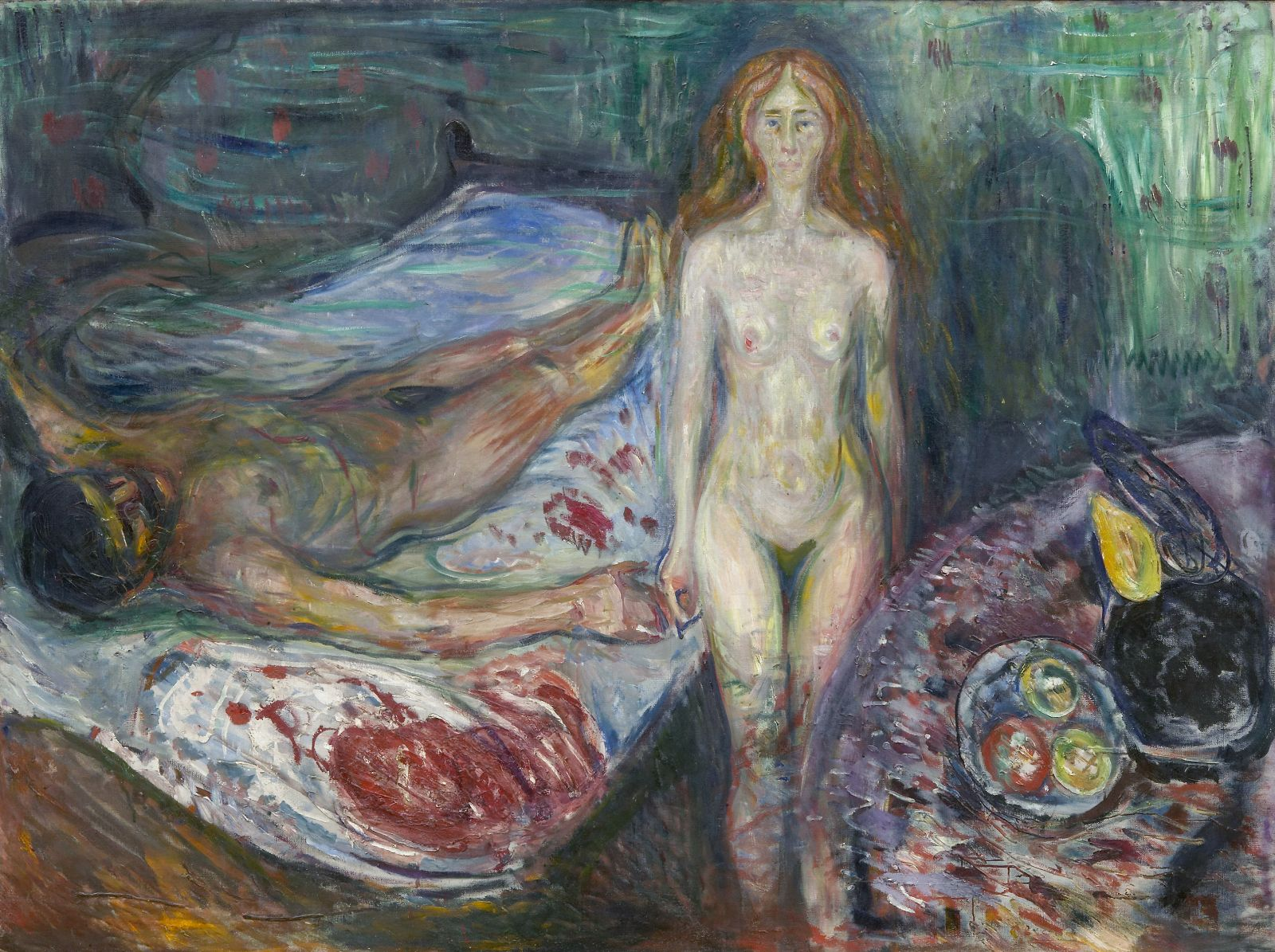
The Death of Marat 1907, 150 x 199 cm, Munch Museum, Oslo

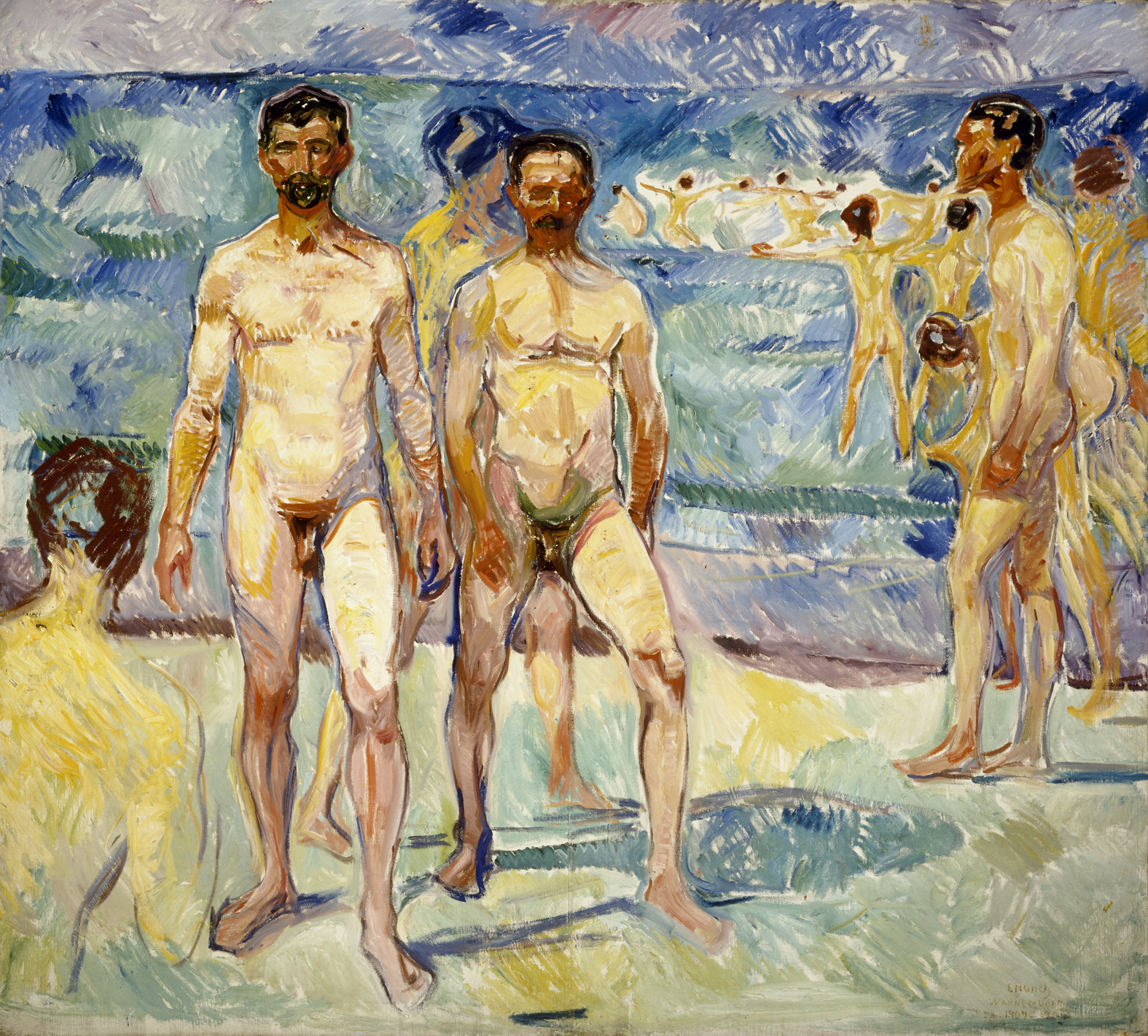
Bathing Men, 1907–1908, oil on canvas, 206 x 227.5 cm, Ateneum, Helsinki

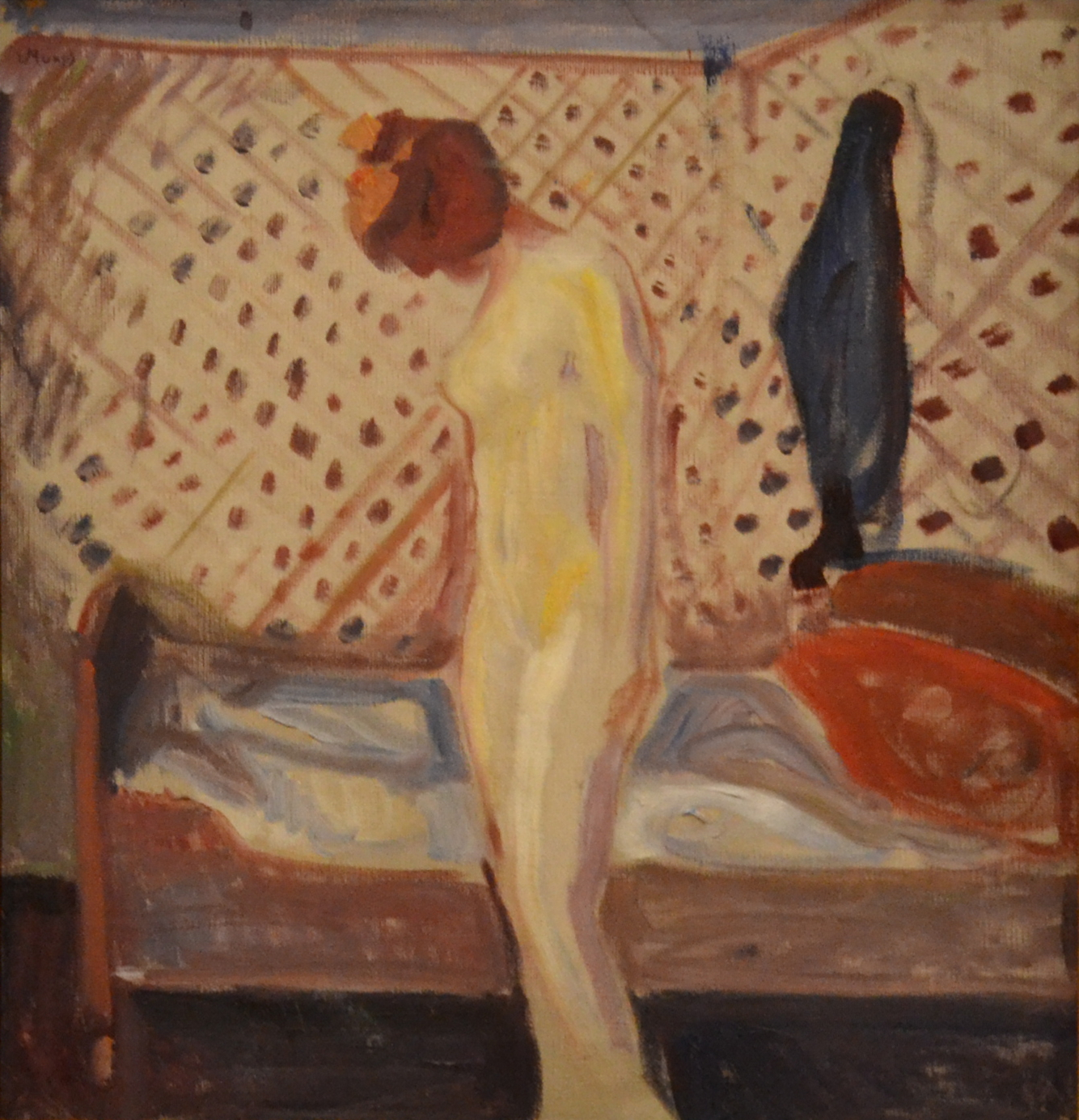
Weeping Woman, 1907–1909, oil on canvas, private collection

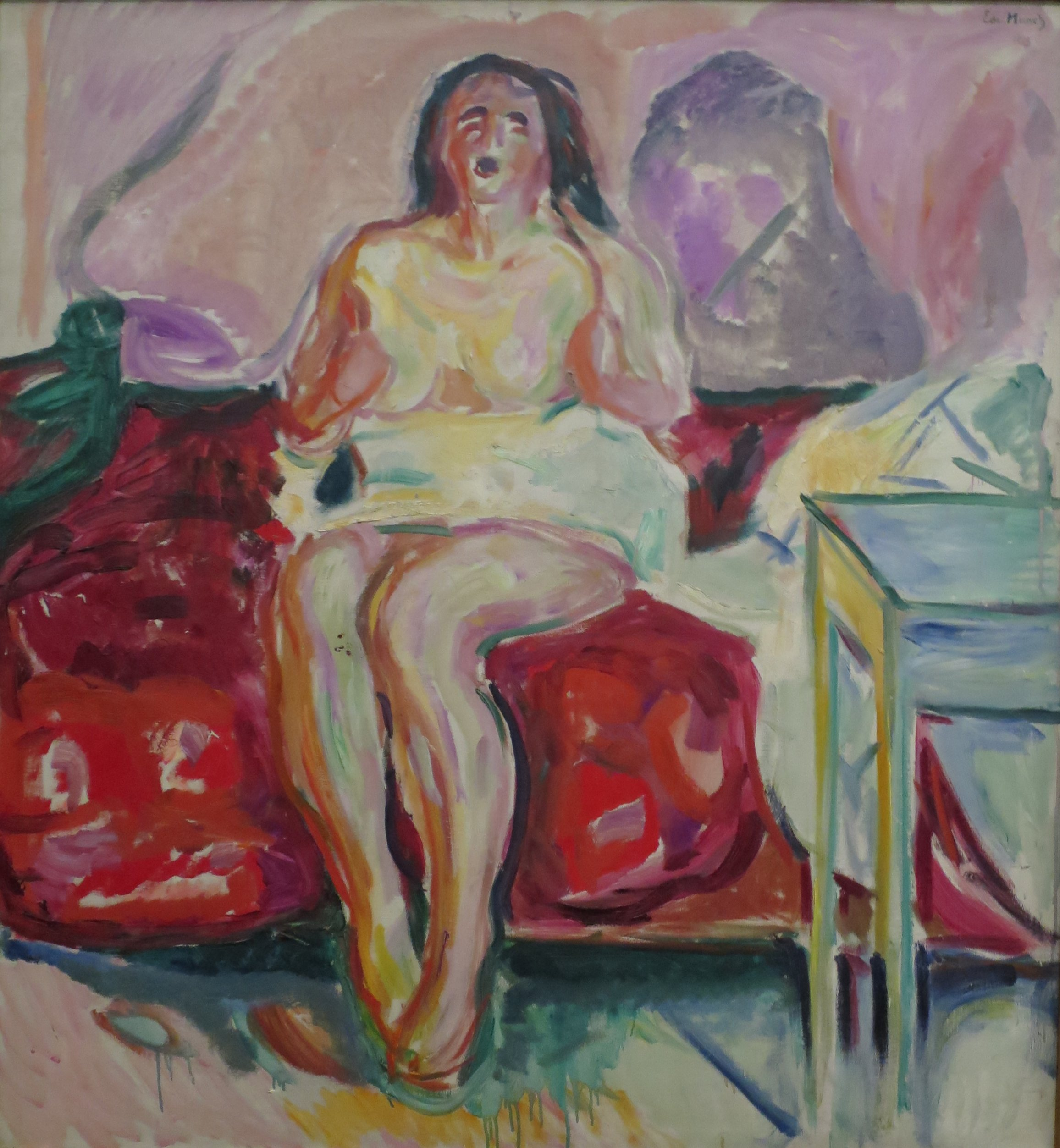
Morning Yawn, 1913, oil on canvas, 108 × 98 cm, Art Museums of Bergen

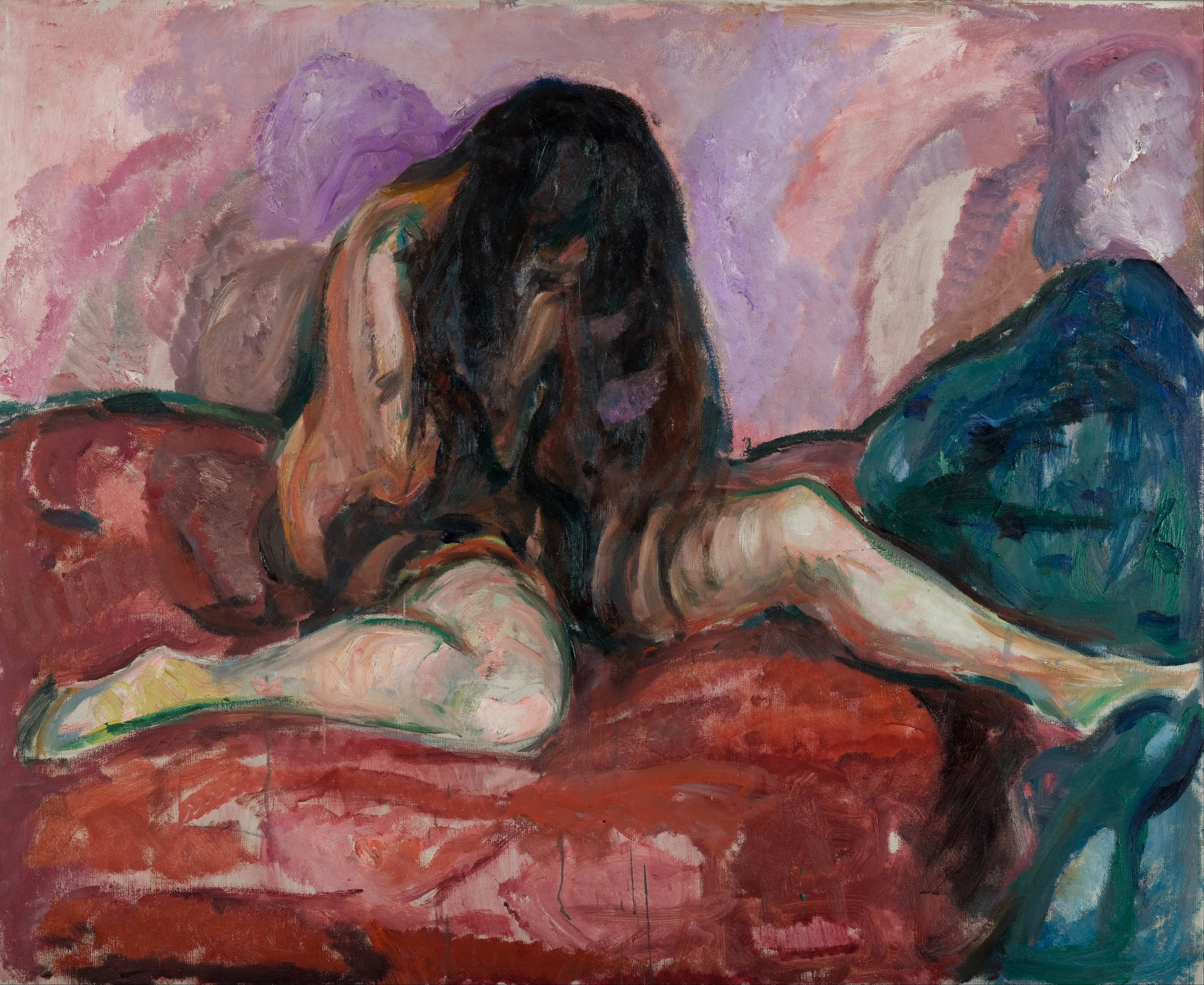
Weeping Nude, 1913–1914, 110 cm × 135 cm (43 1/4 in × 53 1/4 in), Munch Museum, Oslo

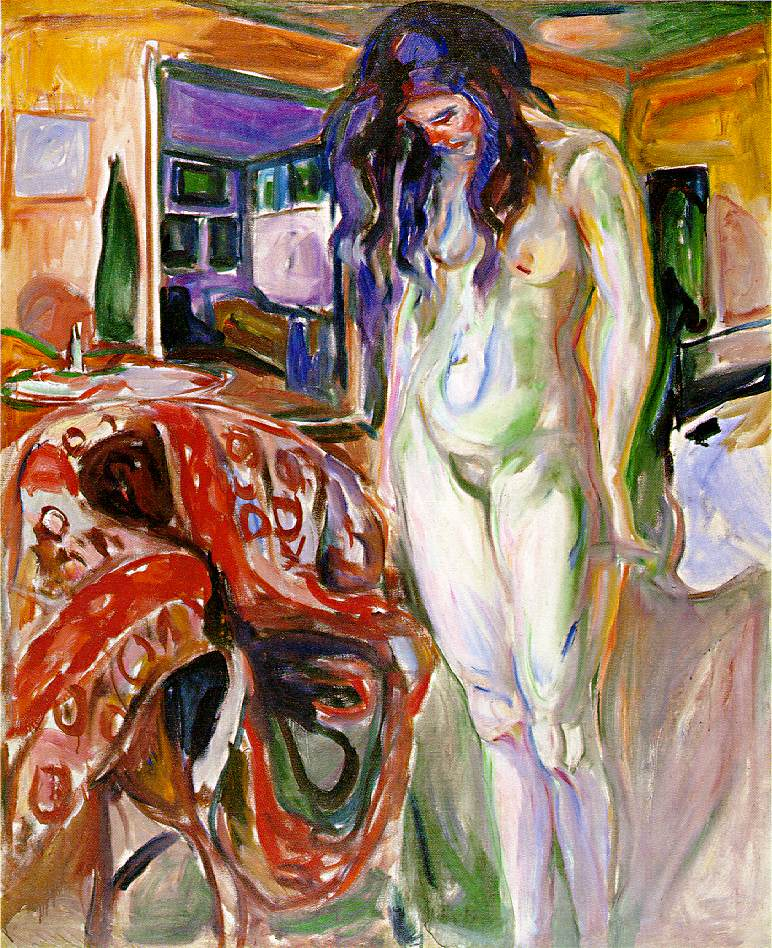
Model by the Wicker Chair, 1919–1921, oil on canvas, 122.5 × 100 cm, Munch Museum, Oslo

=== Self-portraits ===
==== See also: Self-portraiture ====
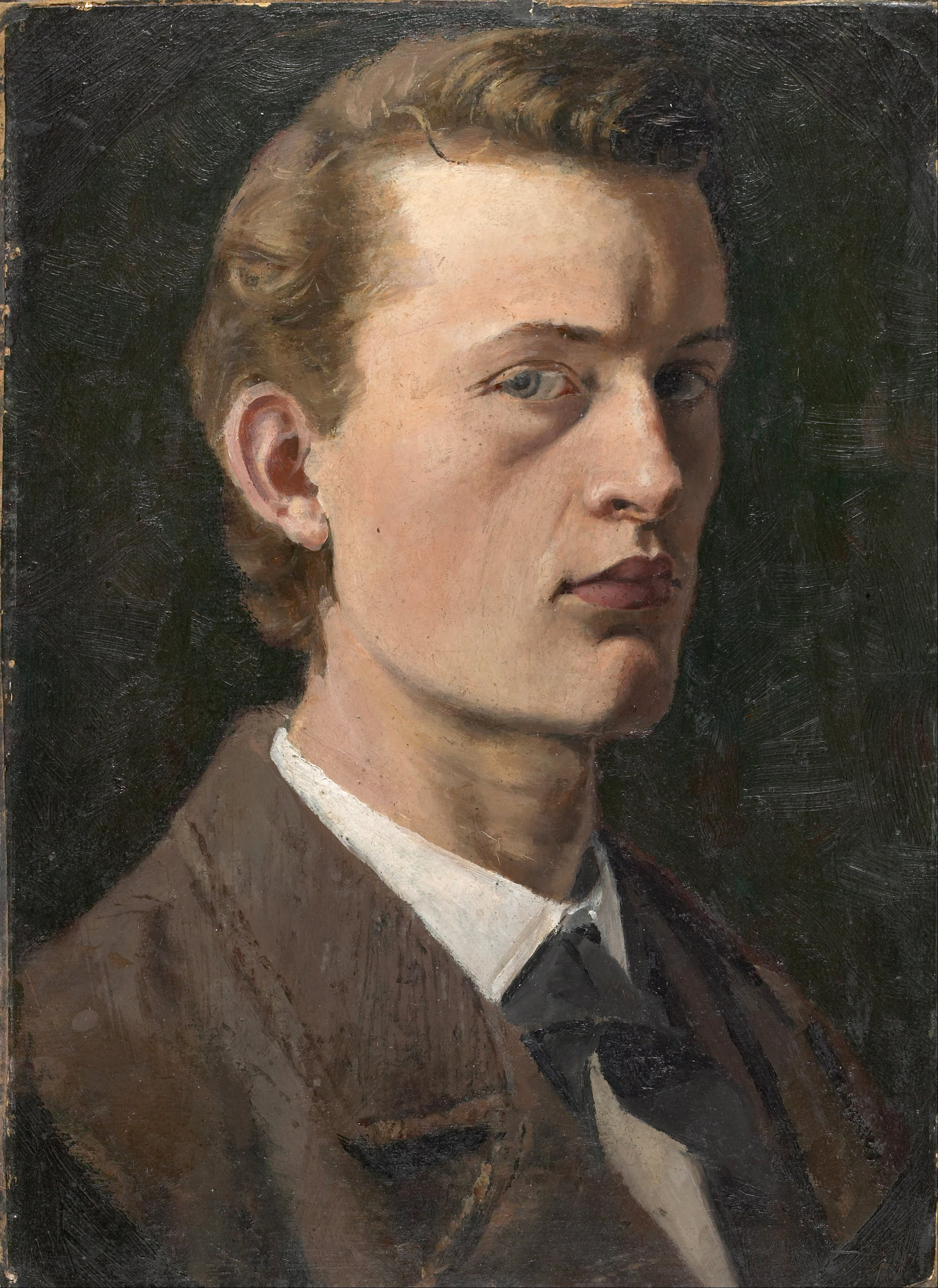
Self-Portrait, 1882, 26 cm × 19 cm (10 1/4 in × 7 1/2 in), Munch Museum, Oslo

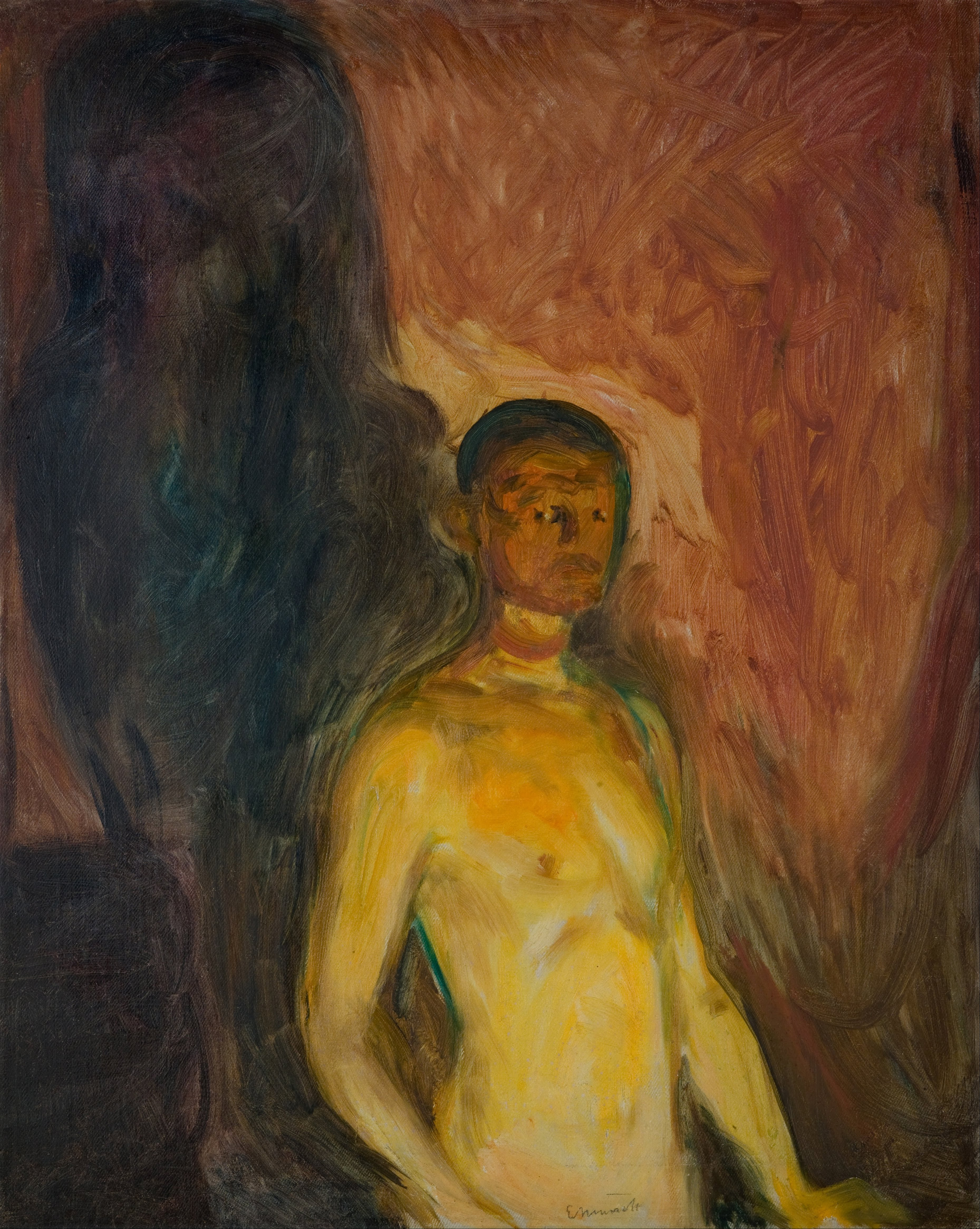
Self-Portrait in Hell, 1903, 82 cm × 66 cm (32 1/4 in × 26 in), Munch Museum, Oslo

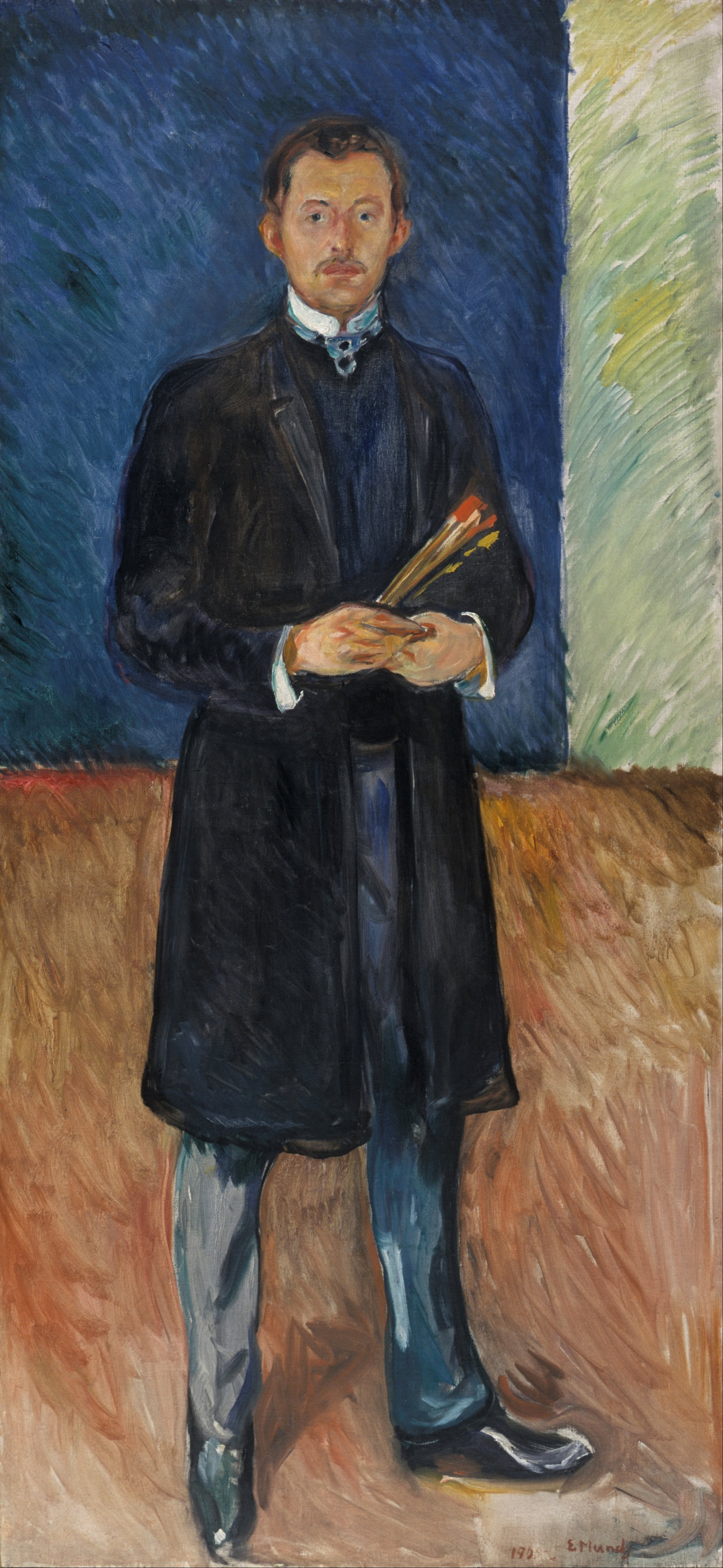
Self-Portrait with Brushes, 1904, 197 cm × 91 cm (77 1/2 in × 35 3/4 in), Munch Museum, Oslo

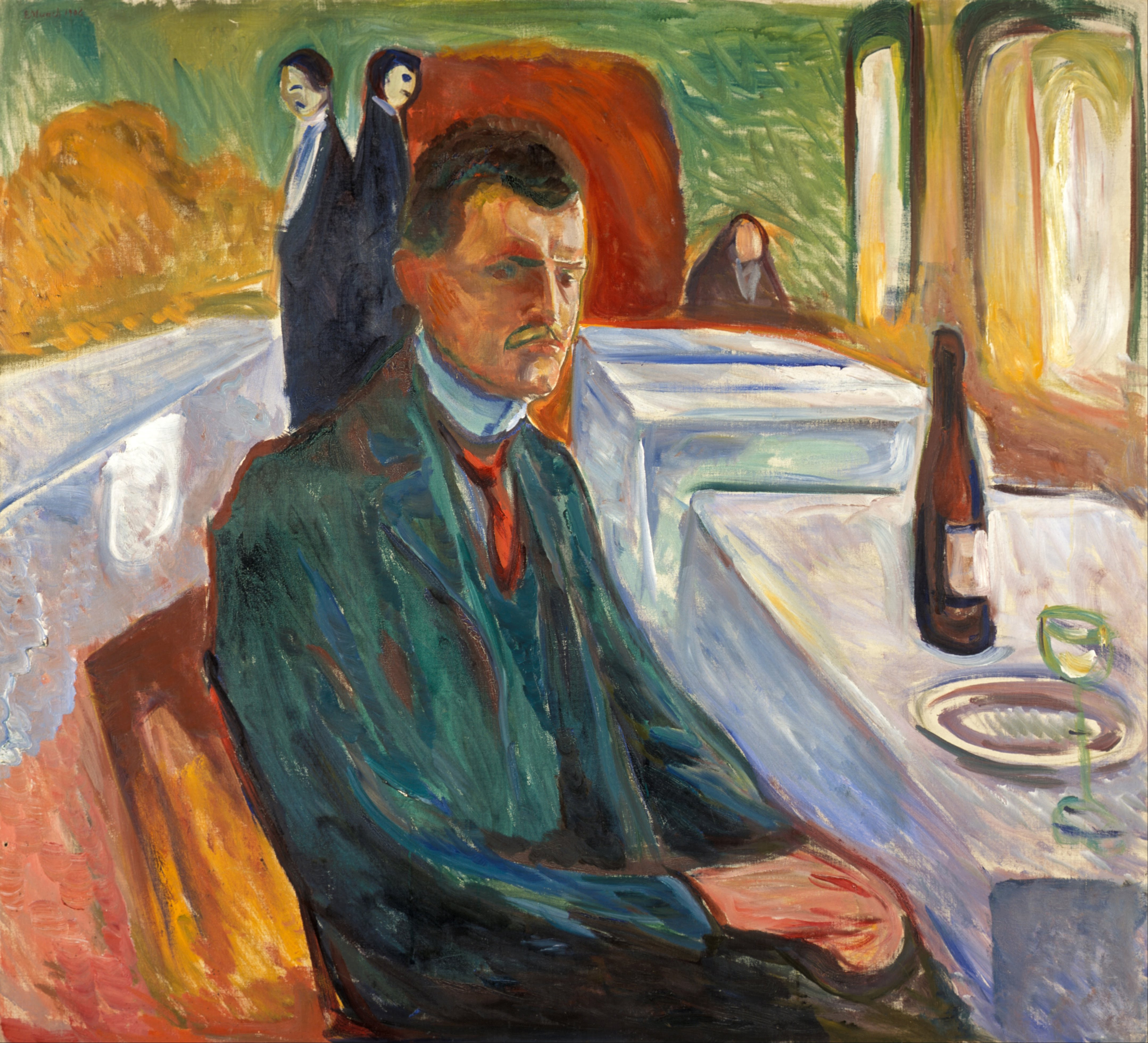
Self-Portrait with a Bottle of Wine, 1906, 110 cm × 120 cm (43 1/4 in × 47 1/4 in), Munch Museum, Oslo

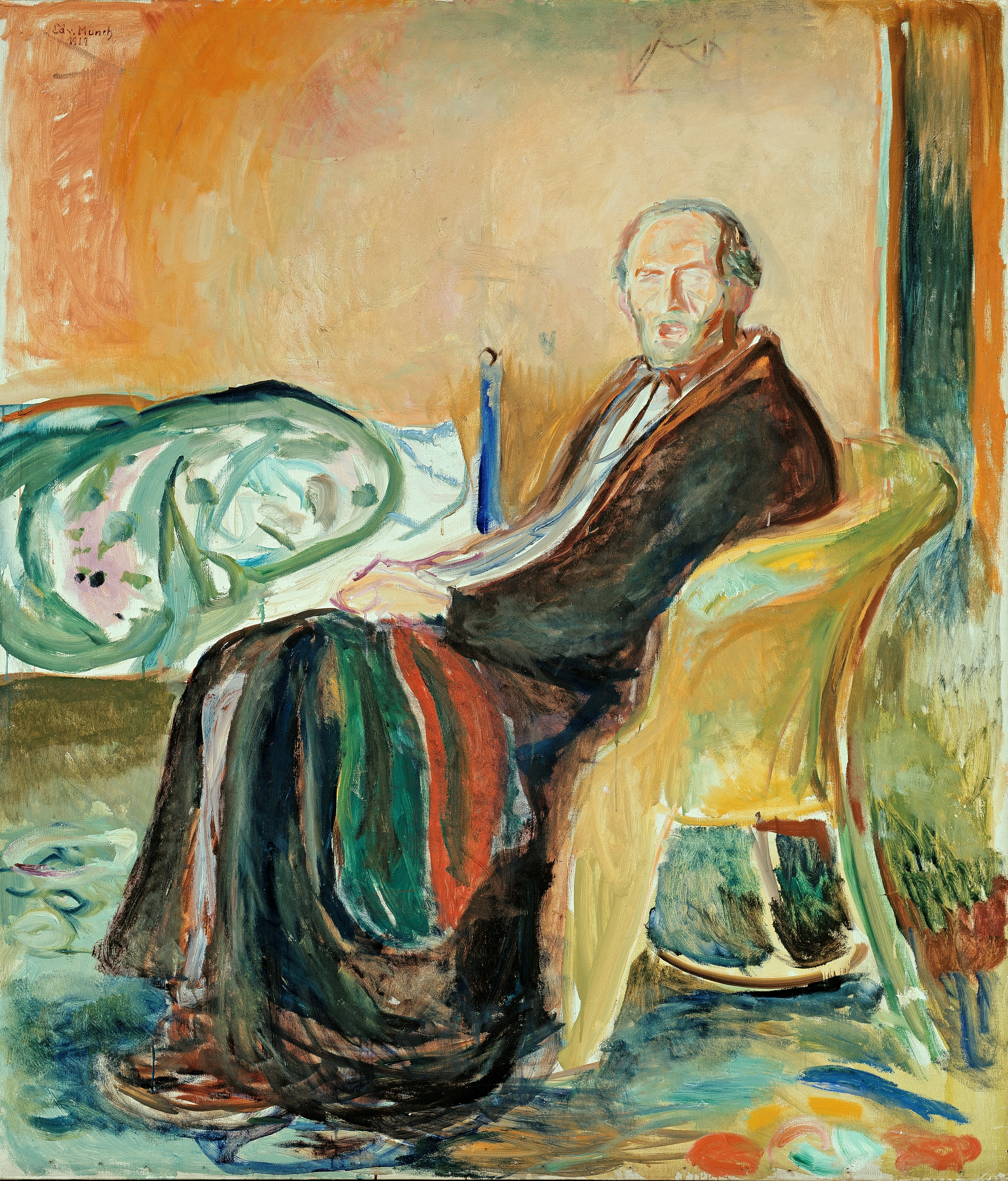
Self-Portrait with the Spanish Flu, 1919, oil on canvas, 150 x 131 cm, National Gallery (Norway)

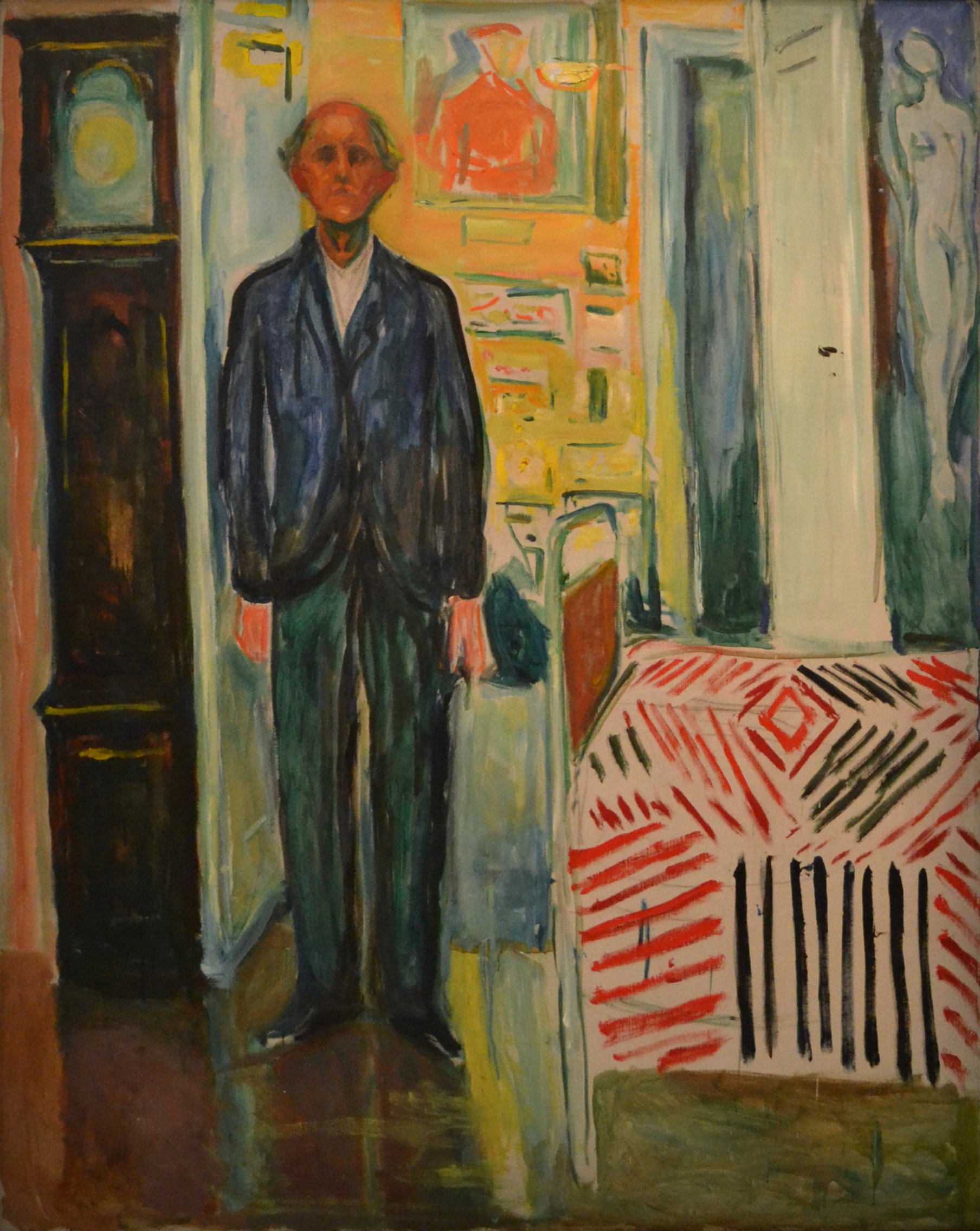
Self-Portrait. Between the Clock and the Bed. c. 1940–1943, Munch Museum, Oslo

=== Landscapes ===
Small Lake with Boat, 1880, oil on paper on board, 12 x 18 cm, Munch Museum, Oslo

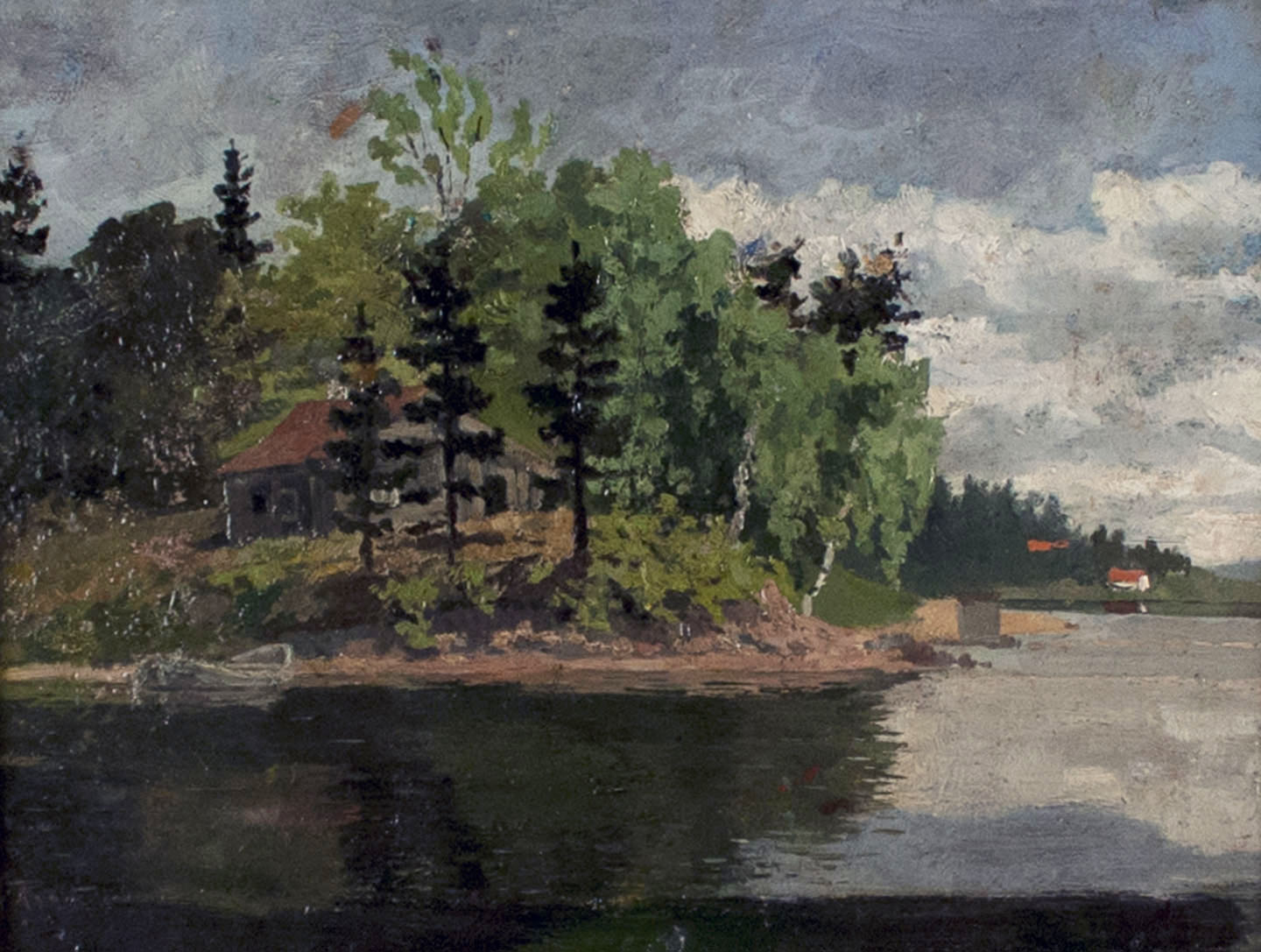
From Sandviken, c. 1882, oil on cardboard, 20 x 25 cm, Flaten Art Museum

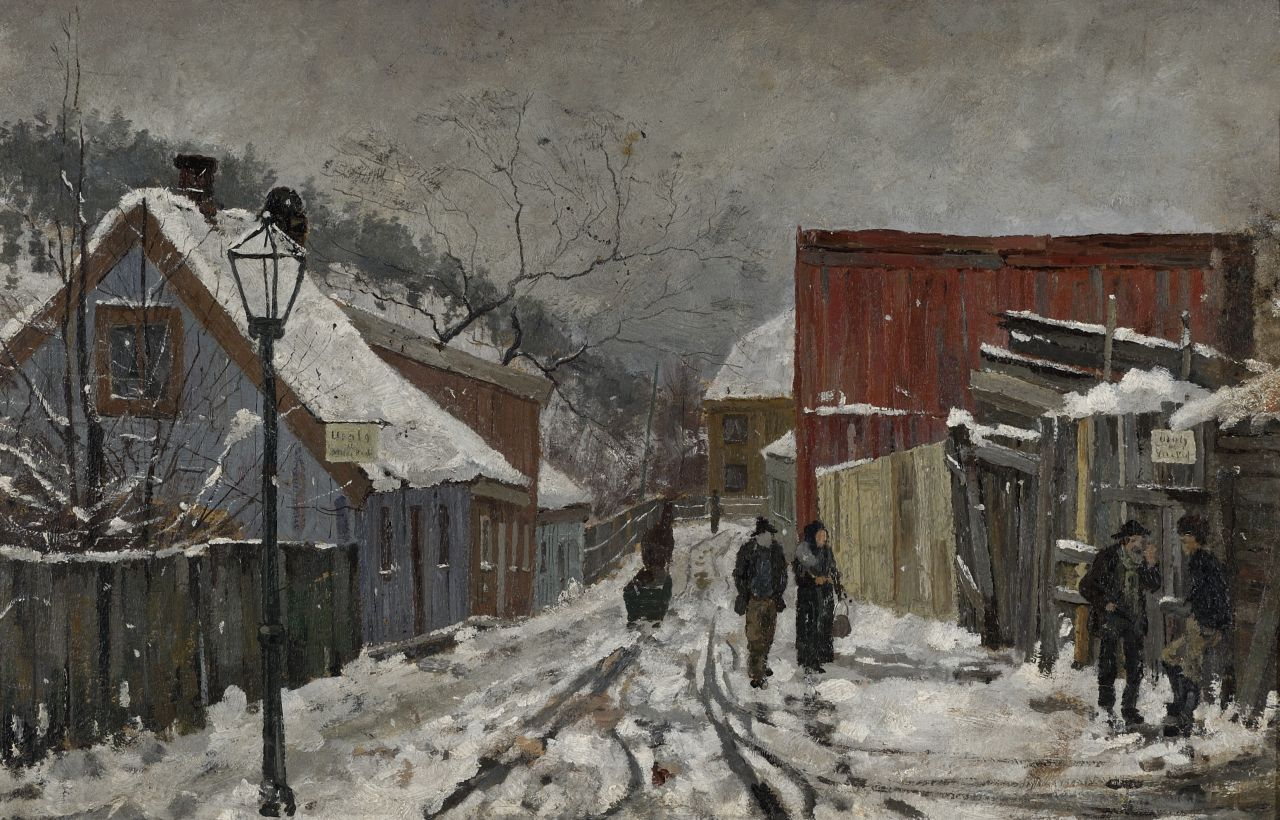
From Saxegårdsgate, c. 1882, oil on canvas, Lillehammer Art Museum, Lillehammer

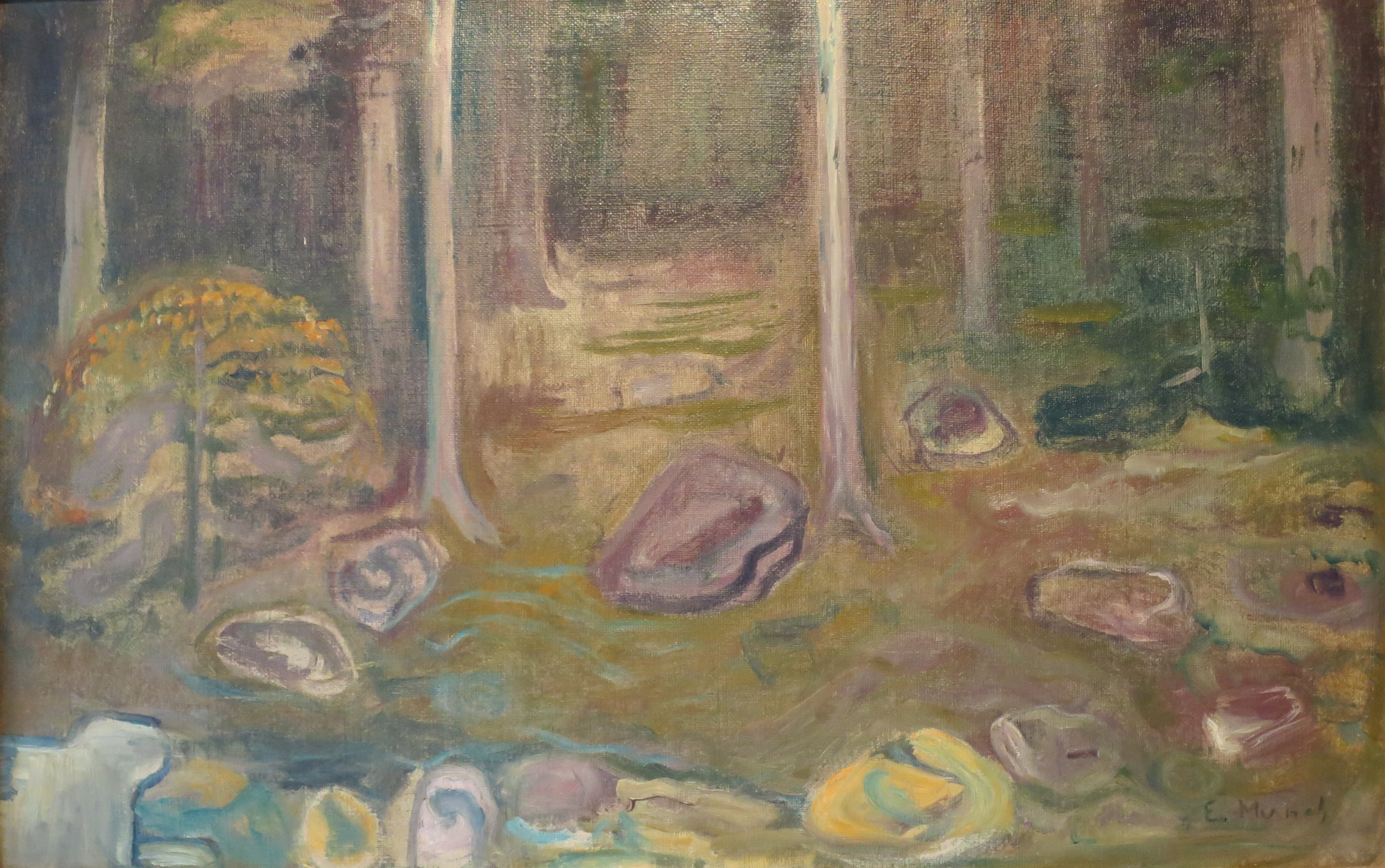
Sketch for 'Ashes' , 1894, oil on canvas, Bergen Kunstmuseum

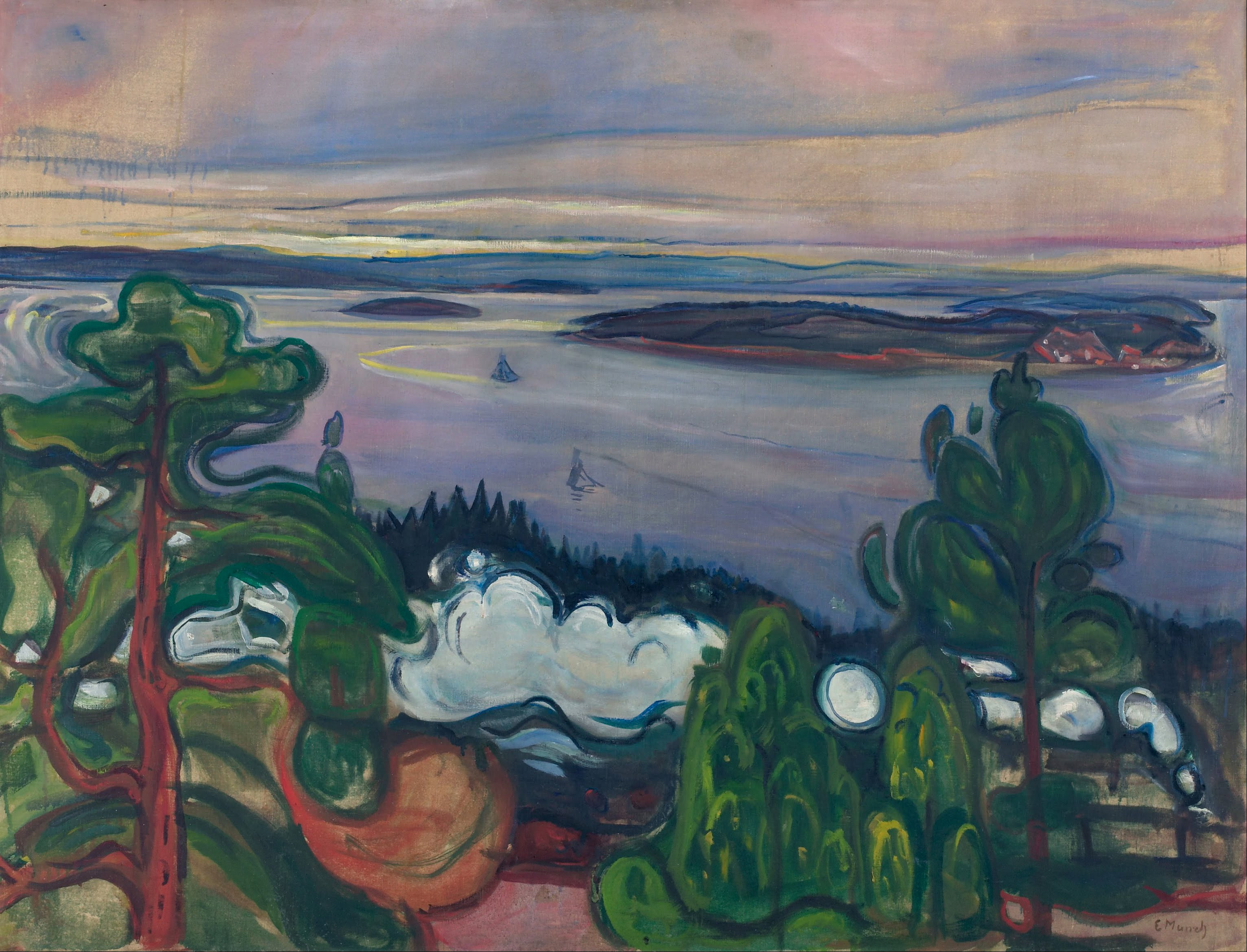
Train Smoke, 1900, 84 cm × 109 cm (33 in × 43 in), Munch Museum, Oslo

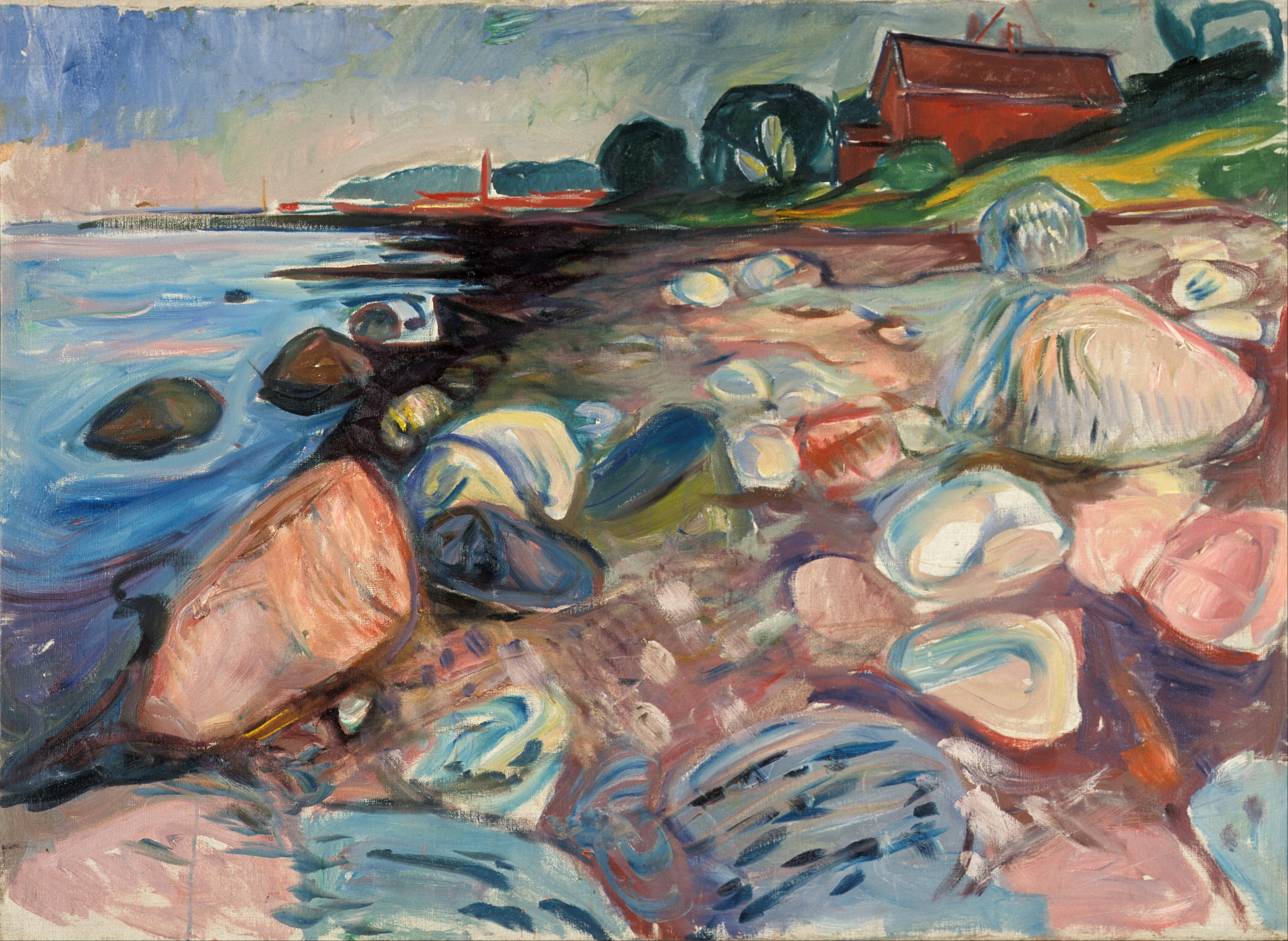
Shore with Red House, 1904, oil on canvas, 69 × 109 cm, Munch Museum, Oslo

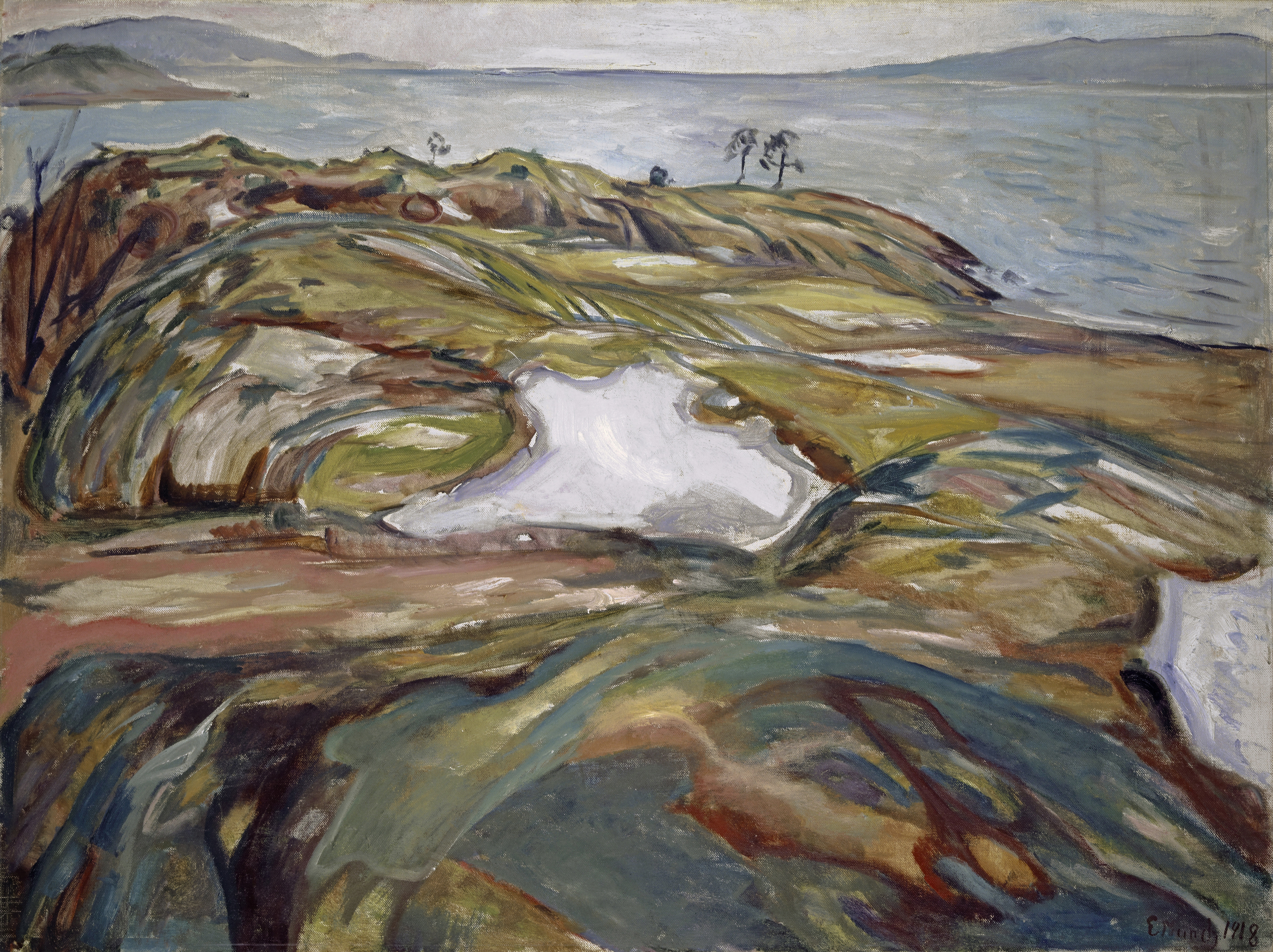
Landscape at the Sea, 1918, oil on canvas, 120.9 x 160, Kunstmuseum Basel

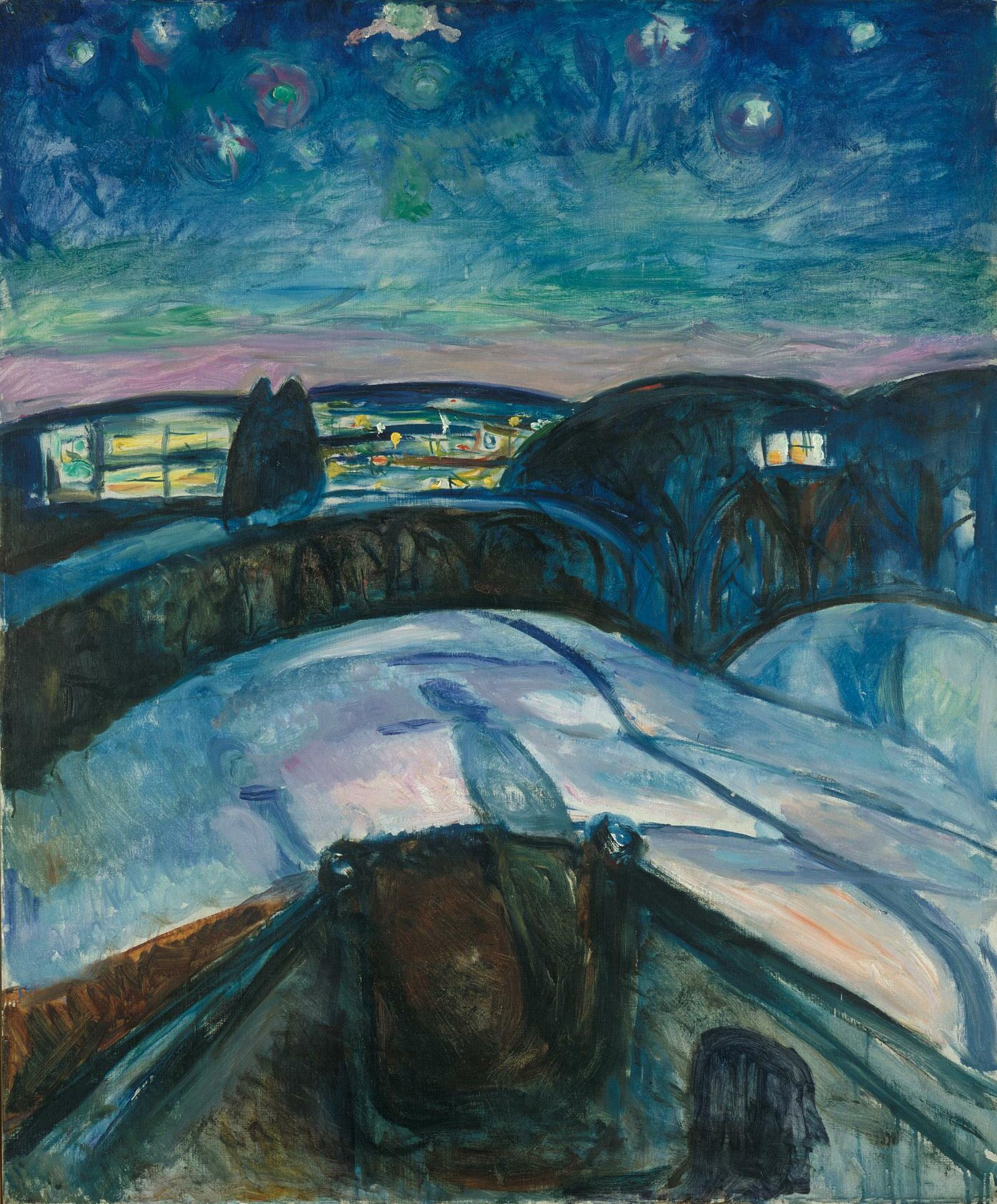
Starry Night, 1922–1924, oil on canvas, 120.5 x 100 cm, Munch Museum, Oslo

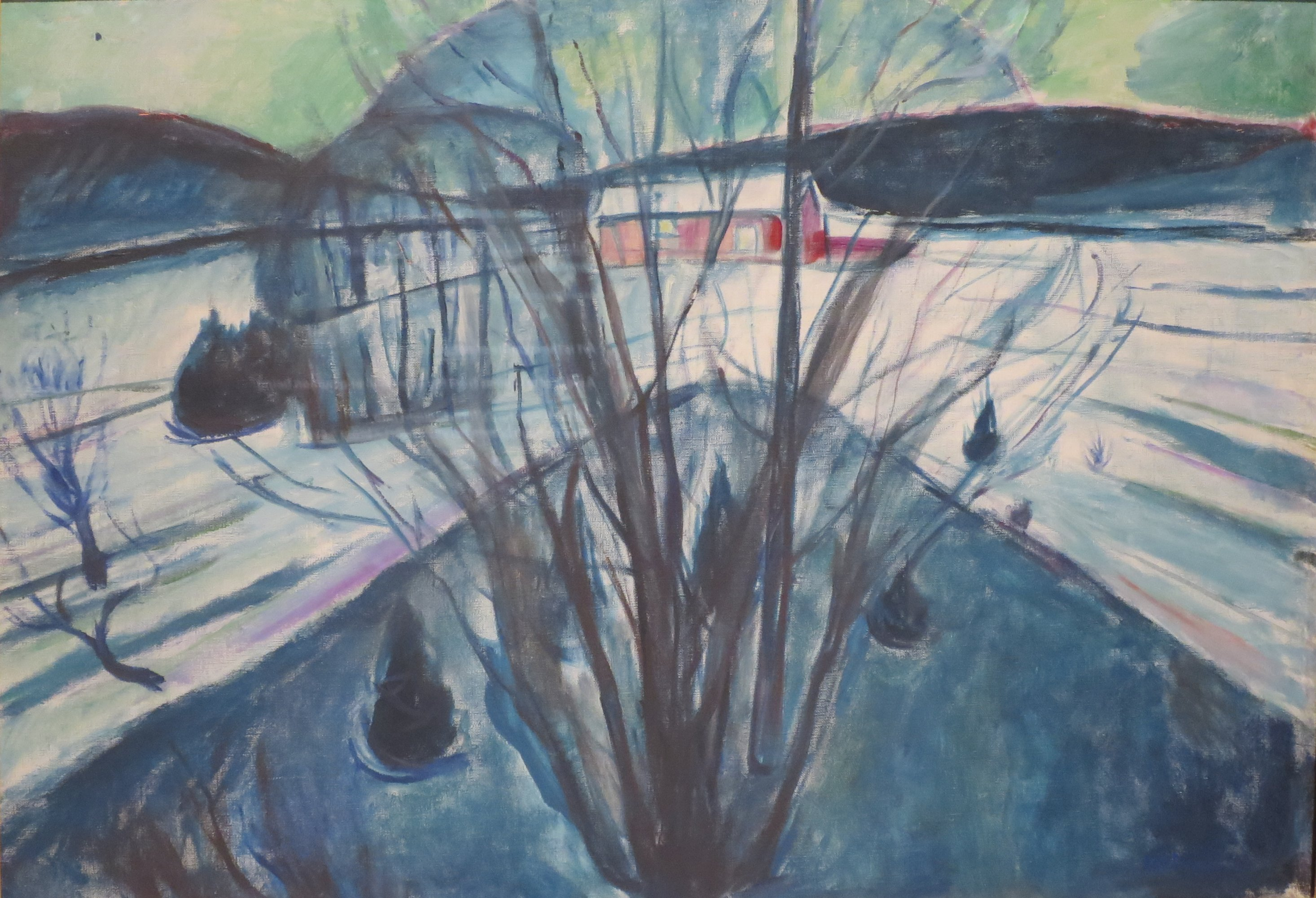
Winter Night, Ekely, 1930–1931, oil on canvas

=== Photographs ===
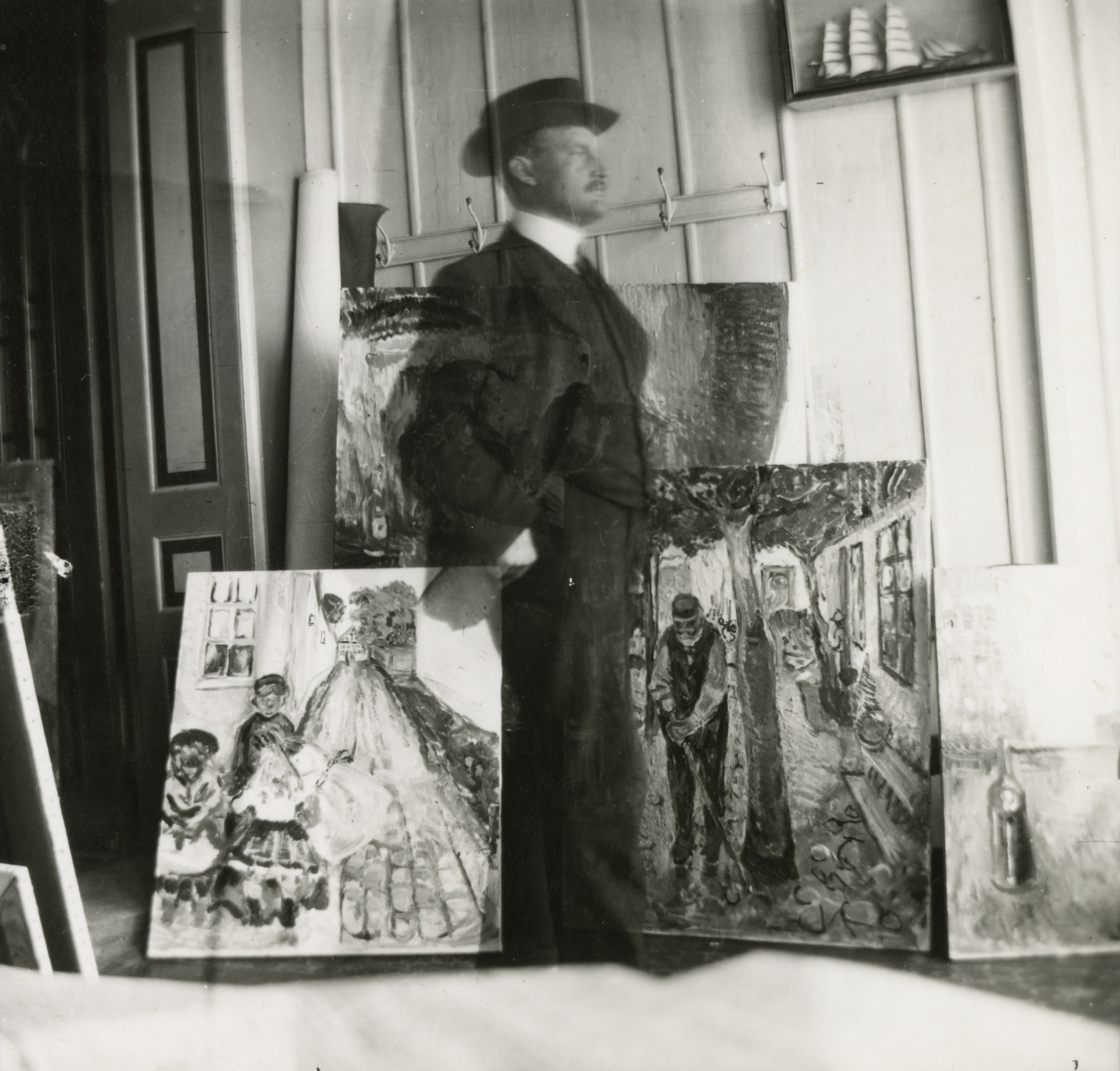
Self-Portrait at 53 Am Strom in Warnemünde, 1907, Munch Museum, Oslo

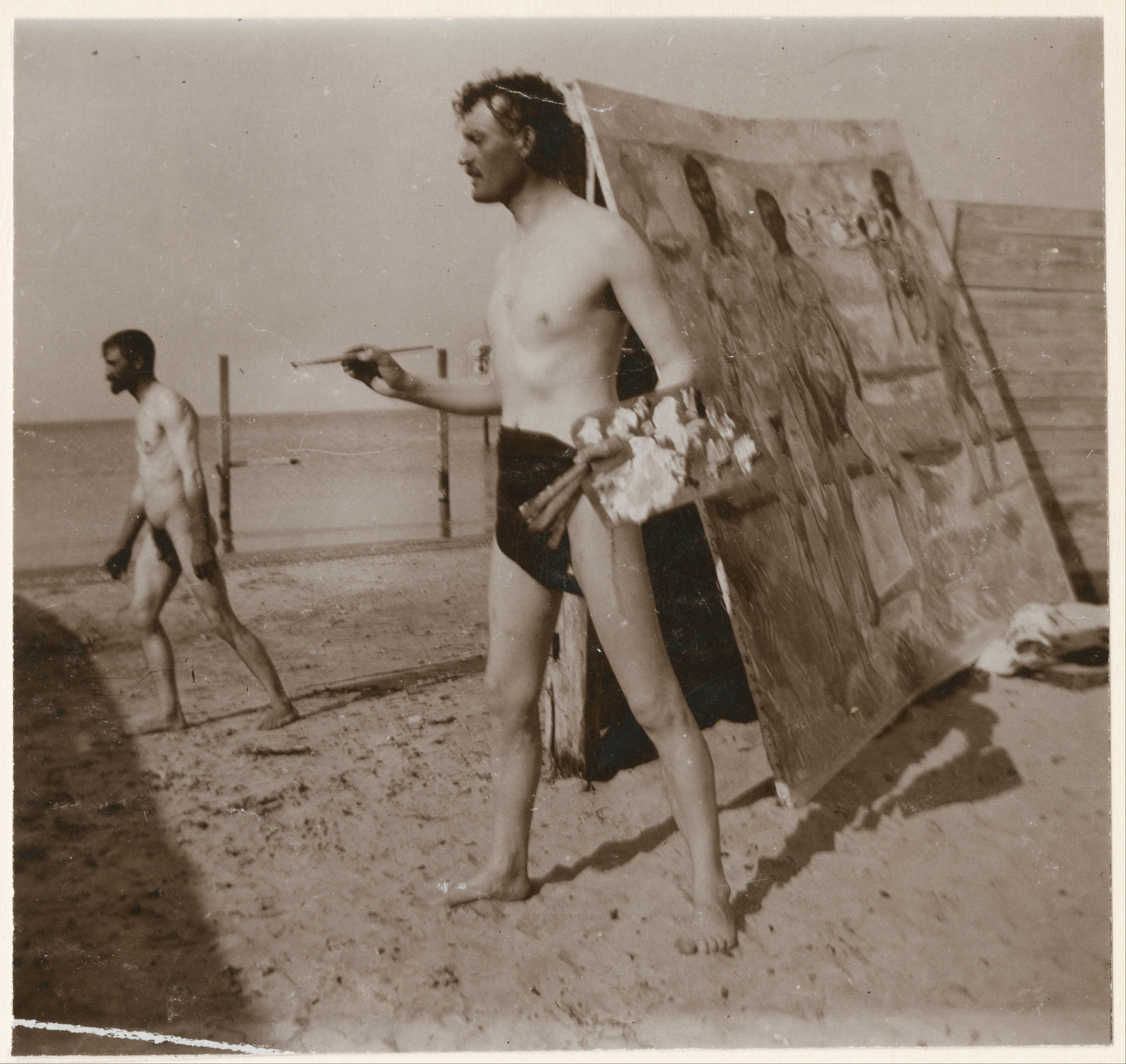
Edvard Munch at the Beach in Warnemünde, 1907, Munch Museum, Oslo. The painting he is working on is Bathing Men (1907-08)

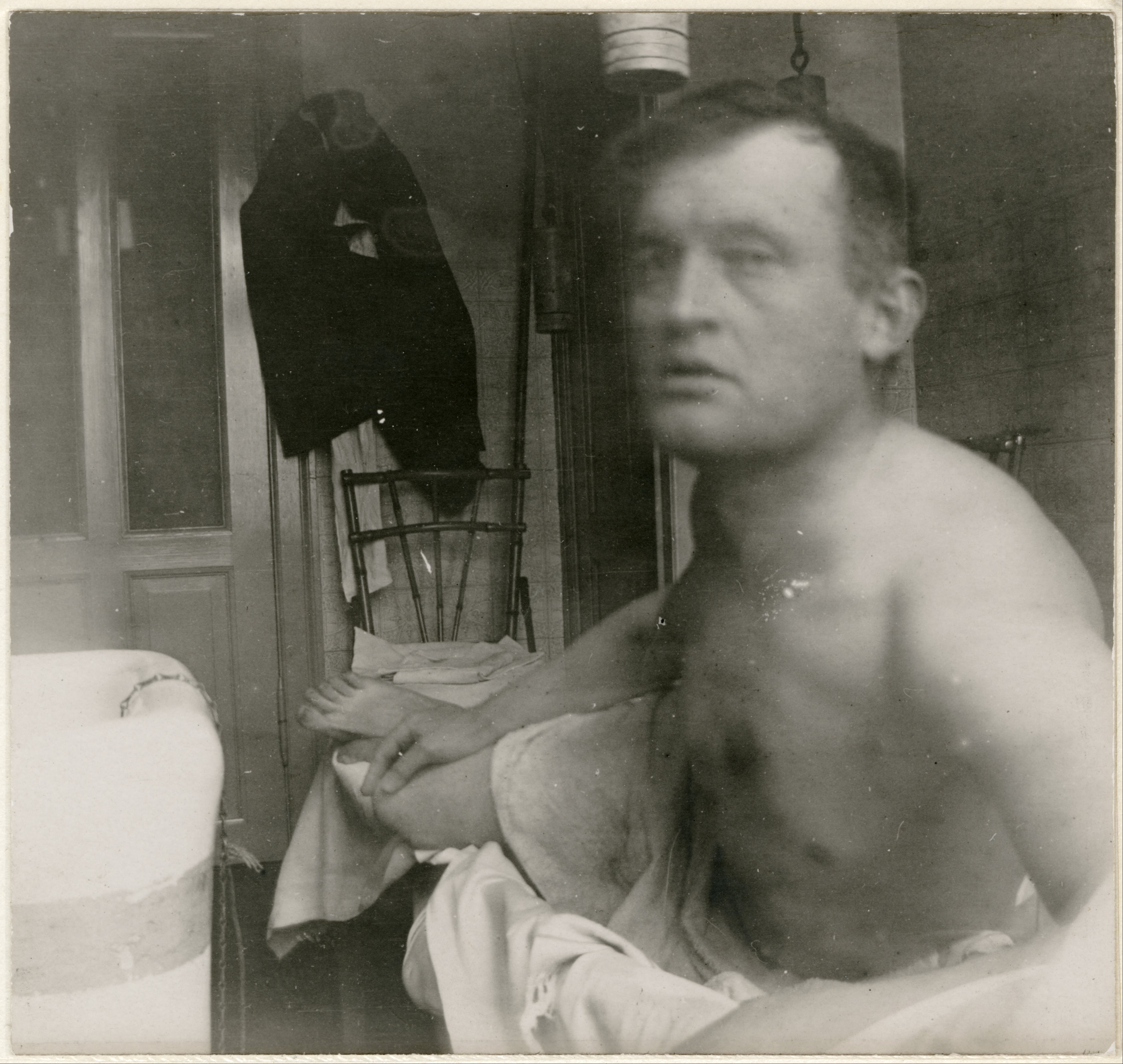
Self-Portrait "à la Marat", 1908–09, Munch Museum, Oslo

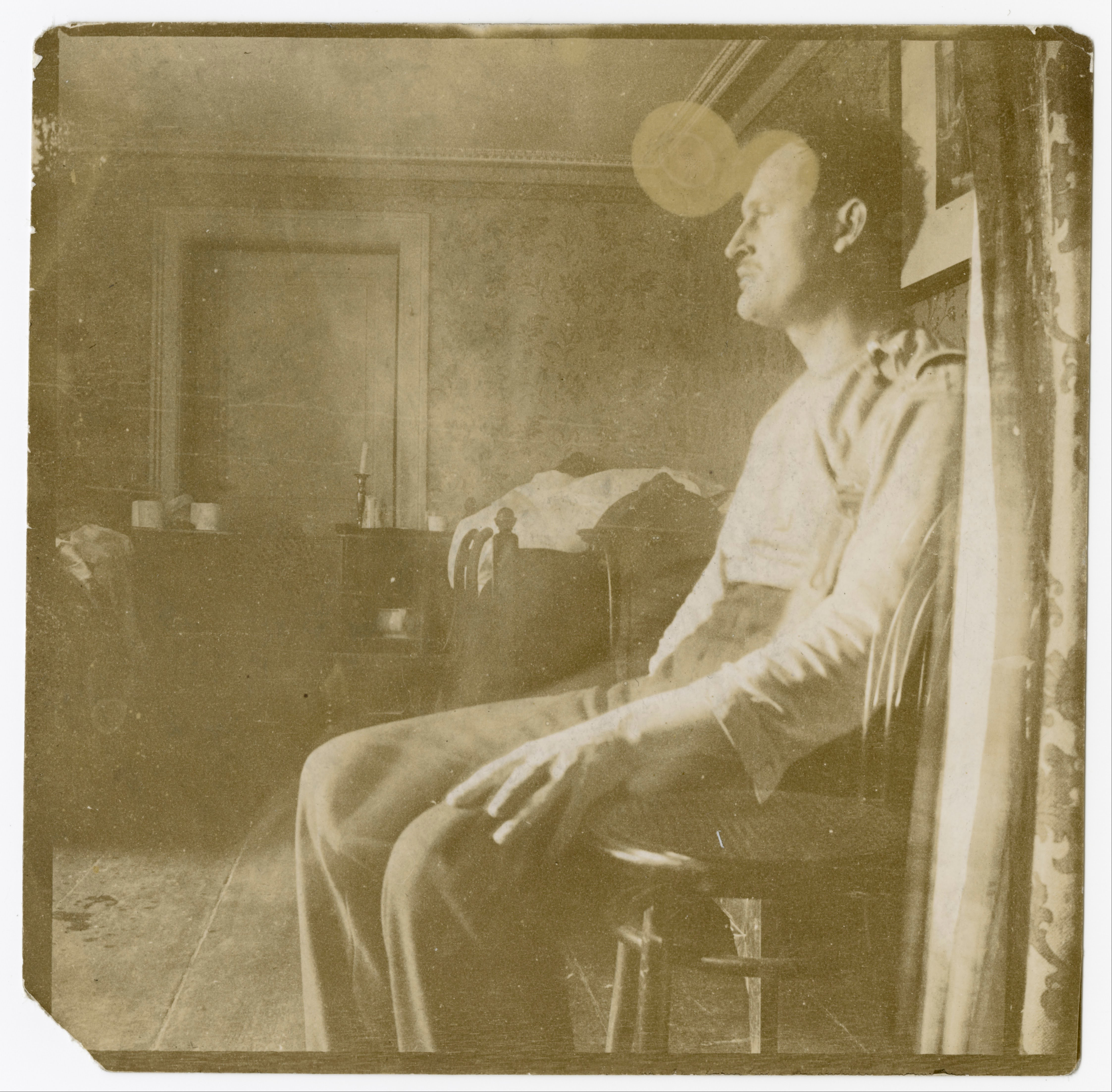
Self-Portrait Somewhere on the Continent I, 1906, Munch Museum, Oslo

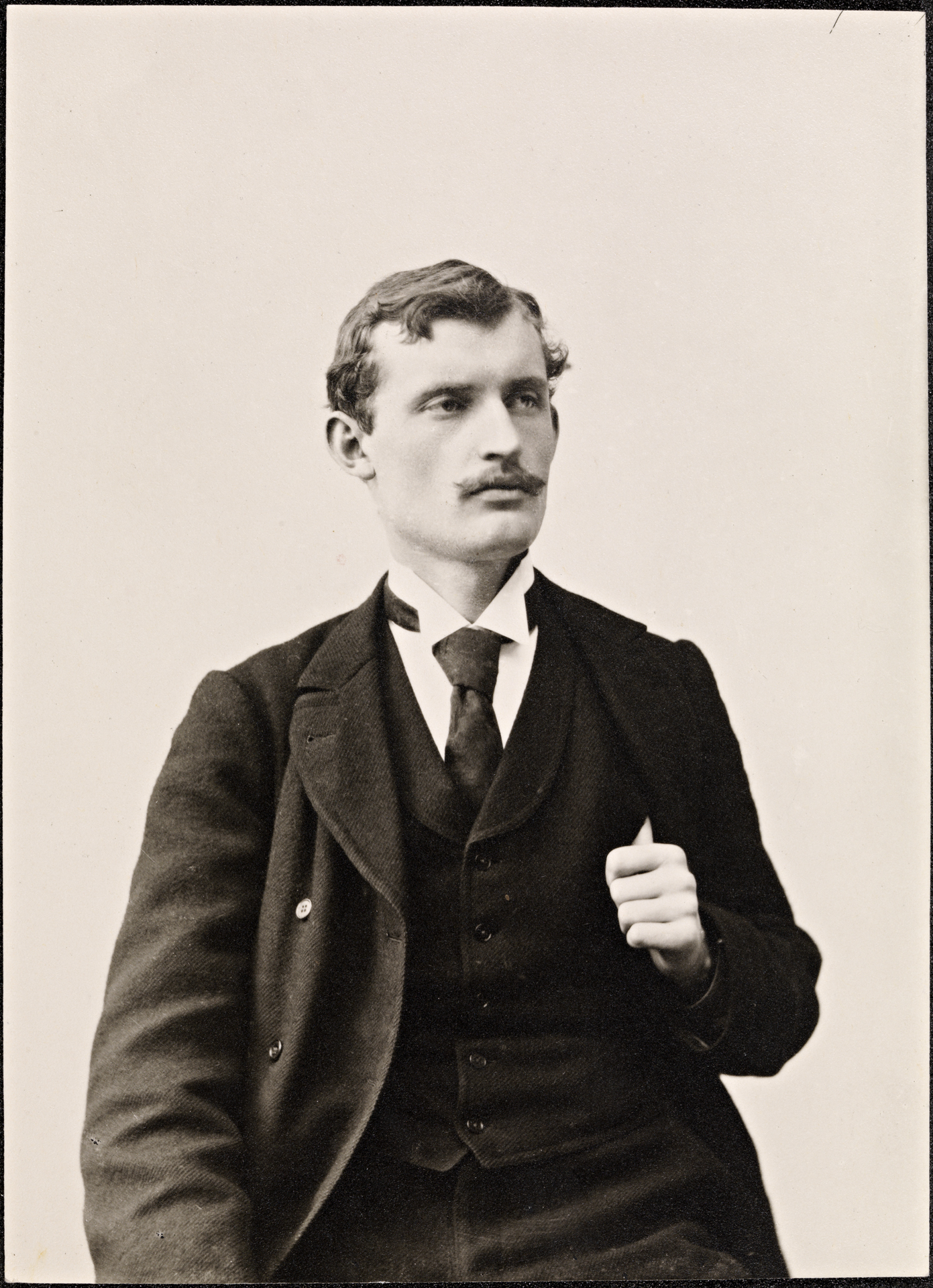
Portrait at 26 years

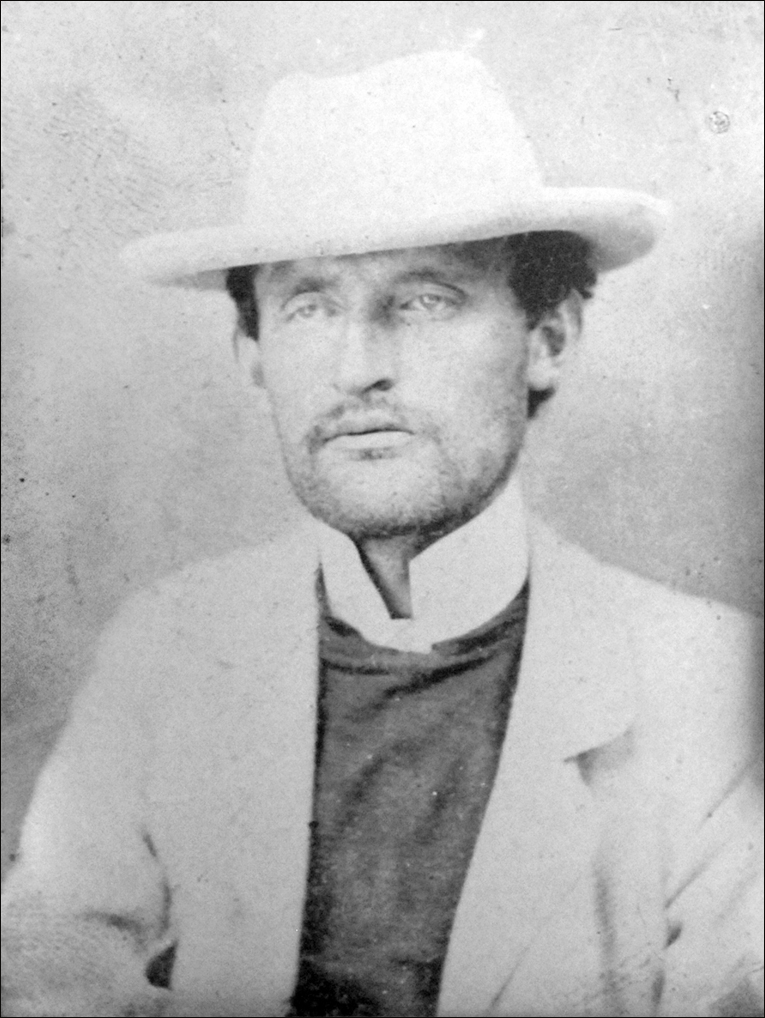
Portrait of Edvard Munch 1902

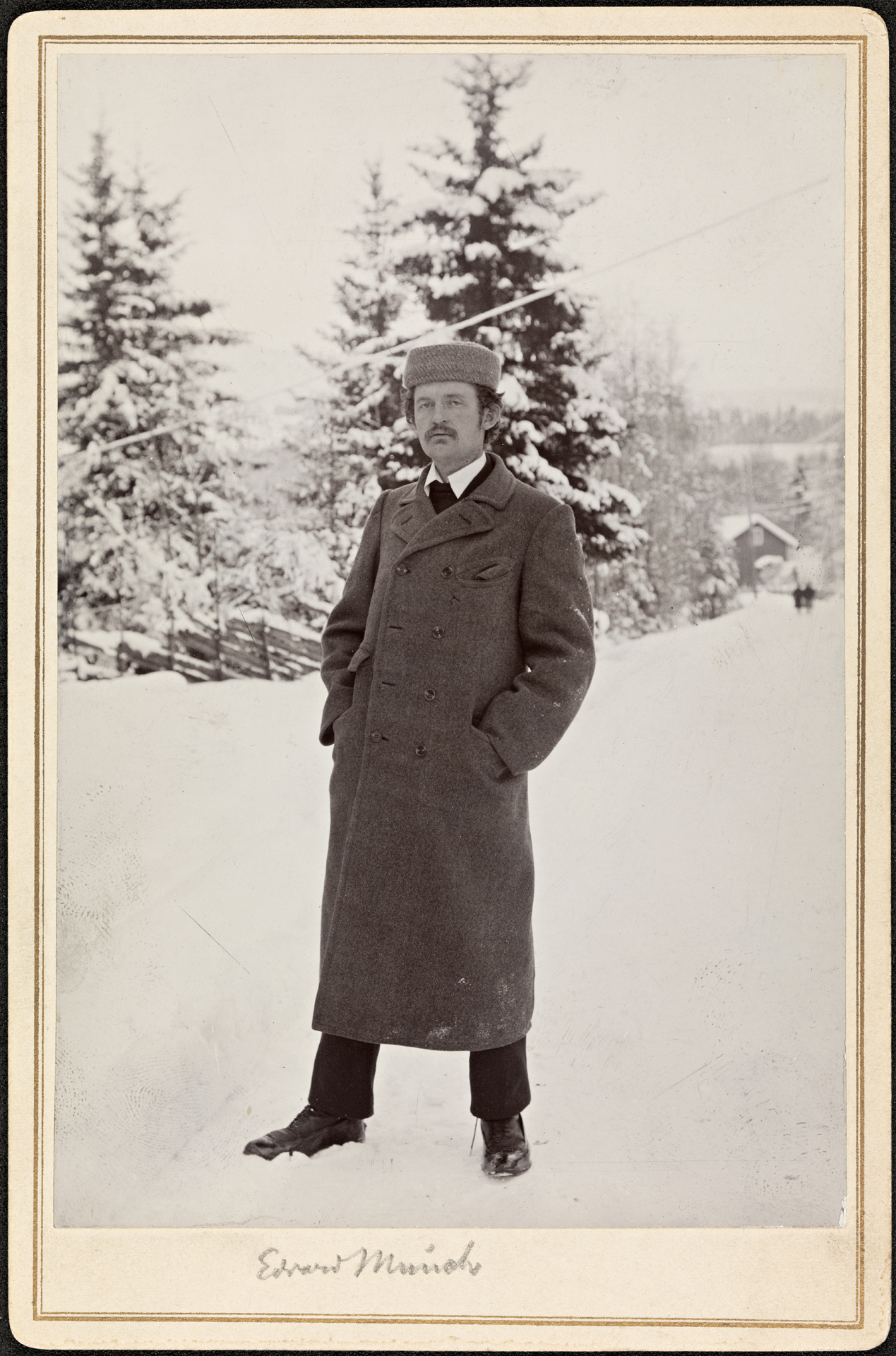
Portrait of Edvard Munch

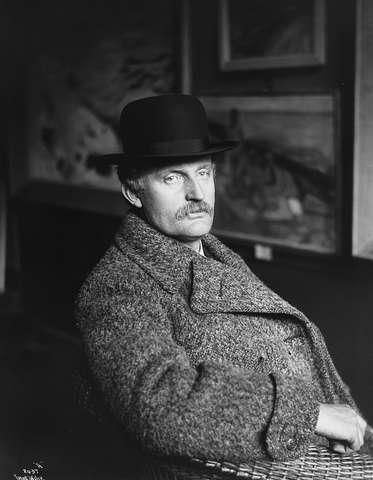
Munch in 1912

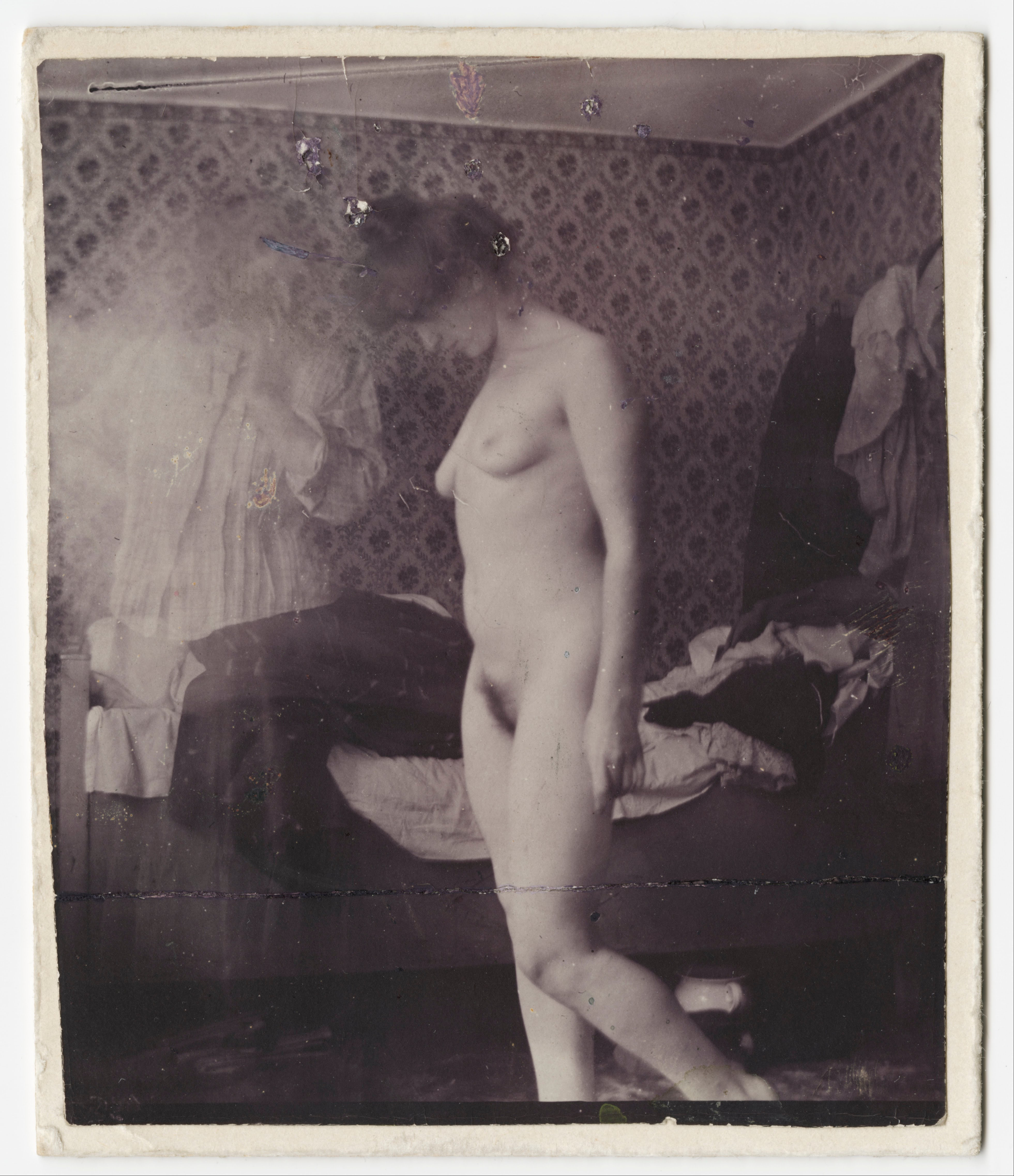
Rosa Meissner at the Hotel Rohn in Warnemünde, 1907, photograph, Munch Museum, Oslo

== See also ==
- List of paintings by Edvard Munch
- Edvard Munch, a 1974 biographical film
- List of claims for restitution for Nazi-looted art
