= Kazimir Malevich =

Russian artist and painter (1879–1935)

- Казимир Малевич
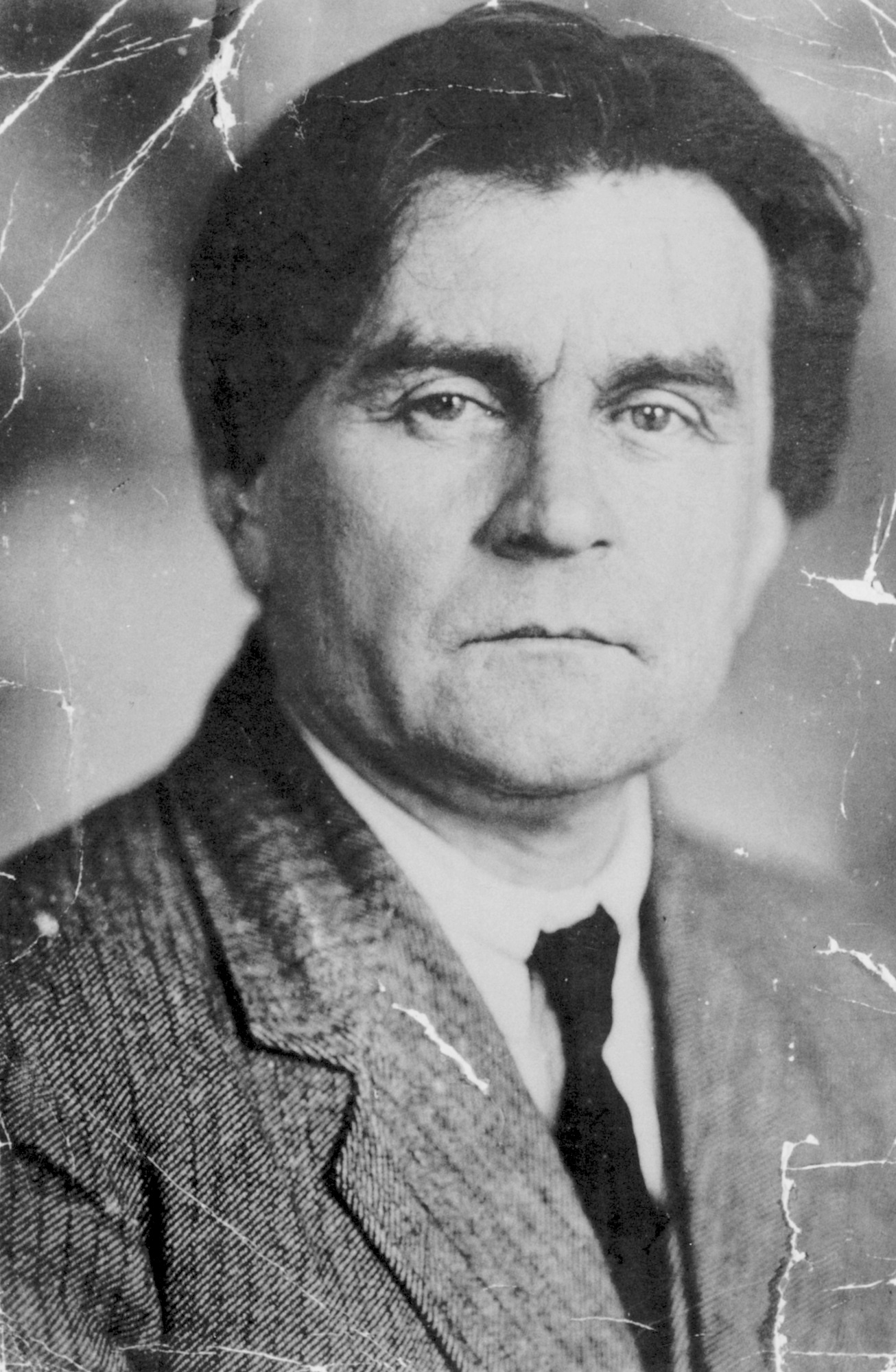
- Malevich in c. 1925
- Born: 23 February 1879; Kiev, Russian Empire (now Kyiv, Ukraine)
- Died: 15 May 1935 (aged 56); Leningrad, Russian SFSR, Soviet Union (now Saint Petersburg, Russia)
- Notable work: An Englishman in Moscow, 1914; Black Square, 1915; White on White, 1918
- Movement: Suprematism

Kazimir Severinovich Malevich (Note: Polish: Kazimierz Malewicz; Russian: Казимир Северинович Малевич [kəzʲɪˈmʲir sʲɪvʲɪˈrʲinəvʲɪtɕ mɐˈlʲevʲɪtɕ]; Ukrainian: Казимир Северинович Малевич, romanized: Kazymyr Severynovych Malevych [kɐzɪˈmɪr seweˈrɪnowɪtʃ mɐˈlɛwɪtʃ].) (23 February [O.S. 11 February] 1879 – 15 May 1935) was a Russian avant-garde artist and art theorist, (Note: Malevich's nationality has been a matter of scholarly dispute. He lived and work in the Russian Empire and became a foremost representative of the Russian avant-garde. However, Malevich self-identification was contextual and shifting; throughout his career, he variously described or referred to himself as Ukrainian and Polish. For further information on recent debates regarding the artist's nationality, particularly in the aftermath of the 2022 Russian invasion of Ukraine, see the Nationality and ethnicity section.) whose work and writings pioneered the development of abstract painting in the 20th century. He is best known as the founder of Suprematism, a radically non-objective form of painting he introduced in 1915.

Born in Kiev, modern-day Ukraine, to an ethnic Polish family, Malevich worked primarily in Russia and became a leading figure of the Russian avant-garde. His work has also been associated with the Ukrainian avant-garde. Early in his career, he worked in multiple styles, assimilating Impressionism, Symbolism, Fauvism, and Cubism through reproductions and the works acquired by contemporary Russian collectors. In the early 1910s, he exhibited alongside other Russian avant-garde artists, including Mikhail Larionov and Natalia Goncharova. In 1915, working in a Cubo-Futurist mode, Malevich developed Suprematism, a system of pure geometric abstraction on monochromatic grounds. His Black Square (1915), first shown at the Last Futurist Exhibition 0,10 in Petrograd, marked a decisive break with representational painting. He set out his theory in the brochure From Cubism and Futurism to Suprematism, published to accompany the exhibition.

His trajectory mirrored the upheavals around the October Revolution of 1917. In 1918, Malevich began teaching in Vitebsk along with Marc Chagall. In 1919, he founded the UNOVIS artists collective and had a solo show at the Sixteenth State Exhibition in Moscow. His reputation spread westward with solo exhibitions in Warsaw and Berlin in 1927, the only time he ever left Russia. (Note: Some sources mention Malevich's alleged trip to Paris in 1912, although that claim is not corroborated by documentary evidence. While Malevich is said to have made plans to travel abroad, including Paris, multiple times, the only documented travel outside of Russia (or the Soviet Union) was his 1927 trip to Poland and Germany. Sources: Rosamund Bartlett, "Malevich blazed a path into the future," The Telegraph, 12 July 2014, (https://www.telegraph.co.uk/culture/art/10957847/Malevich-blazed-a-path-into-the-future.html).; Charlotte Douglas, Preface, p. i in Rethinking Malevich: Proceedings of a Conference in Celebration of the 125th Anniversary of Kazimir Malevich's Birth, Pindar Press, 2007.; Kazimir Malevich in the Russian Museum, Gosudarstvennyĭ russkiĭ muzeĭ, eds. Evgeniia Andreevna Petrova, Elena V. Basner, Kazimir S. Malevich, Irina Arskaia, St. Petersburg: State Russian Museum, 2000, p. 20.; Marie Gasper-Hulvat, "State-Sanctioned Trips of Soviet Artists to the West in the Late 1920s: The Unusual Case of Kazimir Malevich," The Space Between: Literature and Culture 1914–1945, Volume 15, General Issue, 2019.; Erik Kruskopf, Shaping the Invisible: A Study of the Genesis of Non-representational Painting, 1908–1919, Vol. 55, Helsinki: Societas Scientiarum Fennica, 1976, p. 132.; David W. Galenson, Conceptual Revolutions in Twentieth-Century Art, Cambridge: Cambridge University Press, 2009, p. 292.) From 1928 to 1930 he taught at the Kiev Art Institute alongside Alexander Bogomazov, Victor Palmov, and Vladimir Tatlin, while publishing in the Kharkiv magazine Nova Generatsiia. In 1930, he was briefly arrested and interrogated by the OGPU in Leningrad. By the early 1930s, Stalin's restrictive cultural policy and the subsequent imposition of Socialist Realism had prompted Malevich to return to figuration and to paint in a representational style. Diagnosed with cancer in 1933, he was not allowed to leave the Soviet Union to seek treatment abroad. While constrained by his progressing illness and Stalin's cultural policies, Malevich painted and exhibited his work until the end of his life. He died on 15 May 1935, at age 56.

His art and his writings influenced Eastern and Central European contemporaries such as El Lissitzky, Lyubov Popova, Alexander Rodchenko and Henryk Stażewski, as well as generations of later abstract artists, such as Ad Reinhardt and the Minimalists. He was celebrated posthumously in major exhibits at the Museum of Modern Art (1936), the Guggenheim Museum (1973), and the Stedelijk Museum in Amsterdam (1989), which has a large collection of his work. In the 1990s, the ownership claims of museums to many Malevich works began to be disputed by his heirs.

== Early life (1879–1905) ==
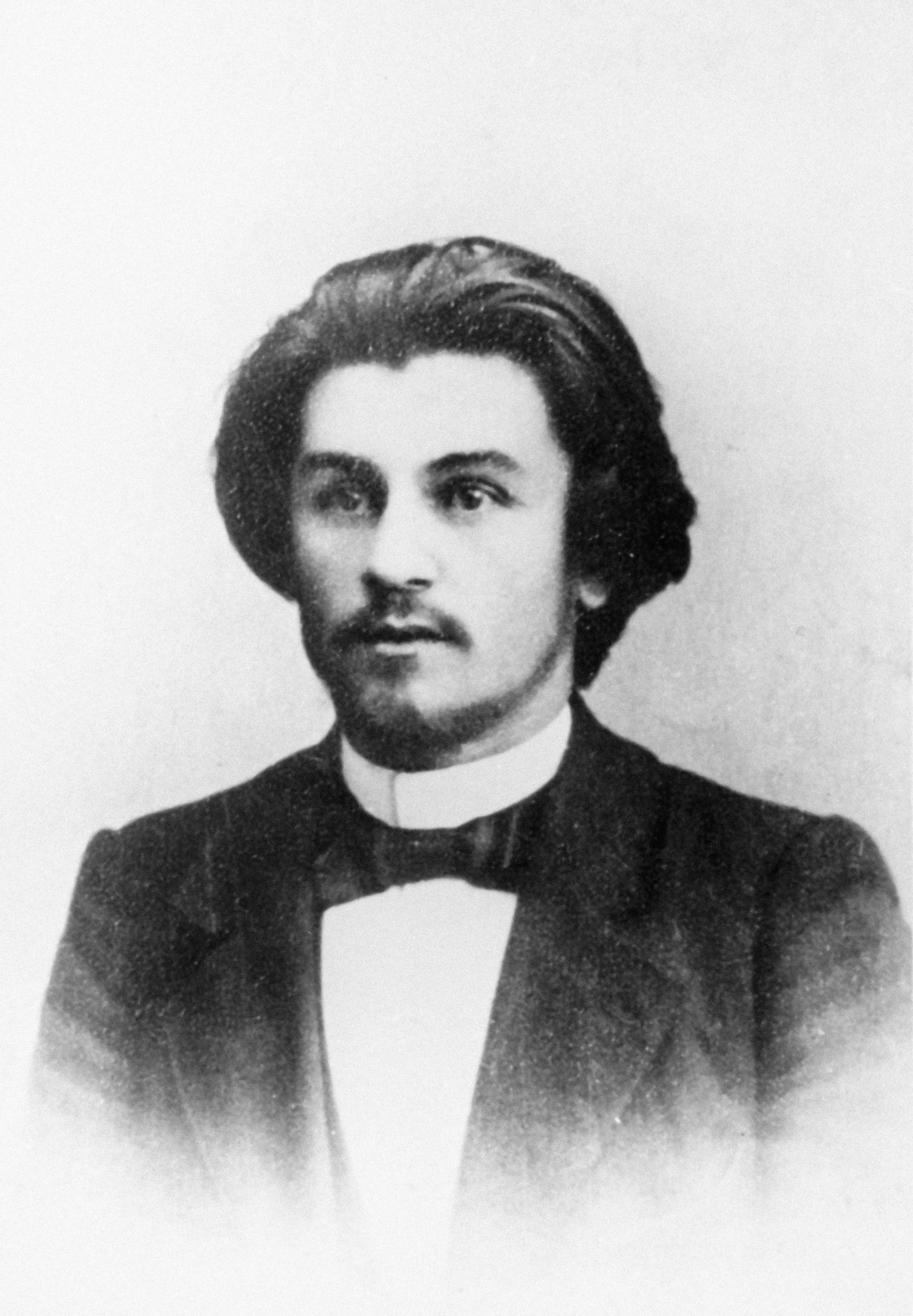
Kazimir Malevich (c.1900)

Kazimir Severinovich Malevich was born on either 23 (O.S. 11) February or 26 (O.S. 14) February 1879, to Severin (Seweryn) Antonovich and Liudviga (Ludwika) Alexandrovna. His parents, who were Polish, had fled Poland following the failed January Uprising of 1863 against Russian rule. Lucjan Malewicz, Kazimir's uncle, was a Catholic priest and one of the leaders of the 1863 insurrection. The family subsequently settled near Kiev (modern-day Kyiv, Ukraine) in Kiev Governorate of the Russian Empire. Kazimir was the first of fourteen children, only nine of whom survived into adulthood. His parents were Roman Catholic, though his father attended Orthodox services as well. The primary language spoken within Malevich's household was Polish, but he also spoke Russian, as well as Ukrainian due to his childhood surroundings.

Malevich's father worked as manager at several different sugar refineries. Between 1889 and 1896, Malevich's family relocated multiple times due to his father's job. In 1889, they moved to Parkhomovka near Kharkov (modern-day Ukraine). In Parkhomovka, Malevich attended a two-year agricultural school and taught himself to paint in a simple peasant style, drawing inspiration from rural surroundings. About four years later, the family relocated to Voltochok near Konotop, which was near centers of Polish cultural activity at the time. There, Malevich met the composer Nikolai Roslavets. He later briefly attended classes at the Kiev School of Drawing under the encouragement of the realist painter Mykola Pymonenko.

=== Kursk and Moscow (1896–1905) ===
In 1896, the family moved to Kursk (modern-day Russia), where Malevich encountered several Russian artists, such as Lev Kvachevsky, with whom he often worked outdoors. By Malevich's own admission, his dedication to painting would make him the "black sheep" of the family. Through reproductions, Malevich also became familiar with the work of the Peredvizhniki (Wanderers), including Ivan Shishkin and Ilia Repin, two leading Russian Realist painters. In 1896, he began working as a technical draughtsman at the Moscow-Kursk-Voronezh railway company.

Malevich would later describe 1898 as the year he began exhibiting his work, although there is no evidence for this claim. In 1899, he met his first wife, Kazimira Ivanovna Zgleits, who was eight years his senior. They had two children, Galina and Anatolii, the latter of whom dies of typhoid in his early childhood. His father died in 1902, at the age of fifty-seven, and in 1903, Malevich held an exhibition at the Society for the Support of Primary Education in Kursk.

Recognizing his style as increasingly more Impressionistic, Malevich intended to receive academic training in Moscow. By 1904, as more French art was being reproduced and discussed in Russia in the magazine Mir iskusstva, Malevich had also become acquainted with the work of Paul Gauguin. Malevich and other artists in Moscow gained an early exposure to Western modern art through the private collections of Sergei Shchukin and Ivan Morozov. Their acquisitions ranged from French Impressionism to paintings by Paul Cézanne and Gauguin, and were later expanded to include the works of the key Parisian avant-garde artists, such as Pablo Picasso and Henri Matisse.

Malevich is said to have visited both collections soon after his first arrival in Moscow in the fall of 1904. Similarities between his Apple Tree in Blossom (1904) and Alfred Sisley's Villeneuve-la-Garenne (1872), then in Shchukin's collection, have been cited as an early indication of the collectors’ influence on Malevich's oeuvre. In October 1904, Vladimir Lenin, the Bolshevik leader and political activist, returns to Russia from exile. At the time, anti-government sentiment in Russia was gaining momentum, intensifying after Bloody Sunday in St. Petersburg in January 1905, when Tsarist forces killed numerous protesters. On October 17, 1905, Nicholas II issued the October Manifesto, granting limited voting rights to the middle class. In November, the government suppressed further revolutionary activity through military force. In his autobiography, Malevich later claimed to have taken part in the Battle of the Barricades in Moscow in December 1905, an attempt to sustain the revolution against the Tsarist regime.

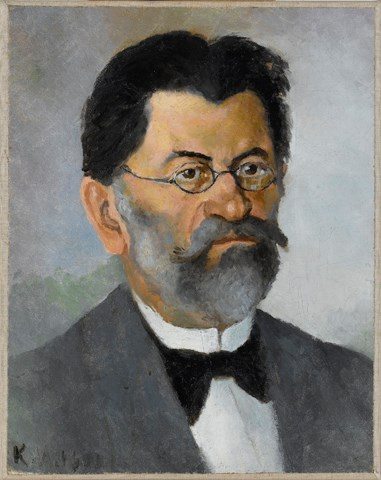
Portrait of the Artist's Father (1902–1903, Stedelijk Museum Amsterdam)

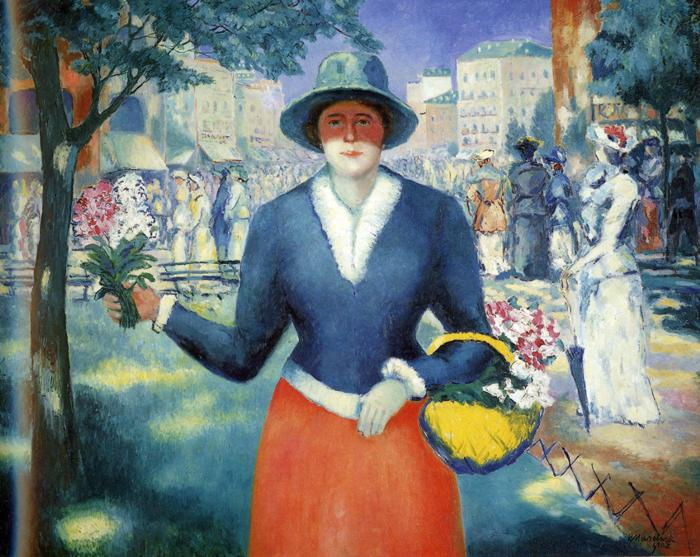
Flower Girl (1903, Russian Museum)

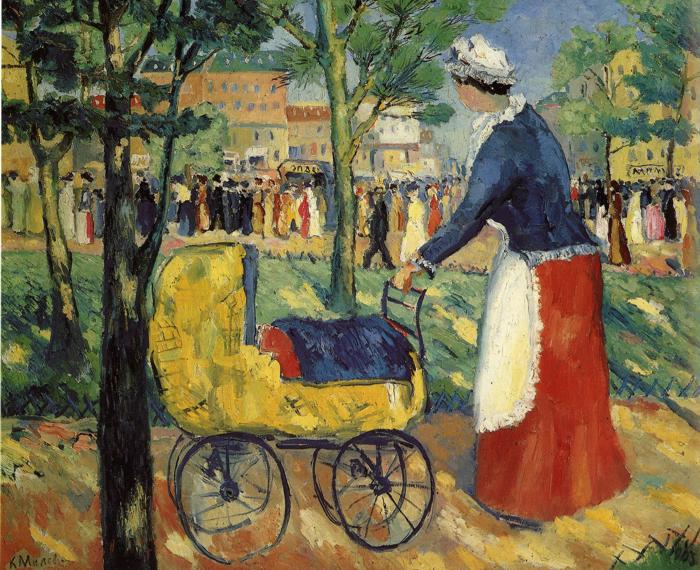
Boulevard (1904–05, Russian Museum)

== Moscow and the avant-garde (1906–1915) ==
=== Early years in Moscow (1906–1910) ===
Malevich settled in Moscow, along with his family and his mother, in the spring of 1906. There, Malevich attended the studio of Fedor Rerberg, who was known to prepare his students for applications to the Moscow School of Painting, Sculpture and Architecture. Despite Malevich's multiple attempts to apply to the Moscow art school, however, he was never offered admission. In 1907, the Blue Rose Exhibition of a group of Moscow Symbolist painters—part of a broader early 20th-century movement that rejected naturalism in favor of mystical themes and dreamlike imagery—left a deep impression on the artist. (Note: Malevich submitted a single painting to the exhibition; it was rejected.) The impact of Symbolism on Malevich during that period is evident in paintings such as The Triumph of Heaven (1907) and The Shroud of Christ (1908).

By 1908, he developed a strong interest in Russian icons and Russian folk art. At the same time, more Western avant-garde influences reached Moscow, including through the activities of the Golden Fleece group, who in 1908 organized a major exhibition of Russian and Western European art that included works by Vincent van Gogh, Matisse, Georges Braque, Gauguin, and Cézanne. In 1909, the group also published in their journal a Russian translation of Matisse's treatise Notes on Painting (1908) and Shchukin opened his collection to the public. In September 1909, Malevich's planned visit to Paris was cancelled when a sale of his painting fell through. Later that year, he met his future second wife Sofia Mikhailovna Rafalovich.

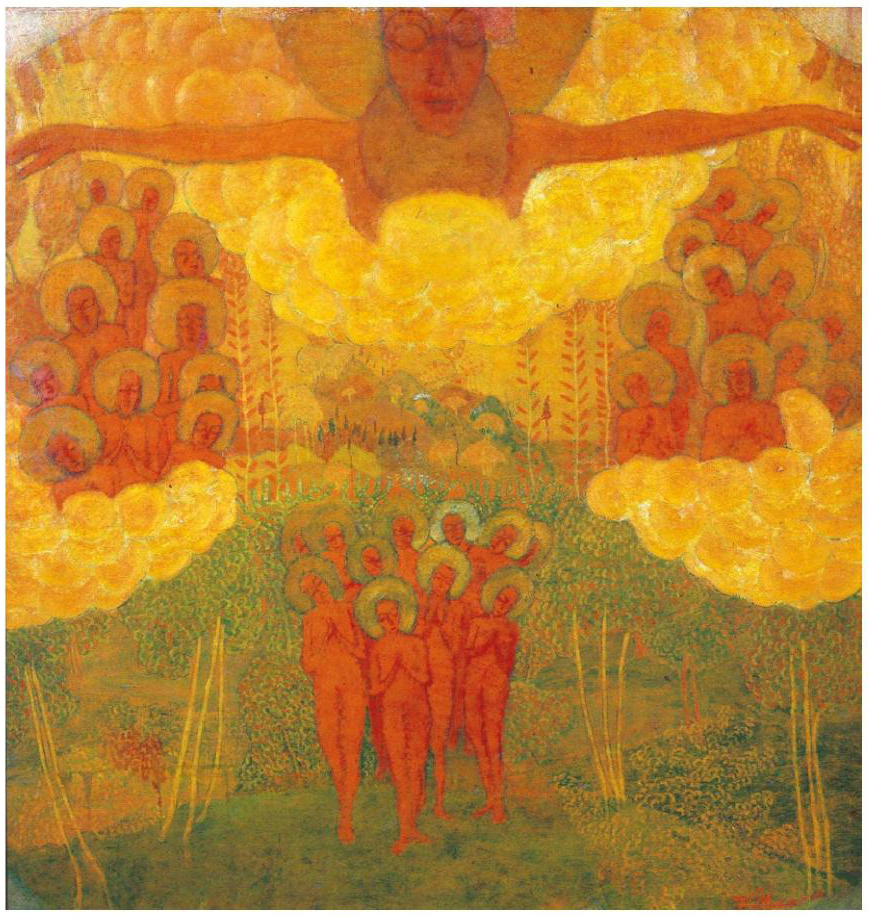
Triumph of Heaven (1907, Russian Museum), an example of Malevich's early Symbolism-inspired work

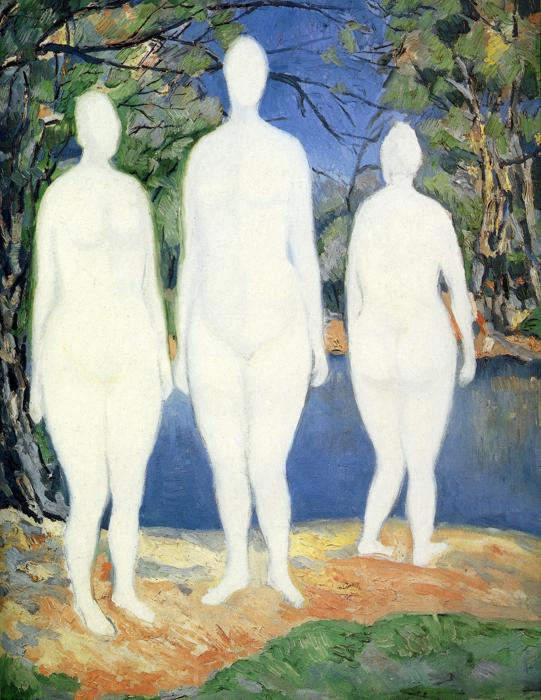
Bathers (1908, Russian Museum)

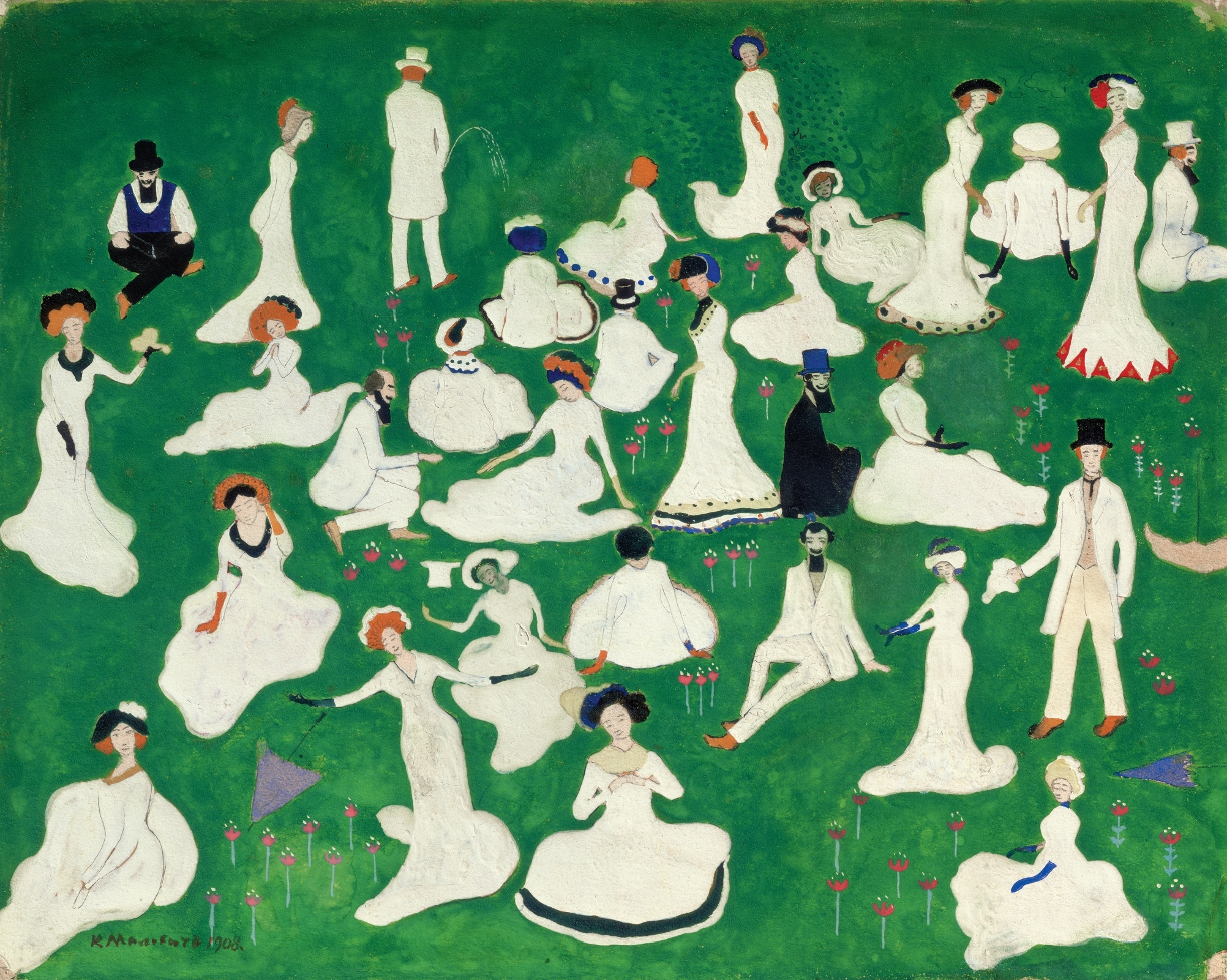
Rest. Society in Top Hats (1908, Russian Museum)

=== Knave of Diamonds and Donkey's Tail (1910–1912) ===
In December 1910, Malevich took part in the first of a series of exhibitions of an artistic collective Knave of Diamonds. According to Malevich the name "Knave" (or "Jack") "stood for youth" and "diamonds" for "beautiful youth". The group was founded by Natalia Goncharova and Mikhail Larionov, leading figures of the Moscow avant-garde, who sought to combine the modernist Western vocabularies of artists like Cézanne with the traditions of Russian folk art. Years later, in 1924, Malevich claimed that the Knave of Diamonds exhibition "shook severely the aesthetic foundations and consequently the foundation of art in society and criticism". During that time, Malevich took on some commercial projects as a way to support himself financially. In 1911, he worked with the company Brocard & Co., designing a bottle for their eau de cologne called Severny, which was used by the company through the mid-1920s. The base of the bottle consisted of a jagged form resembling an iceberg and the stopper featured a small figurine of a polar bear.

Also in 1911, Malevich participated in the second exhibition of the avant-garde group Soyuz Molodyozhi (Union of Youth) in St. Petersburg, where he showed some of his Cubist-inspired paintings. Other artists included Goncharova, Larionov, Vladimir Tatlin, and David Burliuk. That year, Goncharova and Larionov—both of whom had a strong influence on Malevich during that period—broke away from the Knave of Diamonds to establish the Donkey's Tail collective. Intending to focus more on Russian subject matter, they embraced a deliberately "primitive" approach, favoring flattened forms and simplified visual structures. Unlike their Western European counterparts—such as Picasso, whose turn to the "primitive" appropriated non-Western imagery mediated through French colonial conquests—the Moscow Neo-Primitivists drew on domestic sources, especially Russian peasant culture and folk imagery like the lubok. Art historians have since noted that even as Russian artists sought to ground their work in local traditions, they continued to rely heavily on the formal vocabularies of the Western avant-garde. In March 1912, Malevich took part in Donkey's Tail exhibition in Moscow that ran through April, which included his recent works, such as the figurative and peasant-inspired gouache paintings titled Floor Polishers (1911–12) and Washerwoman (1911).

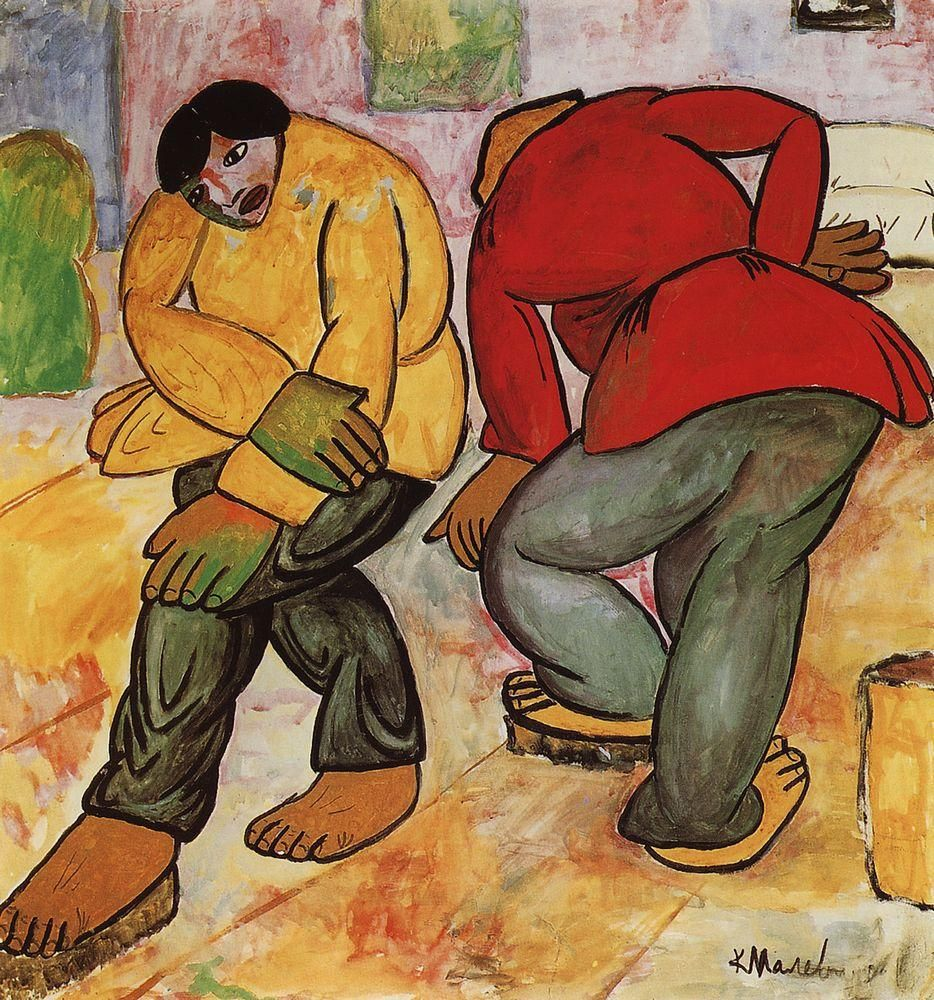
Floorpolishers (1911–1912, Stedelijk Museum) exhibited at the Donkey's Tail in Moscow in 1912

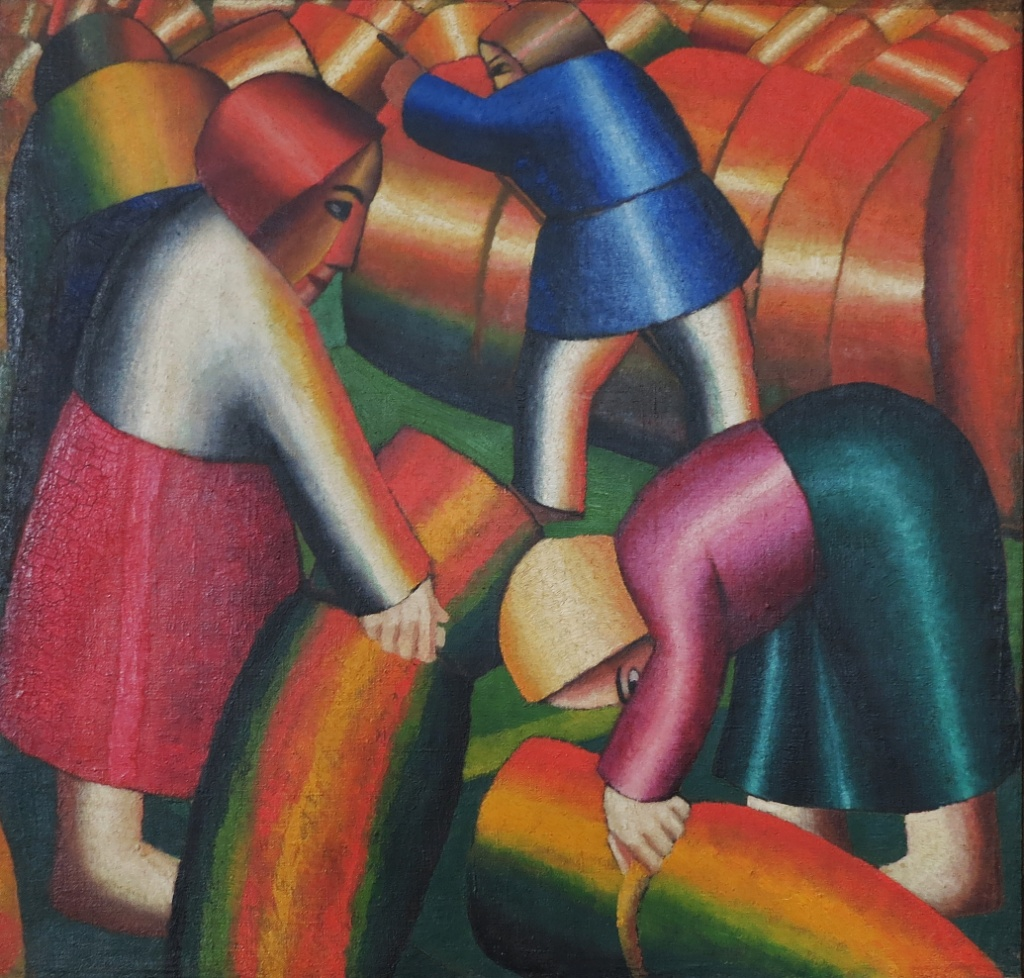
Taking in the Rye (1911, Stedelijk Museum)

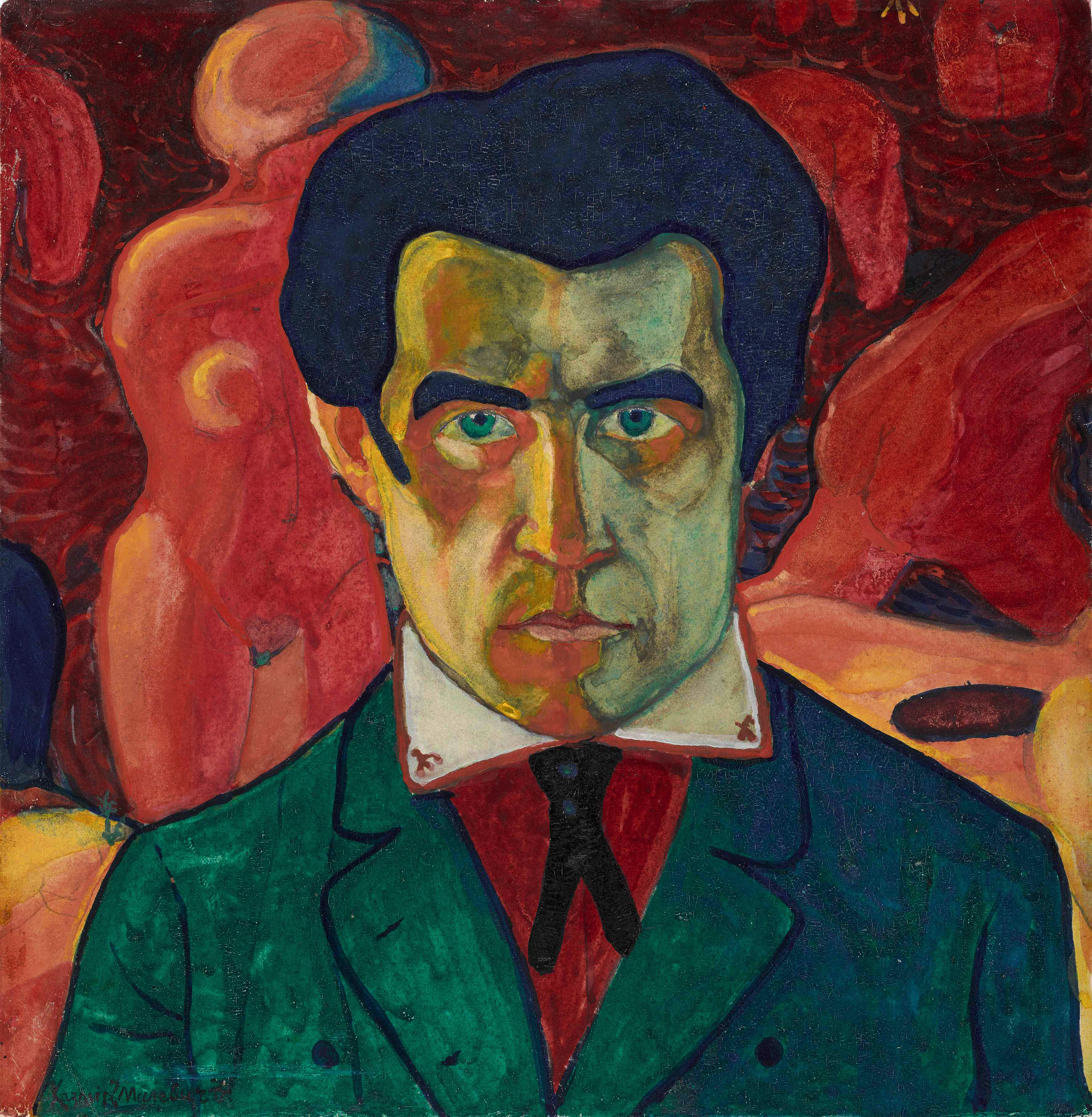
Self-portrait (1912, Tretyakov Gallery)

=== Target Exhibition and Cubo-Futurism (1913) ===
By 1913, the influence of Italian Futurism on Russian contemporary art had become more pronounced. Excerpts of the Manifesto of Futurism, written by Filippo Tommaso Marinetti, were already published in Russia in 1909. Its call to reject the past, glorify modernity, and embrace speed, dynamism, and aggressive provocation resonated with the Russian avant-garde. Adapting some of the futurist rhetoric, artists like Burliuk and Malevich shifted Marinetti's celebration of machines and violence more toward linguistic experimentation and cognitive transformation. Among such experiments was a technique called zaum, or “transrational” language, wherein Russian Futurist technique used invented sounds and words to bypass reason and evoke a higher reality. In a letter sent to his friend, composer Mikhail Matyushin, in the spring of 1913, Malevich wrote:

We have come to reject reason, but we have rejected reason because a different kind of reason has arisen within us, one which might be called transrational [zaum] if compared with the one which we have rejected; it also has its own law, construction and meaning, and only when we have cognized it will our works be founded on the truly new law of transrationalism.

— Kazimir Malevich's letter to Mikhail Matyushin, spring 1913

Around that time, Burliuk led a Russian futurist parade in Moscow, where artists with painted faces recited futurist poetry. In March 1913, Malevich participated in the Target exhibition in Moscow together with Goncharova and Larionov, continuing to reinterpret Futurist vocabularies to "suggest movement by breaking cone shapes into almost unrecognizable forms". Malevich described himself in this period as working in a “Cubo-Futurist” style. Among other paintings, Malevich exhibited Morning in the Country after Snowstorm and Knifegrinder or Principle of Glittering, both made in 1912, at Target for the first time. That same year, the Cubo-Futurist opera, Victory Over the Sun, debuted in at Luna Park Theater in St. Petersburg. The opera featured a libretto by Aleksei Kruchenykh written in zaum, dissonant music by Matyushin, and stage and costume designs by Malevich. Its allegorical plot depicts the Sun—symbolizing the old order—being captured and buried, reflecting the Futurist celebration of technological progress and the rejection of past traditions. For one scene Malevich designed a curtain with the outline of a square, which he later identified as the first appearance of his Black Square. Although the production was poorly received by contemporary audiences, it prefigured Malevich's subsequent development of abstract painting.

=== Paris Salon and Wartime Works (1914) ===
In March 1914, Malevich was invited by Nikolai Kubin to participate in the Salon des Indépendants in Paris. He sent several of his works to be shown at the Salon, including Samovar from 1913, a Cubist depiction of a traditional Eastern European metal container used to heat and boil water. Malevich also co-illustrated, with Pavel Filonov, Selected Poems with Postscript, 1907–1914 by Velimir Khlebnikov and another work by Khlebnikov in 1914 titled Roar! Gauntlets, 1908–1914, with Vladimir Burliuk. On June 28, 1914, Archduke Franz Ferdinand was assassinated in Sarajevo, precipitating the outbreak of the Great War (later known as World War I). Sometime in the fall or winter of 1914, Malevich made Reservist of the First Division, a Cubo-Futurist work that incorporated collage, a post stamp with an image of Tsar Nicholas, printed text, and a thermometer affixed to the canvas, among other non-traditional compositional elements. Scattering multiple political, cultural, and military references across abstract geometric planes, the work has been interpreted by some as reflecting Malevich's own status as an army reservist. He also created a series of propagandistic chromolithographs in various formats in support of Russia's entry into the war. These prints were accompanied by captions by Vladimir Mayakovsky and published by the Moscow-based publication house Segodniashnii Lubok (Contemporary Lubok). While the prints drew on folk-art traditions of the lubok and emphasized bold blocks of pure color, the Reservist relied on Cubo-Futurist collage and abstraction; together, these works signaled formal strategies of flat planes and geometric ordering that further anticipated Malevich's turn to Suprematism the following year.

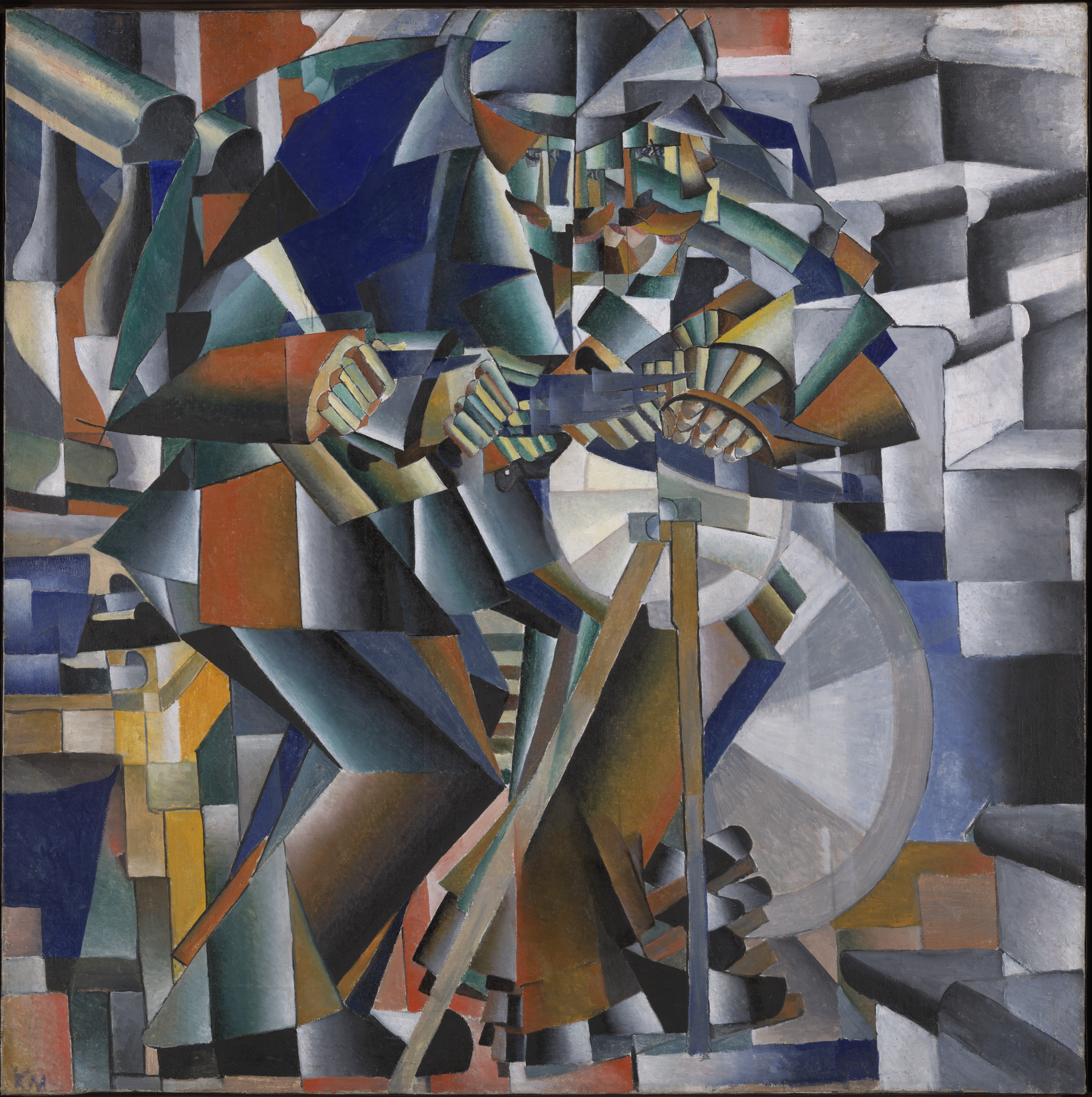
The Knifegrinder or Principle of Glittering (1912, Yale University Art Gallery) shown at the Target exhibition in Moscow in 1913

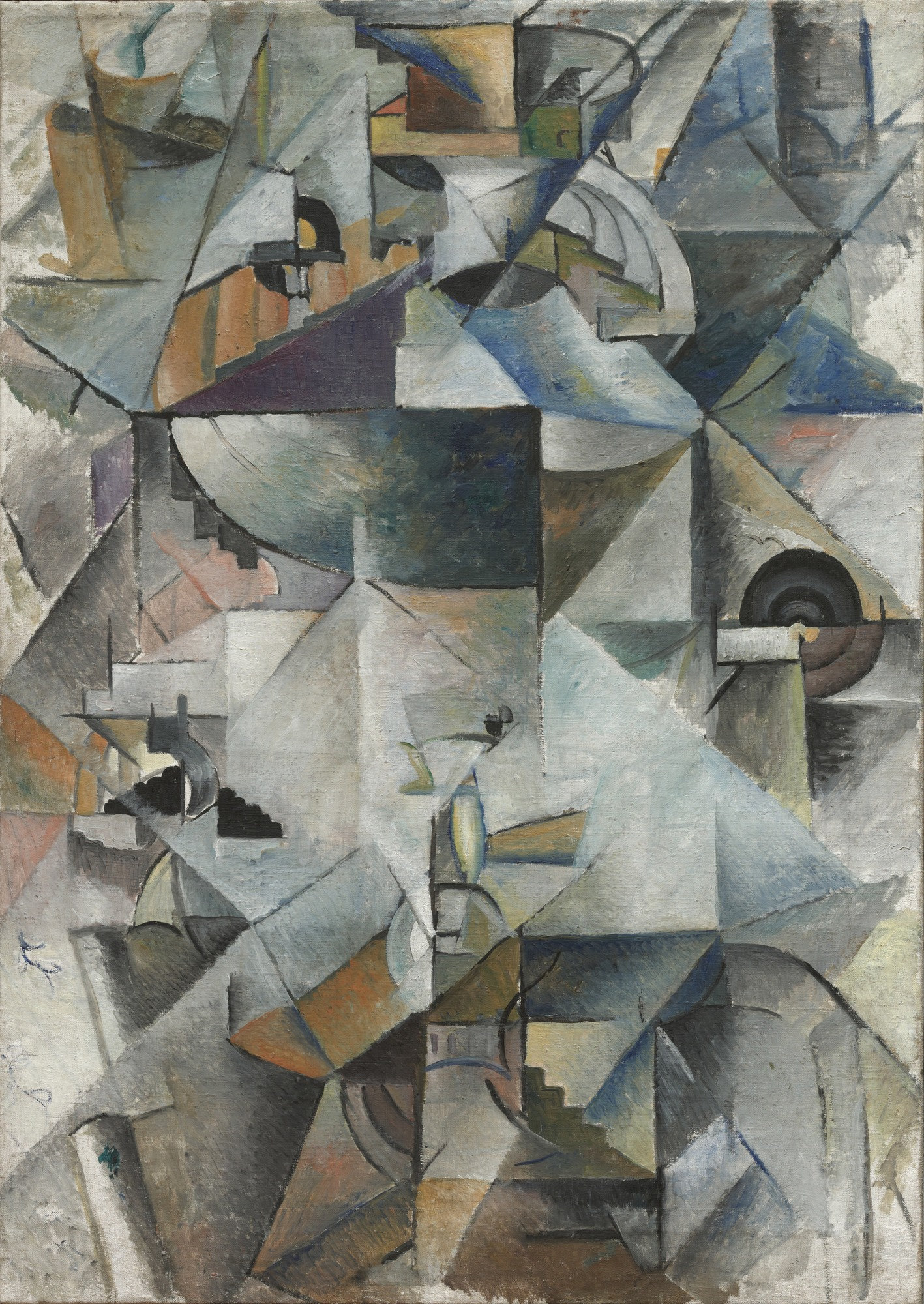
Samovar (1913, Museum of Modern Art), exhibited at the Salon des indépendants in 1914

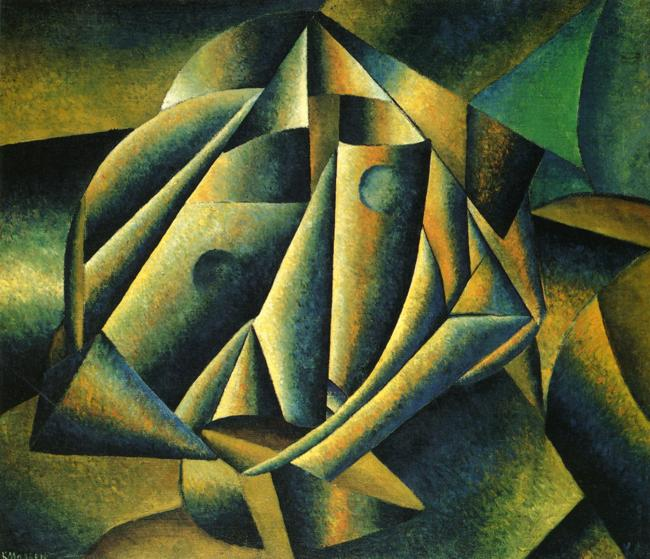
Head of a Peasant Girl (1912–1913, Stedelijk Museum)

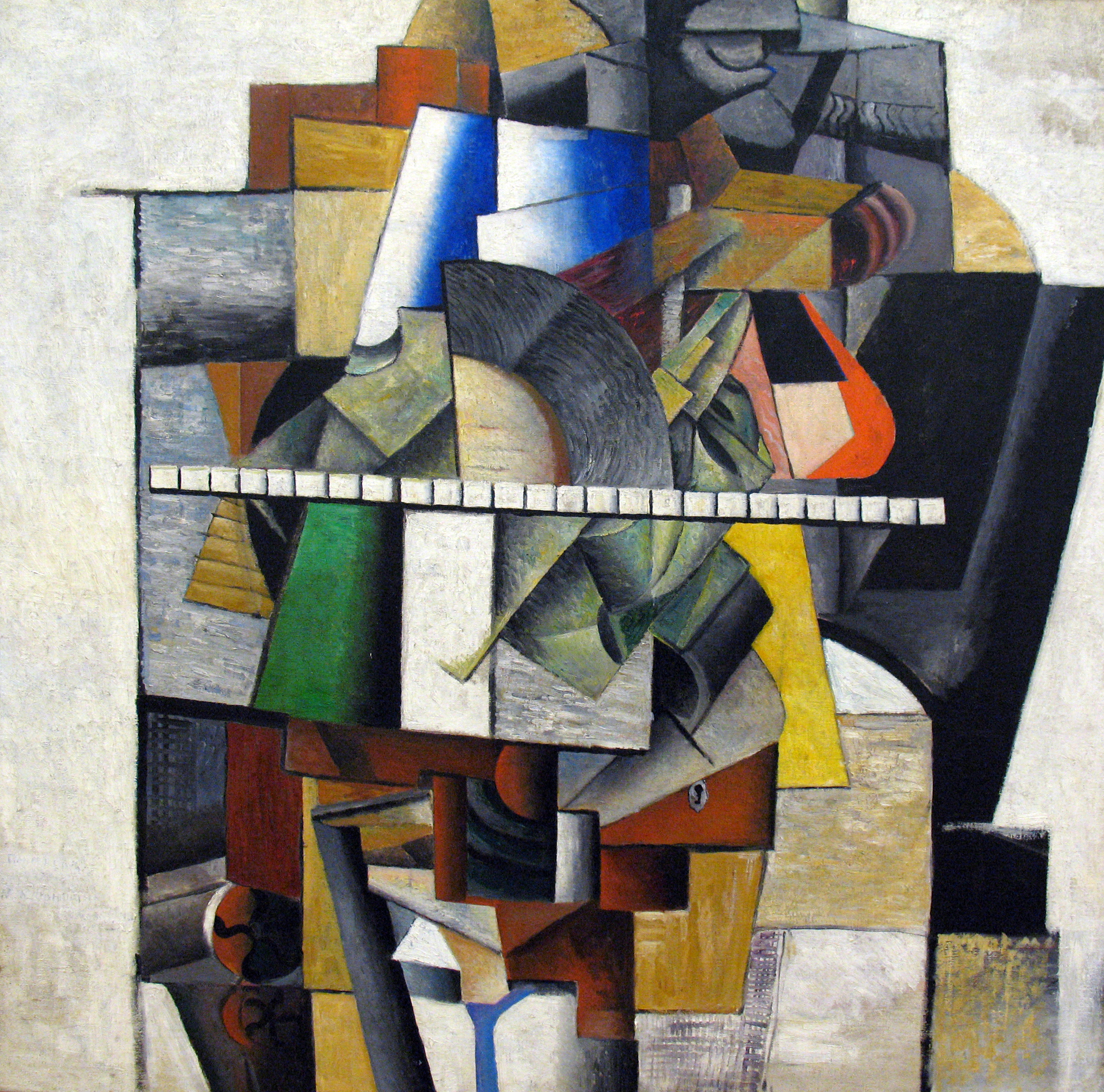
Portrait of Mikhail Matyushin (1913, Tretyakov Gallery)

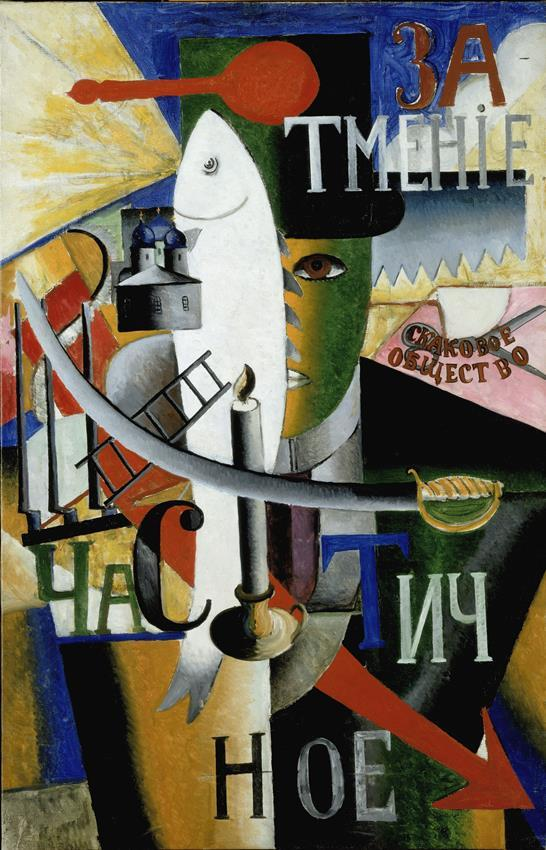
Englishman in Moscow (1914, Stedelijk Museum)

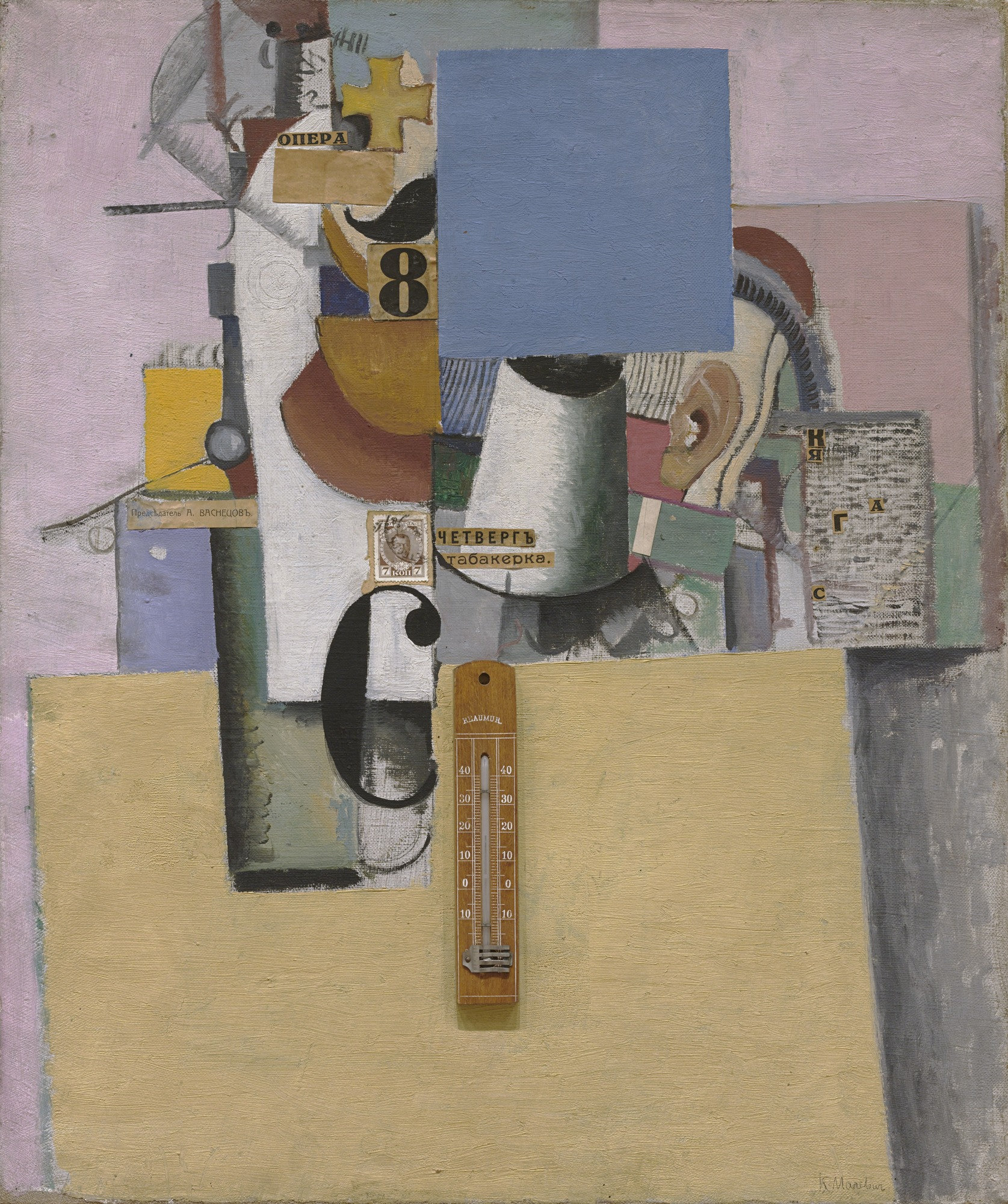
Reservist of the First Division (1914, Museum of Modern Art)

== Suprematism (1915–1918) ==
=== Last Futurist Exhibition 0,10 (1915) ===
In March 1915, Malevich took part in the Tramway V: First Futurist Exhibition in Petrograd, organized by Ivan Puni and his wife Ksenia Boguslavskaya, presenting collage-based works still within a Cubo-Futurist idiom. At the same time, Malevich became increasingly critical of Cubo-Futurism's dependence on the object, which he would later argue prevented painting from achieving self-sufficiency of pure form. In a letter to Matyushin dated 27 May, Malevich referenced his curtain drawing for Victory Over the Sun and declared that "that which was done unconsciously, now bears extraordinary fruit", a statement interpreted as an early articulation of the ideas that would become Suprematism. Over the summer of 1915, Malevich produced his first abstract composition featuring a black quadrilateral on a white ground. When Puni visited his studio that September and saw the new work, Malevich—concerned that his ideas would be copied—composed his first text on Suprematism with Matyushin's assistance.

On 19 December 1915, Malevich presented thirty-nine abstract oil paintings at the Last Futurist Exhibition of Paintings 0,10, held at the Art Bureau of Madame Nadezhda Dobychina in Petrograd. He hung the black quadrilateral painting in the upper corner of the room, a placement that echoed the position traditionally reserved for icons in Russian domestic interiors. To accompany the exhibition, Malevich published a brochure entitled From Cubism to Suprematism in Art, to New Realism in Painting, to Absolute Creation, later republished in expanded form as From Cubism and Futurism to Suprematism: The New Painterly Realism. In the adjacent room, Tatlin exhibited his corner reliefs. Puni, Malevich, Boguslavskaya, Klyun, and Mikhail Menkov collectively published a short manifesto. The exhibition was visited by more than 6,000 people.

In 1915–1916, he worked with other Suprematist artists in a peasant/artisan co-operative in Skoptsi and Verbovka village. In 1916–1917, he participated in exhibitions of the Jack of Diamonds group in Moscow together with Nathan Altman, David Burliuk, Aleksandra Ekster and others. Famous examples of his Suprematist works include Black Square (1915) and White On White (1918).

=== The Black Square ===
Malevich exhibited his first Black Square, now at the Tretyakov Gallery in Moscow, in Petrograd in 1915. The second Black Square was painted around 1923. Some believe that the third Black Square (also at the Tretyakov Gallery) was painted in 1929 for Malevich's solo exhibition, because of the poor condition of the 1915 square. One more Black Square, the smallest and probably the last, may have been intended as a diptych together with the Red Square (though of smaller size) for the exhibition Artists of the RSFSR: 15 Years, held in Leningrad (1932). The two squares, Black and Red, were the centerpiece of the show. This last square, despite the author's note 1913 on the reverse, is believed to have been created in the late twenties or early thirties, for there are no earlier mentions of it.

While Malevich's ideas and theories behind Suprematism were grounded in a belief in the spiritual and transformative power of art, he saw Suprematism as a way to access a higher, more pure realm of artistic expression and to tap into the spiritual through abstraction. Thus, the overarching philosophy of Suprematism expressed in various manifestos would be that he "transformed himself in the zero of form and dragged himself out of the rubbish-heap of illusion and the pit of naturalism. He destroyed the ring of the horizon and escaped from the circle of objects, moving from the horizon-ring to the circle of spirit".

Malevich's student Anna Leporskaya observed that Malevich "neither knew nor understood what the black square contained. He thought it so important an event in his creation that for a whole week he was unable to eat, drink or sleep". In 1918, Malevich decorated a play, Mystery-Bouffe, by Vladimir Mayakovskiy produced by Vsevolod Meyerhold. He was interested in aerial photography and aviation, which led him to abstractions inspired by or derived from aerial landscapes.

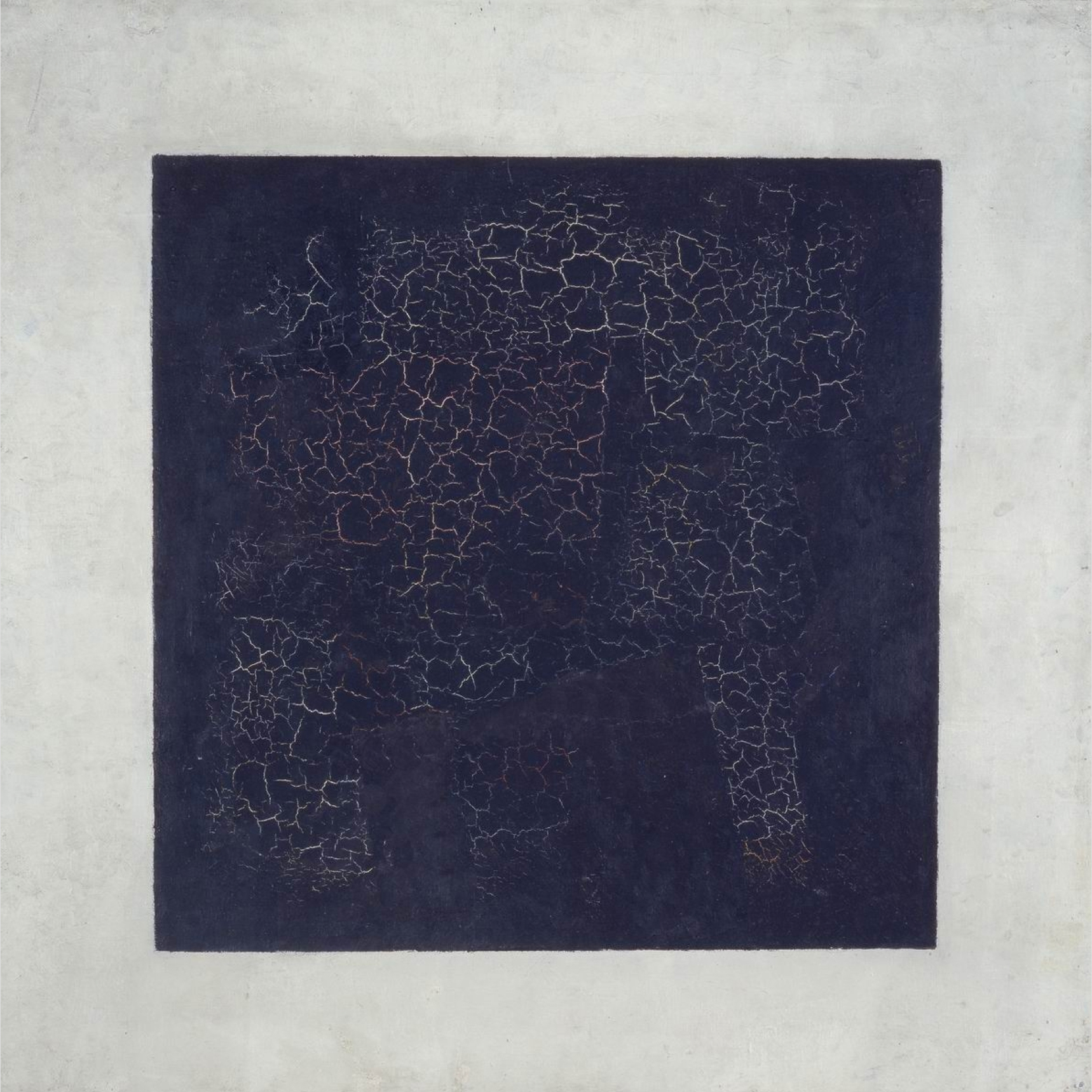
Black Square (1915, Tretyakov Gallery)

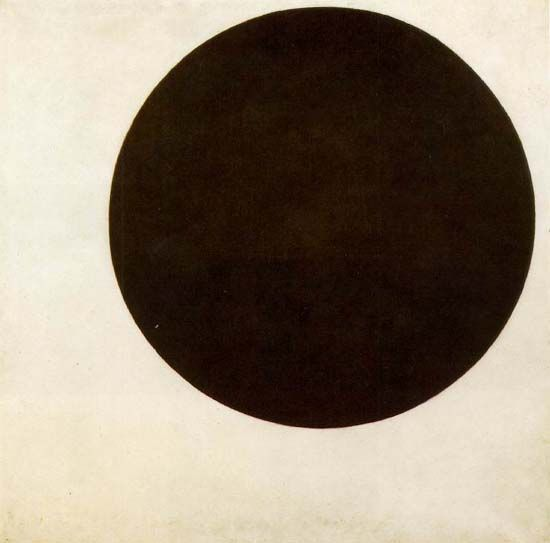
Black Circle (motive 1915, painted 1924, State Russian Museum)

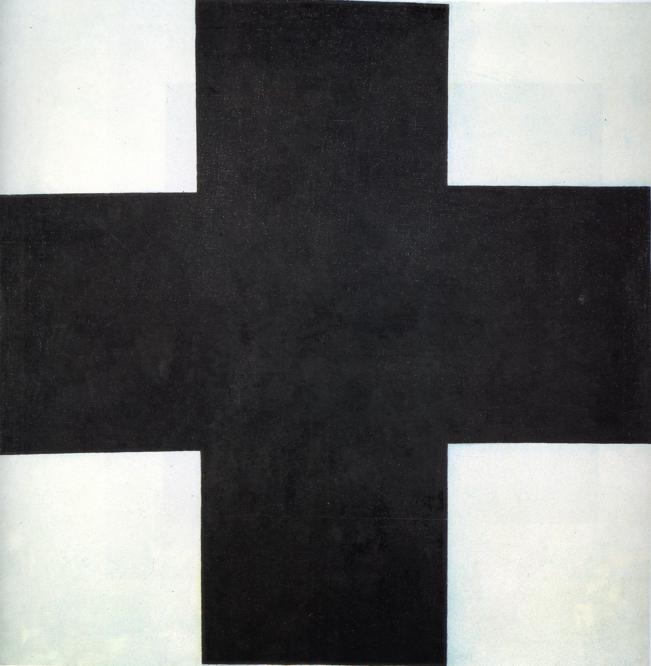
Black Cross (1920s, State Russian Museum)

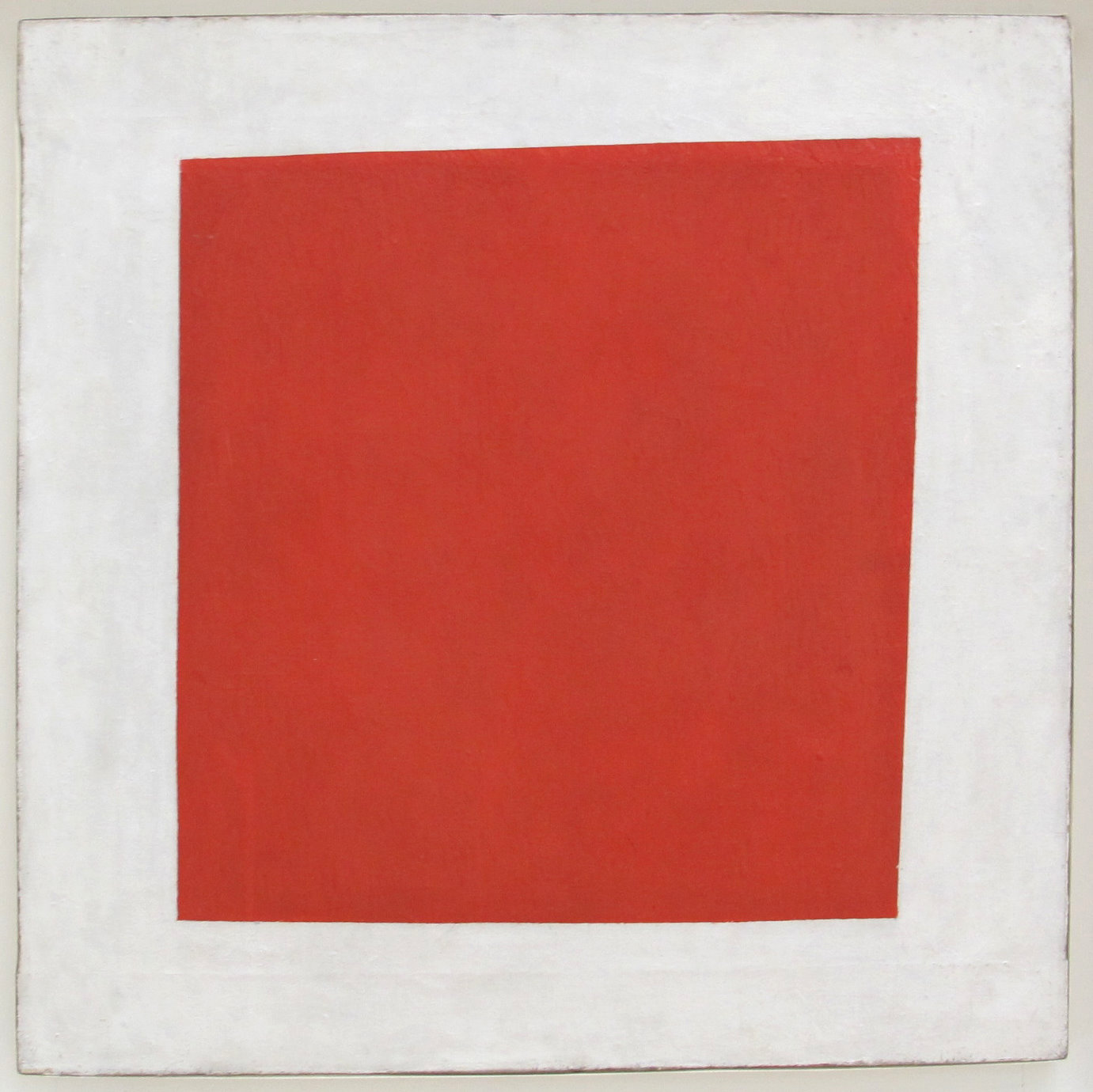
Red Square (1915, State Russian Museum)

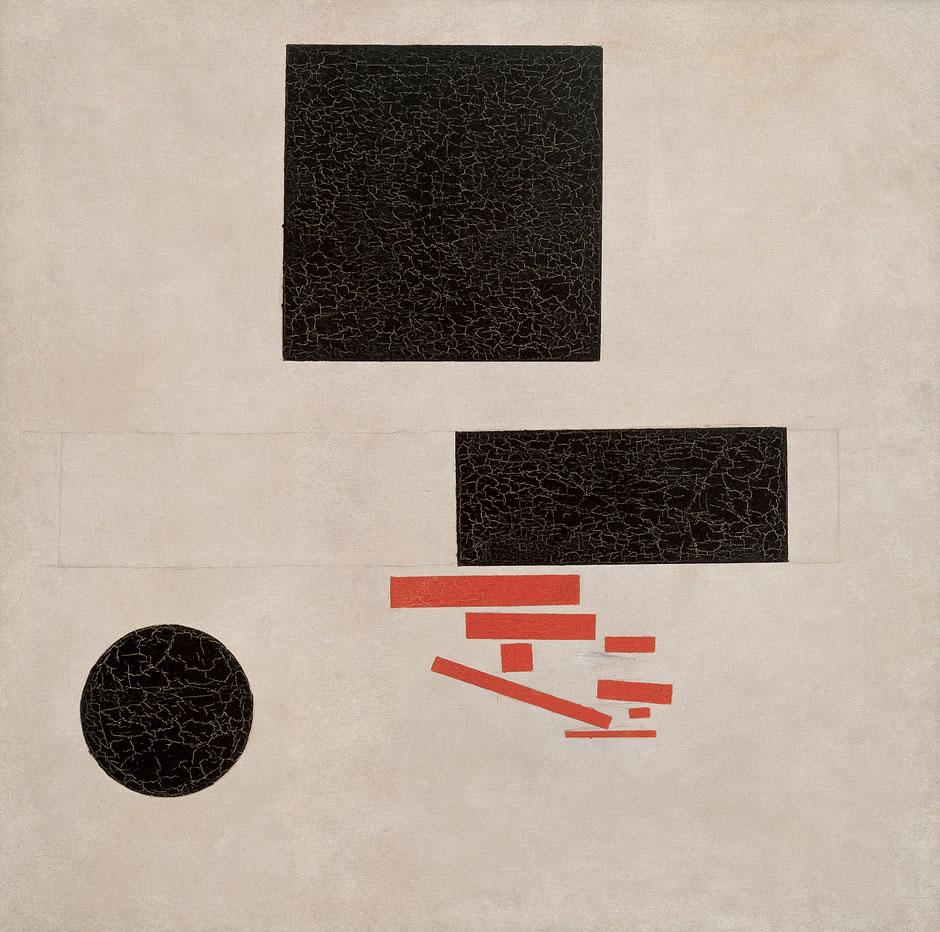
Suprematist Composition (1915, Beyeler Foundation)

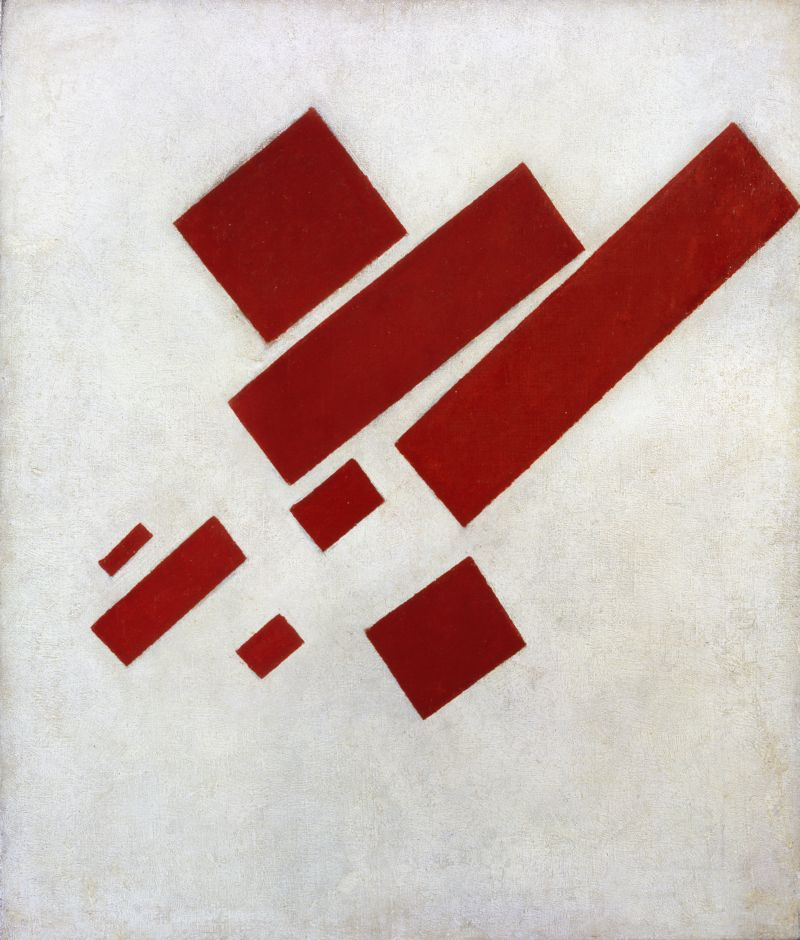
Suprematist Painting: Eight Red Rectangles (1915, Stedelijk Museum)

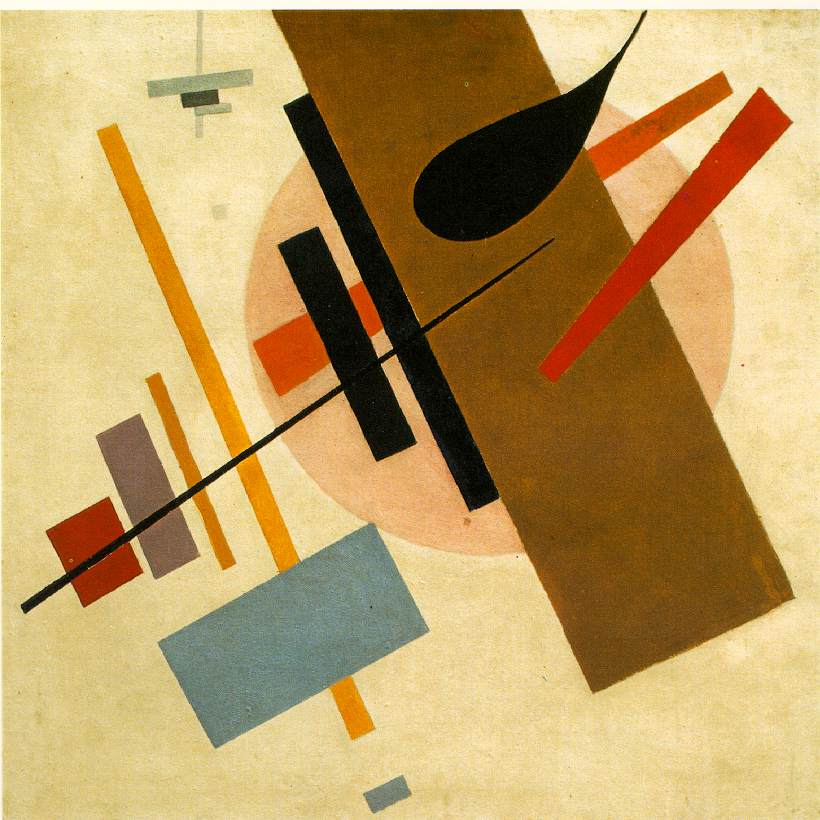
Supremus No. 55 (1916, Museum of Art, Krasnodar)

=== Painting technique ===
According to an observation by radiologist and art historian Milda Victurina, one of the features of Kazimir Malevich's painting technique was the layering of paints one on another to get a special kind of colour spots. For example, Malevich used two layers of colour for the red spot—the lower black and the upper red. The light ray going through these colour layers is perceived by the viewer not as red, but with a touch of darkness. This technique of superimposing the two colours allowed experts to identify fakes of Malevich's work, which generally lacked it.

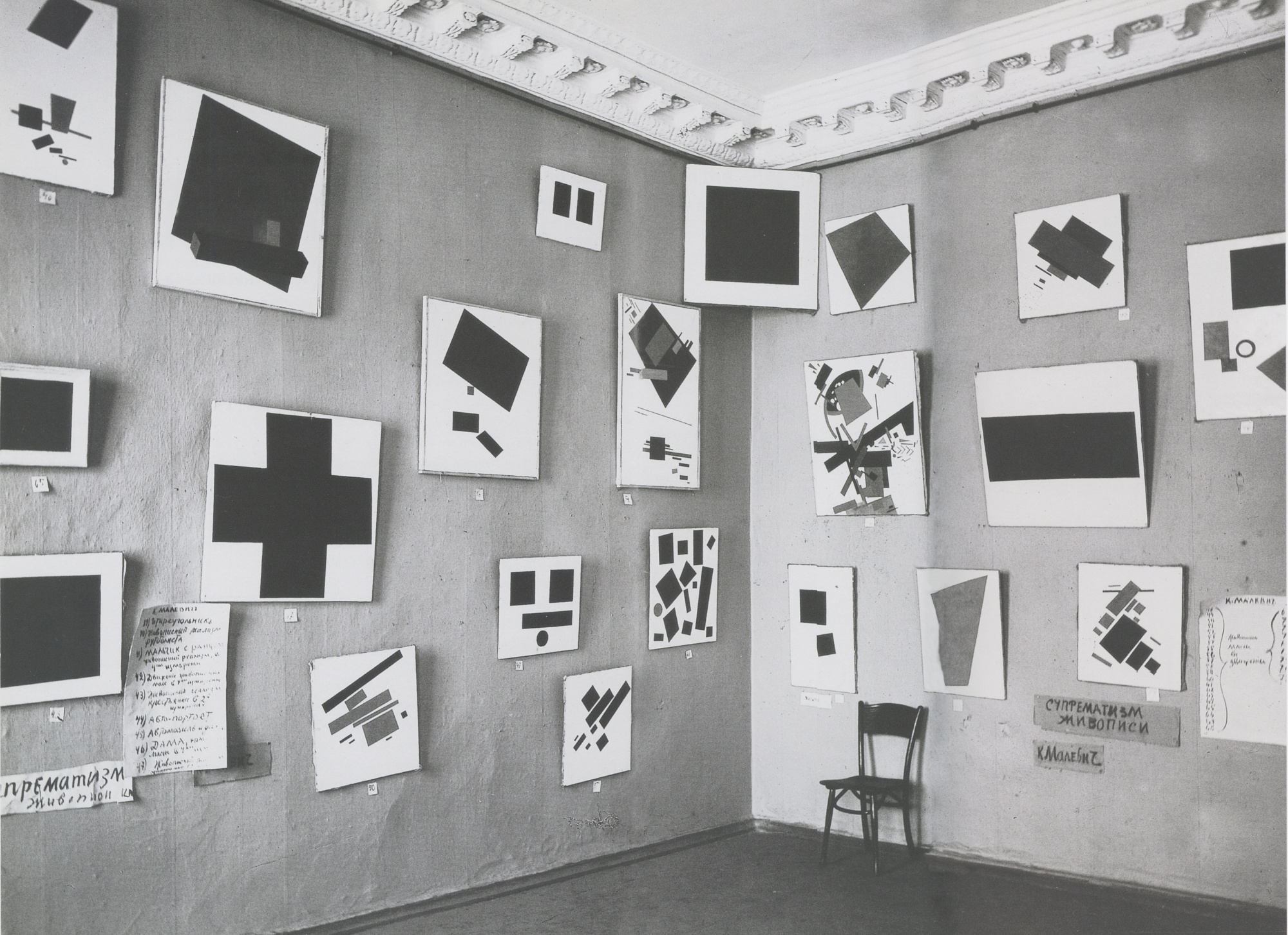
Suprematist works by Malevich at the 0.10 Exhibition, Petrograd, 1915

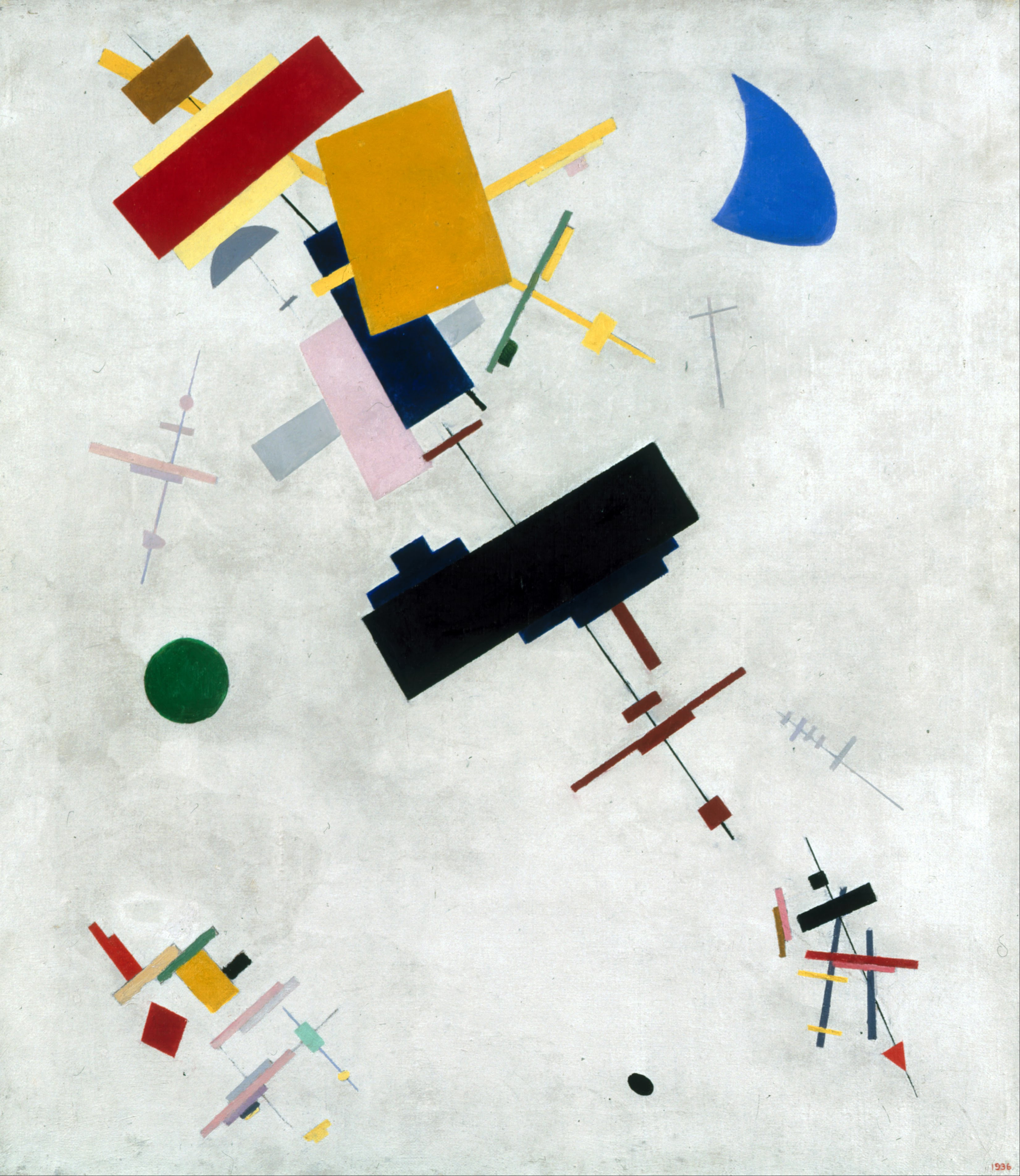
Suprematism, oil on canvas, 1915, Russian Museum

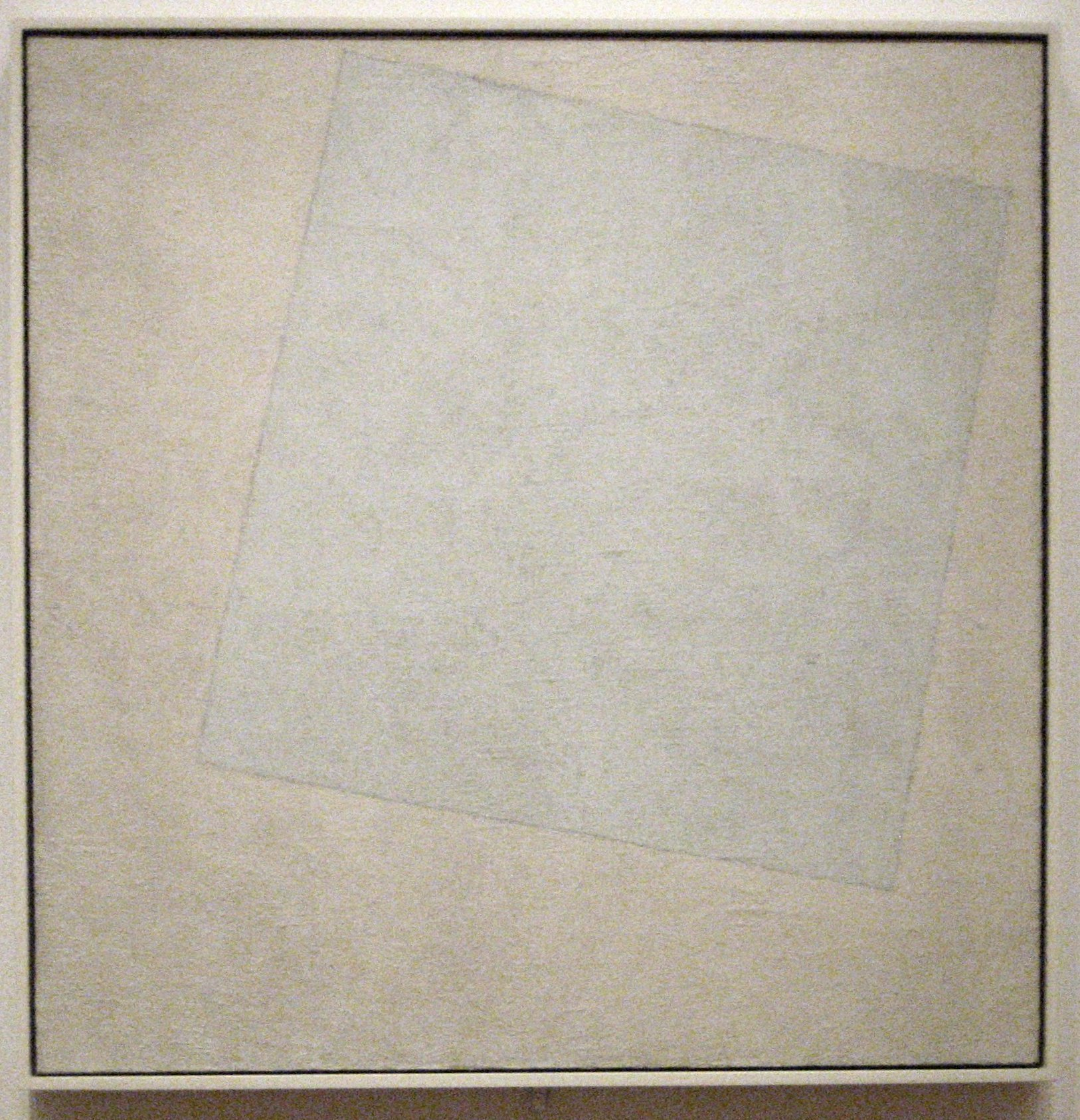
Suprematist Composition: White on White, oil on canvas, 1918, The Museum of Modern Art, New York

== Post-revolutionary years (1918–1935) ==
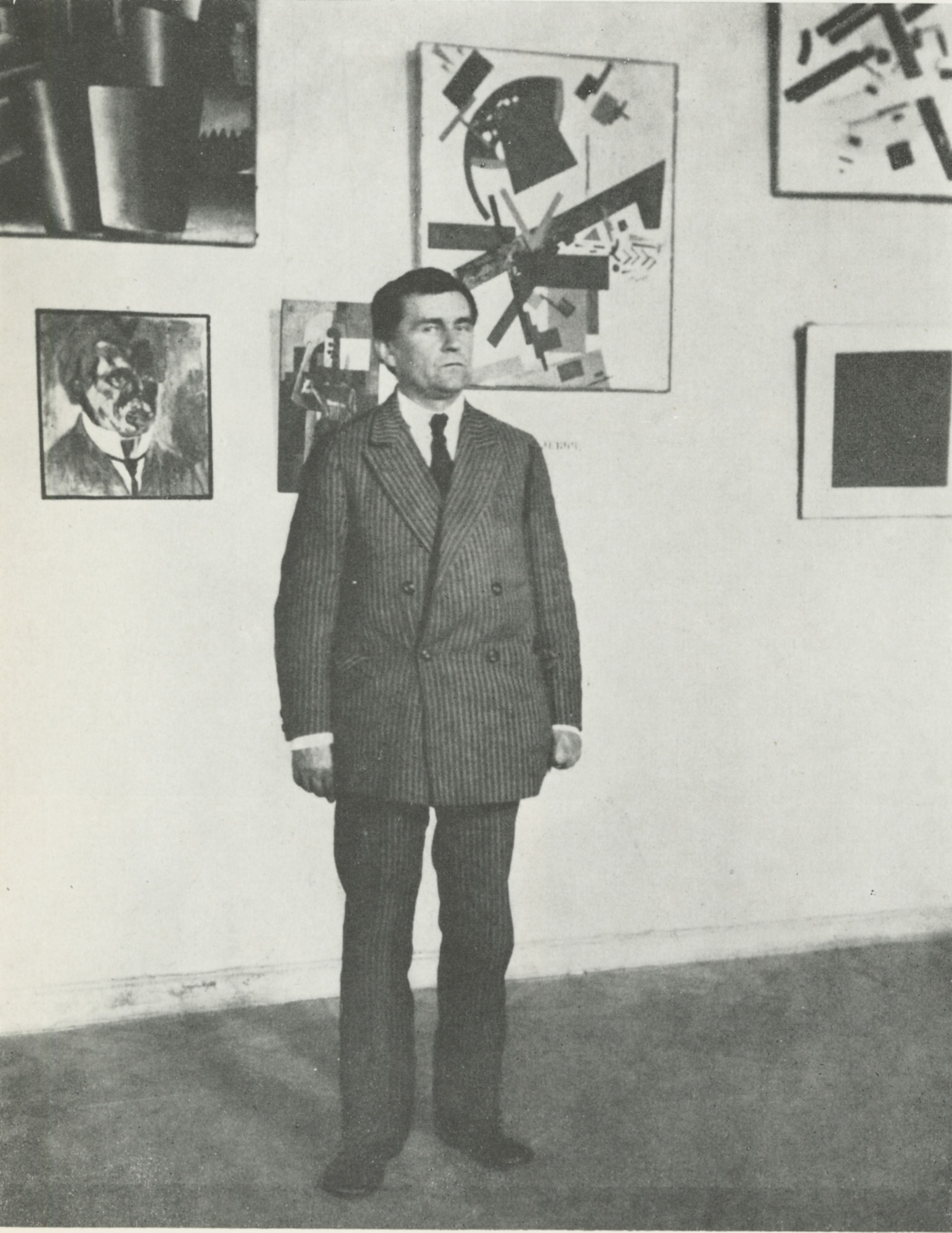
Kazimir Malevich with his paintings in Leningrad (1924)

After the October Revolution (1917), the Russian Civil War ensued. Between 1918 and 1919, Malevich became a member of the Collegium on the Arts of Narkompros, the Commission for the Protection of Monuments and the Museums Commission. He taught at the Vitebsk Practical Art School in Belarus (1919–1922) alongside Marc Chagall, the Leningrad Academy of Arts (1922–1927), the Kiev Art Institute (1928–1930), and the House of the Arts in Leningrad (1930). He wrote the book The Non-Objective World, which was published in Munich in 1926 and translated into English in 1959. In it, he outlines his Suprematist theories.

Following the Bolshevik victory in the Civil War, the Union of Soviet Socialist Republics was established in 1922, led by Vladimir Lenin. In 1923, Malevich was appointed director of Petrograd State Institute of Artistic Culture, which was forced to close in 1926 after a Communist party newspaper called it "a government-supported monastery" rife with "counterrevolutionary sermonizing and artistic debauchery." The Soviet state was by then heavily promoting an idealized, propagandistic style of art called Socialist Realism—a style Malevich had spent his entire career repudiating. Nevertheless, he swam with the current, and was quietly tolerated by the Communists.

=== Stalinism and censorship ===
Malevich's assumption that a shifting in the attitudes of the Soviet authorities toward the modernist art movement would take place after the death of Vladimir Lenin in 1924 and Leon Trotsky's fall from power was proven correct in a couple of years, when the government of Joseph Stalin turned against forms of abstraction, considering them a type of "bourgeois" art, that could not express social realities. As a consequence, many of his works were confiscated and he was removed from his teaching position.

In autumn 1930, he was arrested and interrogated by the OGPU in Leningrad, accused of Polish espionage, and threatened with execution. He was released from imprisonment in early December. Critics derided Malevich's art as a negation of everything good and pure: love of life and love of nature. The Westernizer artist and art historian Alexandre Benois was one such critic. Malevich responded that art can advance and develop for art's sake alone, saying that "art does not need us, and it never did". In 1934, Socialist Realism was officially imposed as the only permissible form of artistic expression in the Soviet Union, effectively banning avant-garde art.

=== Travel to Poland and Germany (1927) ===
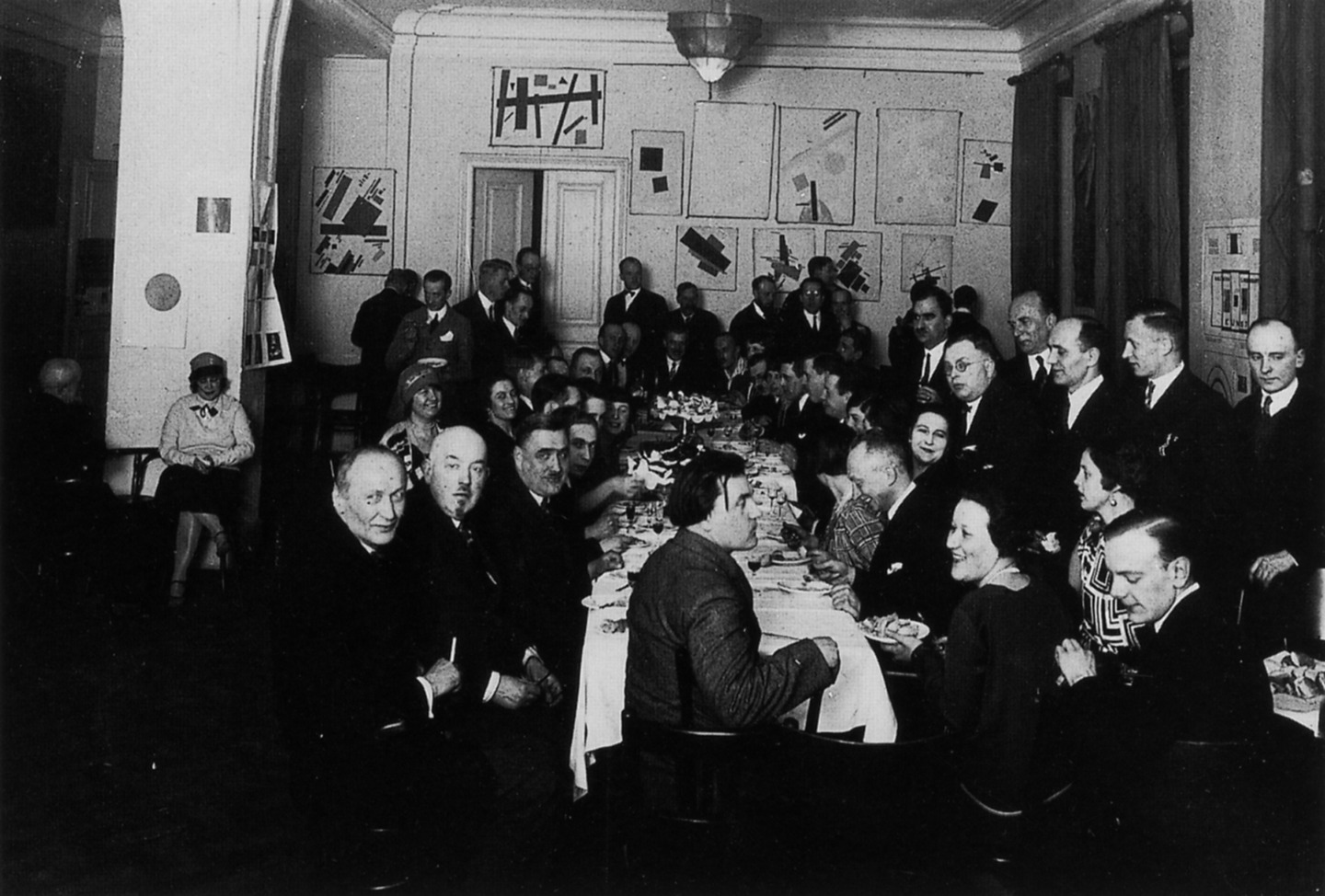
Banquet celebrating Kazimir Malevich's 1927 exhibition at Hotel Polonia in Warsaw, with multiple Suprematist paintings seen hung on the wall in the back

In March 1927, Malevich traveled to Warsaw where he exhibited his work at the Polish Arts Club housed in the Polonia Hotel. He met with several Polish artists, including his former students Władysław Strzemiński (whose own theory of Unism was highly influenced by Malevich), sculptor Katarzyna Kobro and Henryk Stażewski, an abstract painter associated with the Polish Constructivist movement.

While generally greeted with enthusiasm, Malevich faced criticism from some contemporary artists, including Mieczysław Szczuka, who argued that Suprematism, as understood by Malevich, was no longer relevant for Polish utilitarianism-oriented avant-garde and that the artist was "a Romantic who loves painterly means for their own sake". Art historian Matthew Drutt notes that despite these criticisms, Malevich's Warsaw exhibition and the lecture on Suprematism he had delivered during his visit had a lasting effect on Polish modernism. At the end of March 1927, Malevich and Tadeusz Peiper, a Polish poet and art critic who was the editor of the literary journal Zwrotnica, left Warsaw for Berlin. In April that year, him and Peiper visited the Bauhaus in Dessau, where they met with Walter Gropius and László Moholy-Nagy.

Malevich returned to Berlin in May 1927 to participate in the Great Berlin Art Exhibition. Over seventy of his works, including paintings, gouaches, charts, and drawings that spanned the entirety of the artist's oeuvre, were displayed at the exhibition. He arranged to leave most of the paintings behind when he returned to the Soviet Union. The Berlin show has been described as "a defining moment in Malevich's career in terms of the reception of his work in the West" and it became a "primary source of knowledge of Malevich's oeuvre for the next fifty years". The manuscripts the artist left in Berlin, rediscovered in 1954 and translated to German in 1962, have been referred to as "the other pillar to the recovery of his oeuvre" in subsequent decades.

=== Death ===
Malevich died of cancer in Leningrad on 15 May 1935. On his deathbed, Malevich had been exhibited with the Black Square above him, and mourners at his funeral rally were permitted to wave a banner bearing a black square. Malevich had asked to be buried under an oak tree on the outskirts of Nemchinovka, a place to which he felt a special bond. His ashes were sent to Nemchinovka, and buried in a field near his dacha. Nikolai Suetin, a friend of Malevich's and a fellow artist, designed a white cube with a black square to mark the burial site. The memorial was destroyed during World War II. The city of Leningrad bestowed a pension on Malevich's mother and daughter.

In Nazi Germany his works were banned as "Degenerate Art". In 2013, an apartment block was built on the place of the tomb and burial site of Kazimir Malevich. Another nearby monument to Malevich, put up in 1988, is now also situated on the grounds of a gated community.

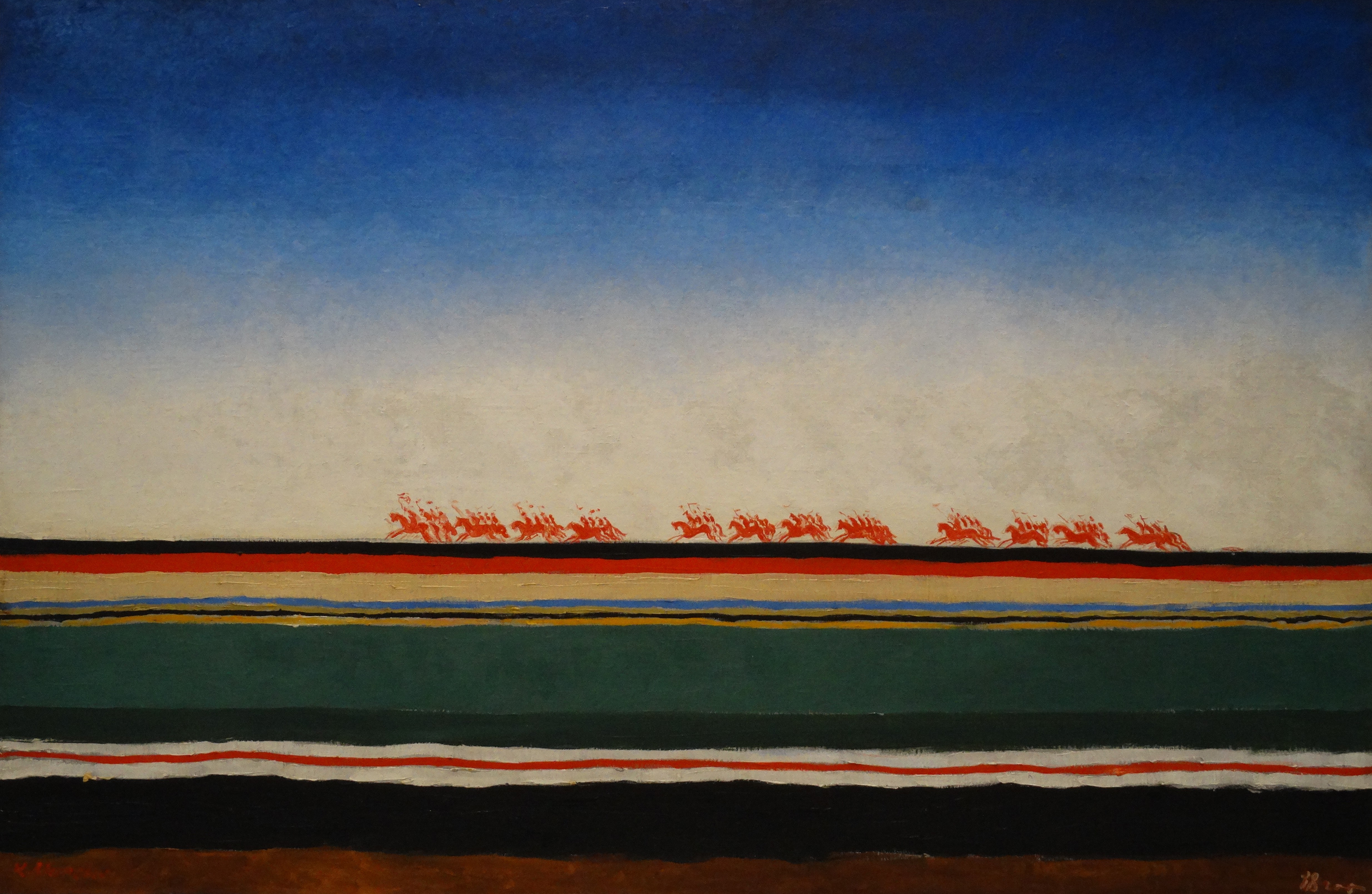
Red Cavalry Riding (1928–1932, Russian Museum)

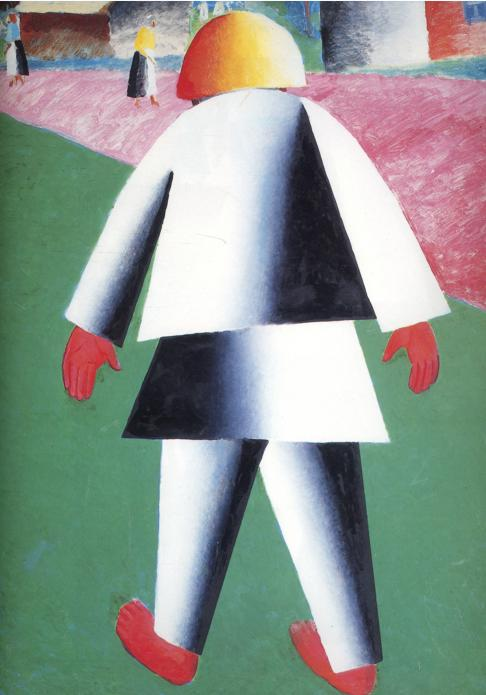
Boy (1928–1932, Russian Museum)

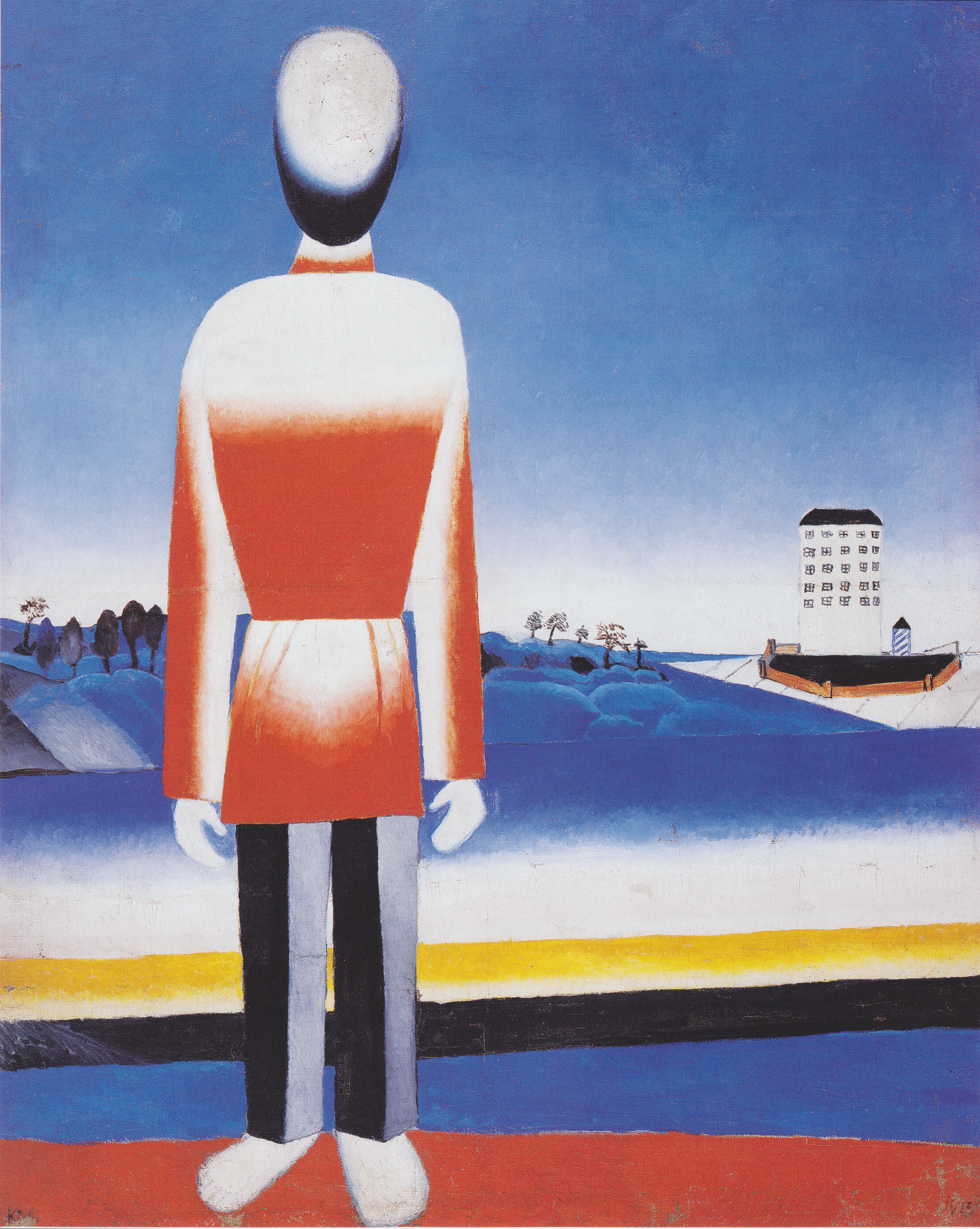
Sensation of an Imprisoned Man (1930–31, Albertina)

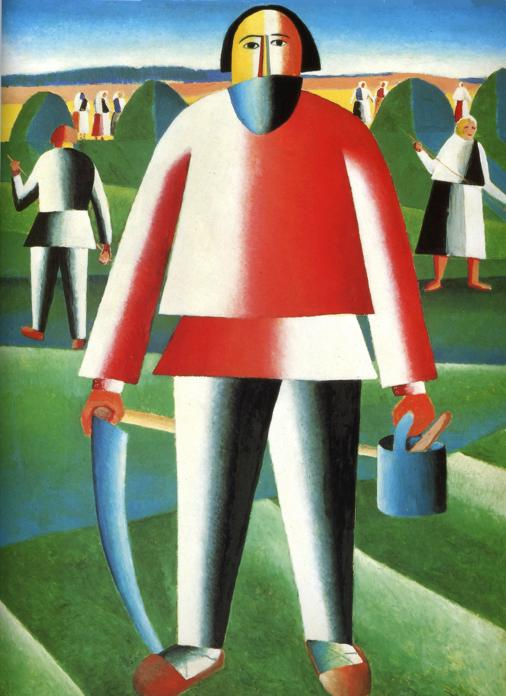
Mower (1930, Tretyakov Gallery)

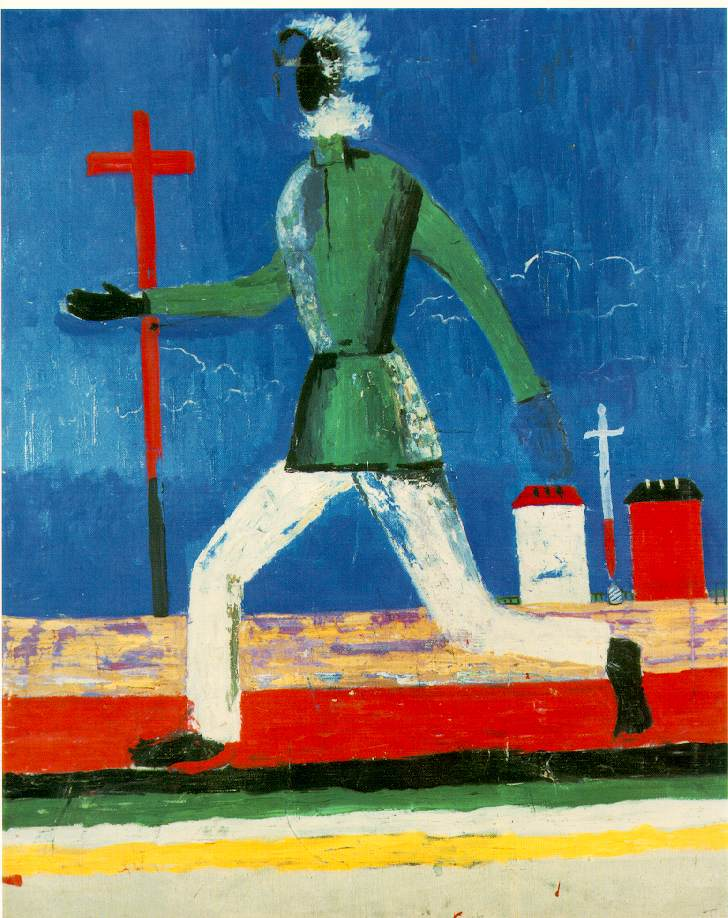
Sensation of Danger or Running Man (1930–31, Musée National d'Art Moderne)

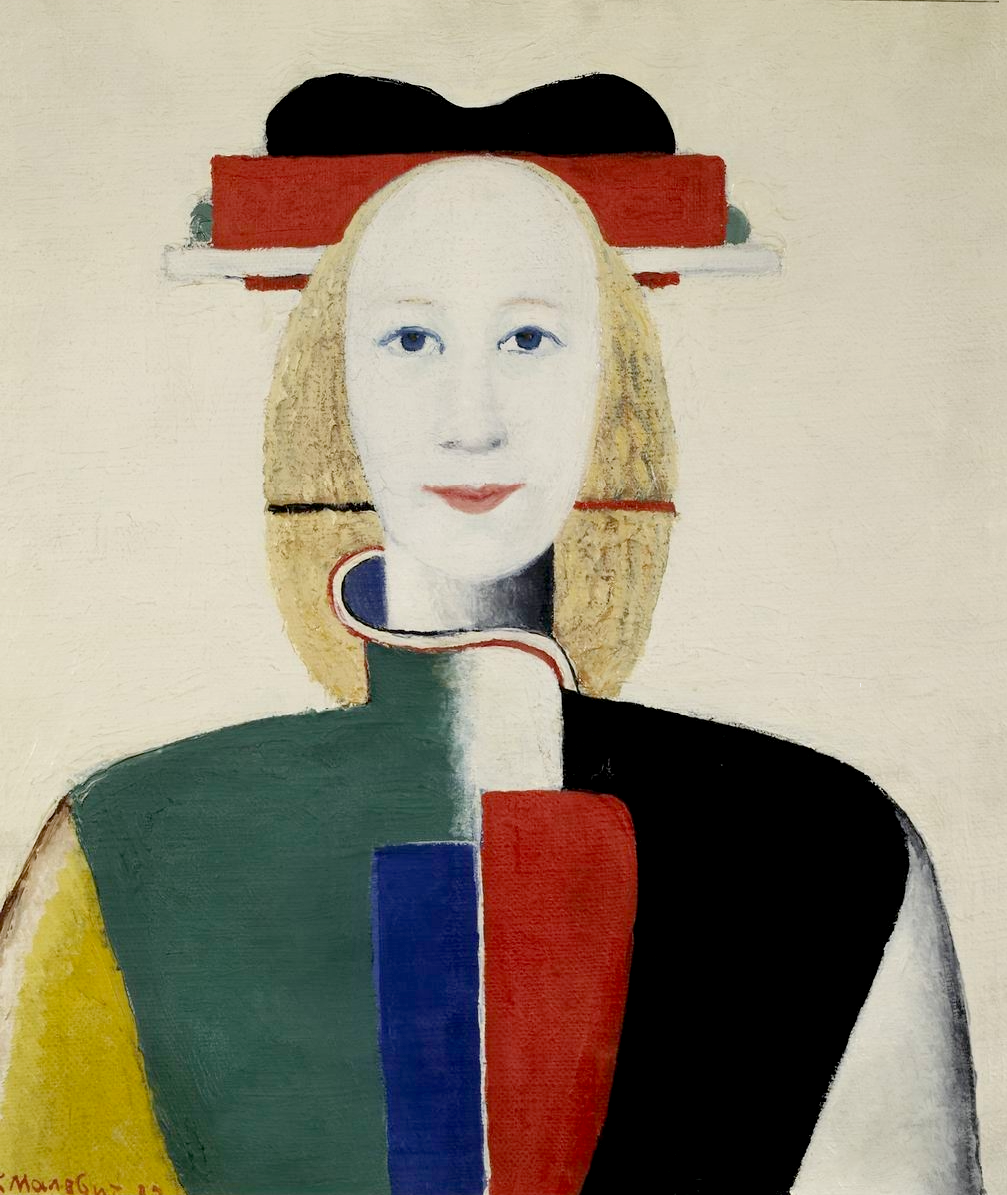
Girl with a Comb in her Hair (1933, Tretyakov Gallery)

== Nationality and ethnicity ==
Malevich's nationality has been a subject of scholarly dispute. Most academic literature, particularly in the Anglophone world, and major Western museum collections have historically identified him as a Russian (and later Soviet) avant-garde painter, associated chiefly with Moscow and Petrograd (modern-day St. Petersburg), where he spent most of his career and achieved prominence.

Some scholars have argued that this label reflects a broader tendency in Soviet and Western art history to subsume the avant-garde of the wider Russian Empire and Soviet Union under "Russian", foregrounding the imperial and Soviet capitals while giving little weight to Malevich's formative years in Ukraine. Since 2022, several major Western museums have reattributed or recontextualized works by artists born in present-day Ukraine, including Malevich, prompting both support and scholarly objection. Malevich's self-identification was contextual and shifting; throughout his career, he described or referred to himself as Ukrainian and Polish.

=== Polish ===
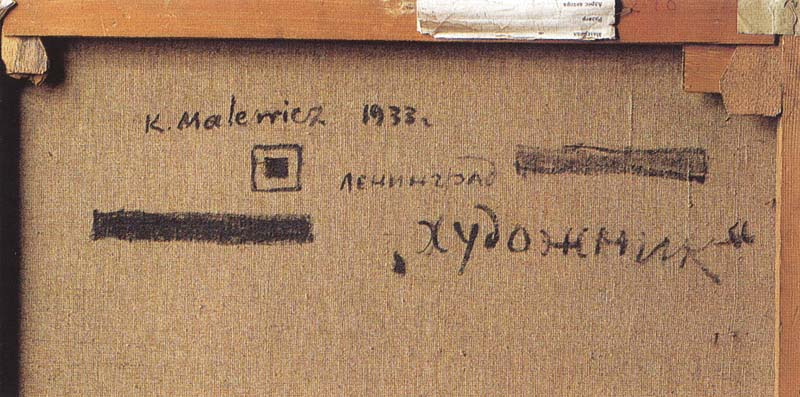
Verso of Malevich's self-portrait from 1933 (Artist, oil on canvas, Russian Museum) showing his signature written in Polish next to the work's title written in Cyrillic.

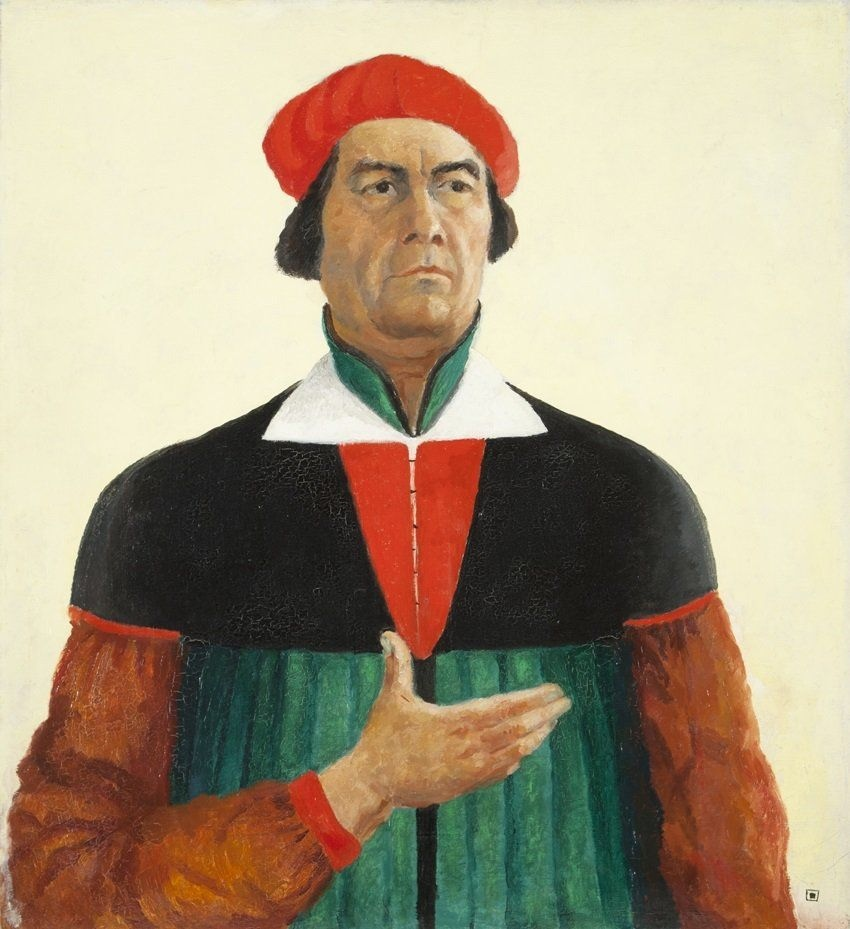

Malevich's family was one of the millions of Poles who lived within the Russian Empire following the Partitions of Poland. Kazimir Malevich was born near Kiev on lands that had previously been part of the Polish–Lithuanian Commonwealth of parents who were ethnic Poles. Both Polish and Russian were native languages of Malevich, who would sign his artwork in the Polish form of his name as Kazimierz Malewicz. His mother Ludwika wrote poetry in Polish and sang Polish songs, and kept a record of the Polish families living in the area. In a 1926 visa application to travel to France, Malewicz claimed Polish as his nationality. French art historian Andrei Nakov, who re-established Malevich's birth year as 1879 (and not 1878), has argued for restoration of the Polish spelling of Malevich's name.

In 1985, Polish performance artist Zbigniew Warpechowski performed "Citizenship for a Pure Feeling of Kazimierz Malewicz" as an homage to the great artist and critique of Polish authorities that refused to grant Polish citizenship to Kazimir Malevich. In 2013, Malevich's family in New York City and fans founded the not-for-profit The Rectangular Circle of Friends of Kazimierz Malewicz, whose dedicated goal is to promote awareness of Kazimir's Polish ethnicity.

=== Ukrainian ===
According to Russian scholars Tatiana Mikhienko and Irina Vakar, the secret police file from Malevich's arrest on September 20, 1930 indicates that Malevich declared his nationality as Ukrainian. Scholar Marie Gasper-Hulvat notes that this may have been in part motivated by Malevich's desire to avoid anti-Polish discrimination, since Ukraine was at that time part of the Soviet Union. It is sometimes claimed that he self-identified as a Ukrainian throughout his life. Similarly, the French art historian Gilles Néret claimed that Malevich, while at times identifying as Polish "out of tact or mischief" and using the Polish spelling of his name, always emphasized his Ukrainian background.

Following the Russian invasion of Ukraine in 2022 there has been more political and cultural pressure to reconsider his Russian nationality and to identify him instead as a Ukrainian painter. This push resulted in the Metropolitan Museum of Art relabeling him as a Ukrainian painter, and later Stedelijk Museum labeling him as a "Ukrainian painter of Polish origin". The relabeling caused a backlash from Russia, including a statement from the Ministry of Foreign Affairs. However, the consensus among art historians, including those of Ukrainian origin, is that whereas the discussion (related to Russian colonialism) clearly needs to take place among all involved parties, it has not yet occurred, and the question concerning the identity of Malevich has not been solved as of 2023.

== Legacy ==
Alfred H. Barr Jr. included several paintings in the groundbreaking exhibition "Cubism and Abstract Art" at the Museum of Modern Art in New York in 1936. In 1939, the Museum of Non-Objective Painting opened in New York, whose founder, Solomon R. Guggenheim—an early and passionate collector of the Russian avant-garde—was inspired by the same aesthetic ideals and spiritual quest that exemplified Malevich's art. The first U.S. retrospective of Malevich's work in 1973 at the Solomon R. Guggenheim Museum provoked a flood of interest and further intensified his impact on postwar American and European artists.

However, most of Malevich's work and the story of the Russian avant-garde remained under lock and key until Glasnost. In 1989, the Stedelijk Museum in Amsterdam held the West's first large-scale Malevich retrospective, including the paintings they owned and works from the collection of Russian art critic Nikolai Khardzhiev. From 15 January - 4 April 1993, the Fundación Juan March, Madrid exhibited Malevich. Collection of the Russian State Museum, Saint Petersburg. The exhibit was the first retrospective of Malevich's work in Spain. The exhibit later traveled to Museo Picasso, Barcelona (22 April - 6 June 1993) and I.V.A.M., Valencia (23 June - 29 August 1993).

=== Collections ===
Malevich's works are held in several major art museums, including the State Tretyakov Gallery in Moscow, and in New York, the Museum of Modern Art and the Guggenheim Museum. The Stedelijk Museum in Amsterdam owns 24 Malevich paintings, more than any other museum outside of Russia. Another major collection of Malevich works is held by the State Museum of Contemporary Art in Thessaloniki.

=== Art market ===
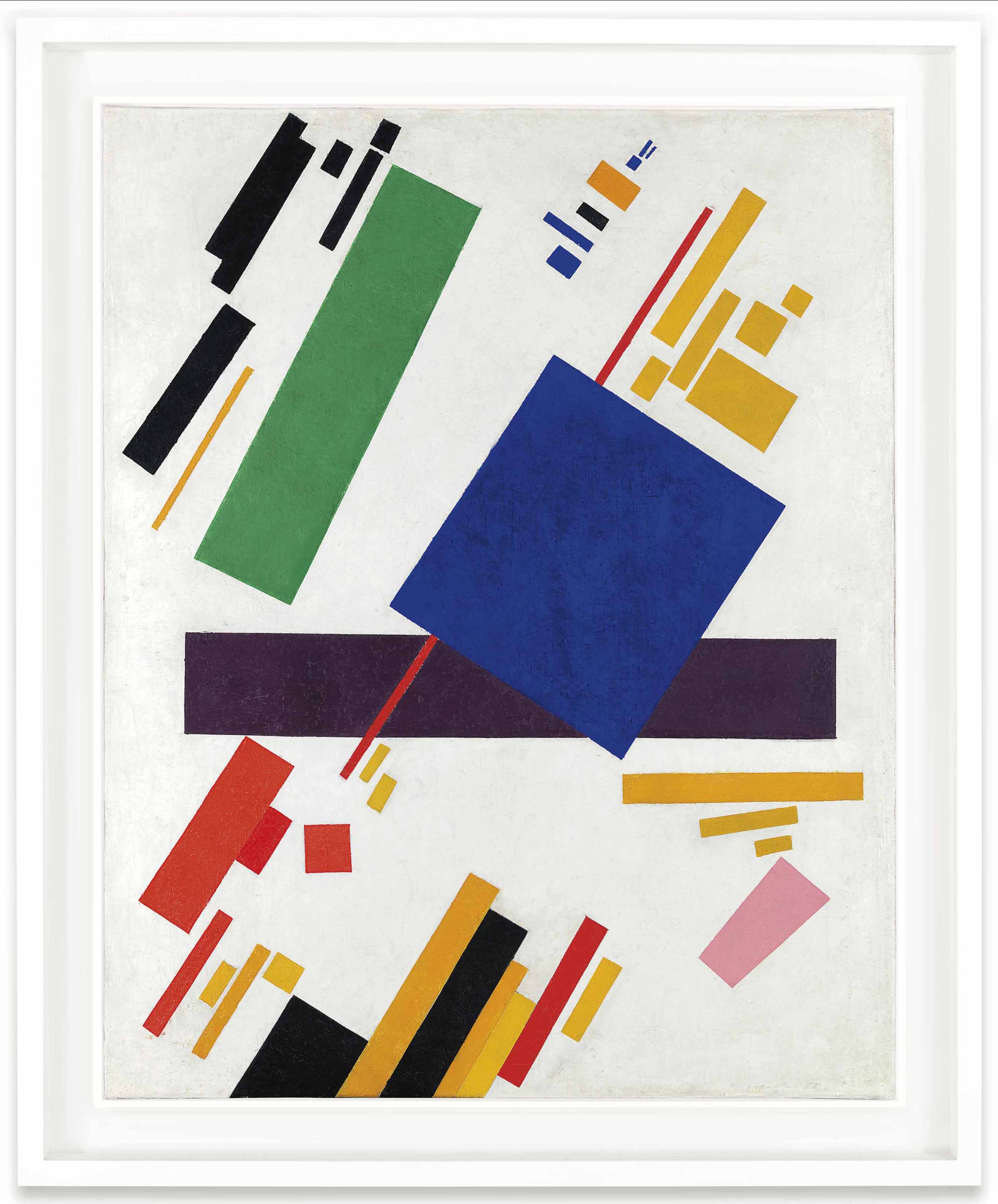
Suprematist Composition (1916), sold at Christie's New York for US$85,812,500 in 2018

Black Square, the fourth version of his magnum opus painted in the 1920s, was discovered in 1993 in Samara and purchased by Inkombank for US$250,000. In April 2002, the painting was auctioned for an equivalent of US$1 million. The purchase was financed by the Russian philanthropist Vladimir Potanin, who donated funds to the Russian Ministry of Culture, and ultimately, to the State Hermitage Museum collection. According to the Hermitage website, this was the largest private contribution to state art museums since the October Revolution.

In 2008, the Stedelijk Museum restituted five works to the heirs of Malevich's family from a group that had been left in Berlin by Malevich, and acquired by the gallery in 1958, in exchange for undisputed title to the remaining pictures. On 3 November 2008, one of these works entitled Suprematist Composition from 1916, set the world record for any Russian work of art and any work sold at auction for that year, selling at Sotheby's in New York City for just over US$60 million (surpassing his previous record of US$17 million set in 2000). In May 2018, the same painting, Suprematist Composition (1916), sold at Christie's New York for over US$85 million (including fees), a record auction price for a Russian work of art.

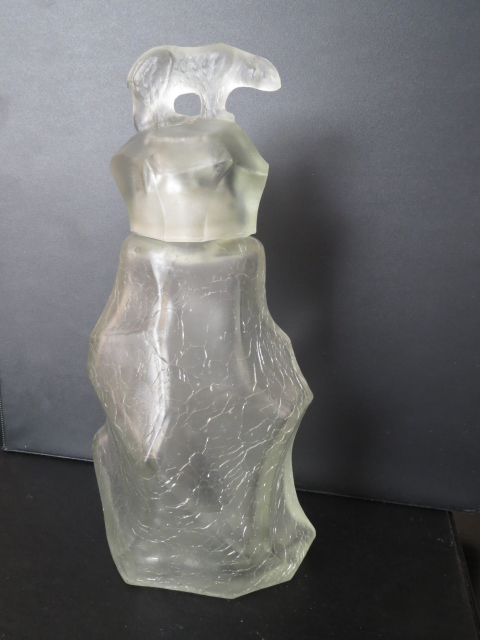
Original Malevich-designed frost glass bottle with craquelure for "Severny eau de cologne" (1911–1922)

=== In popular culture ===
Malevich's life inspires many references featuring events and the paintings as players. The smuggling of Malevich paintings out of Russia is a key to the plot line of writer Martin Cruz Smith's thriller Red Square. Noah Charney's novel, The Art Thief tells the story of two stolen Malevich White on White paintings, and discusses the implications of Malevich's radical Suprematist compositions on the art world. British artist Keith Coventry has used Malevich's paintings to make comments on modernism, in particular his Estate Paintings. Malevich's work also is featured prominently in the Lars von Trier film, Melancholia. At the Closing Ceremony of the 2014 Winter Olympics in Sochi, Malevich visual themes were featured (via projections) in a section on 20th century Russian modern art.

In 2015, a local businessman in Konotop, Sumy Oblast, Ukraine commissioned Yurii Vedmid to create a monument of Kazimir Malevich, who lived there from 1894 to 1895. In 2016, it became the communal property of the Konotop community and was relocated to the city square outside the House of Trade.

=== Autobiographies ===
Malevich wrote two biographical essays, a shorter one in 1923–25, and a much longer account in 1933, representing the artist's explanation of his own evolution up to the appearance of suprematism at the 1915 "0–10" exhibition in Petrograd. Both are published in:

- Vakar, I. A.; Mikhienko, T. N., eds. (2004). Malevich o sebe: Sovremenniki o Maleviche (in Russian). Vol. 1. Moscow: RA. pp. 17–45. ISBN 5269010283.

Abridged and revised translations are published in:

- Malevich, Kazimir (1990). "From 1/42: Autobiographical Notes, 1923–1925". In D'Andrea, Jeanne (ed.). Kazimir Malevich, 1878–1935 : [exhibition], National Gallery of Art, Washington, D.C., 16 September 1990-4 November 1990, the Armand Hammer Museum of Art and Cultural Center, Los Angeles, 28 November 1990–13 January 1991, the Metropolitan Museum of Art, New York, 7 February 1991–24 March 1991. Los Angeles. pp. 169–75. ISBN 0-295-97066-9. OCLC 22999015.

The 1923–25 autobiography appears in:

- Malevich, Kazimir (1968). "IZ 1/42: Avtobiograficheskie zametki, 1923–1925". In Troels, Andersen (ed.). K. S. Malevich: Essays on Art: 1915–1933. Vol. 2. Translated by Glowacki-Prus, Xenia; McMillin, Arnold. Copenhagen: Borgen. pp. 147–54. ISBN 978-0815004196.

The 1933 autobiography appears in:

- Khardzhiev, Nikolai; Malevich, Kazimir; Matiushin, Mikhail (1976). Khardzhiev, Nikolai (ed.). K istorii russkogo avangarda (in Russian). Stockholm: Almqvist and Wiksell International. pp. 85–127. ISBN 9122000836.
- Malevich, Kazimir; Upchurch, Alan (1985). "Chapters from an Artist's Autobiography". October. 34 (Fall 1985): 25–44. doi:10.2307/778487. JSTOR 778487. Archived from the original on 16 October 2022.

== See also ==
- List of Russian artists
- Sergei Senkin
- Oberiu
- UNOVIS

== Bibliography ==
- Crone, Rainer, Kazimir Severinovich Malevich and David Moos. Kazimir Malevich: The Climax of Disclosure. Chicago: University of Chicago Press, 1991.
- Dreikausen, Margret, Aerial Perception: The Earth as Seen from Aircraft and Spacecraft and Its Influence on Contemporary Art (Associated University Presses: Cranbury, NJ; London, England; Mississauga, Ontario: 1985). ISBN 0-87982-040-3
- Drutt, Matthew; Malevich, Kazimir, Kazimir Malevich: suprematism, Guggenheim Museum, 2003, ISBN 0-89207-265-2
- Honour, H. and Fleming, J. (2009) A World History of Art. 7th edn. London: Laurence King Publishing. ISBN 9781856695848
- Malevich, Kasimir, The Non-objective World, Chicago: P. Theobald, 1959. ISBN 0-486-42974-1
- Malevich and his Influence, Kunstmuseum Liechtenstein, 2008. ISBN 978-3-7757-1877-6
- Milner, John; Malevich, Kazimir, Kazimir Malevich and the art of geometry, Yale University Press, 1996. ISBN 0-300-06417-9
- Nakov, Andrei, Kasimir Malevich, Catalogue raisonné, Paris, Adam Biro, 2002
- Nakov, Andrei, vol. IV of Kasimir Malevich, le peintre absolu, Paris, Thalia Édition, 2007
- Néret, Gilles, Kazimir Malevich and Suprematism 1878–1935, Taschen, 2003. ISBN 0-87414-119-2
- Petrova, Yevgenia, Kazimir Malevich in the State Russian Museum. Palace Editions, 2002. ISBN 978-3-930775-76-7. (English Edition)
- Shatskikh, Aleksandra S, and Marian Schwartz, Black Square: Malevich and the Origin of Suprematism, 2012. ISBN 9780300140897
- Shishanov, V.A. Vitebsk Museum of Modern Art: a History of Creation and a Collection. 1918–1941. – Minsk: Medisont, 2007. – 144 p.Mylivepage.ru
- Shkandrij, Myroslav (2019). Avant-Garde Art in Ukraine, 1910–1930: Contested Memories. Boston.
- Tedman, Gary. Soviet Avant Garde Aesthetics, chapter from Aesthetics & Alienation. pp 203–229. 2012. Zero Books. ISBN 978-1-78099-301-0
- Tolstaya, Tatyana, The Square, The New Yorker, 12 June 2015
- Das weiße Rechteck. Schriften zum Film, herausgegeben von Oksana Bulgakowa. PotemkinPress, Berlin 1997, ISBN 3-9804989-2-1
- The White Rectangle. Writings on Film. (In English and the Russian original manuscript). Edited by Oksana Bulgakowa. PotemkinPress, Berlin / Francisco 2000, ISBN 3-9804989-7-2
