= An Englishman in Moscow =

1914 painting by Kazimir Malevich

- англичанин в москве (Russian), Een Engelsman in Moskou (Dutch)
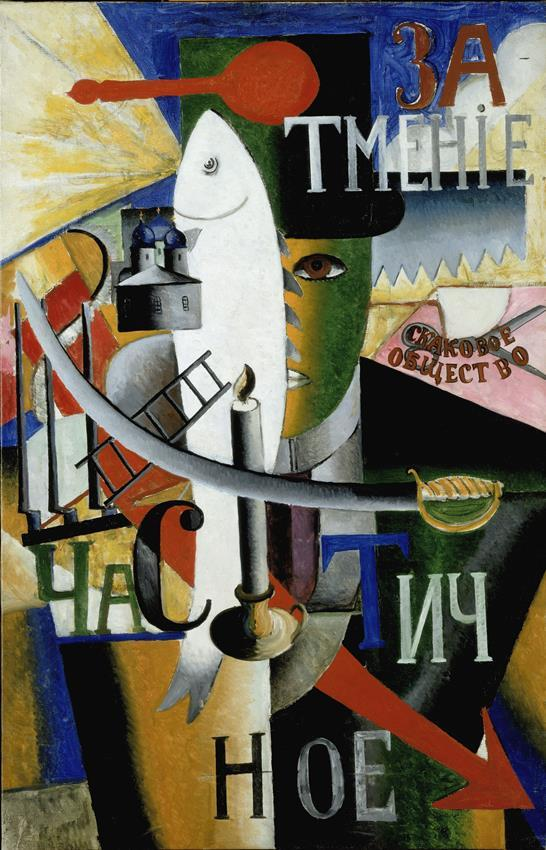
- Artist: Kazimir Malevich
- Year: 1914
- Medium: Oil on canvas
- Movement: Cubo-Futurism, Suprematism
- Dimensions: 88 cm × 57 cm (35 in × 22 in)
- Location: Stedelijk Museum Amsterdam, Amsterdam
- Website: www.stedelijk.nl/en/collection/178-kazimir-malevich-een-engelsman-in-moskou

An Englishman in Moscow (Russian: англичанин в москве, Dutch: Een Engelsman in Moskou), is a 1914 oil on canvas painting by Russian avant-garde artist and art theorist Kazimir Malevich.

== Description ==
The titular Englishman depicted in the painting is wearing a top hat and an overcoat. The man's face is partially obscured by a white fish. Regarding the identity of the man painted by Malevich, the Head of Archives at the Stedelijk Museum, Michiel Nijhoff, has said, "The Englishman is not a specific Englishman but rather a metaphor in the juxtaposition of East and West; city and countryside."

The painting itself features a collage of geometric shapes and items such as a lit candle, scimitar, a ladder, a wooden spoon and other items. Malevich also painted symbols and text characters onto the canvas—segments of the words "partial" and "solar eclipse" are seen in Russian. Malevich had been influenced by Russian literary futurists and the inclusion of Russian text, text fragments, and puns can be seen in at least two of his canvases (Portrait of I. V. Kliun (Improved) and Aviator) painted before An Englishman in Moscow.

== Interpretation ==
The Tate Modern, where An Englishman in Moscow was exhibited in 2014, has described its meaning as:

"Russian futurism was a literary as much as an artistic movement, and its relentless creative experimentation thrived on the exchange of ideas between different artists and different disciplines. In July 1913 Malevich collaborated with the musician Mikhail Matyushin and the poet Aleksei Kruchenykh on a manifesto calling for the dissolution of language and the rejection of rational thought. Kruchenykh coined the word zaum – meaning ‘beyond reason’ – to describe a new language of sounds without meaning.

At a Knave of Diamonds debate in February 1914, wearing a wooden spoon in his buttonhole, Malevich declared his renunciation of reason. The wooden spoon also appeared in the painting An Englishman in Moscow 1914, which resembles an absurdist collage of unrelated objects at different scales – such as the white fish that dwarfs a medieval church – alongside fragments of text. The picture suggests the elements of a complex riddle without a solution."

Narrating a short documentary film about the painting, art critic Edwin Mullins proposed an alternative interpretation, suggesting the canvas is telling the story of an Englishman's journey through Moscow and it depicts:

"...What the artist imagines such an Englishman might notice about the city in these days when the Russian Revolution is already threatening, curious, unrelated things that come together in his mind like a scrapbook or collage."

Regarding the text on the canvas, the art history book The Challenge of the Avant-Garde argued that, "Russian futurism in the visual arts was closely linked to literary experimentation. Kazimir Malevich drew on both Cubist visual devices and contemporary Russian poetry to disrupt conventions of meaning in so-called Cubo-Futurist paintings like An Englishman in Moscow."

== Influence ==
An Englishman in Moscow is considered a precursor to the Surrealism movement. Reviewing the 2014 Malevich exhibit at the Tate Modern, The Evening Standard said the painting is, "anti-rational forerunner of surrealism, colliding cubist fragments with apparently random objects."

== See also ==
- Cubism
- Russian Futurism
- Collage and modernism
- 100 Great Paintings, 1980 BBC series
