= 100 Great Paintings =

1980 British television series

- Created by: Edwin Mullins
- Country of origin: United Kingdom
- Original language: English

Original release
- Network: BBC Two
- Release: 1980 – 1982

100 Great Paintings is a British television series broadcast in 1980 on BBC Two, devised by Edwin Mullins. He chose 20 thematic groups, such as war, the Adoration, the language of colour, the hunt, and bathing, picking five paintings from each. The selection ranges from 12th-century China through the 1950s, with an emphasis on European paintings. He deliberately avoided especially famous paintings, such as Leonardo da Vinci's Mona Lisa or John Constable's The Hay Wain. The series is available on VHS and DVD.

On the basis of the series, Mullins published the book Great Paintings: Fifty Masterpieces, Explored, Explained and Appreciated (1981), which contained the 50 paintings broadcast to that point. A German translation of Mullins' book appeared as 100 Meisterwerke in 1983. In 1985, a second volume came out, only in Germany, which discussed the remaining 50 paintings.

From 1980 through 1994, the West German broadcaster WDR produced a television series called 1000 Meisterwerke (originally named 100 Meisterwerke aus den großen Museen der Welt; "100 Masterworks from the Great Museums of the World"), which was broadcast by ARD, ORF and BR. In each of the 10-minute broadcasts, a single painting was presented and analyzed by an art historian. The Sunday evening broadcasts had five million viewers.

== Selection of works presented ==
The following is a complete list of the 100 Great Paintings.

Artwork	Artist	Title	Year	Medium	Dimensions	Location	Notes
	Josef Albers	Homage to the Square: Against Deep Blue	1955	Oil on masonite	61 x 61 cm	Harvard Art Museums, Cambridge, Massachusetts	
	Albrecht Altdorfer	The Battle of Alexander at Issus	1528–29	Oil painting on panel	158.4 cm × 120.3 cm	Alte Pinakothek, Munich	
	Giuseppe Arcimboldo	The Four Elements: Fire	1566	Oil on Limewood	66.5 cm x 51 cm	Kunsthistorisches Museum, Vienna	
	Hendrick Avercamp	Winter Scene on a Canal	1630	Oil on panel	49.9 cm x 95.6	Toledo Museum of Art, Toledo, Ohio	
	Francis Bacon	Three Studies for Figures at the Base of a Crucifixion	1944	Oil paint and plaster on fiber board	94 cm x 74 cm	Tate Britain, London	
	Hans Baldung Grien	Death and the Maiden (Baldung)	1517	Tempra on lime wood	30.3 cm × 14.7 cm (11.9 in× 5.8 in)	Kunstmuseum Basel, Basel	

1. Josef Albers: Homage to the Square: Against Deep Blue (1955)
2. Albrecht Altdorfer: The Battle of Alexander at Issus (1528–29)
3. Giuseppe Arcimboldo: Fire (1566)
4. Hendrick Avercamp: Winter Scene on a Canal (c. 1630)
5. Francis Bacon: Three Studies for Figures at the Base of a Crucifixion (1944)
6. Hans Baldung Grien: Death and the Maiden (1517)
7. Giacomo Balla: Abstract Speed + Sound (1913–14)
8. Georg Baselitz: Allegory of Art
9. Georg Baselitz: The Great Friends (1965)
10. Max Beckmann: Actors – Triptych (1941–42)
11. Giovanni Bellini: Prayer of Christ in the Garden of Gethsemane (c. 1465)
12. Frits Van den Berghe: Sunday (1924)
13. Umberto Boccioni: The Farewells (1911)
14. Arnold Böcklin: Spring Awakening (1880)
15. Pierre Bonnard: Backlit Nude (1908)
16. Hieronymus Bosch: The Garden of Earthly Delights (c. 1500)
17. Sandro Botticelli: The Birth of Venus (1478–1487)
18. François Boucher: The Blonde Odalisque (1751)
19. Georges Braque: The Female Musician (1917–1918)
20. Pieter Brueghel the Elder: Landscape with the Fall of Icarus (c. 1550)
21. Pieter Brueghel the Elder: The Triumph of Death
22. Pieter Brueghel the Elder: The Hunters in the Snow (Return of the Hunters) (1565)
23. Gustave Caillebotte: Parisian Street, Rainy Day (1877)
24. Antonio Canaletto: Return of the Bucintoro to the Molo on Ascension Day (1734)
25. Caravaggio: Supper at Emmaus (1596–1598)
26. Caravaggio: The Lute Player (c. 1596)
27. Vittore Carpaccio: Miracle of the Relic of the Cross at the Ponte di Rialto (1494)
28. Annibale Carracci: River Landscape (c. 1595)
29. Mary Cassatt: The Child's Bath (c. 1891)
30. Paul Cézanne: Mont Sainte-Victoire (1897)
31. Paul Cézanne: Bathers (c. 1900)
32. Marc Chagall: I and the Village (1911)
33. Jean Siméon Chardin: The Young Schoolmistress (before 1740)
34. Chinese: Clear Weather in the Valley (12th century)
35. John Constable: Salisbury Cathedral (1823)
36. Lovis Corinth: Self-portrait in Front of the Easel (1914)
37. Antonio da Correggio: Leda and the Swan (c. 1530)
38. Gustave Courbet: Breakfast at the Hunt (1858)
39. Lucas Cranach the Elder: Adam and Eve in Paradise (1531)
40. Salvador Dalí: The Burning Giraffe (1936)
41. Honoré Daumier: Ecce Homo (c. 1849–1852)
42. Jacques-Louis David: The Lictors Bring to Brutus the Bodies of His Sons (1789)
43. Edgar Degas: Woman in a Tub (1886)
44. Eugène Delacroix: The Massacre at Chios (1824)
45. Robert Delaunay: Eiffel Tower, Champs de Mars (1911)
46. Sonia Delaunay-Terk: Electric Prisms (1914)
47. Niklaus Manuel Deutsch: Pyramus and Thisbe (after 1523)
48. Otto Dix: Flanders (1934–1936)
49. Jean Dubuffet: Prosperous country (1944)
50. Duccio: Christ Healing a Blind Man (1308–1310)
51. Marcel Duchamp: Sad Young Man in a Train (1911)
52. Albrecht Dürer: Picture of a Young Venetian Woman (1505)
53. Albrecht Dürer: Self-portrait (1498)
54. Anthony van Dyck: Samson and Delilah (c. 1628–1630)
55. Thomas Eakins: Max Schmitt in a Single Scull (1871)
56. James Ensor: Self-portrait with Masks (1899)
57. Max Ernst: The Attirement of the Bride (1939)
58. Jan van Eyck: The Madonna of the Chancellor Rolin (1434)
59. Lyonel Feininger: Bird Cloud (1926)
60. Lucio Fontana: Concetto Spaziale (1957)
61. Piero della Francesca: Resurrection of Christ (c. 1460)
62. Piero della Francesca: The Nativity (around 1480)
63. Helen Frankenthaler: Mountains and Sea (1952)
64. Caspar David Friedrich: The Sea of Ice (1822–1824)
65. Henry Fuseli: Titania Caressing Bottom with a Donkey's Head (1793)
66. Thomas Gainsborough: Mr and Mrs Andrews (1748–1749)
67. Paul Gauguin: Mahana no atua (Day of the God) (1894)
68. Théodore Géricault: The Raft of the Medusa (1819)
69. Alberto Giacometti: Portrait of Jean Genet (1955)
70. Giorgione: Sleeping Venus (1508)
71. Giorgione or Titian: Pastoral Concert (c. 1510)
72. Giotto: The Mourning of Christ (c. 1304–1306)
73. Hugo van der Goes: Adoration of the Kings (around 1470)
74. Vincent van Gogh: Self-portrait (1889)
75. Vincent van Gogh: Café Terrace at Night (1888)
76. Arshile Gorky: One Year the Milkweed (1944)
77. Francisco de Goya: The Colossus (attribution uncertain)
78. Francisco de Goya: The Naked Maja (c. 1800)
79. Francisco de Goya: Carnival Scene (1793)
80. Benozzo Gozzoli: The Procession of the Magi (c. 1460)
81. Gotthard Graubner: Black Skin (1969)
82. El Greco: The Burial of the Count of Orgaz (1586)
83. El Greco: View of Toledo (1600–1610)
84. Juan Gris: The Breakfast Table (1915)
85. George Grosz: Untitled (1920)
86. Matthias Grünewald: Crucifixion from the Isenheim Altarpiece (1515)
87. Erich Heckel: Convalescing Woman (1912–1913)
88. Hannah Höch: Cut with the Kitchen Knife (1919–1920)
89. Ferdinand Hodler: Youth Admired by the Woman (1903)
90. Hans Holbein the Younger: Portrait of the Artist's Family (Holbein) (1528)
91. Winslow Homer: The Fox Hunt (1893)
92. Edward Hopper: Nighthawks (1942)
93. William Holman Hunt: The Hireling Shepherd (1851)
94. Jean Auguste Dominique Ingres: The Turkish Bath (1862)
95. Johannes Itten: The Encounter (1916)
96. Geertgen tot Sint Jans: John the Baptist in the Wilderness (c. 1485–1490)
97. Alexej von Jawlensky: Meditation (1918)
98. Jasper Johns: Flag (1954–1955)
99. Wassily Kandinsky: Improvisation 6 (1910)
100. Kangra School: Radha and Krishna in the Garden (c. 1780)
101. Wilhelm von Kaulbach: Titus Destroying Jerusalem (1846)
102. Fernand Khnopff: Caress of the Sphinx (1896)
103. Ernst Ludwig Kirchner: Five Women on the Street (1913)
104. Konrad Klapheck: The War (1965)
105. Paul Klee: Bird Garden (1924)
106. Franz Kline: C & O (1958)
107. Wilhelm von Kobell: The Siege of Kosel (1808)
108. Oskar Kokoschka: The Bride of the Wind (1914)
109. Jan Kupecky: Portrait of the Miniaturist Karl Bruni (1709)
110. Fernand Léger: The Wedding (1911)
111. Wilhelm Leibl: Three Women in Church (1878–1882)
112. Franz von Lenbach: Franz von Lenbach with Wife and Daughters (1903)
113. Roy Lichtenstein: Girl with Hair Band (1965)
114. Max Liebermann: Women Mending Nets (1887–1889)
115. Richard Lindner: The Meeting (1953)
116. Stefan Lochner: Madonna of the Rose Bower (c. 1448)
117. Lorenzo Lotto: The Sleeping Child Jesus with the Madonna, Saint Joseph and Saint Catherine of Alexandria (c. 1533)
118. Morris Louis: Beta-Kappa (1961)
119. August Macke: Woman with Umbrella in Front of a Hat Shop (1914)
120. René Magritte: The Empire of Light (1954)
121. Kazimir Malevich: An Englishman in Moscow (1914)
122. Édouard Manet: Olympia (1863)
123. Andrea Mantegna: The Crucifixion (1457–1460)
124. Franz Marc: The Tiger (1912)
125. Hans von Marées: Golden Age (1879–1885)
126. Reginald Marsh: Twenty Cent Movie (1936)
127. Masaccio: The Tribute Money (c. 1425)
128. Jan Matsys: Flora (1559)
129. Henri Matisse: Bather at the River (1916–1917)
130. Henri Matisse: Blue Nude (1907)
131. William McTaggart: The Storm (1890)
132. Hans Memling: Saint John Altarpiece (before 1494)
133. Adolph von Menzel: The Flute Concert (1850–1852)
134. Jean Metzinger: The Racing Cyclist (1914)
135. John Everett Millais: Ophelia (1851–1852)
136. Joan Miró: Dutch Interior I (1928)
137. László Moholy-Nagy: LIS (1922)
138. Claude Monet: Women in the Garden (1866)
139. Piet Mondrian: Apple Tree in Bloom (1912)
140. Edvard Munch: Ashes (1894–95)
141. Edvard Munch: Four Girls on the Bridge (1905)
142. Gabriele Münter: Village Street in Winter (1911)
143. Bartolomé Esteban Murillo: Rest on the Flight into Egypt (c.1665)
144. Louis or Antoine Le Nain: Peasant Family in an Interior (1640–1645)
145. Paul Nash: Dream Landscape (1936–1938)
146. Ernst Wilhelm Nay: Grauzug (1960)
147. Mikhail Nesterov: The Great Consecration (1897–98)
148. Emil Nolde: Saint Mary of Egypt (1912)
149. Georgia O'Keeffe: White Calico Flower (1931)
150. Richard Oelze: Daily Stress (1934)
151. Victor Pasmore: Inland Coastal Landscape (1950)
152. Joachim Patinir: The Baptism of Christ (c. 1515)
153. Constant Permeke: The Engaged Couple
154. Francis Picabia: Very Rare Picture of Earth (1915)
155. Pablo Picasso: Guernica (1937)
156. Pablo Picasso: La Vie (1903–1904)
157. Jackson Pollock: Autumn Rhythm (1950)
158. Nicolas Poussin: The Adoration of the Golden Calf (1635)
159. Nicolas Poussin: Sleeping Venus and Cupid (1630)
160. Henry Raeburn: Rev. Robert Walker Skating (1784)
161. Raphael: Madonna of the Meadow (1506)
162. Arnulf Rainer: Self-portrait Overpainted (1962–1963)
163. Rembrandt: The Jewish Bride (1666)
164. Rembrandt: Self-portrait as Paul (1661)
165. Auguste Renoir: Luncheon of the Boating Party (1880)
166. Ilya Repin: Reply of the Zaporozhian Cossacks to Sultan Mehmed IV of Turkey (1880–1891)
167. Sebastiano Ricci: Bathsheba at her Bath (c. 1720)
168. Hyacinthe Rigaud: Portrait of Louis XIV. (1701)
169. Hubert Robert: Design for the Arrangement of the Great Gallery of the Louvre des Louvre (1796)
170. Giulio Romano: Virgin and Child and the Young John (c. 1518)
171. Mark Rothko: Red, Brown and Black (1958)
172. Carl Rottmann: From the Greek Cycle (1838–1850)
173. Henri Rousseau: The Sleeping Gypsy (1897)
174. Peter Paul Rubens: Château de Steen with Hunter (c. 1635–1637)
175. Peter Paul Rubens: Mercury and Argus (1638)
176. Jacob Isaakszoon van Ruisdael: The Large Forest (c. 1655–1660)
177. Philipp Otto Runge: The Hülsenbeck Children (1805–1806)
178. Pieter Saenredam: Interior of Grote Kerk in Haarlem (1648)
179. Egon Schiele: Mother with Two Children (1915–1917)
180. Karl Friedrich Schinkel: Medieval City on a River (1815)
181. Oskar Schlemmer: Group on the Railings I (1931)
182. Kurt Schwitters: Merzbild 25A, Constellation (1920)
183. Georges Seurat: A Sunday Afternoon on the Island of La Grande Jatte (1884–1886)
184. Luca Signorelli: Portrait of a Man (c. 1500)
185. Tawaraya Sōtatsu: Waves at Matsushima (c. 1630)
186. Stanley Spencer: The Resurrection, Cookham (1924–1927)
187. Carl Spitzweg: The Poor Poet (1839)
188. George Stubbs: The Grosvenor Hunt (1762)
189. Franz von Stuck: Salome (1906)
190. Yves Tanguy: About Four o'clock in the Summer, the Hope (1929)
191. Giovanni Battista Tiepolo: Virtue and Nobility putting Ignorance to Flight (c. 1745)
192. Jacopo Tintoretto: Bacchus, with Ariadne Crowned by Venus (1576–77)
193. Titian: Bacchanals (1523–1526)
194. Titian: Diana and Callisto (1556–1559)
195. Georges de La Tour: The Dream of Saint Joseph (c. 1628–1645)
196. Georges de La Tour: The Fortune Teller (c. 1620–1621)
197. William Turner: The Burning of the Houses of Parliament (1834–1835)
198. William Turner: Venice, from the Porch of Madonna della Salute (1843)
199. Paolo Uccello: The Battle of San Romano (c. 1456)
200. Emilio Vedova: Picture of Time – Barrier (1951)
201. Diego Velázquez: Las Meninas (1656)
202. Diego Velázquez: Prince Balthasar Carlos (1635)
203. Diego Velázquez: The Surrender of Breda (1634)
204. Jan Vermeer: The Artist in his Atelier (c. 1670)
205. Jan Vermeer: View of Delft (c. 1660)
206. Paolo Veronese: The Wedding at Cana (1562–1563)
207. Élisabeth Vigée-Lebrun: Self-Portrait with Daughter (1789)
208. Leonardo da Vinci: The Virgin and Child with Saint Anne (c. 1510)
209. Wolf Vostell: Miss America (1968)
210. Andy Warhol: Texan, Portrait of Robert Rauschenberg (1963)
211. Antoine Watteau: Pilgrimage to Cythera (1717)
212. Rogier van der Weyden: Saint John Altarpiece (after 1450)
213. James McNeill Whistler: Nocturne in Black and Gold: The Falling Rocket (1877)
214. David Wilkie: William Bethune with Wife and Daughter (1804)
215. Fritz Winter: Composition in Blue (1953)
216. Konrad Witz: The Knights Abishai, Sibbecai and Benaiah bring King David Water (c. 1435)
217. Grant Wood: American Gothic (1930)
218. Joseph Wright of Derby: An Experiment on a Bird in the Air Pump (1767–1768)
219. Andrew Wyeth: Christina's World (1948)
220. Francisco de Zurbarán: Still Life with Lemons, Oranges and a Rose (1633)

== Literature ==
- Great Paintings: Fifty Masterpieces, Explored, Explained and Appreciated, Publ. Edwin Mullins, New York, St. Martin's Press, © BBC, Hardcover, 344 pp., 1981, ISBN 0-312-34636-0
- Hundert Meisterwerke aus den großen Museen der Welt, vgs, Cologne, Hardcover
  - Vol. 1, Publ. Edwin Mullins, translated by Wibke von Bonin, Authors: Anita Brookner, Milton Brown, Hugh Casson, Richard Cork, David Hockney, John R. Hale, John Jacob, Penelope Mason, George Melly, Edwin Mullins, David Piper, Robert Rosenblum, Alistair Smith, 344 pp., 1983, ISBN 3-8025-2161-7
  - Vol. 2, Publ. Wibke von Bonin, Authors: Anita Brookner, Milton Brown, Hugh Casson, Richard Cork, John R. Hale, John Jacob, George Melly, Edwin Mullins, David Piper, Philip Rawson, Robert Rosenblum, Alistair Smith, 336 pp., 1985, ISBN 3-8025-2165-X
  - Vol. 3, Publ. Wibke von Bonin, Authors: Friedrich Gross, Joachim Heusinger von Waldegg, Gisela Hoßmann, Konrad Klapheck, Helmut R. Leppien, Renate Liebenwein, Reinhart Lohmann, Karin von Maur, Günter Metken, Edwin Mullins, Karlheinz Nowald, Sigrun Paas, Werner Schmalenbach, Wieland Schmied, Marina Schneede, Uwe M. Schneede, Jürgen Schultze, Evelyn Weiss, Hermann Wiesler, Frank Günter Zehnder, 342 pp., 1987, ISBN 3-8025-2170-6
  - Vol. 4, Publ. Wibke von Bonin, Authors: Ursula Bode, Barbara Catoir, G. Jula Dech, Gisela Hoßmann, Wenzel Jacob, Thomas Kellein, Renate Liebenwein, Karin von Maur, Edwin Mullins, Karlheinz Nowald, Stefan Oswald, Marina Schneede, Uwe M. Schneede, Jürgen Schultze, Hermann Wiesler, 342 pp., 1988, ISBN 3-8025-2180-3
- Hundert Meisterwerke aus den großen Museen der Welt, DuMont creativ Video, Cologne, RM Arts, Munich, 50 minutes each, VHS, 1986
  - Part 1, Kunstsammlung Nordrhein-Westfalen Düsseldorf, Werner Schmalenbach, ISBN 3-7701-2043-4
  - Part 2, Staatliche Museen, Preußischer Kulturbesitz, Nationalgalerie Berlin, Karlheinz Nowald, ISBN 3-7701-2046-9
  - Part 3, Städtische Galerie im Lenbachhaus Munich, Jürgen Schultze, ISBN 3-7701-2049-3
  - Part 4, Wallraf-Richartz-Museum and Museum Ludwig Cologne, Frank Günter Zehnder, Evelyn Weiss, OCLC 84552969
  - Part 5, Staatliche Museen, Preußischer Kulturbesitz, Gemäldegalerie Berlin-Dahlem, Karlheinz Nowald, Hermann Wiesler, ISBN 3-7701-2055-8
  - Part 6, Hamburger Kunsthalle, Sigrun Paas, ISBN 3-7701-2058-2
  - Part 7, Bayerische Staatsgemäldesammlungen, Neue Pinakothek München, Hermann Wiesler, Gisela Hossmann, ISBN 3-7701-2061-2
