= Dutch Interiors =

Series of three paintings by Joan Miró

The Dutch interiors are a series of three paintings painted by Joan Miró in 1928, each inspired by Dutch Golden Age paintings of Dutch interiors. Dutch Interior I is a reinterpretation of the Lute Player by Hendrik Martenszoon Sorgh, Dutch Interior II is a reinterpretation of Children Teaching a Cat to Dance by Jan Steen, and Dutch Interior III is a reinterpretation of the Young woman at her toilet, also by Steen. They belong to a period of Miró which is called "assassination of painting". In the spring of 1928, during a trip to Belgium and Holland, Miró was impressed by the Dutch masters of the 17th century. After buying colorful postcards of some paintings he began his reinterpretations. The colors are the hues of the original paintings, but the intensity of the color is purely Miró. Thus, a green-gray gradient wall of Martensz Sorgh becomes a green apple in Miró.

== Dutch Interior I ==
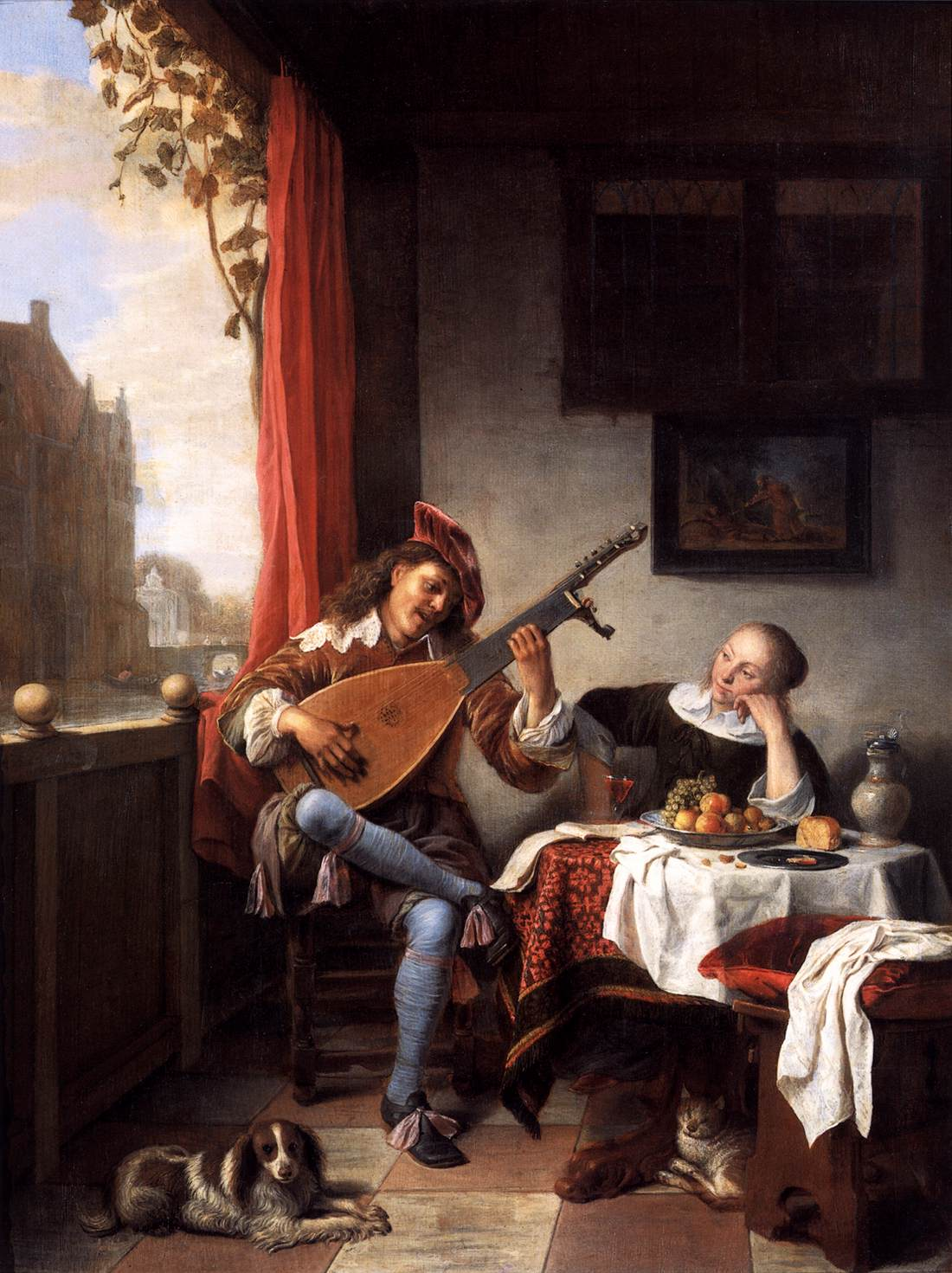
Interior I by Martensz Sorgh

- View Miró version

This painting presents a scene where the lute player stands in the centre. A woman besides him looks at the partiture, near a table. Under the table, a cat and a dog are playing. These domestic components contrast with the landscape of Amsterdam which is seen through a window.

It includes the same degree of detail shown in The Farm, with nowaday objects as the basket of the house. The huge size of the main elements, as the lute, corresponds to its importance in the scene and not to its real size or the proportions of the original picture. This ability to break the model by distorting the images (mainly sizes and shapes of the objects) is a key characteristic of Miró's style. It doesn't go never very far away from the Flemish model. As Miró reported "I had the postcard pinned up on my easel while I painted"

The colours belong to the same hue as in the original painting but with a greater intensity. They are pure and flat colours, not mixed ones, with special attention to green, white and brown.

== Dutch Interior II ==
- View Miró version

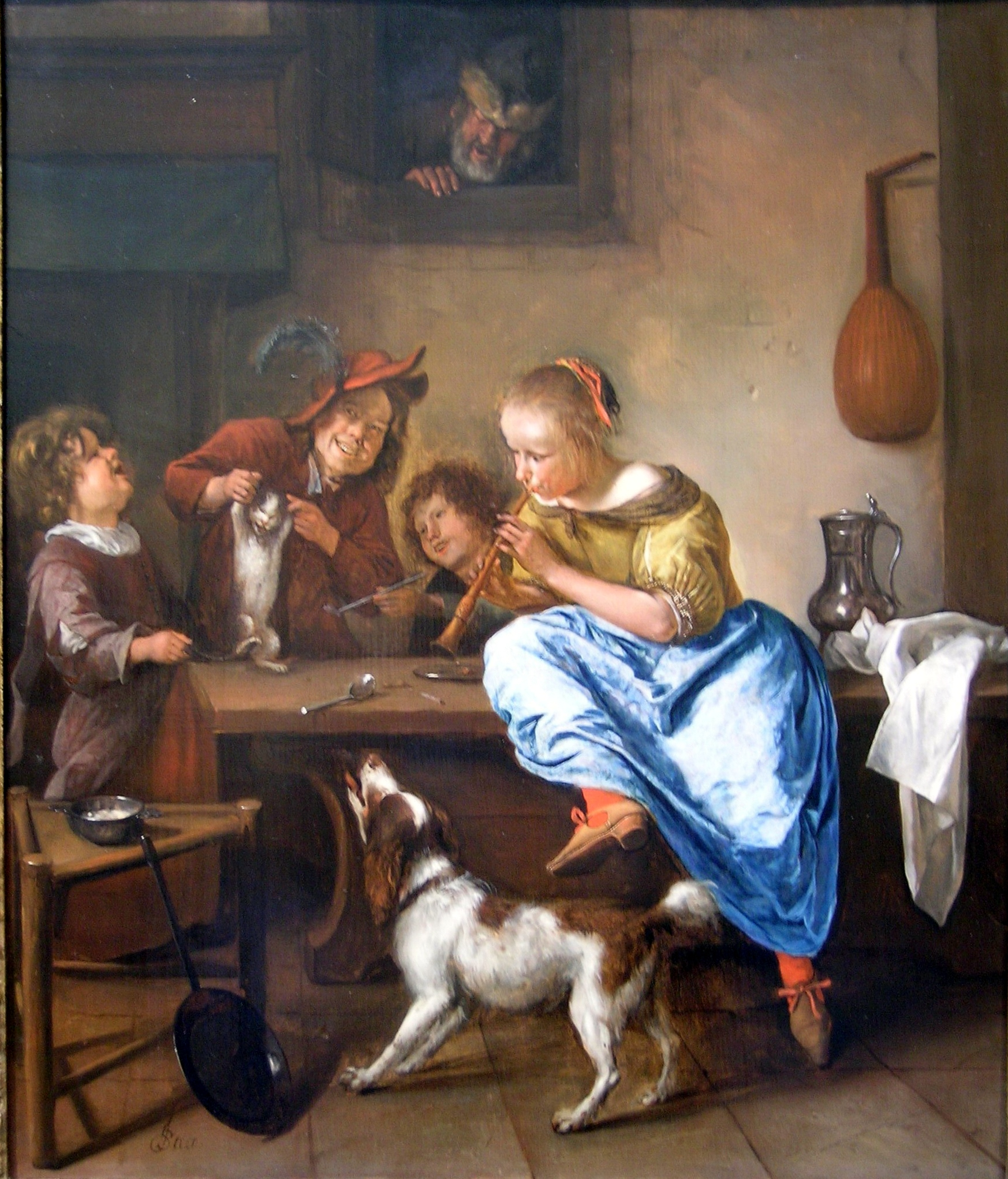
Interior II by Jan Steen

In this painting there are some repeated elements, like the dog and the cat, who dance with a group of children. The subject is not a description or a realistic work, but the music and the sound. Two red eyes are watching the scene and they foresee the fantasy touch of the third one, so the three paintings can be seen as a progressive series. Blue and brown are the main colours of the interior, while the cat serves as the spinning force of the whole composition.

It shows the aim of Miró to perform what it was called antipainting, influenced by Dada and Marcel Duchamp. When he takes a famous painting and transforms it, he is recognizing his debt with the model while he destroys it. At the same time Miró is questioning his own previous work.

== Dutch Interior III ==
- View Miró version

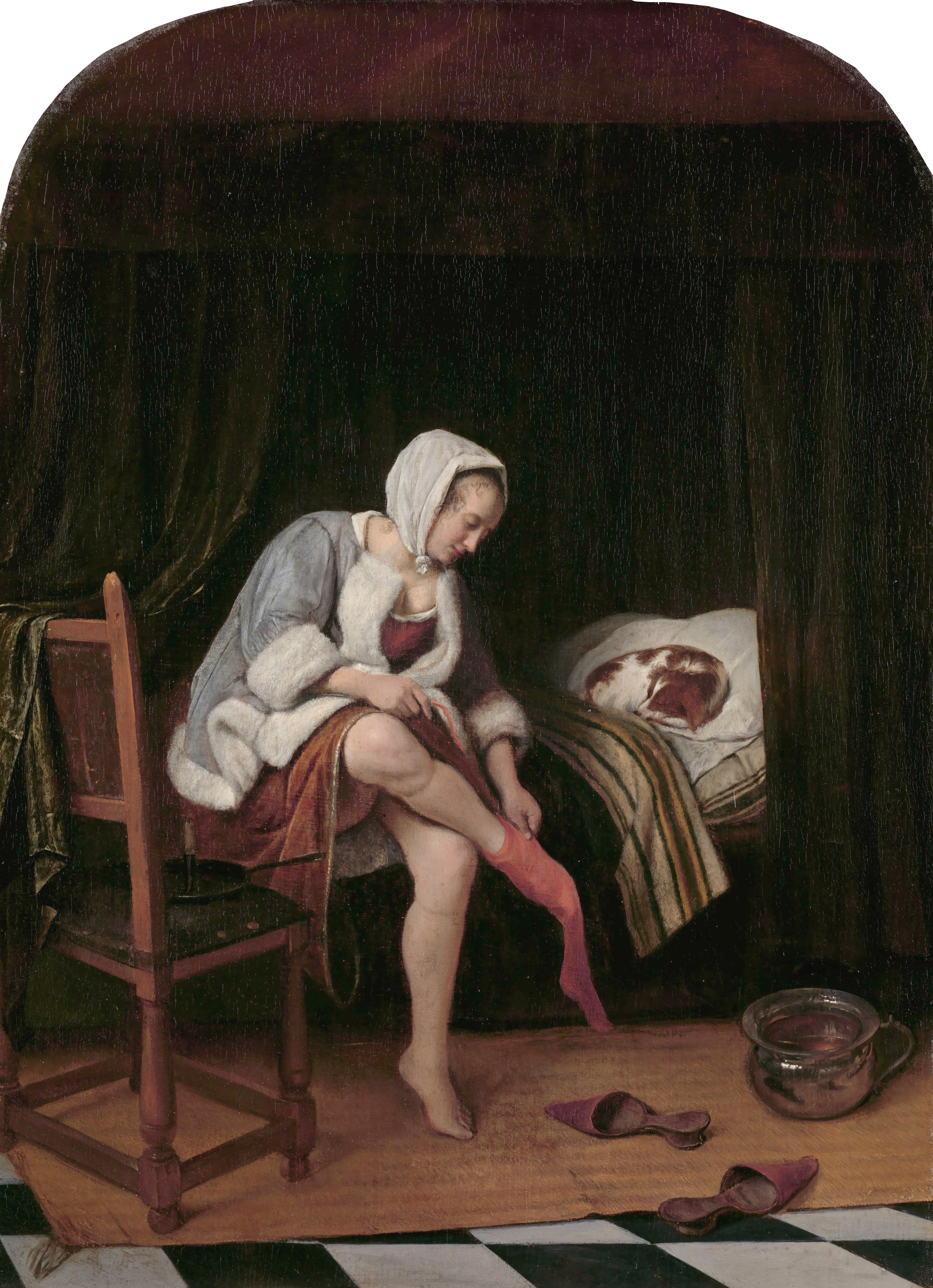
Interior III by Jan Steen

The third painting of the series differs from the other two because, despite being inspired by a domestic scene of a Flemish model, it changes the subject: the main character is a woman who isn't taking a bath but giving birth to a goat. This woman is impaled by a nail to the floor and is framed by a black line, one of the typical colours of Miró. The cruelty of the scene is softened by the stylization of the details, although the red of the blood makes it harder, attracting the attention of the viewer.

== See also ==
- 100 Great Paintings, 1980 BBC series
