= Mercury and Argus =

Mercury and Argus may refer to:

- Mercury and Argus (Jordaens), a c. 1620 painting by Jacob Jordaens
- Mercury and Argus (Rubens), a 1635–1638 painting by Peter Paul Rubens

== See also ==
- Argus Panoptes
