= Ariane in Naxos =

Painting by Le Nain brothers

- Bacchus and Ariadne
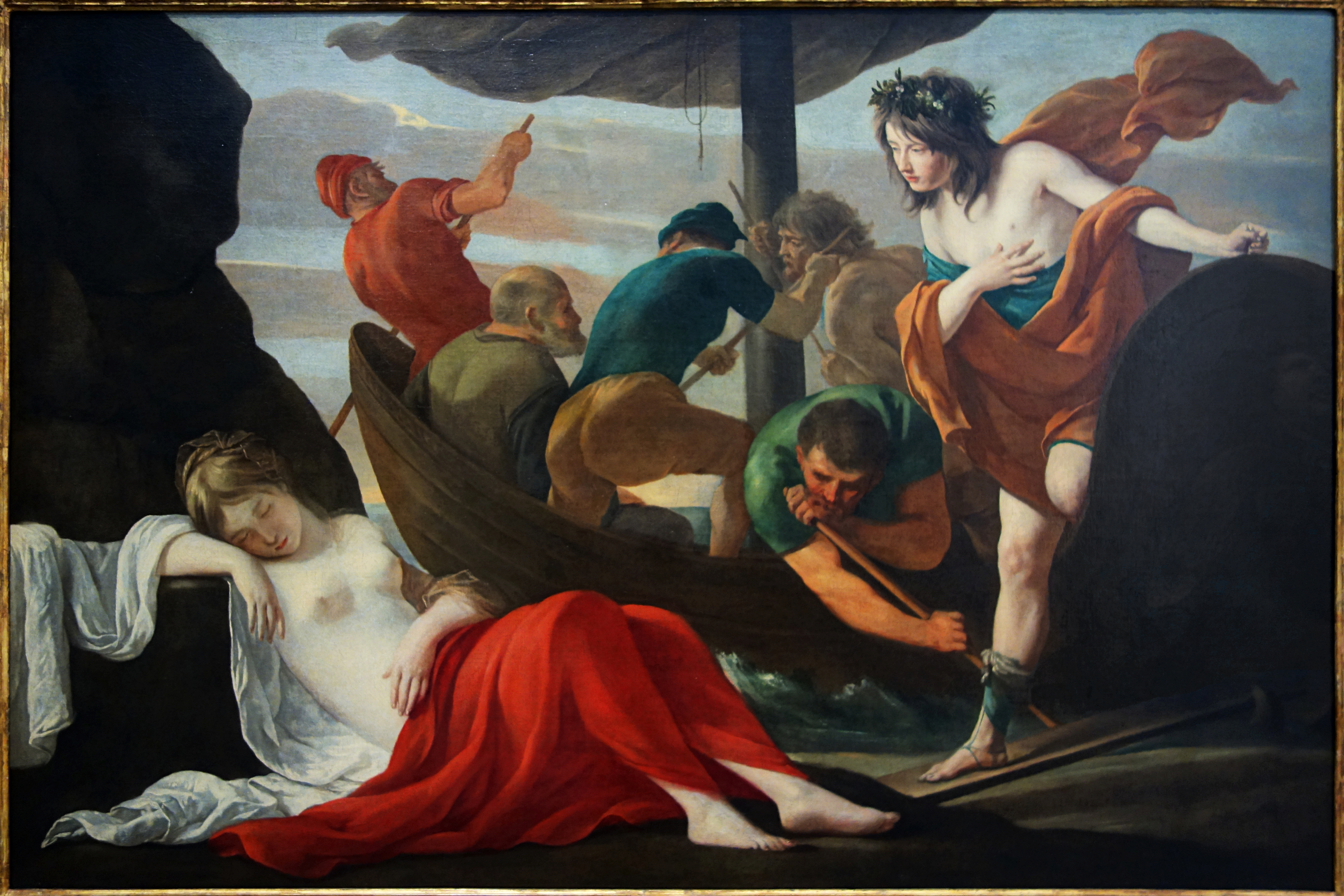
- Artist: Le Nain
- Year: c. 1635
- Medium: oil paint
- Dimensions: 102 cm (40 in) × 152 cm (60 in)
- Location: Musée des Beaux-Arts d'Orléans, France
- Identifiers: Joconde work ID: 00000093342

Ariadne in Naxos (also called Bacchus and Ariadne or Bacchus discovering Ariadne in Naxos) is a painting by the Le Nain brothers, dating approximately 1635, that is part of the collection of French paintings in Orléans's Fine Arts museum. It is a 102*152 cm oil on canvas.

The painting shows a young Bacchus discovering Ariadne on the island of Naxos, after she was abandoned by the Greek hero Theseus.

The painting was first attributed to Louis Le Nain, yet specialists still wonder if the author may not be Mathieu Le Nain.

The idyll between Bacchus and Ariadne has inspired works by many artists, including Titian, Leigh Hunt and Richard Strauss who wrote the opera Ariadne auf Naxos.
