= Sleeping Venus with Cupid =

Painting by Nicolas Poussin

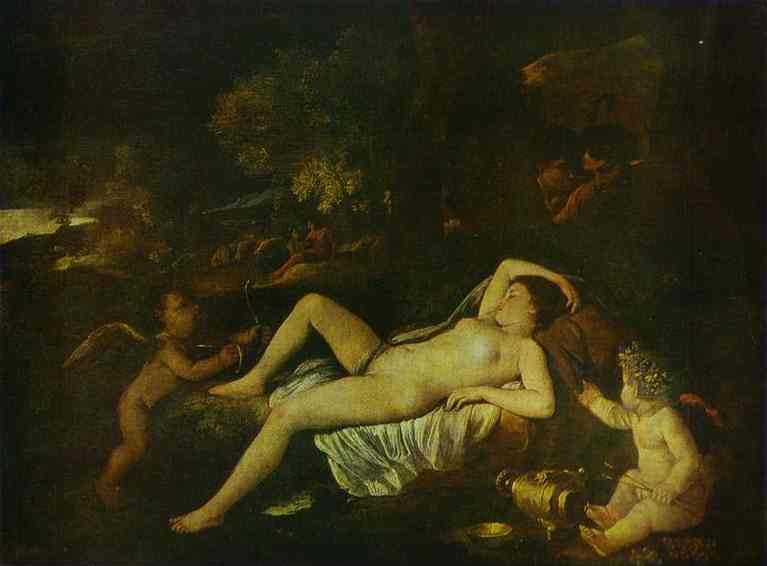
- Artist: Nicolas Poussin
- Year: 1630
- Medium: oil on canvas
- Dimensions: 73.3 cm × 98.8 cm (28.9 in × 38.9 in)
- Location: Gemäldegalerie Alte Meister, Dresden

Sleeping Venus with Cupid (or Sleeping Venus with Amor) is an oil on canvas painting by the French artist Nicolas Poussin. It was completed in 1630 and is now part of the collection of the Gemäldegalerie Alte Meister in Dresden.

The painting was featured in the 1980 BBC Two series 100 Great Paintings.

== History and description ==
It depicts a naked Venus, the Roman goddess of love, sleeping under trees accompanied at her feet by her son Cupid with his bow and arrow. A putto sits at her side clutching more arrows. The brightly painted body of Venus in the foreground is set against a darkly painted rural background, in which two men are gazing lustfully at her from behind a tree and a pair of lovers are in the middleground.

The painting was executed during Poussin's time in Rome and displays Venetian influence. The theme of a sleeping Venus was popular with Renaissance artists such as Giorgione and Carracci.

== See also ==
- List of paintings by Nicolas Poussin
- 100 Great Paintings
