= The Nativity (Piero della Francesca) =

Painting by Piero della Francesca

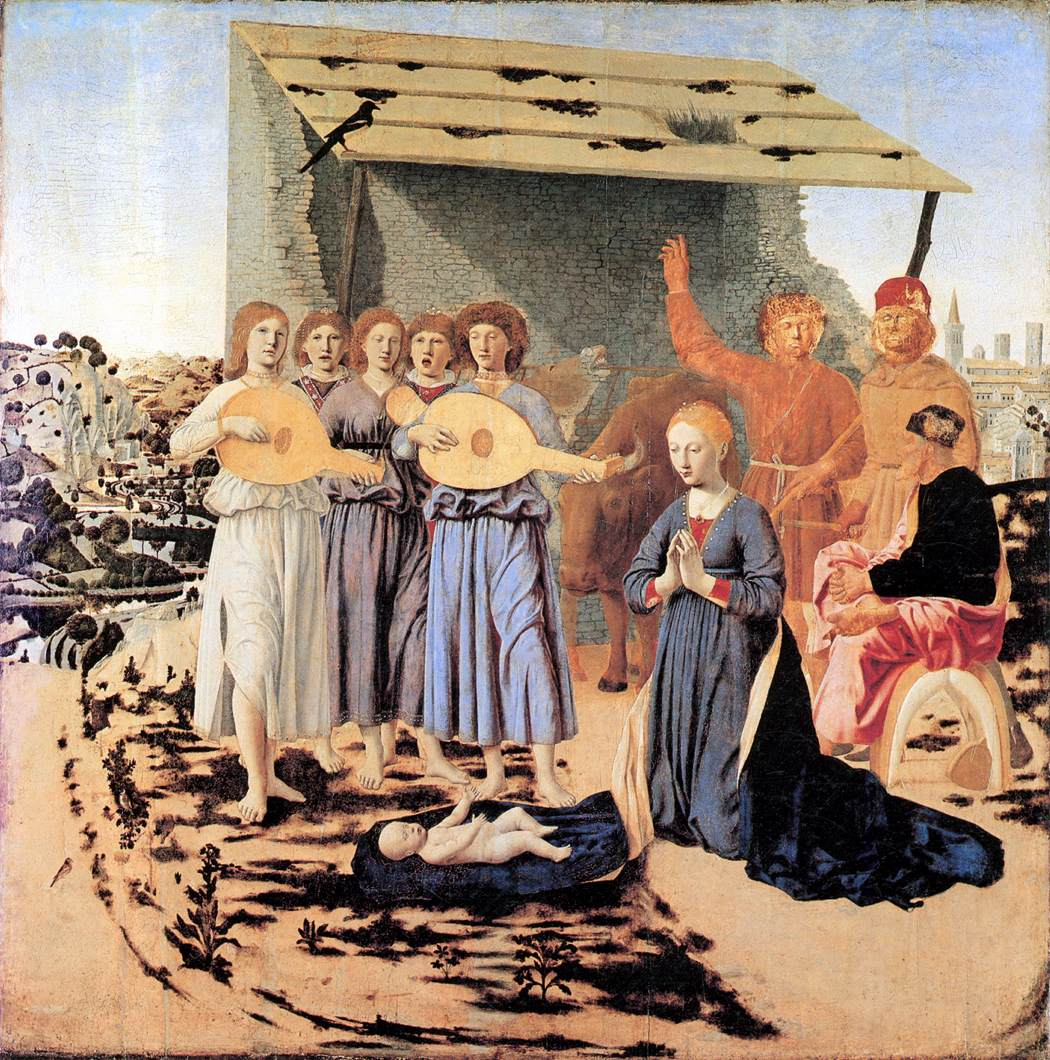
Piero della Francesca, The Nativity, 1470–75, National Gallery, London

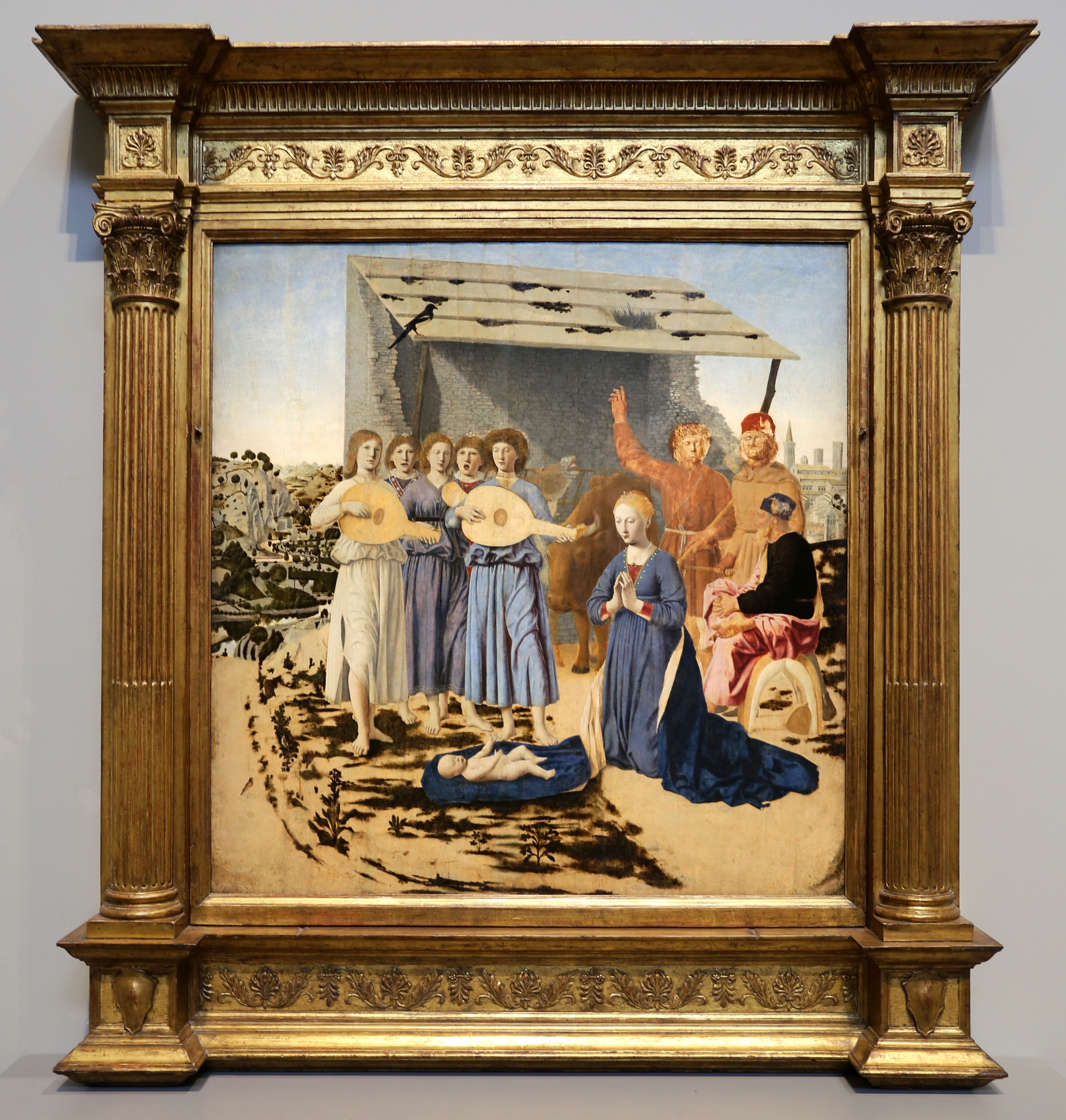
With its gilded frame

The Nativity is an oil painting on panel by Italian Renaissance artist Piero della Francesca, dated to 1470–75. The painting depicts a scene from the birth of Jesus, and is one of the latest surviving paintings made by the artist before his death in 1492. Held by the National Gallery in London, it measures 124.4 cm × 122.6 cm (49.0 in × 48.3 in). It is a popular image on Christmas cards.

This painting is part of the BBC's 100 Great Paintings.

== Description ==
The nativity scene has been translocated from Bethlehem to a clear summer day on a hill overlooking the Tuscan landscape, with a winding river to the left, and the urban landscape of a fortified town to the right, perhaps Piero della Francesca's birthplace of Borgo Sansepolcro. The painting was made for the artist's family palace in his home town, originally thought to be an altarpiece for a private chapel, but now understood to have been hung in the bedchamber.

In the centre is a ruined stone stable with sloping wooden roof, occupied by an ass and an ox. The dilapidated stable is painted at an awkwardly skewed angle on a rocky hilltop, perhaps intended to reflect the precarious circumstances of Jesus's birth.

In the foreground, the infant Jesus is lying naked on the folds of the Virgin Mary's blue cloak spread on the ground, reflecting a vision of Saint Bridget of Sweden from the 14th century, widely known in the 15th century. The Christ Child's arms are raised towards his serene mother, white-faced and light-haired, who is kneeling alongside, with her slender fingers steepled in prayer. She is wearing a blue gown with red cuffs and bodice, and a long blue cloak, with a light veil over her hair, and pearls in her hair and on her necklace.

To the right, Joseph is sitting with crossed legs on a donkey's saddle placed on the ground, in a pose recalling the Hellenistic Spinario bronze sculpture, prominently revealing the sole of his right foot to the viewer. Joseph is wearing a pink gown with black jacket and blue hat, and is speaking to two shepherds in plain brown clothes, one with a red hat. One shepherd is holding a staff and gesturing heavenward, while the other gazes upwards, perhaps towards a star (not visible).

The Holy Family are being serenaded by a group of five angels, standing like classical sculptures in long gowns to the left, two playing lutes and two others with open mouths as if singing. The scene includes other plants and birds, including a magpie on the roof of the stable, temporarily silenced from its incessant chattering, and a red-faced goldfinch, symbol of redemption or the passion, in a shrub to the left.

The work was previously displayed in a heavy gilded frame, with fluted pilasters and Corinthian capitals. It is now in a simpler 15th-century frame thought to resemble how it would have been framed in Sansepolcro.

== Condition ==
The painting was in poor condition. Once thought to be unfinished, it is now thought to have been damaged by over-enthusiastic restoration before it was acquired by the National Gallery. The pink clothes worn by Joseph were very thinly painted, underdrawing showed through the damaged shepherds' faces, and the braying ass in the stable was so translucent that the stones of the wall behind could be seen through its leg.

The painting underwent a three-year conservation project, and the restored painting went on display at the National Gallery in December 2022. The restoration was praised by Alison Cole in The Art Newspaper as giving the painting a "revelatory new dimension". However art critic Jonathan Jones harshly criticised the restoration in The Guardian, comparing it to Ecce Homo.

== Provenance ==
The painting remained in Sansepolcro until the end of the 19th century. It was bought by Alexander Barker in 1861 and brought to London. It was acquired by the National Gallery for £2,415 (2,300 guineas, equivalent to £298,000 in 2024) at the Barker sale at Christie's in June 1874, along with other works. The prime minister at the time, Benjamin Disraeli, defended the purchase of the painting in Parliament after concerns were raised about its condition.
