= 1000 Meisterwerke =

- Country of origin: West Germany

Original release
- Release: 1980 – 1984

1000 Meisterwerke (1000 Masterpieces) was a West German art series. It followed the highly successful British series 100 Great Paintings. From 1981 through 1994, the West German broadcaster WDR produced the series (originally aired from 1980 and named 100 Meisterwerke aus den großen Museen der Welt; "100 Masterworks from the Great Museums of the World"), which was broadcast by ARD, ORF and BR. In each of the 10-minute broadcasts, a single painting was presented and analyzed by an art historian. The Sunday evening broadcasts had five million viewers.

The Fine Arts Editor of WDR, Wibke von Bonin, developed the German version of the series. The series was produced by RM Arts, directed by Reiner E. Moritz, and narrated by Rudolf Jürgen Bartsch and the distinctive title melody was composed by Wilhelm Dieter Siebert. Each episode showed and discussed one painting, with other paintings of the artist and of other artists being drawn in for comparison.

The German or the English version of the series was shown in West Germany, the US, England, the Netherlands, South Africa, Austria, Scandinavia and Japan.

After the end of the original series, it was continued under the title, 1000 Meisterwerke, only in Germany. The concept was changed, so that instead of theme groups, several pictures from the same museum were now grouped into a series of broadcasts. The emphasis was on German museums at first, and in addition, European museums and individual international museums were considered. Painters who had already appeared in "100 Meisterwerke" were not included at first. Many times, the authors of the episode were also the curators in charge of the painting. Occasionally, the fixed framework of the series was deviated from, such as when several paintings were treated in a single broadcast in the "Greek cycle", or when the painter, Konrad Klapheck, wrote the script about his own painting, but using the third person.

In 1986, Bonin received the Goldene Kamera award for her work and video cassettes on seven German museums were produced (see section Literature).

The series ended in 1994, but without coming near to 1000 episodes. Today, the series is sporadically shown by 3sat, ARD-alpha and Classica (TV channel).

The series was subsequently dubbed into English and titled Masterworks, for international audiences.

== Parodies ==
The German comedy series, Stenkelfeld, parodied "100 Meisterwerke" several times. Episode titles included "Die Hochzeitszeitung" (The Wedding Newspaper), "Die Tischdecke" (The Tablecloth), "Deutscher Behördenschreibtisch" (German Office Desk) and "Deutscher Wohnwagen" (German Mobile Home).

In 1994 ORF produced, in the form of a regular episode of 1000 Meisterwerke, an ironic special called Das Testbild. It made TV test cards its subject: "Patrons are often at a loss in front of pictures like this one. Some will already have asked themselves silently if this really is art."

== See also ==
- List of German television series
