= Wibke von Bonin =

German art historian (born 1936)

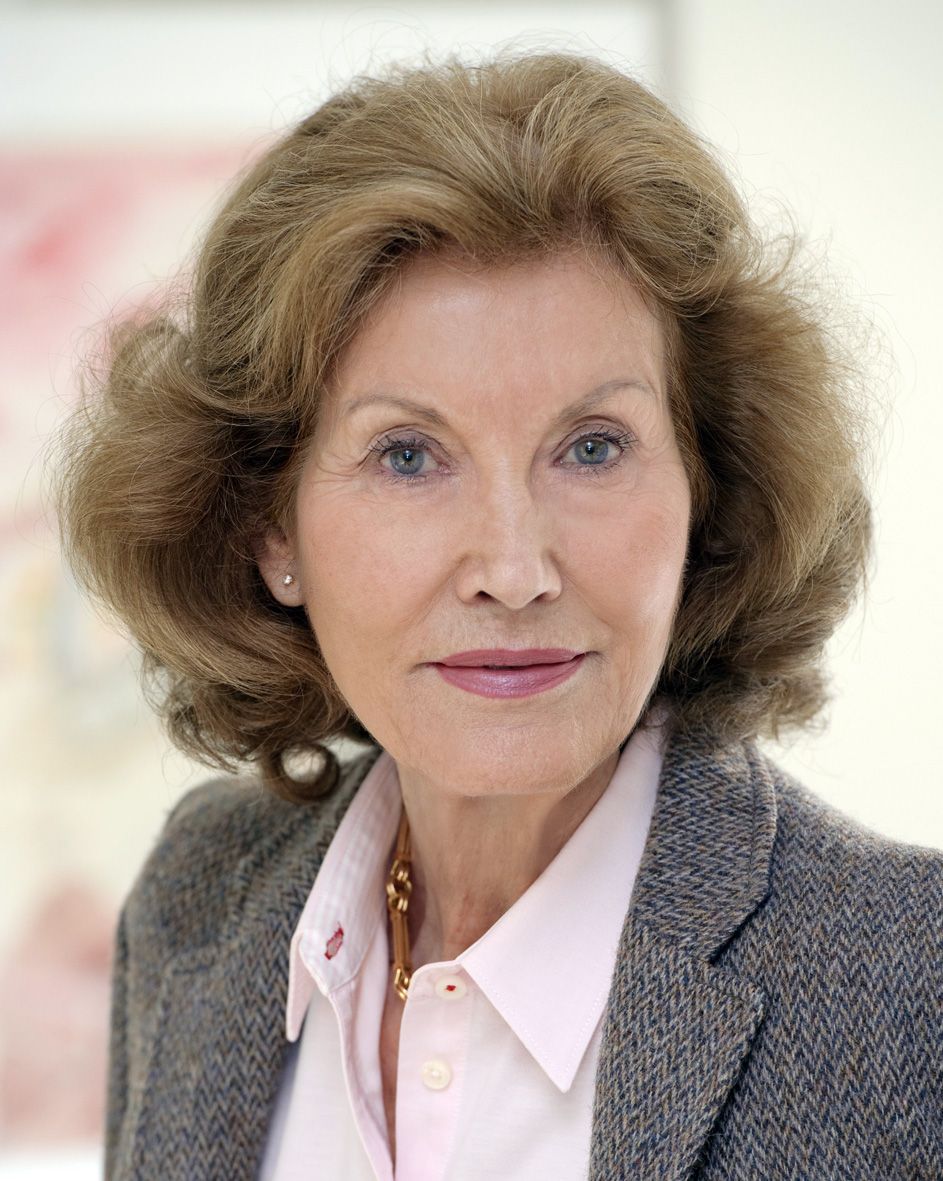
Von Bonin in 2012

Wibke von Bonin (born 1936) is a German art historian, cultural journalist and broadcaster.

She studied in Kiel, Paris and Berlin, and was a research assistant at the Staatliche Kunsthalle Baden-Baden before joining Westdeutscher Rundfunk in 1965, becoming its visual arts editor.

She won the award for a broadcast series (Senderreihe) in the Goldene Kamera 1985 (announced in February 1986) for her series Hundert Meisterwerke, the precursor of 1000 Meisterwerke.

In 2017 it was reported that at the age of 81 she was still active in giving lectures, sitting on juries, and promoting contemporary art.
