= Peasant Family in an Interior =

Painting by Louis Le Nain

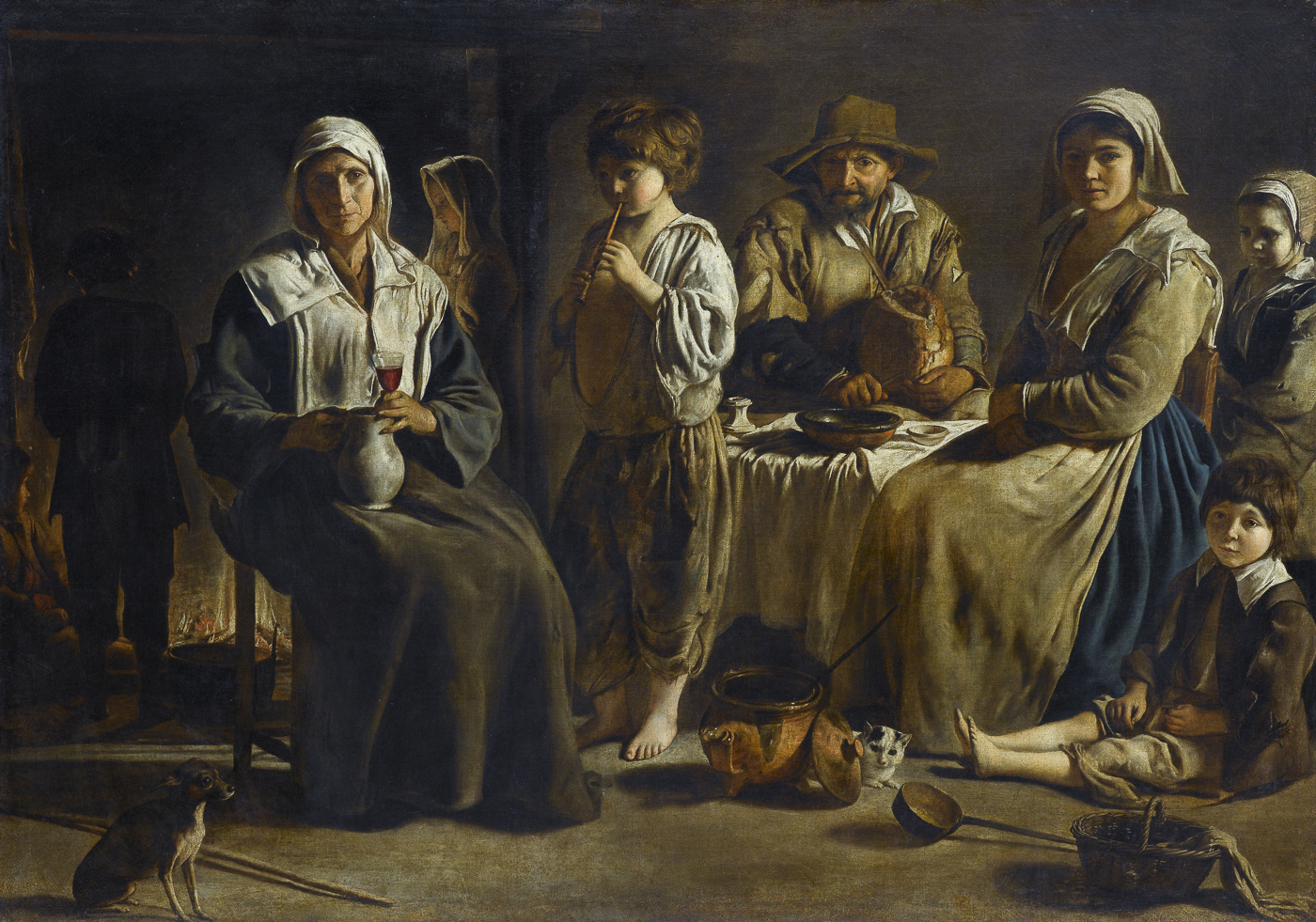
- Artist: Le Nain
- Year: c. 1642
- Medium: oil on canvas
- Dimensions: 113 cm × 159 cm (44 in × 63 in)
- Location: Musée du Louvre, Paris

Peasant Family in an Interior is a large oil painting executed c.1642 by one or more of the French Le Nain brothers, Louis or Antoine. It is in the collection of the Louvre.

The Le Nain brothers, Antoine Le Nain (c.1600–1648), Louis Le Nain (c.1603–1648), and Mathieu Le Nain (1607–1677) produced genre works, portraits and portrait miniatures in 17th-century France. Because of the similarity of their styles of painting and the fact that they signed their paintings only with their surnames they are commonly referred to collectively as Le Nain.

This particular genre painting depicts three generations of a peasant family relaxing by the fireside round a table in the evening. Light coming from a window illuminates their faces and the folds of their simple clothes. By virtue of its size, quality and character it is considered one of the Le Nain's masterpieces.

== See also ==
- 100 Great Paintings, 1980 BBC series

== External media ==
External videos
- Antoine or Louis Le Nain, Peasant Family in an Interior, Smarthistory
