= Edwin Mullins =

British art critic, novelist, and television presenter (1933–2024)

Edwin Brandt Mullins (14 September 1933 – 22 January 2024) was a British art critic, novelist, and television presenter. Among his books are a monograph on Georges Braque, ‘Swimming with Dali’ and ‘Van Gogh: The Asylum Year’. His television series include A Love Affair with Nature (Channel 4, 1985) and 100 Great Paintings.

Mullins lived in London with his wife, Anne. He had three children: Fran, Jason, and Selina; and five grandchildren: Ellie, Felix, Tegan, Zoë, and Freddie. Edwin Mullins died on 22 January 2024, at the age of 90.

== Works ==
- Braque, London, Thames & Hudson, 216 pp., 1968
- The Pilgrimage to Santiago, London, Secker & Warburg, 224 pp., 1974, ISBN 0-436-29510-5
- The Arts of Britain, Oxford, Phaidon, 288 pp., 1983, ISBN 0-7148-2285-X
- A Love Affair With Nature, Oxford, Phaidon, 160 pp., 1985, ISBN 0-7148-2404-6
- The Painted Witch: Female Body: Male Art: how Western artists have viewed the sexuality of women, London, Secker & Warburg, 230 pp., 1985, ISBN 0-436-29513-X
- Avignon of the Popes: City of Exiles. Oxford, Oxfordshire: Signal Books. 2007. ISBN 978-1-904955-33-7.
- The Camargue: Portrait of a Wilderness, Signal, 193 pp., 2009. ISBN 9781904955573
- Van Gogh: The Asylum Year, London, Unicorn, 192 pp.. 2015. ISBN 9781910065532
