= Self-Portrait with Julie (Self-Portrait à la Grecque) =

1789 by Elisabeth Louise Vigée Le Brun

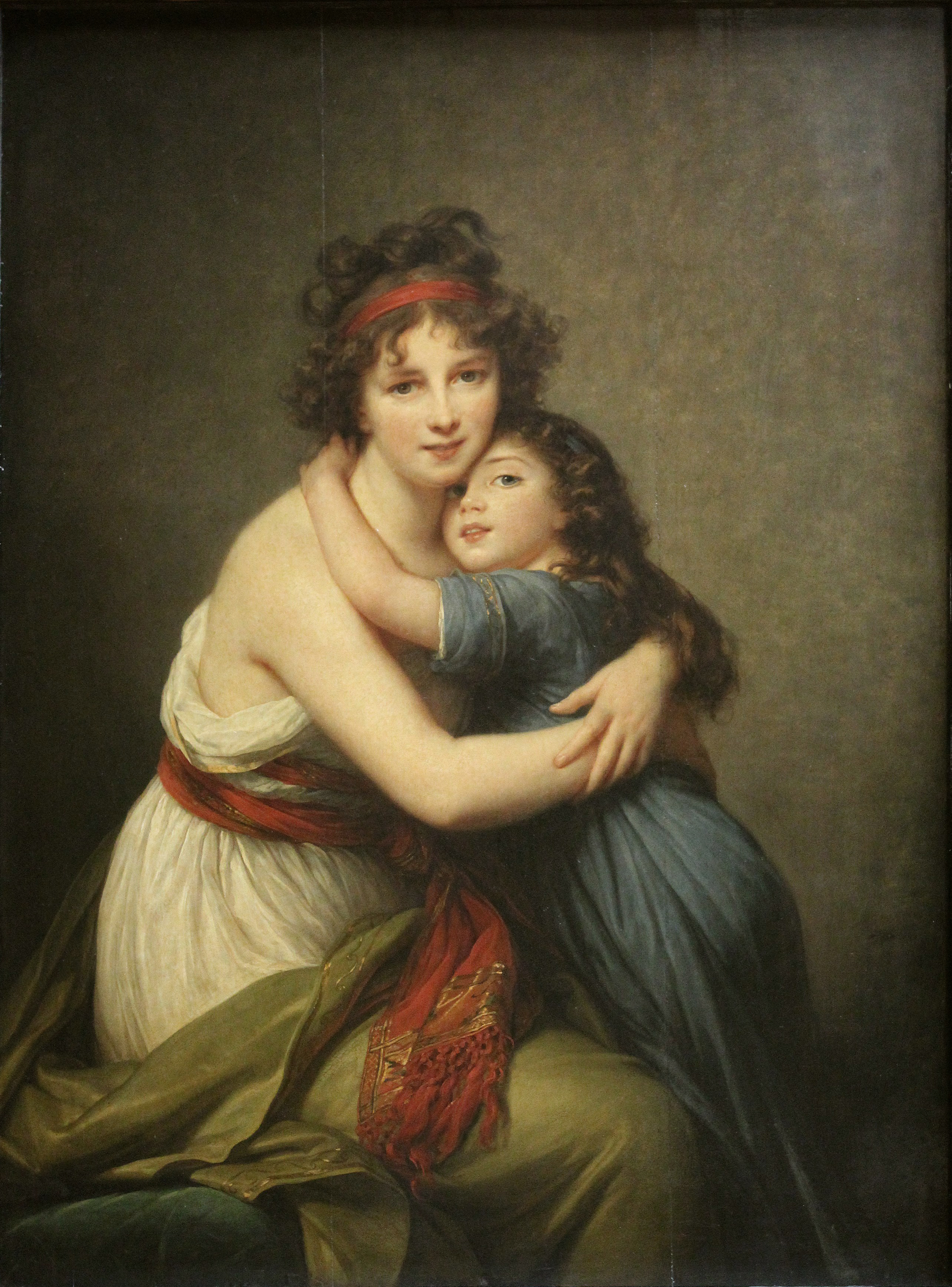
- Artist: Elisabeth Vigée Le Brun
- Year: 1789
- Medium: Oil on wood
- Dimensions: 130 cm × 94 cm (51 in × 37 in)
- Location: Louvre, Paris

Self-Portrait with Julie (Self-Portrait à la Grecque) is an oil-on-wood painting by Élisabeth Vigée Le Brun, created in 1789 at the height of the French Revolution, which depicts the artist in a tender embrace with her daughter, Julie. The painting reimagines the artist's 1787 Self-Portrait with Julie (Maternal Tenderness), clothing the figures instead in classical attire, aligning with the rise of Neoclassicism. The painting highlights Vigée Le Brun's technical skill, as well as her artistic identity and independence, especially at a time when art was a male-dominated field. The work is currently in the collection of the Louvre.

The painting was featured in the 1980 BBC Two series 100 Great Paintings.

== Description ==
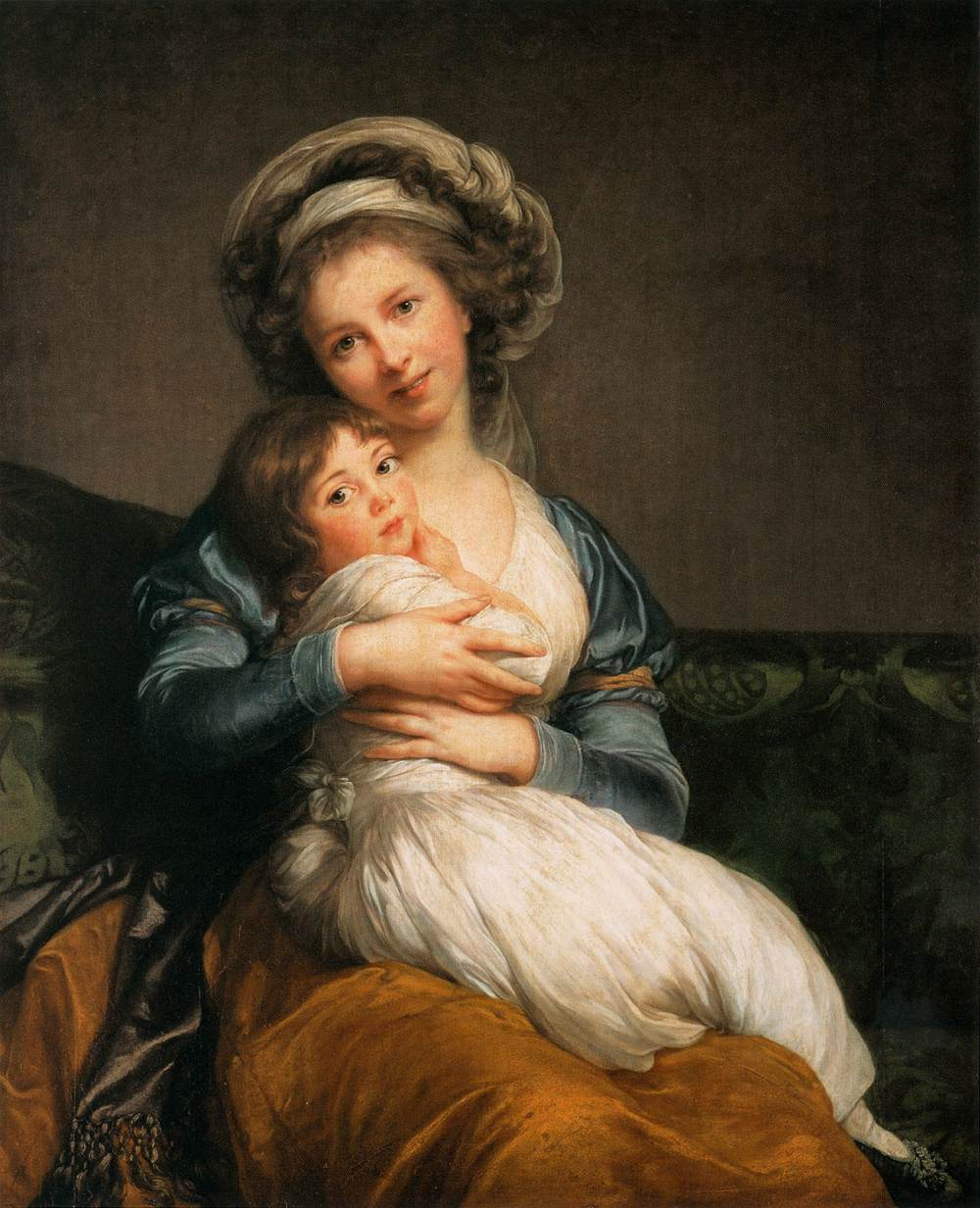
Elisabeth Vigée Le Brun, Self Portrait with her Daughter Julie (Maternal Tenderness), 1787

Unlike her previous self-portraits where she dons fashionable yet modest attire, here Vigée Le Brun is depicted in a loosely draped, classical style garment. The white cloth, evocative of ancient Greek or Roman dress, is wrapped over one shoulder and secured with a red scarf tied under her bust, while green silk is draped across her legs and her unpowdered hair is adorned with a red ribbon. The decision to dress this way carries layered meaning. Vigée Le Brun’s attire echoes the classical aesthetic that was increasingly popular during the late 18th century, aligning her image with timeless ideals of beauty and virtue. This was not merely a demonstration of her exceptional skill in rendering fabric but a deliberate move to elevate her artistic identity. By connecting herself to classical antiquity, Vigée Le Brun claims a space in the male-dominated tradition of "high art," which was often associated with history painting and classical themes.

== Background and context ==
Vigée Le Brun created Self-Portrait with Julie (Self-Portrait á la Grecque) in 1789, at the height of the French Revolution. Preceding the Revolution, images of motherhood were popular among the upper-class women who made up Vigée Le Brun's primary clientele. Many of the works that Vigée Le Brun made in this context showed an idealized image of the "good mother," in keeping with the social norms of the time.

Due to her close ties with the monarchy as the portraitist for Marie Antoinette, Vigée Le Brun faced exile in 1789 following the storming of the Bastille. Her citizenship was revoked, though it was restored less than a decade later. During her exile, Vigée Le Brun traveled with her daughter to Italy and painted in other locations throughout Europe until she returned to France in 1802, where she published her memoirs. Her work before and after the fall of the monarchy reflects the shifting of political sentiment in French society.

== Significance and techniques ==
=== Symbolism and imagery ===
Vigée Le Brun's painting has been interpreted by some art historians as challenging gender norms and demonstrating her strength and independence as a mother and artist. Through the creation of self-portraits, Vigée Le Brun was able to present herself as an artistic, skilled, and confident creator, challenging the male-dominated conception of what it meant to be an artist during her lifetime.

The painting contains an implicit tension. While it shows Vigée Le Brun in the role of the "good mother," it also offers a reminder that she was a mother who was dedicated to her art. The painting therefore suggests a balance between familial and professional obligations that tested gender norms of the period.

The direct gaze, along with her assertion as a self-sufficient woman, assures the viewer that Vigée Le Brun has autonomy over her identity as a mother and artist, thereby deserving of the respect and recognition that comes with these titles.

=== Related works ===
Vigée Le Brun often painted open-lipped smiles revealing teeth, which was considered unconventional and sometimes controversial. These smiles appeared in her works such as Madame Molé-Reymond and Emma Hart as Ariadne. This decision to have her subject smiling was part of a broader technique of engagement with the viewer, found throughout many of her portraits. The Comtesse Du Barry in a Straw Hat is another such example, where a visible smile and direct gaze contribute to directly drawing in the viewer. Vigée Le Brun did not capture violent passions in her paintings, but more so the everyday feelings part of the human experience.

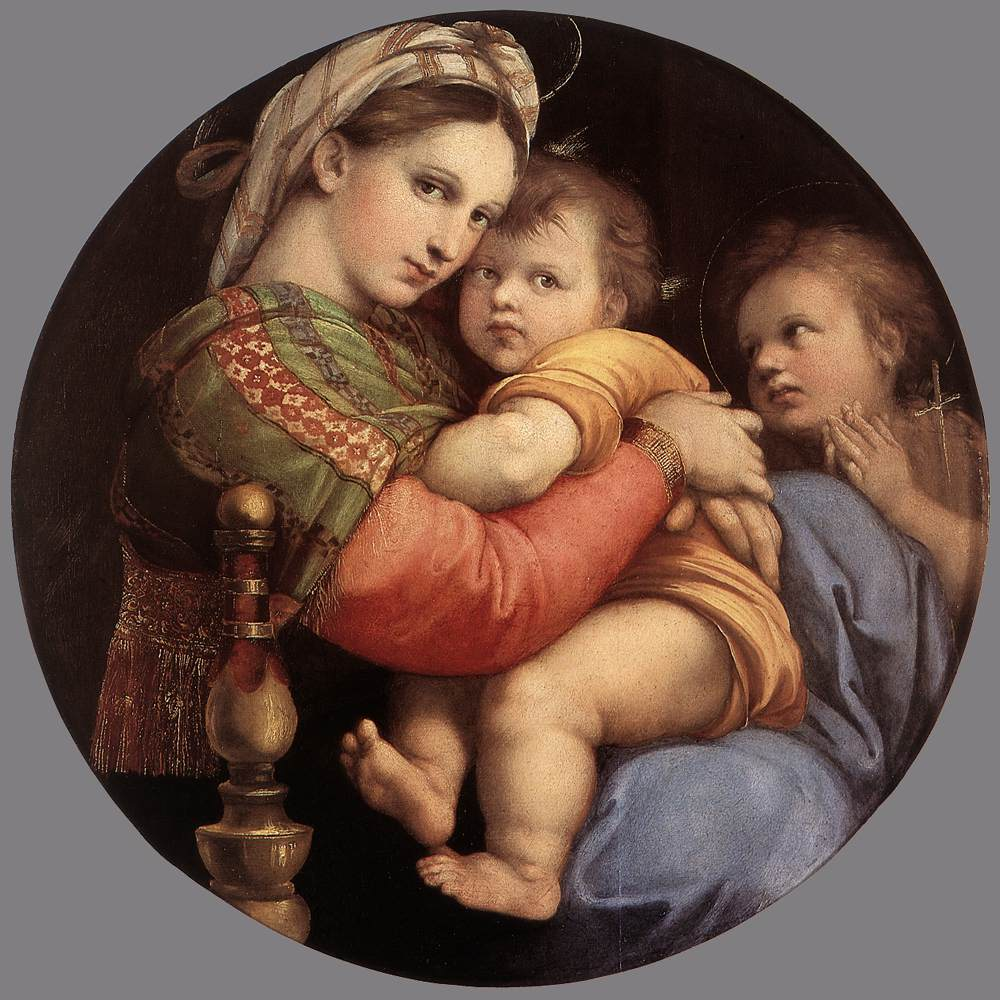
Raphael, Madonna della Sedia, ca. 1514

Raphael’s Madonna della Sedia has a similar subject and pose to Vigée Le Brun’s Self-Portrait with Julie (Self-Portrait à la Grecque). It depicts a mother holding her small child in a tightly cropped, circular composition that brings an intimate focus to the maternal bond. Like Vigée Le Brun’s portrait, Raphael’s Madonna della Sedia meets the viewer’s gaze, establishing a quiet connection between image and observer. However, while both works use eye contact to draw in the viewer, the emotional tone differs significantly. Raphael’s subjects maintain a restrained and contemplative expression, as if idealized and removed from the immediacy of personal affection. In contrast, Vigée Le Brun's portrait communicates warmth and vivacity—the artist smiles openly, and her daughter leans in closely, suggesting a genuine and joyful relationship. The result is a more dynamic and emotionally accessible portrayal of motherhood in Vigée Le Brun’s work. Moreover, Vigée Le Brun adapts Raphael’s composition but reclaims it through her own maternal identity, inserting herself into a tradition historically dominated by male artists. By doing so, she not only references the past but also challenges it, presenting the mother not as a passive vessel but as a creator of both art and life.
