= Bacchus, Venus and Ariadne (Tintoretto) =

Painting by Tintoretto

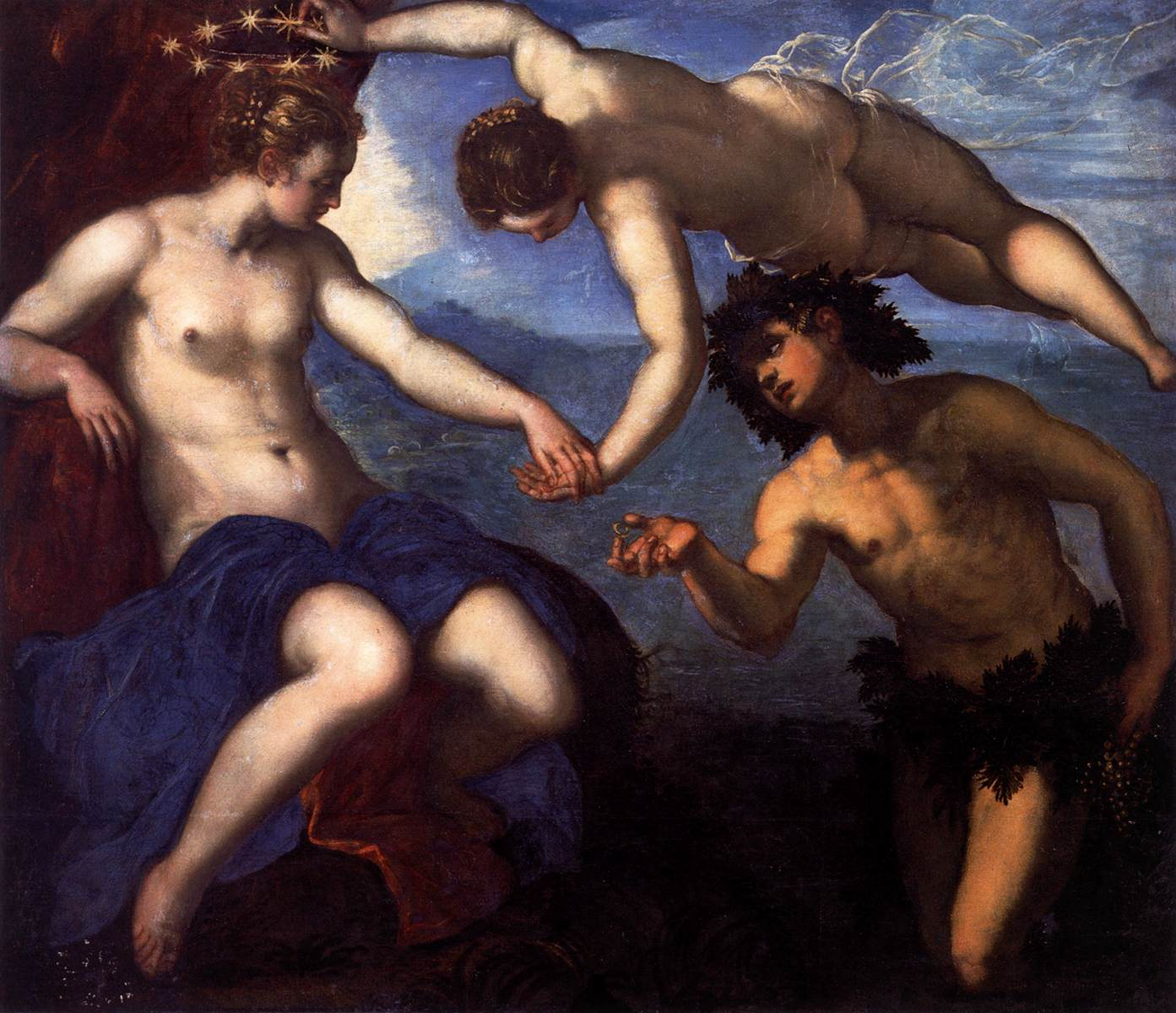
- Artist: Tintoretto
- Year: 1576–77
- Type: Oil on canvas
- Dimensions: 146 cm × 167 cm (57 in × 66 in)
- Location: Doge's Palace, Venice

Bacchus, Venus and Ariadne is an oil painting executed in Venice in 1576–77 by the Italian painter Jacopo Tintoretto which hangs in the Sala dell'Anticollegio at the Doge's Palace (the Pallazzo Ducale) in Venice. It is one of four almost square paintings on mythological subjects in the same room which were commissioned to celebrate the government of Doge Girolamo Priuli (1486–1567).

== Description ==
It depicts the god Bacchus (Greek: Dionysis) arriving from the sea with a wreath and a skirt of vine leaves, bearing a bunch of grapes and a marriage ring. Ariadne is extending her ring finger in anticipation as the goddess Venus crowns her with a crown of stars. Ariadne was a Cretan princess, half-sister of the Minotaur, who had eloped with Theseus after he had killed the Minotaur. Theseus subsequently abandoned her on the island of Naxos where she was discovered by Bacchus. Bacchus and Ariadne were married and Ariadne elevated to join the gods, immortalised as the constellation Corona Borealis.

Ariadne personified Venice, favoured by the gods and crowned in glory, the marriage representing the union of Venice with the sea.

== See also ==
- 100 Great Paintings, 1980 BBC series
