= Nude Against the Light =

Painting by Pierre Bonnard

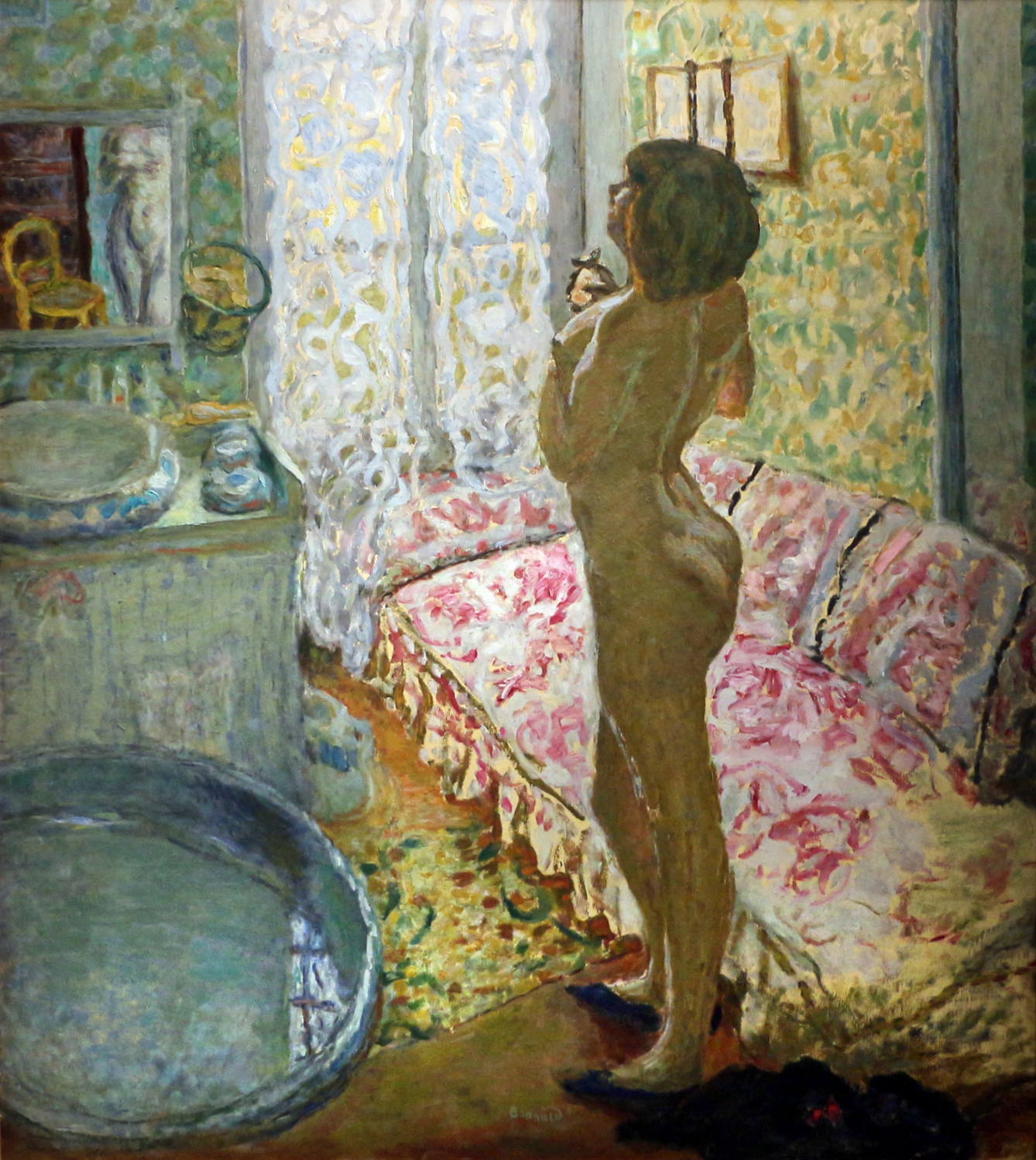
- Artist: Pierre Bonnard
- Year: 1908
- Medium: oil on canvas
- Dimensions: 124.5 cm × 109.2 cm (49.0 in × 43.0 in)
- Location: Royal Museums of Fine Arts of Belgium, Brussels

Nude Against the Light or Backlit Nude (French: Nu à contre-jour) is an oil-on-canvas painting by the French Post-Impressionist painter Pierre Bonnard, from 1908. It is now in the collection of the Royal Museums of Fine Arts of Belgium, in Brussels.

The work depicts the artist's partner and frequent model Marthe de Mėrigny applying eau de Cologne, after a bath in a tub. She is nude and standing silhouetted against the windows, which fills the room with bright, warm, shadowless light and color. The bather, Marthe de Mėrigny, is reflected in a mirror, a characteristic feature of Bonnard's paintings.

== See also ==
- 100 Great Paintings, 1980 BBC series
