= Ashes (Munch) =

Painting by Edvard Munch

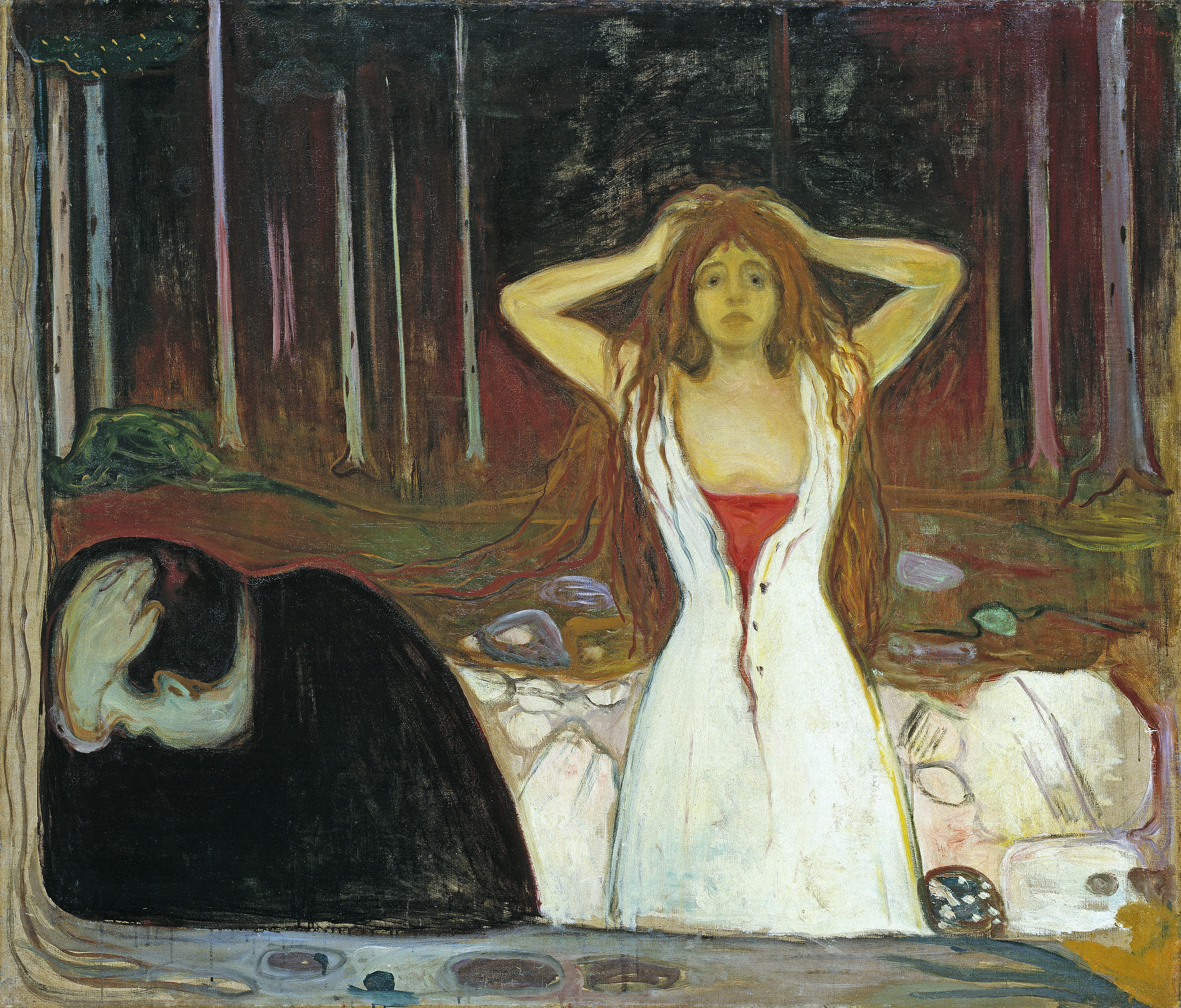
- Artist: Edvard Munch
- Year: 1894-1895
- Medium: oil on canvas
- Dimensions: 120.5 cm × 141 cm (47.4 in × 56 in)
- Location: National Gallery of Norway, Oslo

Ashes is an oil on canvas painting by the Norwegian symbolist painter Edvard Munch. Painted in 1894–95 it is now in the collection of the National Gallery of Norway in Oslo.

== History and description ==
The work depicts a critical scene in a lovemaking tryst between a couple in the forest, which has left the man hunched over in shame or dejection and the dishevelled woman wide-eyed and motionless in frustration or despair. The picture's title suggests that, for whatever reason, the heat of their passion had burnt out at that moment.

It is probably not insignificant that the scene was painted at a time when Munch himself was having a brief clandestine affair with Millie Thaulow, the wife of a cousin, during which they too would meet in the woods. In fact the artist wrote afterwards on a lithograph of the work "I felt our love lying on the earth like a heap of ash".

In 1925, at the age of 62, Munch produced a second more impressionistic version of the painting which hangs in Oslo's Munch Museum. If the incident portrayed in the painting was of a personal nature, it had clearly left its mark.

== See also ==
- List of paintings by Edvard Munch
- 100 Great Paintings, 1980 BBC series
