= At 4 O'Clock in the Summer, Hope =

1929 painting by Yves Tanguy

A quatre heures d'été, l'espoir... (At 4 O'Clock In The Summer, Hope)
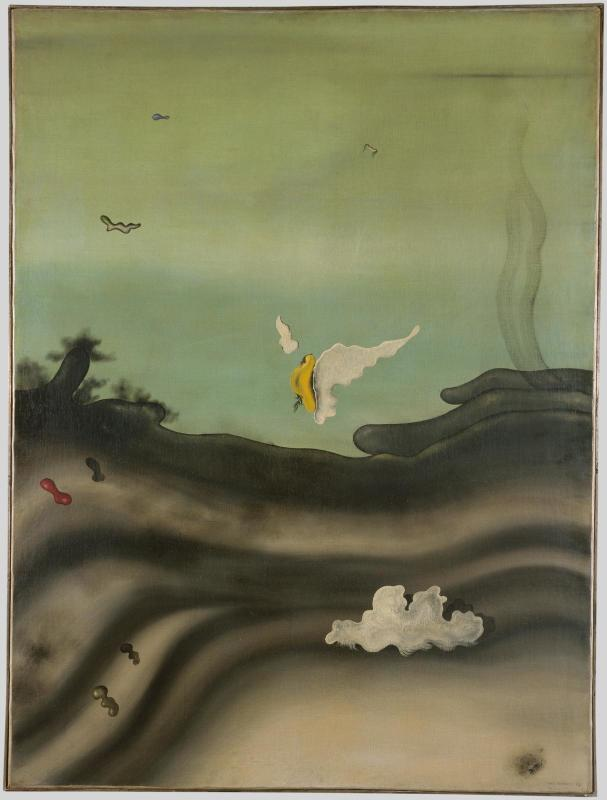
- Artist: Yves Tanguy
- Year: 1929
- Medium: Oil on canvas
- Movement: Surrealism
- Dimensions: 129.5 cm × 97 cm (51.0 in × 38 in)
- Location: Musée National d'Art Moderne; Paris, France

At 4 O'Clock In The Summer, Hope (French: A quatre heures d'été, l'espoir...), also known as About Four o'clock in the Summer, the Hope and At Four in the Summer, Hope, is a 1929 painting by French surrealist painter Yves Tanguy.

== Description ==
From the Masterworks series:

Tanguy presents us with a magical submarine world and its beyond. In the center hangs a pivotal being, a yellow-white shape of a bird half shell, each part distinct yet melting into the other, suggesting a possible metamorphosis ... When one looks closely at the painting's composition, it appears to be divided into an almost artificial geographic neatness. On the right side of the painting a stem like creatures drift toward the center, which only at second glance reveals itself to be a woman's form ... Tanguy so rarely included a woman in his paintings that her presence seems all the more significant.

Author David Clarke noted that the painting is one of a number of canvases by Tanguy that has ambiguous underwater ambiance.

== Influence ==
At 4 O'Clock In The Summer, Hope was the subject of a short documentary film, which ran as the 190th episode of the British television series 100 Great Paintings.

Author Laurie Wilson has argued that the title of Alberto Giaccometti's 1932 sculpture Palais de Quatres Heures (which is most often translated as Palace at 4 A.M.), is derived from the title of Tanguy's painting since Tanguy had influenced other works by Giacometti and because they had been friends since early 1930, when Tanguy moved into the same studio complex as Giacometti.
