= Mahana no atua =

1894 painting by Paul Gauguin

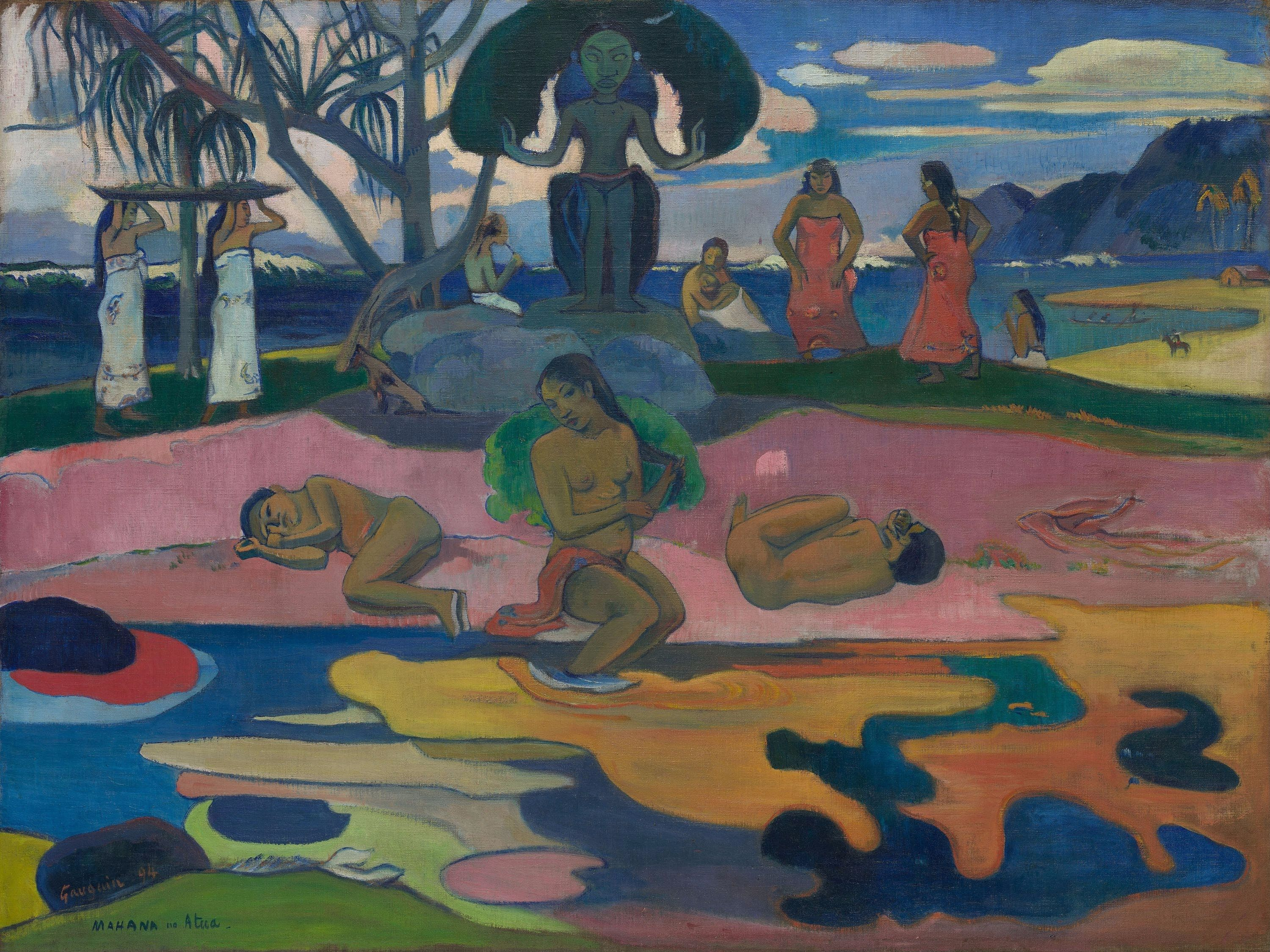
- Artist: Paul Gauguin
- Year: 1894
- Medium: oil on canvas
- Dimensions: 68 cm × 91 cm (27 in × 36 in)
- Location: Art Institute of Chicago, Chicago

Mahana no atua (English: Day of the God) is an 1894 oil painting by the French Post-Impressionist artist Paul Gauguin which is in the collection of the Art Institute of Chicago.

The painting was executed in Paris on Gauguin's return from his first period of living and working in Tahiti and is more imaginative than real. It depicts a central carved idol of the goddess Hina standing on a rock by the beach around which human figures are arranged in a symmetrical pattern. On the left two women are bearing votive offerings and on the right two others are dancing the upaupa, an erotic Tahitian dance which the colonial authorities tried to ban. In the foreground is an enigmatic group of three bathers, whose poses suggest they represent birth, life and death, but about which Gauguin never spoke.

In style the work is typical of the artist's Post-Impressionism in its simplification of forms and the dramatic use of color.

== See also ==
- 100 Great Paintings, 1980 BBC series
