= Reiner E. Moritz =

German film director and film producer (born 1938)

Reiner Eberhard Moritz (born 1938 in Hanover) is a German film director and film producer.

== Biography ==
Moritz studied musicology, German, and Romance studies. He graduated from LMU Munich in 1970. In 1977, he founded the RM Creative Fernseh- und Film-GmbH in Munich, which still exists today. In 1978, he founded the RM Arts Fernseh- und Film GmbH, which later passed to the Kirch Group and since 2005 has rights to some 900 productions owned by the Arthaus Musik label. RM Arts produced numerous documentaries in the field of music and visual arts.

In 1981, RM Arts started the series 1000 Meisterwerke for the WDR under the direction of Moritz. Moritz knew Dmitri Shostakovich and produced the documentary Ein Mann mit vielen Gesichtern ("A man with many faces") about him.

== Honours ==
- 2007: Honorary Preis der deutschen Schallplattenkritik.
- 2009: Knight's Cross 1st Class of the Order of the Lion of Finland.

== Filmography (selection) ==
=== As director ===
- 1981: 1000 Meisterwerke (series)
- 1991: Werner Tübke. About the adventure of figuration
- 2004: L'heure espagnole
- 2006: The Real Rameau
- 2014: Tanz macht Fernsehgeschichte

=== As producer ===
- 1972: Pink Floyd: Live at Pompeii
- 1978: Monsieur René Magritte
- 1984: Puccini
- 1992: Das Doppelleben des Arnold Bax ("The Double Life of Arnold Bax")
- 1998: In Rehearsal: Christoph von Dohnányi with the Philharmonia Orchestra
