= Spatial Concept (painting) =

Painting by Lucio Fontana

Spatial Concept (Italian – Concetto Spaziale) is a c. 1965 painting by the Argentine-Italian painter Lucio Fontana. It is now in the Royal Museum of Fine Arts, Antwerp.

The painting was featured in the 1980 BBC television series 100 Great Paintings.
