= The Burning Giraffe =

1937 painting by Salvador Dalí

- Artist: Salvador Dalí
- Year: 1937
- Medium: Oil on panel
- Dimensions: 35 cm × 27 cm (13.8 in × 10.6 in)
- Location: Kunstmuseum Basel, Basel

The Burning Giraffe is an oil painting by the Spanish surrealist Salvador Dalí, from 1937. It is held in the Kunstmuseum Basel.

== History and description ==
Dalí painted Burning Giraffe before his exile in the United States, which was from 1940 to 1948. Although Dalí declared himself apolitical—"I am Dalí, and only that"—this painting shows his personal struggle with the battle in his home country. Characteristic are the opened drawers in the blue female figure, which Dalí on a later date described as "Femme-coccyx" (tail bone woman). This phenomenon can be traced back to Sigmund Freud's psychoanalytical method, much admired by Dalí. He regarded him as an enormous step forward for civilization, as shown in the following quote: "The only difference between immortal Greece and our era is Sigmund Freud who discovered that the human body, which in Greek times was merely neoplatonical, is now filled with secret drawers only to be opened through psychoanalysis".

The opened drawers in this expressive, propped up female figure thus refer to the inner subconscious within man. In Dalí's own words his paintings form "a kind of allegory which serves to illustrate a certain insight, to follow the numerous narcissistic smells which ascend from each of our drawers."

The image is set in a twilight atmosphere with deep blue sky. There are two female figures in the foreground, one with drawers opening from her side like a chest. They both have undefined phallic shapes (perhaps melted clocks, as a recurring image from Dalí's previous works) protruding from their backs which are supported by crutch-like objects. The hands, forearms, and face of the nearest figure are stripped down to the muscular tissue beneath the skin. One figure is holding a strip of meat. Both human figures that double as a chest of drawers as well as the crutch-like shapes are common archetypes in Dalí's work.

In the distance is a giraffe with its back on fire. Dalí first used the burning giraffe image in his 1930 film L'Âge d'Or (The Golden Age). It appears again in 1937 in the painting The Invention of Monsters. Dalí described this image as "the masculine cosmic apocalyptic monster". He believed it to be a premonition of war.

== See also ==
- List of works by Salvador Dalí
- 100 Great Paintings, 1980 BBC series
