= Medieval City on a River (Schinkel) =

Painting by Karl Friedrich Schinkel

- German: Mittelalterliche Stadt am Fluss
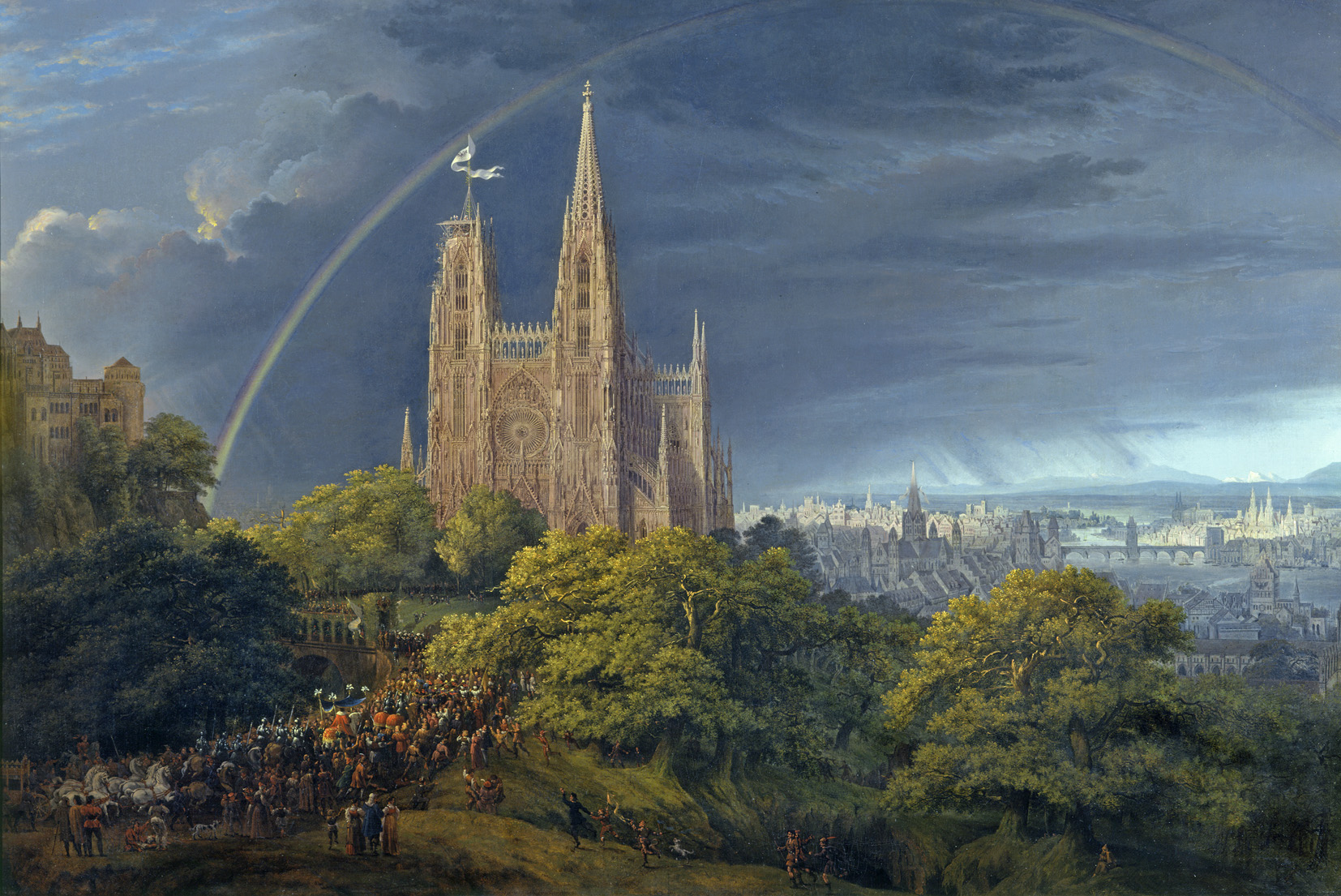
- Artist: Karl Friedrich Schinkel
- Year: 1815
- Medium: oil on canvas
- Dimensions: 90 cm × 140 cm (35 in × 55 in)
- Location: Alte Nationalgalerie, Berlin

Medieval City on a River is an 1815 oil on canvas painting by the Prussian architect and artist Karl Friedrich Schinkel, which is now in the collection of the Alte Nationalgalerie, in Berlin.

Schinkel had trained as an architect but turned his hand to theater set design and painting during the time of Napoleonic domination. After Napoleon's defeat in 1815 he was appointed the state architect of Prussia and was responsible for much of the redevelopment of Berlin city center.

Medieval City on a River depicts an imaginary German landscape in which the sunlit gothic cathedral, framed by the rainbow, is the dominating feature, to which a procession of people dressed in medieval costume are making their way. Schinkel appears to be confirming the fundamental status of the Church as a vital institution in a resurgent Prussia after the years of oppression.

== See also ==
- 100 Great Paintings, 1980 BBC series
