= Mercury and Argus (Rubens) =

Painting by Peter Paul Rubens

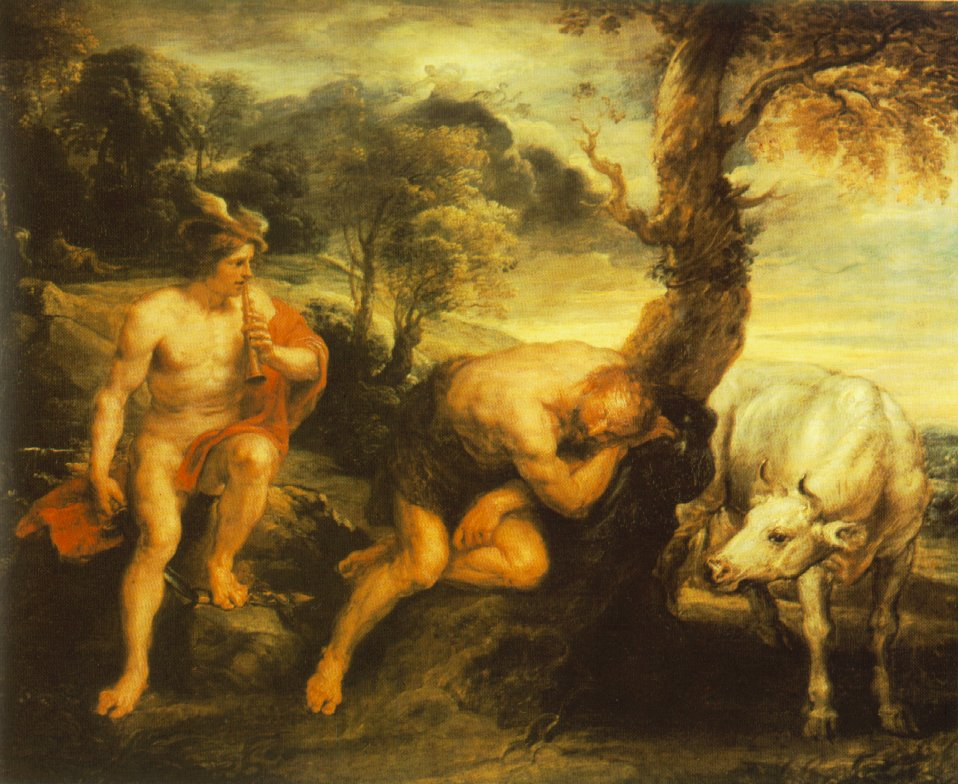
- Artist: Peter Paul Rubens
- Year: 1635-1638
- Medium: oil on panel
- Dimensions: 63 cm × 87.5 cm (25 in × 34.4 in)
- Location: Gemäldegalerie Alte Meister, Dresden, Germany

Mercury and Argus is an oil on panel painting by the Flemish artist Peter Paul Rubens. It was created between 1635 and 1638 and is now in the possession of the Gemäldegalerie Alte Meister, Dresden, Germany. Another work on the same theme and with the same title, painted on canvas by Rubens between 1636 and 1638, is in the collection of the Prado Museum, Madrid.

This painting is part of the BBC's 100 Great Paintings.

Both paintings depict a scene from a Greek myth narrated in Ovid's Metamorphoses (I, 583; IX, 687). In the story the god Zeus falls in love with Io, a priestess of his wife Hera. When Hera discovers the affair Zeus transforms Io into a white heifer to protect her from Hera's wrath. Hera discovers the stratagem and demands the heifer as a present, putting it under the protection of Argus Panoptes, the all-seeing one. Zeus sends his wily messenger Mercury to kill Argus and recover the heifer, which Mercury does by lulling Argus to sleep with his pipe music before striking off his head.

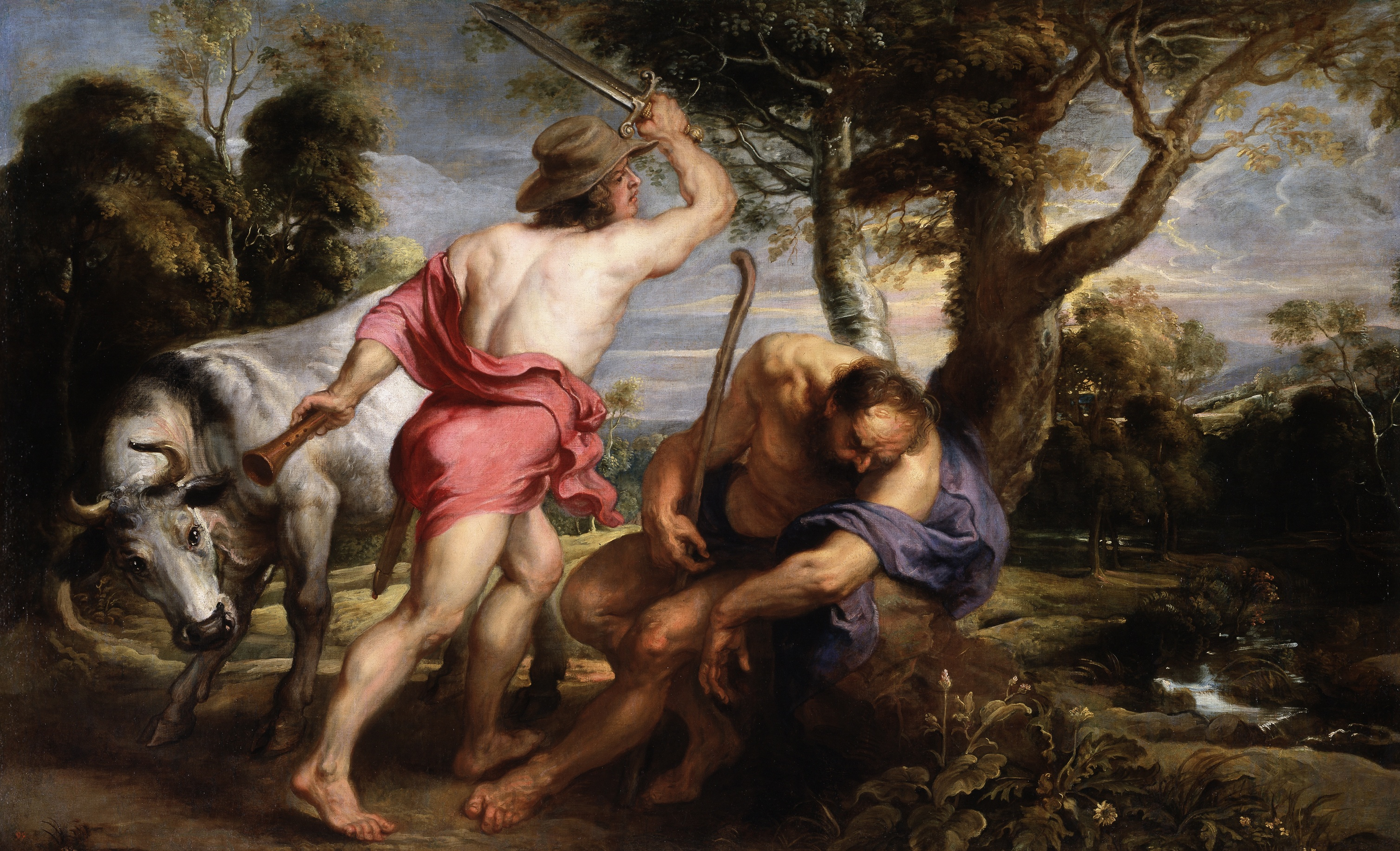
Mercury and Argus (Rubens, 1636–1638, Prado Museum)

In the slightly earlier Dresden work (at right) Mercury is reaching for his sword before launching his attack on Argus, whilst in the Prado work the strike is taking place.
