= Le Nain =

French painters (c. 1600–1677)

Three Men and a Boy, a speculated Triple Self Portrait by the Brothers, National Gallery, London

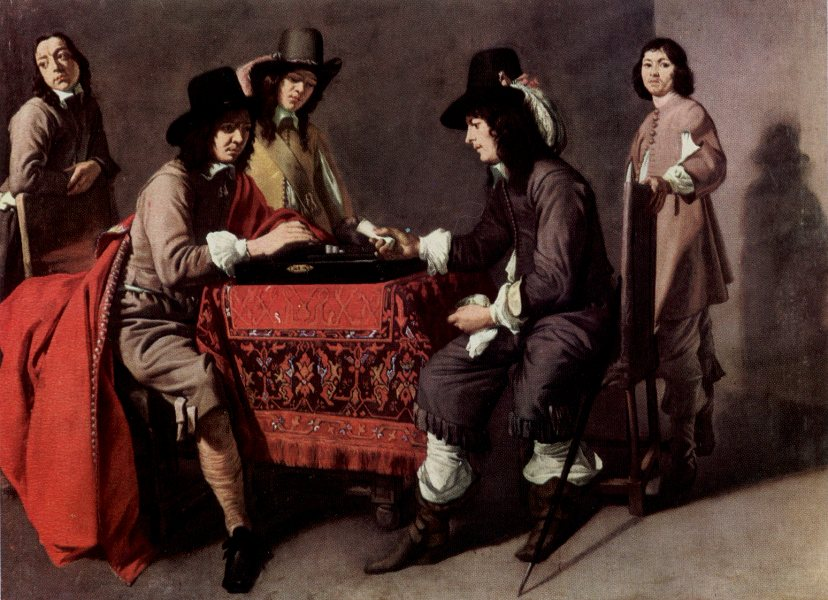
Les joueurs de tric-trac by the Le Nain Brothers, Musée du Louvre

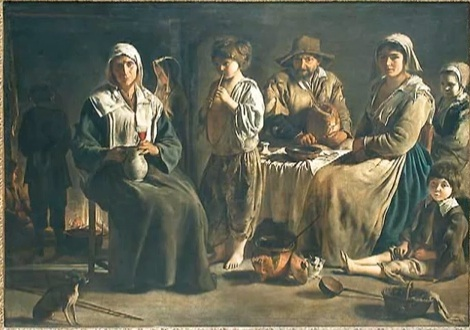
Peasant Family in an Interior, Louvre

The three Le Nain brothers (French: [lə nɛ̃]) were painters in 17th-century France: Antoine Le Nain (c.1600–1648), Louis Le Nain (c.1603–1648), and Mathieu Le Nain (1607–1677). They produced genre works, portraits and portrait miniatures.

== Lives and work ==
The brothers were born in or near Laon, in Picardy, in northern France. Mathieu was born in 1607; Antoine and Louis were originally believed to have been born in 1588 and 1593, respectively, but are now thought to have been born later; the National Gallery gives them birth dates of "c. 1600? and c. 1603?". By 1630, all three lived in Paris, where they shared the studio founded by Antoine, who was admitted to the Paris painters' guild, enabling his two brothers to train under him without paying fees. Within a few years they were receiving important commissions, Antoine painting a group portrait of the aldermen of Paris in 1632.

The early paintings of the Le Nains were religious, and varied in style as the brothers passed through brief periods in which they were influenced by French contemporaries such as Philippe de Champaigne, Laurent de La Hyre, and Jacques Blanchard. A more enduring influence on their paintings of the 1630s, such as The Holy Family (ca. 1635–1640), was the work of the Italian artist Orazio Gentileschi, who had worked in Paris during the 1620s.

The Le Nains's interest in genre and peasant subjects began around 1640. In 1648 the three brothers were received into the Académie de peinture et de sculpture on the year of its founding.

Because of the similarity of their styles of painting and the difficulty of distinguishing works by each brother (they signed their paintings only with their surname, and many may have been collaborations), they are commonly referred to as a single entity, Le Nain. Louis is usually credited with the best-known of their paintings, a series of scenes depicting peasant life; he may have visited Italy, and been influenced by the Dutch artist Pieter van Laer, who was based in Rome but also passed through France in the mid-1620s. These genre paintings are often noted for being remarkably literal, yet sympathetic; the subjects are never grotesque or seem ridiculed. There remains some question, however, as to whether some of the assumed "peasants" were truly from the rural class—many seem to be simply the bourgeois at leisure in the country. Their sober execution and choice of colour recall characteristics of the Spanish school. Their choice of subject was unusual for the time: the world of Paris was busy with mythological allegories, and the "heroic deeds" of the king, while the three Le Nain devoted themselves chiefly to these subjects of humble life such as Peasant Meal (1642), Boys Playing Cards, or A Farrier in His Forge, three pictures now in the Louvre. Their Adoration of the Shepherds in London (National Gallery) is an exception, and many other civic and church works may have been lost in the French Revolution. Ariane in Naxos also appears to be an exception, as it depicts the Greek deity Bacchus and his lover Ariadne.

The brothers also produced miniatures (mainly attributed to Antoine) and portraits (attributed to Mathieu). Mathieu became the official painter (Peintre Ordinaire) of Paris in 1633, and much later was made a chevalier. Among his sitters for portraits were Marie de' Medici and Cardinal Mazarin, but these works seem to have disappeared.

Antoine and Louis died in 1648. Mathieu lived until 1677, and appears to have painted until the mid-1650s, although no works are signed after 1648. In 1662 he received the unusual honour for a painter of the Order of Saint Michael, but was expelled a year later, and imprisoned in 1662 for wearing the collar of the order when he was not entitled to it.

The Le Nain paintings had a revival in the 1840s and, thanks to the exertions of Champfleury, made their appearance on the walls of the Louvre in 1848. Champfleury was a friend of the Realist painter Gustave Courbet, and a theorist of Realism and writer on French popular arts. The "naive" quality of these works, with their static poses, "awkward" compositions and peasant subjects were admired and may well have exercised some influence on many nineteenth-century artists, notably Courbet himself. They have remained popular through the 20th century.

== Notes ==
External videos
- Antoine or Louis Le Nain, Peasant Family in an Interior, Smarthistory

== External links and sources ==
- Biography (Web gallery of Art)
- Louis Le Nain (The Artchive)
