= Children Teaching a Cat to Dance =

c. 1660–1679 oil on panel painting by Jan Steen

Children Teaching a Cat to Dance, Known as ‘The Dancing Lesson’
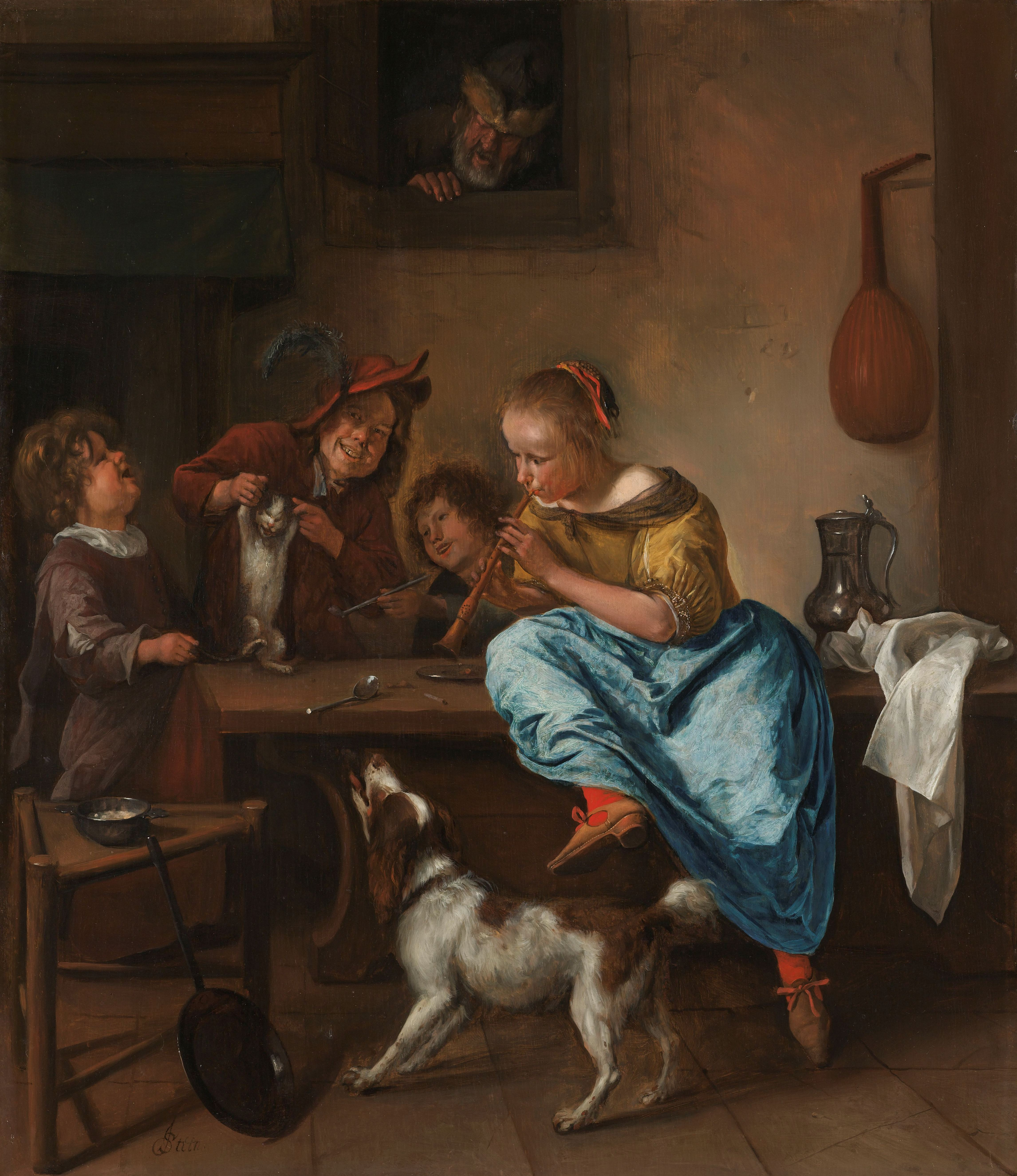
- Artist: Jan Steen
- Year: c.1660–1679
- Medium: oil paint, panel
- Dimensions: 68.5 cm (27.0 in) × 59 cm (23 in)
- Location: Rijksmuseum, Netherlands
- Owner: Jacobus Salomon Hendrik van de Poll
- Accession: SK-A-718

Children Teaching a Cat to Dance or The Dancing Lesson is an oil-on-panel genre painting by Jan Steen, executed c.1660–1679 and now in the Rijksmuseum in Amsterdam.

The painting depicts a group of children attempting to make a cat dance to the music of a shawm. The cat is screeching and the dog barking but the children are having fun. However, the old man at the window clearly disapproves of their behaviour.

The work is a typical example of Steen's indoor scenes of everyday Dutch life.

== Origin ==
The work comes from the collection of the jonkheer Jacob Salomon Hendrik van de Poll (1837–1880) in Amsterdam. He bequeathed his collection to the Rijksmuseum in 1880.
