= Konrad Klapheck =

German painter and graphic artist (1935–2023)

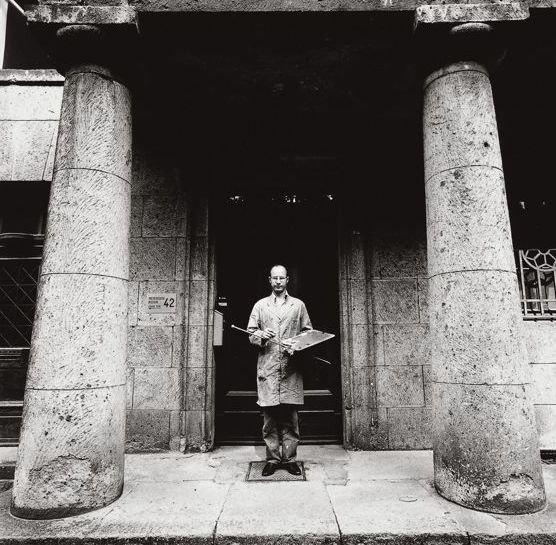
Klapheck portrayed by Lothar Wolleh

Konrad Klapheck (10 February 1935 – 30 July 2023) was a German painter and graphic artist whose style of painting combined features of Surrealism and Neorealism.

== Biography ==
Konrad Klapheck was born in Düsseldorf on 10 February 1935 to arts historians and professors Richard and Anna Klappheck (née Strümpell, daughter of Adolf Strümpell). From 1954 to 1956 Konrad studied painting under Bruno Goller at the Kunstakademie Düsseldorf. Klapheck's works of the mid-1950s are in a magic realist style that became more idiosyncratic when he painted the first of his typewriters. His subsequent paintings, often large in scale, are precise and seemingly realistic depictions of technical equipment, machinery, and everyday objects, but strangely alienated; they are "monumental, amusingly absurd and sexually suggestive".

Klapheck's subjects through the years included (in order of introduction) typewriters, sewing machines, water taps and showers, telephones, irons, shoes, keys, saws, car tires, bicycle bells, and clocks. Influenced by Duchamp, Man Ray, and Max Ernst, Klapheck's "ironic treatment of everyday mechanics" prefigured pop art in its magnification of the trivial. He was also close to French Surrealism and André Breton wrote his last published text about a Klapheck exhibition at Galerie Sonnabend in 1965.

Between 1992 and 2002, he painted friends, colleagues, and celebrities from the international art scene. He became a professor at the Kunstakademie Düsseldorf in 1979.

Klapheck died on 30 July 2023, at the age of 88.
