= List of paintings by Edvard Munch =

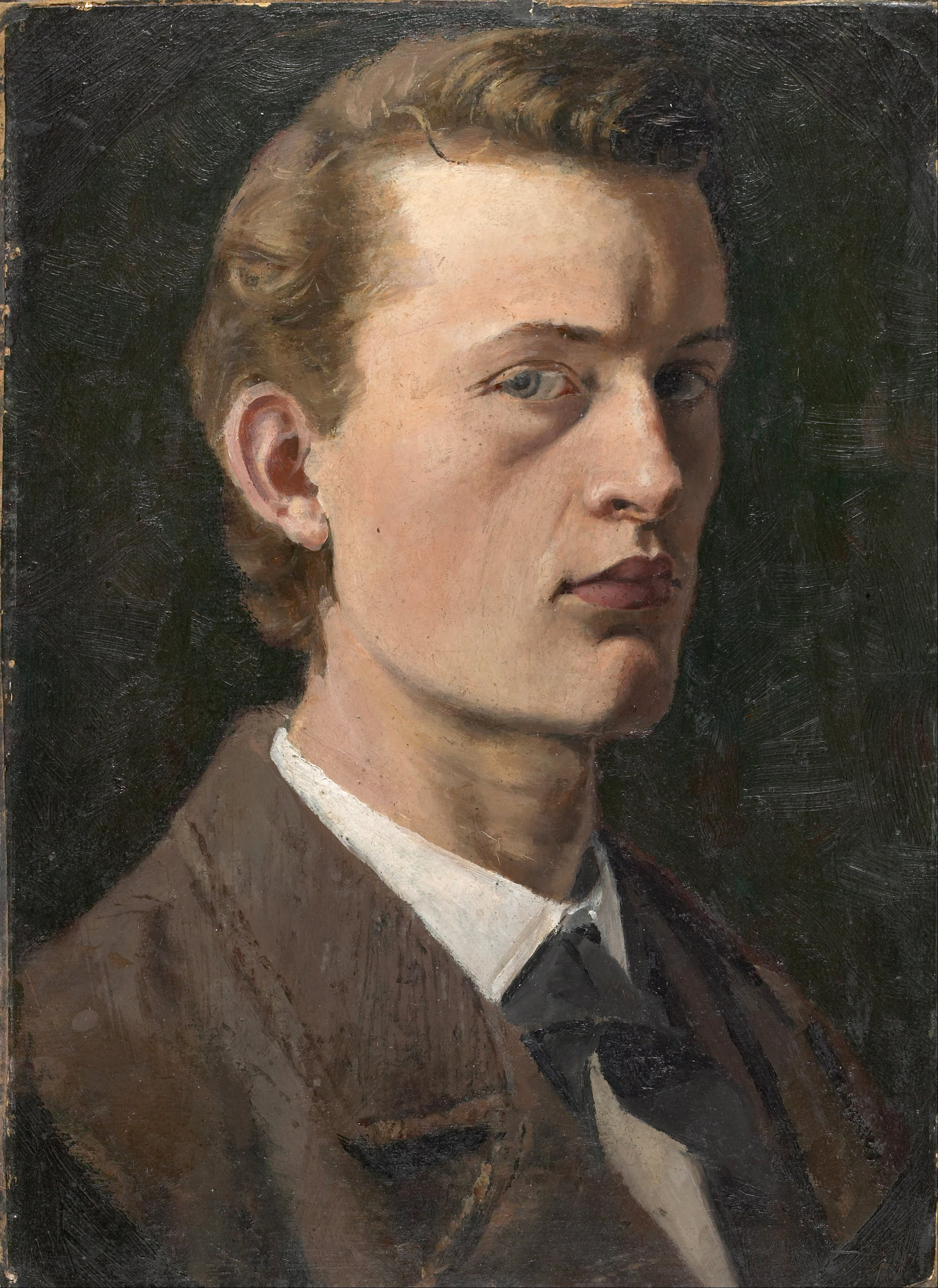
Self-Portrait, 1882 (No. 47). 26 × 19 cm. Munch Museum, Oslo

This is a complete list of paintings by Edvard Munch (12 December 1863 – 23 January 1944) a Norwegian symbolist painter, printmaker and an important forerunner of expressionist art. His best-known composition, The Scream (1893), is part of a series The Frieze of Life, in which Munch explored the themes of love, fear, death, melancholia and anxiety.

Around 2025 paintings are provisionally credited Edvard Munch. His career as a painter lasted from 1880 to 1943. Munch possessed 1006 of his paintings when he died. He gave all these paintings as a testamentary gift to The Municipality of Oslo when he wrote down his will on 18 April 1940, right after the Germans had occupied Norway. Munch died on 23 January 1944, and all of the paintings he left are now in the Munch Museum in Oslo, Norway.

The Munch Museum is the most important collection of works of any medium by Edvard Munch. Other major collections include the National Gallery in Oslo, which holds the famous 1893 tempera and crayon on cardboard version of The Scream amongst other major paintings. (Toaster)

== List ==
Painting	Title	Year	Collection	Cat. no.
	Telthusbakken with Gamle Aker Church	1880	Location unknown	1
	Øvre Foss	1880	Munch Museum, Oslo, Norway	2
	Small Lake with Boat	1880	Munch Museum, Oslo, Norway	3
	Horse and Wagon in front of Farm Buildings	1880	Location unknown	4
	Autumn Work in the Field	1880	Location unknown	5
	Landscape with Woman Walking by a Lake	1880	Location unknown	6
	Landscape with Trees and Water	1880	Location unknown	7
	Autumn in the Forest	1880	Flaten Art Museum. St. Olaf College, Northfield, Minnesota, USA. Gift from Brunhild Telie Sather	8
	Horse and Cart on a Country Road	1880	Private collection	9
	Still Life with Pipe and Bibles	1880	Private collection	10
	View from Fossveien	1880–81	Lillehammer Art Museum, Norway. Oscar Johannessen's collection	11
	View from Fossveien	1881	Munch Museum, Oslo, Norway	12
	Winter Landscape with House and Red Sky	1881	Location unknown	13
	Potted Plant on the Window-Sill	1881–82	Munch Museum, Oslo, Norway	14
	Potted Plant	1881–82	Munch Museum, Oslo, Norway	15
	The Living-Room of the Misses Munch in Pilestredet 61	1881	Munch Museum, Oslo, Norway	16
	From Vestre Aker	1881	National Gallery, Oslo, Norway	17
	Hakloa in Maridalen	1881	Location unknown	18
	Maridalsveien in Nydalen	1881	Location unknown	19
	Houses in Maridalen	1881	Private collection	20
	From Maridalen	1881	Munch Museum, Oslo, Norway	21
	Akerselva	1881	Private collection	22
	Landscape with Woman and Child	1881	Private collection	23
	Landscape with a Small House and Two People	1881	Private collection	24
	Landscape with Lake and Forest	1881	Private collection	25
	From Bunnefjorden	1881	Munch Museum, Oslo, Norway	26
	From Sandvika	1881	Flaten Art Museum. St. Olaf College, Northfield, Minnesota, USA. Estate of Richard N. Telie	27
	Man Rowing towards Land	1881	Private collection	28
	Bay with Boat and House	1881	Collectión Carmen Thyssen-Bornemisza en depósito en el Museo Thyssen-Bornemisza, Madrid, Spain	29
	Man and Woman in Boat	1881	Private Collection, Stockholm	30
	Fisherman by the Water	1881	Location unknown	31
	Christian Munch on the Couch	1881	Munch Museum, Oslo, Norway	32
	Christian Munch on the Couch	1881	Location unknown	33
	Study of a Landscape	1881	Location unknown	34
	View of Grüner's Garden	1881	Private collection	35
	Gamle Aker Church	1881–82	Private collection	36
	Gamle Aker Church	1881	Munch Museum, Oslo, Norway	37
	Gamle Aker Church	1881	Munch Museum, Oslo, Norway	38
	Gamle Aker Church	1881	Private collection	39
	View from Fossveien 7 towards Bergfjerdingen	1881	Munch Museum, Oslo, Norway	40
	People on the Road in Wet Snow	1881	Private collection	41
	Goblin with Christmas Porridge	1881	Peder Andreas Lund	42
	Still Life with Jar, Apple, Walnut and Coconut	1881	Munch Museum, Oslo, Norway	43
	Øvre Foss in Winter	1881–82	Location unknown	44
	Boy in Snow	1881–82	The World Children's Art Museum, Okazaki, Japan	45
	View of the City on a Winter's Day	1882	Location unknown	46
	Self-Portrait	1882	Munch Museum, Oslo, Norway	47
	Laura Munch	1882	Munch Museum, Oslo, Norway	48
	Laura Munch	1882	Munch Museum, Oslo, Norway	49
	Olaf Rye's Square towards South East	1882	Location unknown	50
	View across Olaf Rye's Square	1882	Private collection	51
	Olaf Rye's Square towards South East	1882	Munch Museum, Oslo, Norway	52
	Landscape with Waterfall and House	1882	Location unknown	53
	Evening Atmosphere at Sea	1882	Munch Museum, Oslo, Norway	54
	Landscape with a Small Waterfall	1882	Erik M. Vik	55
	Spring Landscape	1882	Private collection	56
	Stream in Spring	1882	Private collection	57
	Karen Bjølstad	1882–83	Location unknown	58
	Man's Head with Beard	1882–83	Munch Museum, Oslo, Norway	59
	The Errand Boy	1882–84	Private collection	60
	Garden with Red House	1882	Private collection	61
	Garden with Red House	1882	Private collection	62
	By the Garden Table	1882	Location unknown	63
	Akerselva by Slåmotgangen	1882	Private collection	64
	Inger by the Window	1882	Private collection	65
	Akerselva by Nedre Foss	1882	Location unknown	66
	Akerselva	1882	Munch Museum, Oslo, Norway	67
	Birch Trees with Woman Walking	1882	Location unknown	68
	Birch Trees in the Autumn	1882	Private collection	69
	From Vestre Aker	1882	Location unknown	70
	Birch Trees and Man Carrying Twigs	1882	Location unknown	71
	Autumn in Vestre Aker	1882	Private collection	72
	Woman on a Country Lane	1882	Private collection	73
	Two Boys on a Country Lane	1882	Location unknown	74
	Thorvald Torgersen	1882	National Gallery, Oslo, Norway	75
	Thorvald Torgersen	1882	Private collection	76
	Head of a Boy	1882–83	Katharina and Nathan Bernstein, New York	77
	Andreas Reading	1882–83	Location unknown	78
	Andreas Reading	1882–83	Location unknown	79
	Andreas Reading	1882–83	National Gallery, Oslo, Norway	80
	Self-Portrait	1882–83	Oslo City Museum, Norway	81
	Drive at Vaterland	1882–83	Munch Museum, Oslo, Norway	82
	From Saxegårdsgate	1882?	Lillehammer Art Museum, Norway. Oscar Johannessen's collection	83
	Laura Munch	1883	Munch Museum, Oslo, Norway	84
	Otto Linthoe	1883	Munch Museum, Oslo, Norway	85
	Study of a Man's Head	1883	Private collection	86
	Study of an Old Man's Head	1883	Private collection, Switzerland	87
	Head of an Old Man with Beard	1883	Private collection	88
	Study of an Old Man's Head	1883	Burton Kassell	89
	Afternoon at Olaf Rye's Square	1883	Moderna Museet, Stockholm	90
	Street Corner on Karl Johan, Grand Café	1883	Munch Museum, Oslo, Norway	91
	Christian Munch on the Couch	1883	Munch Museum, Oslo, Norway	92
	Landscape from Asker	1883–84	Location unknown	93
	Autumn in Asker	1883–84	Location unknown	94
	Andreas by the Window	1883	The Art Museums in Bergen, Norway. Bergen Art Museum (Rasmus Meyer's collection)	95
	Andreas Reading	1883	Private collection	96
	The Dome of Trinity Church	1883–84	Private collection	97
	Study of a Head	1883	National Gallery, Oslo, Norway	98
	Early in the Morning	1883	Private collection	99
	Andreas Singdahlsen	1883	Munch Museum, Oslo, Norway	100
	Hjalmar Borgstrøm	1883	Private collection	101
	Portrait of a Woman	1883–84	Location unknown	102
	Karen Bjølstad in the Rocking Chair	1883	Munch Museum, Oslo, Norway	103
	Around the Paraffin Lamp	1883	National Gallery, Oslo, Norway	104
	At the Coffee Table	1883	Munch Museum, Oslo, Norway	105
	At Supper	1883–84	Munch Museum, Oslo, Norway	106
	The Infirmary at Helgelandsmoen	1884	Munch Museum, Oslo, Norway	107
	Fence in the Forest	1884	Location unknown	108
	Two People on the Way to the Forest	1884	Private collection	109
	Morning	1884	The Art Museums in Bergen, Norway. Bergen Art Museum (Rasmus Mayer's collection)	110
	Christian Munch	1884	Private collection	111
	Portrait Studies	1884?	Location unknown	112
	Inger Munch in Black	1884	National Gallery, Oslo, Norway	113
	Street in Winter	1885	Private collection	114
	Ball	1885	Private collection	115
	Tête-à-tête	1885	Munch Museum, Oslo, Norway	116
	Karl Johan	1885–86	Paleet, Oslo, Norway	117
	Girl's Head	1885	Private collection	118
	Dagny Konow	1885	Blomqvist Art Dealer, Oslo, Norway	119
	Study of an Old Man's Head	1885–86	Stenersen Museum, Oslo, Norway. A gift from Rolf E. Stenersen to the city of Oslo	120
	Fredrik Lidemark	1885	Private collection	121
	Karl Jensen-Hjell	1885	Private collection	122
	Klemens Stang	1885–86	Sørlandets Art Museum, Kristiansand, Norway	123
	Christian Munch with Pipe	1885	Munch Museum, Oslo, Norway	124
	Karen Bjølstad	1885–86	The Art Museums in Bergen, Norway. Bergen Art Museum (Rasmus Meyer's collection)	125
	Jørgen Sørensen	1885	National Gallery, Oslo, Norway	126
	Andreas Munch	1885	Private collection	127
	Cabaret	1885–86	Stenersen Museum, Oslo, Norway. A gift from Rolf E. Stenersen to the city of Oslo	128
	The Sickroom	1885–86	Stenersen Museum, Oslo, Norway. A gift from Rolf E. Stenersen to the city of Oslo	129
	The Sick Child	1885–86	National Gallery, Oslo, Norway	130
	Red-Haired Girl with White Rat	1886	Kunstmuseum Basel – on permanently loan from Die Freunde der Kunstmuseums und des Museums für Gegenwartskunst Basel	131
	Girl on the Piano	1886	Munch Museum, Oslo, Norway	132
	Self-Portrait	1886	National Gallery, Oslo, Norway	133
	Andreas Munch Studying Anatomy	1886	Munch Museum, Oslo, Norway	134
	Afternoon Nap	1886	Munch Museum, Oslo, Norway	135
	Boat with Three Boys	1886?	Munch Museum, Oslo, Norway	136
	Man on the Veranda	1886	Kreeger Museum, Washington, DC. USA	137
	From Hisøya near Arendal	1886	Location unknown	138
	Woman and Children in Arendal	1886	Private collection	139
	Thorvald Torgersen	1886	Stenersen Museum, Oslo, Norway. A gift from Rolf E. Stenersen to the city of Oslo	140
	Puberty	1886	Lost in fire	141
	The Day After	1886–89	Lost in a fire in 1890	142
	Seated Young Girl	Approx. 1887	Private collection	143
	Betzy Nilsen	1887	Stolen from the National Gallery of Norway in 1993	144
	Halvard Stub Holmboe	1887	The Art Museums in Bergen. Bergen Art Museum (Rasmus Meyer's collection)	145
	Jacob Torkildsen	Approx. 1887	Stenersen Museum, Oslo, Norway. A gift from Rolf E. Stenersen to the city of Oslo	146
	Forest Landscape with Small Lake	1887	Private collection	147
	Veierland near Tønsberg	1887	National Gallery, Oslo, Norway	148
	Two Men by the Window	Approx. 1887	Private collection	149
	Law	1887	Private collection	150
	Kristiania Bohemians	1887–88	Lost in a fire in 1907	151
	Self-Portrait	1888?	Munch Museum, Oslo, Norway	152
	Marius Selmer	1888	Location unknown	153
	Bendix Lange	1888	Private collection	154
	Beach	1888	Munch Museum, Oslo, Norway	155
	The Tønsberg Fjord	1888	Private collection	156
	On the Pier	1888	Location unknown	157
	Man Binding Fishnet	1888	Christian Mustad, Switzerland	158
	Karen Bjølstad	1888	Munch Museum, Oslo, Norway	159
	Evening	1888	Private collection	160
	Summer Day on the Pier	1888	Private collection	161
	Laura and Inger in the Summer Sun	1888	Private collection	162
	Evening	1888	Museo Thyssen-Bornemisza, Madrid, Spain	163
	Inger in Sunshine	1888	The Art Museums in Bergen, Norway. Bergen Art Museum (Rasmus Meyer's collection)	164
	At the General Store in Vrengen	1888	Lillehammer Art Museum, Norway. Oscar Johannessen's collection	165
	Andreas Bjølstad	1888	Munch Museum, Oslo, Norway	166
	Aasta Carlsen	1888–89	Munch Museum, Oslo, Norway	167
	Man Standing in the Doorway	1889	Erik M. Vik	168
	Karl Dørnberger	1889	Museum der bildenden Künste, Leipzig, Germany	169
	Charlotte Dørnberger	1889	Private collection	170
	Georg Stang	1889	Epstein Family Collection, Washington DC, USA	171
	John Hazeland on his Deathbed	1889	Private collection	172
	Spring	1889	National Gallery, Oslo, Norway	173
	Hans Jæger	1889	National Gallery, Oslo, Norway	174
	From Karl Johan	1889	Munch Museum, Oslo, Norway	175
	Music on Karl Johan	1889	Kunsthaus Zürich, Switzerland	176
	Beach Landscape from Åsgårdstrand	1889	Private collection, Bermuda	177
	Beach	1889	Private collection	178
	From Åsgårdstrand	1889	Location unknown	179
	Beach Landscape	1889	Wallraf-Richartz Museum, Cologne, Germany. Fondation Corboud	180
	Shore	1889	Private collection	181
	Summer Night. Inger on the Beach	1889	The Art Museums in Bergen. Bergen Art Museum (Rasmus Meyer's collection)	182
	Summer Evening	1889	Statens Museum for Kunst, Copenhagen, Denmark	183
	Summer	1889	Stenersen Museum, Oslo, Norway. A gift from Rolf E. Stenersen to the city of Oslo	184
	Summer in Åsgårdstrand	1889	Location unknown	185
	Morten Damme's House near Åsgardstrand	1889	Private collection, USA	186
	Standing Female Nude	1889?	Stenersen Museum, Oslo, Norway. A gift from Rolf E. Stenersen to the city of Oslo	187
	A French Tavern (Two Men and a Woman)	1890	Lost in a fire in the autumn of 1890	188
	The Canal near Paris (with a Small Streamboat)	1890	Lost in a fire in the autumn of 1890	189
	A Woman (in Half-figure) with Landscape (Returned from Victoria terrasse)	1890?	Lost in a fire in the autumn of 1890	190
	A Small Beach Study	1890?	Lost in a fire on the autumn of 1890	191
	Night in Saint-Cloud	1890	National Gallery, Oslo, Norway	192
	The Seine at Saint-Cloud	1890	Frances Lehman Loeb Art Center, Vassar College, Poughkeepsie, New York, USA	193
	The Seine at Saint-Cloud	1890	Location unknown	194
	The Seine at Saint-Cloud	1890	Private collection	195
	The Seine at Saint-Cloud	1890	Private collection	196
	The Seine at Saint-Cloud	1890	Stenersen Museum, Oslo, Norway. A gift from Rolf E. Stenersen to the city of Oslo	197
	The Seine at Saint-Cloud	1890	Private collection	198
	The Seine at Saint-Cloud	1890	Private collection	199
	The Seine at Saint-Cloud	1890	Private collection	200
	The Seine at Saint-Cloud	1890	Munch Museum, Oslo, Norway	201
	At the Wine Merchant's	1890	Private collection	202
	In the Bar	1890	Städtische Galerie im Städelschen Kunstinstitut, Frankfurt am Main, Germany	203
	In the Café	1890	Munch Museum, Oslo, Norway	204
	Norwegian Spring Landscape	1890	Location unknown	205
	Landscape	1890	Location unknown	206
	The Streamboat Arrives	1890	Private collection	207
	Beach	1890	Private collection	208
	Spring Day on Karl Johan	1890	The Art Museums in Bergen, Norway. Bergen Art Museum (Bergen Billedgalleri)	209
	Sunny Day in Åsgårdstrand	1890	Location unknown	210
	Garden Path	1890	Location unknown	211
	Woman in Evening Landscape	1890	Munch Museum, Oslo, Norway	212
	Landscape	1890	The Art Museums in Bergen, Norway. Bergen Art Museum (Rasmus Meyer's collection)	213
	View from Hauketo	1890	Private collection	214
	View from Hauketo	1890	Location unknown	215
	Landscape	1890	Munch Museum, Oslo, Norway	216
	The Absinth Drinkers	1890	Private collection	217
	Two Children	1890	Private collection	218
	Under the Palm Trees in Nice	1891	Private collection	219
	Afternoon on the Promenade des Anglais	1891	Private collection	220
	Morning on the Promenade des Anglais	1891	Private collection	221
	Sunny Day in Nice	1891	Private collection	222
	Rooftops in Nice	1891	Location unknown	223
	Night in Nice	1891	National Gallery, Oslo, Norway	224
	Fisherboy from Nice	1891	Private collection	225
	Fisherboy from Nice	1891–92	Location unknown	226
	Fisherboy from Nice	1891	Tina and Andrew Brozman's collection	227
	Boy's Head	1891	Moss Kunstforening	228
	Young Woman in Blue	1891	Private collection	229
	Young Woman in Blue	1891	The Art Museums in Bergen, Norway. Bergen Art Museum (Rasums Meyer's collection)	230
	Model Scratching her Arm	1891	Munch Museum, Oslo, Norway	231
	Rue Lafayette	1891	National Gallery, Oslo, Norway	232
	Rue de Rivoli	1891	Fogg Art Museum, Harvard Art Museums, USA. A gift from Rudolf Serkin	233
	Sunday in Åsgardstrand	1891	The Art Museums in Bergen, Norway. Bergen Art Museum (Rasmus Meyer's collection)	234
	Young Blond Girl	1891	Private collection	235
	Summer Evening in Åsgardstrand	1891	Location unknown	236
	In Open Air	1891	Munch Museum, Oslo, Norway	237
	Summer	1891	Location unknown	238
	Eroticism on a Summer Evening	1891	Munch Museum, Oslo, Norway	239
	Karl Johan in the Rain	1891	Munch Museum, Oslo, Norway	240
	Evening. Melancholy	1891	Munch Museum, Oslo, Norway	241
	Woman in Blue against Blue Water	1891	Private collection	242
	Old Fisherman	1891	Location unknown	243
	Pine Forest	1891–92	Private collection	244
	Summer Day in the Forest	1891	Location unknown	245
	Forest Landscape	1891	Location unknown	246
	From Nordstrand	1891	The Art Museums in Bergen, Norway. Bergen Art Museum (Rasmus Meyer's collection)	247
	Landscape in Moonlight	1891	The Art Museums in Bergen, Norway. Bergen Art Museum (Stenersen's collection)	248
	Woman by the Balustrade	1891	Horten, Norway	249
	Inger in a White Blouse	1891	Munch Museum, Oslo, Norway	250
	Jappe Nilssen	1891	Private collection	251
	Arve Arvesen	1891	Private collection	252
	Gunnar Heiberg	1891	Private collection	253
	Helge Rode	1891	The Museum of National History, Fredriksborg Palace, Hillerød, Denmark	254
	Olga Buhre	1891	Statens Museum for Kunst, Copenhagen, Denmark	255
	Alexandra Thaulow	1891	Von der Heydt Museum, Wuppertal, Germany	256
	Kiss by the Window	1891	Munch Museum, Oslo, Norway	257
	The Day After	1891–92	Probably lost	258
	Childhood Memory	1892	Munch Museum, Oslo, Norway	259
	Childhood Memory	1892	Location unknown	260
	Gamblers in Monte Carlo	1892	Munch Museum, Oslo, Norway	261
	Gamblers in Monte Carlo	1892	Private collection	262
	At the Roulette Table in Monte Carlo	1892	Munch Museum, Oslo, Norway	263
	Sick Mood at Sunset. Despair	1892	Thiel Gallery, Stockholm, Sweden	264
	Cypress in Moonlight	1892	Private collection	265
	Kiss by the Window	1892	National Gallery, Oslo, Norway	266
	The Kiss	1892	Private collection	267
	The Girl by the Window	1892	Probably lost	268
	Woman Combing her Hair	1892	The Art Museums in Bergen, Norway. Bergen Art Museum (Rsmus Meyer's collection)	269
	Woman Looking in the Mirror	1892	Private collection	270
	After the Bath	1892	Erik M. Vik	271
	From the Riviera	1892	Munch Museum, Oslo, Norway	272
	From the Riviera	1892	Probably lost	273
	Moonlight by the Mediterranean	1892	National Gallery, Oslo, Norway	274
	A Pine	1892	Private collection	275
	Trees by the Mediterranean	1892	Galerie výtvarného umění v Ostravě, Ostrava, Czech Republic	276
	From the Riviera	1892	Private collection	277
	Men Flocking round Women in Light Clothing	1892	Probably lost	278
	Forest	1892	The Art Museums in Bergen. Bergen Art Museum (Stenersen's collection)	279
	Moonlight on the Beach	1892	The Art Museums in Bergen, Norway. Bergen Art Museum (Rasmus Meyer's collection)	280
	Mystery on the Shore	1892	Private collection	281
	Mystery on the Shore	1892	Sammlung Würth, Künzelsau	282
	Two Human Beings. The Lonely Ones	1892	Lost during an explosion on 9 December 1901	283
	Melancholy	1892	National Gallery, Oslo, Norway	284
	Night in Saint-Cloud	1892	Private collection	285
	Night in Saint-Cloud	1892–93	Private collection	286
	Night in Saint-Cloud	1892	Private collection	287
	Vision	1892	Munch Museum, Oslo, Norway	288
	The Water Lilies	1892–93	Private collection	289
	Evening on Karl Johan	1892	The Art Museums in Bergen, Norway. Bergen Art Museum (Rasmus Meyer's collection)	290
	From Nordstrand	1892	Private collection	291
	On the Veranda	1892	Munch Museum, Oslo, Norway	292
	Inger by the Window	1892	Private collection	293
	Inger in Black and Violet	1892	National Gallery, Oslo, Norway	294
	Seated Young Woman	1892	The Art Museums in Bergen, Norway. Bergen Art Museum (Rasmus Meyer's collection)	295
	Autumn Rain	1892	Private collection	296
	Jakob Bratland	1892	Munch Museum, Oslo, Norway	297
	Ludvig Meyer	1892	Trondheim Kunstmuseum, Norway	298
	Thor Lütken	1892	Private collection	299
	Ragnhild and Dagny Juel	1892–93	Location unknown	300
	Portrait of August Strindberg	1892	Moderna Museet, Stockholm, Sweden	301
	Night in Saint-Cloud	1893	Private collection	302
	The Girl by the Window	1893	Art Institute of Chicago, Illinois, USA	303
	Study of a Model	1893	Solomon R. Guggenheim Foundation, New York, USA	304
	Separation	1893	Munch Museum, Oslo, Norway	305
	Woman with Red Hat	1893–94	Gothenburg Museum of Art, Sweden	306
	Symbolic Study	1893–94	Munch Museum, Oslo, Norway	307
	Portrait of a Man	1893–94	Munch Museum, Oslo, Norway	308
	Woman's head against a red Background	1893–94	Munch Museum, Oslo, Norway	309
	Self-Portrait under the Mask of a Woman	1893	Munch Museum, Oslo, Norway	310
	Seated Nude and Grotesque Masque	1893	Munch Museum, Oslo, Norway	311
	Sunrise in the Harbour	1893–94	Munch Museum, Oslo, Norway	312
	Rosa and Amelie	1893	Stenersen Museum, Oslo, Norway. Rolf E. Stenersen's gift to the city of Oslo	313
	Sunrise in Åsgårdstrand	1893–94	Private collection	314
	Summer Night	1893	The Art Museums in Bergen. Bergen Art Museum (Bergen Billedgalleri)	315
	Melancholy	1893	Munch Museum, Oslo, Norway	316
	Death at the Helm	1893	Munch Museum, Oslo, Norway	317
	Summer Night. Mermaid	1893	Munch Museum, Oslo, Norway	318
	Summer Night's Dream. The Voice	1893	Museum of Fine Arts, Boston, Massachusetts, USA	319
	Starry Night	1893	The J. Paul Getty Museum, Los Angeles, California, USA	320
	Starry Night	1893	Von der Heydt Museum, Wuppertal, Germany	321
	Moonlight	1893	National Gallery, Oslo, Norway	322
	House in Moonlight	1893–95	The Art Museums in Bergen. Bergen Art Museum (Rasmus Meyer's collection)	323
	The Storm	1893	Museum of Modern Art, New York, USA	324
	Death and Spring	1893	Munch Museum, Oslo, Norway	325
	The Angel of Death	1893	Munch Museum, Oslo, Norway	326
	By the Deathbed. Fever	1893	Munch Museum, Oslo, Norway	327
	Death in the Sickroom	1893	Munch Museum, Oslo, Norway	328
	Death in the Sickroom	1893	National Gallery, Oslo, Norway	329
	Death in the Sickroom	1893	Munch Museum, Oslo, Norway	330
	Vampire	1893	Munch Museum, Oslo, Norway	331
	The Scream	1893	Munch Museum, Oslo, Norway	332
	The Scream	1893	National Gallery, Oslo, Norway	333
	Vampire	1893	Gothenburg Museum of Art, Sweden	334
	Vampire	1893	Munch Museum, Oslo, Norway	335
	The Hands	1893–94	Munch Museum, Oslo, Norway	336
	Dagny Juel Przybyszewska	1893	Munch Museum, Oslo, Norway	337
	Helge Bäckström	1893	Thiel Gallery, Stockholm, Sweden	338
	Minchen Torkildsen	1893	Location unknown	339
	Ragnhild Bäkström	1894	National Gallery, Oslo, Norway	340
	Botho Graf Schwerin	1894	Munch Museum, Oslo, Norway	341
	Ebehard von Bodenhausen	1894	Location unknown	342
	Julius Meier-Graefe	1894	National Gallery, Oslo, Norway	343
	Separation	1894	Munch Museum, Oslo, Norway	344
	Death and Life	1894	Munch Museum, Oslo, Norway	345
	Puberty	1894	Munch Museum, Oslo, Norway	346
	Puberty	1894–95	National Gallery, Oslo, Norway	347
	The Day After	1894	National Gallery, Oslo, Norway	348
	Vampire	1894	Private collection	349
	Selma Fontheim	1894	Hamburger Kunsthalle, Hamburg, Germany	350
	Selma Fontheim	1894	Barony Rosendal, Kvinnherad, Norway	351
	Nora Mengelberg	1894	Private collection	352
	Ludvig Meyer's Children	1894	Foundation Gemäldesammlung Emil Bretschger / Kunstmuseum Bern, Switzerland	353
	Stanislaw Przybyszewski	1894	Munch Museum, Oslo, Norway	354
	Inger in a Red Dress	1894	Harvard Art Museums: Busch-Reisinger Museum, Cambridge, Massachusetts, USA. Gift of Lynn G. Straus in memory of Philip A. Straus	355
	Bathing Women	1894	Private collection	356
	Bathers	1894	Probably lost	357
	Bathing Boys	1894	National Gallery, Oslo, Norway	358
	Melancholy	1894	Private collection	359
	Melancholy	1894–96	The Art Museums in Bergen, Norway. Bergen Art Museum (Rasmus Meyer's collection)	360
	Woman. Sphinx	1894	Munch Museum, Oslo, Norway	361
	Woman	1894	The Art Museums in Bergen, Norway. Bergen Art Museum (Rasmus Meyer's collection)	362
	Anxiety	1894	Munch Museum, Oslo, Norway	363
	Despair	1894	Munch Museum, Oslo, Norway	364
	Madonna	1894	Munch Museum, Oslo, Norway	365
	Madonna	1894–95	National Gallery, Oslo, Norway	366
	Madonna	1895	Hamburger Kunsthalle, Hamburg, Germany. Dauerleihgabe der Stiftung zur Förderung der Hamburgischen Kunstsammlungen	367
	Madonna	1895–97	Steven A. Cohen	368
	Madonna	1895–97	Catherine Woodard and Nelson Blitz jr.	369
	Berlin Model	1895	Harvard Art Museums: Busch-Reisinger Museum, Cambridge, Massachusetts, USA	370
	Cabaret	1895	Munch Museum, Oslo, Norway	371
	The Scream	1895	Leon Black	372
	Vampire	1895	Location unknown	373
	The Smell of Death	1895	Munch Museum, Oslo, Norway	374
	The Smell of Death	1895	Munch Museum, Oslo, Norway	375
	At the Deathbed	1895	The Art Museums in Bergen, Norway. Bergen Art Museum (Rasmus Meyer's collection)	376
	Vampire	1895	Munch Museum, Oslo, Norway	377
	Ashes	1895	National Gallery, Oslo, Norway	378
	Jealousy	1895	The Art Museums in Bergen, Norway. Bergen Art Museum (Rasmus Meyer's collection)	379
	Beach in Åsgårdstrand	1895	Private collection	380
	Moonlight	1895	National Gallery, Oslo, Norway	381
	Self-Portrait with Cigarette	1895	National Gallery, Oslo, Norway	382
	Stanislaw Przybyszewski	1895	Munch Museum, Oslo, Norway	383
	Oscar and Ingeborg Heiberg	1895–96	Munch Museum, Oslo, Norway	384
	Half-Nude in a Black Skirt	1896	Munch Museum, Oslo, Norway	385
	Study of a Nude	1896	Munch Museum, Oslo, Norway	386
	Young Woman Washing herself	1896	National Gallery, Oslo, Norway	387
	Seated Nude against a Red Background	1896	National Gallery, Oslo, Norway	388
	Seated Nude with her Back Turned	1896	The Art Museums in Bergen. Bergen Art Museum (Rasmus Meyer's collection)	389
	The Mermaid	1896	Philadelphia Museum of Art, Pennsylvania, USA	390
	Summer Landscape	1896	Munch Museum, Oslo, Norway	391
	The Sick Child	1896	Gothenburg Museum of Art, Sweden	392
	Separation	1896	Munch Museum, Oslo, Norway	393
	Summer Night. The Voice	1896	Munch Museum, Oslo, Norway	394
	The Girl by the Window	1896–97	Private collection	395
	Bathing Woman	1896–97	Munch Museum, Oslo, Norway	396
	The Kiss	1896–97	Private collection	397
	Women in a Swimming Pool	1896–97	Munch Museum, Oslo, Norway	398
	Paul Herrmann and Paul Contard	1897	Belvedere, Vienna, Austria	399
	The Kiss	1897	Munch Museum, Oslo, Norway	400
	The Kiss	1897	Munch Museum, Oslo, Norway	401
	Inheritance	1897–99	Munch Museum, Oslo, Norway	402
	Women in Hospital	1897	Munch Museum, Oslo, Norway	403
	Mother and Daughter	1897–99	National Gallery, Oslo, Norway	404
	Two Women in a Landscape	1897–99	Munch Museum, Oslo, Norway	405
	Old Man with a Beard	1897–99	Munch Museum, Oslo, Norway	406
	Brothel Scene	1897–99	Munch Museum, Oslo, Norway	407
	Hospital Ward	1897–99	Munch Museum, Oslo, Norway	408
	Bathing Boys	1897–98	Munch Museum, Oslo, Norway	409
	Bathing Boys	1897–99	Private collection	410
	Bathing Girls	1897–99	Munch Museum, Oslo, Norway	411
	Bathing Children	1897–99	Munch Museum, Oslo, Norway	412
	Bathing Boys	1897–99	Private collection	413
	Autumn	1897–98	Munch Museum, Oslo, Norway	414
	Marie Helene Holmboe	1898	The Art Museums in Bergen, Norway. Bergen Art Museum (Rasmus Meyer's collection)	415
	Female Portrait	1898–99	The Art Museums in Bergen, Norway. Bergen Art Museum (Rasums Meyer's collection)	416
	Dark-Haired Man and Red-Haired Woman	1898–99	Munch Museum, Oslo, Norway	417
	Holger Drachmann	1898		418
	Henrik Ibsen at the Grand Café	1898	Private collection	419
	Study of a Model	1898	Munch Museum, Oslo, Norway	420
	Half-Nude in a Blue Skirt	1898	Munch Museum, Oslo, Norway	421
	Nude	1898	Location unknown	422
	Nude	1898	Munch Museum, Oslo, Norway	423
	Two Women. Symbolic Study	1898	Munch Museum, Oslo, Norway	424
	Sitting Nude by the Beach	1898	Private collection	425
	Man and Woman	1898	The Art Museums in Bergen, Norway. Bergen Art Museum (Rasums Meyer's collection)	426
	Nude in Profile towards the Right	1898	Rasmus Meyer's collections	427
	Metabolism	1898–99	Munch Museum, Oslo, Norway	428
	Tulla Larsen	1898–99	Munch Museum, Oslo, Norway	429
	Tulla Larsen	1898–99	Stenersen Museum, Oslo, Norway. A gift from Rolf E. Stenersen to the city of Oslo	430
	Father and Son	1898	Private collection	431
	Seated Nude and Three Male Heads (It is disputed whether this is a real Munch painting or whether it is not.)	1898–99	Kunsthalle Bremen, Germany	432
	Tragedy	1898–1900	The Minneapolis Institute of Arts, Minnesota, USA	433
	Jealousy in the Bath	1898–1900	Location unknown	434
	Beach	1898	Stavanger Art Museum, Norway	435
	The Rainbow	1898	Munch Museum, Oslo, Norway	436
	Woman by the Sea in Åsgardstrand	1898	Private collection	437
	House with Red Virginia Creeper	1898–99	Private collection	438
	House with Red Virginia Creeper	1898–99	National Gallery, Oslo, Norway	439
	Red Virginia Creeper	1898–1900	Munch Museum, Oslo, Norway	440
	The Son	1904	Munch Museum, Oslo, Norway	441
	The Coffin is Carried Out	1898–1900	Munch Museum, Oslo, Norway	442
	Boulevard in Paris	1898–1900	Munch Museum, Oslo, Norway	443
	Winter	1899–1900	Private collection	444
	Winter in the Woods, Nordstrand	1899	National Gallery, Oslo, Norway	445
	Death and the Child	1899	Munch Museum, Oslo, Norway	446
	Death and the Child	1899	Kunsthalle Bremen, Germany	447
	Landscape	1899	Munch Museum, Oslo, Norway	448
	The Garden	1899	Munch Museum, Oslo, Norway	449
	Munch's House and Studio in Åsgardstrand	1899	Private collection	450
	Munch's House in Åsgårdstrand	1899	Munch Museum, Oslo, Norway	451
	Dark Spruce Forest	1899	Munch Museum, Oslo, Norway	452
	Dark Spruce Forest	1899	Munch Museum, Oslo, Norway	453
	Dark Spruce Forest	1899	Munch Museum, Oslo, Norway	454
	Dark Spruce Forest	1899–1902	Munch Museum, Oslo, Norway	455
	Dark Spruce Forest	1899–1902	Munch Museum, Oslo, Norway	456
	Aase Nørregaard	1899	National Gallery, Oslo, Norway	457
	Aase and Harald Nørregaard	1899	National Gallery, Oslo, Norway	458
	Summer Night in Studenterlunden	1899	JAPS Collection, Mexico	459
	Dance on the Beach	1899–1900	Národni Galerie, Prague, Czech Republic	460
	Eye in Eye	1899–1900	Munch Museum, Oslo, Norway	461
	Fertility	1899–1900	Private collection	462
	Red and White	1899–1900	Munch Museum, Oslo, Norway	463
	Dance of Life	1899–1900	National Gallery, Oslo, Norway	464
	Golgatha	1900	Munch Museum, Oslo, Norway	465
	Under the Stars	1900–05	Munch Museum, Oslo, Norway	466
	Melancholy	1900–01	Munch Museum, Oslo, Norway	467
	Train Smoke	1900	Munch Museum, Oslo, Norway	468
	Sunset, Nordstrand	1900	Private collection	469
	View from Nordstrand	1900	Private collection	470
	The Island	1900	Private collection	471
	View from Nordstrand	1900–01	Kunsthalle Mannheim, Germany	472
	Winter at Nordstrand	1900–01	Private collection	473
	New Snow	1900–01	Munch Museum, Oslo, Norway	474
	Winter Night	1900–01	Kunsthaus Zürich, Switzerland	475
	Winter Night	1900–01	Munch Museum, Oslo, Norway	476
	White Night	1900–01	National Gallery, Oslo, Norway	477
	Starry Night	1900–01	Museum Folkwang, Essen, Germany	478
	Winter Forest	1900–01	Hamburger Kunsthalle, Hamburg, Germany	479
	Birch in Snow	1901	Private collection	480
	Spring Landscape with Snow Plough	1901	Private collection	481
	Landscape with a Road	1901	Private collection	482
	The Girls on the Bridge	1901	National Gallery, Oslo, Norway	483
	The Girls on the Bridge	1901	Hamburger Kunsthalle, Hamburg, Germany	484
	The Book Family	1901	Thiel Gallery, Stockholm, Sweden	485
	Street in Åsgårdstrand	1901	Kunstmuseum Basel, Switzerland. A gift from Sigrid Schwarz von Spreckelsen og Katharina Schwarz	486
	Street in Åsgårdstrand	1901	Private collection	487
	Street in Åsgårdstrand and a Woman in Red Dress	1901–03	Neue Pinakothek, Munich, Germany	488
	Midsummer Night's Eve	1901–03	Private collection	489
	Street in Åsgårdstrand with Groups of Men and Women	1901–03	Probably lost after 1910	490
	Children Playing in the Street in Åsgårdstrand	1901–03	The Art Museums in Bergen, Norway. Bergen Art Museum (Rasmus Meyer's collection)	491
	Children in the Forest	1901–02	Munch Museum, Oslo, Norway	492
	Forest on the Way to Borre	1901–02	Epstein Family Collection, Washington DC, USA	493
	Two Children on their way to the Fairytale Forest	1901–02	Munch Museum, Oslo, Norway	494
	The Fairytale Forest	1901–02	National Gallery, Oslo, Norway	495
	Forest on the Way to Borre	1901–02	Private collection	496
	Wilhelm Le Fèvre Grimsgaard	1901	Location unknown	497
	Consul Christen Sandberg	1901	Munch Museum, Oslo, Norway	498
	Albert Kollmann	1901–02	Kunsthaus Zürich, Switzerland	499
	Albert Kollmann and Sten Drewsen	1901–02	Hamburger Kunsthalle, Hamburg, Germany	500
	Male Portrait. Herr von R.	1902–04	Location unknown	501
	Marta Sandal	1902	Location unknown	502
	Nude with Long Red Hair	1902	Munch Museum, Oslo, Norway	503
	Nude in Front of the Mirror	1902	Stenersen Museum, Oslo, Norway. A gift from Rolf E. Stenersen to the city of Oslo	504
	Nude with Red Skirt	1902	Munch Museum, Oslo, Norway	505
	Standing Nude	1902	Stenersen Museum, Oslo, Norway. A gift from Rolf E. Stenersen to the city of Oslo	506
	Nude with Her Back Turned	1902	Munch Museum, Oslo, Norway	507
	Morning. Nude at the Window	1902	The Saltzman Family Collection	508
	Nude in Interior	1902	Location unknown	509
	Nude Seated on the Bed	1902	Staatsgalerie Stuttgart, Germany	510
	Two Nudes Standing by a Chest of Drawers	1902–03	Westphalian State Museum of Art and Cultural History, Münster, Germany	511
	Blond and Dark-Haired Nude	1902–03	Location unknown	512
	Seated Nude	1902–03	Munch Museum, Oslo, Norway	513
	Two Nudes	1902–03	National Gallery, Oslo, Norway	514
	Bending and upright Nude	1902–03	Munch Museum, Oslo, Norway	515
	Three Nudes	1902–03	Munch Museum, Oslo, Norway	516
	Seated Nude	1902	Sprengel Museum, Hanover, Germany	517
	Seated Nude	1902	Private collection	518
	The Hearse on Potsdamer Platz	1902	Munch Museum, Oslo, Norway	519
	The Hearse on Potsdamer Platz	1902	Munch Museum, Oslo, Norway	520
	Foster Mothers in Court	1902	Munch Museum, Oslo, Norway	521
	Sanatorium	1902–03	Munch Museum, Oslo, Norway	522
	Jonas Lie with his Family	1902	Munch Museum, Oslo, Norway	523
	Fisherman on a Green Meadow	1902	Munch Museum, Oslo, Norway	524
	Old Fisherman and his Daughter	1902	Städelscher Museums-Verein e.v., Frankfurt a.M.	525
	Fisherman against Yellow Background	1902–03	Gothenburg Municipality, Wernerska villan	526
	Man with Straw Hat	1902–03	Munch Museum, Oslo, Norway	527
	Fertility	1902–03	Munch Museum, Oslo, Norway	528
	Clothes on a Line in Åsgårdstrand	1902	Private collection	529
	The Apple Tree	1902	Private collection	530
	Landscape with Red House	1902–04	Location unknown	531
	Garden	1902–03	Location unknown	532
	House in the Summer Night	1902	Private collection, USA	533
	Stormy Landscape	1902–03	Private collection	534
	The House by the Fjord	1902–05	Private collection	535
	Summer Night by the Beach	1902–03	Private collection	536
	Trees and Garden Wall in Åsgårdstrand	1902–04	Musée d'Orsay, Paris, France	537
	Kiøsterudgården	1902–03	Private collection	538
	The Girls in the Bridge	1902	The Pushkin Museum of Fine Arts, Moscow, Russia	539
	The Girls on the Bridge	1902	Private collection	540
	The Women on the Bridge	1902	The Art Museums in Bergen. Bergen Art Museum (Bergen Billedgalleri)	541
	Aase Nørregaard	1902	Munch Museum, Oslo, Norway	542
	Four Stages of Life	1902	The Art Museums in Bergen. Bergen Art Museum (Rasmus Meyer's collection)	543
	Four Girls in Åsgårdstrand	1902	Staatsgalerie Stuttgart, Germany	544
	Girl with Red Chequered Dress and Red Hat	1902	Von der Heydt-Museum, Wuppertal, Germany	545
	Chopping and Cutting Wood	1902	Location unknown	546
	In the Garden	1902	Private collection	547
	In the Garden	1902	Munch Museum, Oslo, Norway	548
	On the Veranda	1902	National Gallery, Oslo, Norway	549
	On the Operating Table	1902-03	Munch Museum, Oslo, Norway	550
	Children in a Flowery Meadow	1902	Location unknown	551
	Landowner in the Park	1903	Munch Museum, Oslo, Norway	552
	The Swamp	1903	Munch Museum, Oslo, Norway	553
	Landowner in the Park	1903–04	Munch Museum, Oslo, Norway	554
	Bleeding Man and Sunflower	1903	Munch Museum, Oslo, Norway	555
	Self-Portrait in Hell	1903	Munch Museum, Oslo, Norway	556
	Landscape by Travemünde	1903–04	Munch Museum, Oslo, Norway	557
	Spring in Dr. Linde's Garden	1903	Private collection	558
	Gardener in Dr. Linde's Garden	1903	Private collection	559
	Garden in Lübeck	1903	Munch Museum, Oslo, Norway	560
	The Goatcart	1903	Location unknown	561
	Lothar Linde in Red Jacket	1903	Museum für Kunst und Kulturgeschichte der Hansestadt Lübeck, Germany. Behnhaus	562
	Dr. Linde's Sons	1903	Museum für Kunst und Kulturgeschichte der Hansestadt Lübeck, Germany. Behnhaus	563
	Four Girls in Åsgårdstrand	1903	Munch Museum, Oslo, Norway	564
	Four Girls in Åsgårdstrand	1903	Munch Museum, Oslo, Norway	565
	The Women on the Bridge	1903	Private collection	566
	The Women on the Bridge	1903	Thiel Gallery, Stockholm, Sweden	567
	Ingse Vibe	1903	Munch Museum, Oslo, Norway	568
	Spruce Forest	1903	Munch Museum, Oslo, Norway	569
	Church in Travemünde	1903	Private collection	570
	From Travemünde	1903	Museum für Kunst und Kulturgeschichte der Hansestadt Lübeck, Germany. Behnhaus	571
	Sailors in Port	1903	Munch Museum, Oslo, Norway	572
	Brothel Scene	1903	Munch Museum, Oslo, Norway	573
	Merry Company	1903	Munch Museum, Oslo, Norway	574
	Christmas in the Brothel	1903–04	Munch Museum, Oslo, Norway	575
	Harry Graf Kessler	1904	Private collection	576
	Marcel Archinard	1904	Munch Museum, Oslo, Norway	577
	The Frenchman. Marcel Archinard	1904	National Gallery, Oslo, Norway	578
	Hermann Schlittgen	1904	Munch Museum, Oslo, Norway	579
	Summer Night in Studenterlunden	1904	Munch Museum, Oslo, Norway	580
	The Drowning Child	1904?	Munch Museum, Oslo, Norway	581
	Red Rocks by Åsgårdstrand	1904	Munch Museum, Oslo, Norway	582
	Beach with Rocks	1904–05	Munch Museum, Oslo, Norway	583
	Beach	1904	Munch Museum, Oslo, Norway	584
	Beach	1904	Wadsworth Atheneum Museum, Hartford, Connecticut, USA. The Ella Gallup Summer and Mary Catlin Summer Collection Fund	585
	Moonlight on the Beach	1904	Munch Museum, Oslo, Norway	586
	Beach with two Seated Women	1904	The Art Museums in Bergen, Norway. Bergen Art Museum (Rasmus Meyer's collection)	587
	Rowing Boat on the Sea	1904	Private collection	588
	Bathing Young Men	1904	Munch Museum, Oslo, Norway	589
	Bathing Young Men	Approx. 1904	Munch Museum, Oslo, Norway	590
	Bathing Young Men	1904?	Munch Museum, Oslo, Norway	591
	Bathing Boys	1904–05	Private collection	592
	Bathing Boys	1904–05	The Art Museums in Bergen, Norway. Bergen Art Museum (Rasmus Meyer's collection)	593
	Bathing Scene from Åsgårdstrand	1904/1936	Private collection	594
	Venus	1904–05	Stenersen Museum, Oslo, Norway. A gift from Rolf E. Stenersen to the city of Oslo.	595
	House in Borre	1904–05	Private collection	596
	Coastal Landscape	1904	Location unknown	597
	Landscape	1904	Munch Museum, Oslo, Norway	598
	The Garden in Åsgårdstrand	1904–05	Private collection	599
	Fruit harvest	1904–05	Munch Museum, Oslo, Norway	600
	The garden in Sunshine	1904	Location unknown	601
	Two Girls with Blue Aprons	1904–05	Munch Museum, Oslo, Norway	602
	The Funeral	1904–05	Munch Museum, Oslo, Norway	603
	The Women on the Bridge	1904/1927	Munch Museum, Oslo, Norway	604
	Young Woman under the Apple Tree	1904	Carnegie Museum of Art, Pittsburgh, Pennsylvania, USA. Acquired from Mrs. Alan M. Scaife and family	605
	Young Woman among Greenery	1904	Private collection	606
	Summer in the Park (The Linde Frieze)	1904	Munch Museum, Oslo, Norway	607
	Young People on the Beach (The Linde Frieze)	1904	Munch Museum, Oslo, Norway	608
	Trees by the Beach (The Linde Frieze)	1904	Munch Museum, Oslo, Norway	609
	Kissing Couples in the Park (The Linde Frieze)	1904	Munch Museum, Oslo, Norway	610
	Girls picking Fruit (The Linde Frieze)	1904	Munch Museum, Oslo, Norway	611
	Girls watering Flowers (The Linde Frieze)	1904	Munch Museum, Oslo, Norway	612
	Embrace on the Beach (The Linde Frieze)	1904	Private collection	613
	Dance on the Beach (The Linde Frieze)	1904	Munch Museum, Oslo, Norway	614
	Sun Flower (The Linde Frieze)	1904	Probably lost	615
	Hollyhock (The Linde Frieze)	1904	Probably lost	616
	Young Girl in Blue	1904	Private collection	617
	Max Linde	1904	Kunstmuseum Moritzburg Halle (Saale)	618
	Max Linde in Sailing Outfit	1904	Stenersen Museum, Oslo, Norway. A gift from Rolf E. Stenersen to the city of Oslo	619
	Self-Portrait against Two-Coloured Background	1904	Private collection	620
	Self-Portrait with Brushes	1904	Munch Museum, Oslo, Norway	621
	Ellen Warburg	1905	Kunsthaus Zürich, Switzerland	622
	Spring in Åsgårdstrand	1905	Location unknown	623
	Kiøsterudgården in Åsgårdstrand	1905	Private collection	624
	Early Spring	1905	Private collection	625
	Early Spring in Åsgårdstrand	1905	Munch Museum, Oslo, Norway	626
	Spring Landscape	1905	Private collection	627
	Beach Landscape	1905	Private collection	628
	The Road to Borre	1905	Munch Museum, Oslo, Norway	629
	Trees and Torpedo Boat	1905	Munch Museum, Oslo, Norway	630
	Cherry Tree in Blossom	1905	Fram Trust, USA	631
	House in Åsgårdstrand	1905	Location unknown	632
	Cherry Tree in Blossom and Young Girls in the Garden	1905	Munch Museum, Oslo, Norway	633
	Two Young Girls in the Garden	1905	Museum Boijmans van Beuningen, Rotterdam, Netherlands	634
	Ludvig Karsten	1905	Thiel Gallery, Stockholm, Sweden	635
	Beach Landscape with Trees and Boats	1905–06	Munch Museum, Oslo, Norway	636
	Beach Landscape with Trees and Boats	1905–06	Munch Museum, Oslo, Norway	637
	Three Girls in Åsgårdstrand	1905	Thiel Gallery, Stockholm, Sweden	638
	The Girls on the Bridge	1905	Wallraf-Richartz Museum, Cologne, Germany	639
	Two Human Beings. The Lonely Ones	1906-08	Harvard Art Museums: Busch-Reisinger Museum, Cambridge, Massachusetts, USA. Gift of Lynn G. Straus in memory of Philip A. Straus	640
	Taarbæk Harbour	1905	Munch Museum, Oslo, Norway	641
	Garden in Taarbæk	1905	Eric Owen Arneberg	642
	Caricature Portrait of Henrik Lund	1905	Munch Museum, Oslo, Norway	643
	Original Man	1905	Munch Museum, Oslo, Norway	644
	Self-Portrait against a Green Background (left)	1905	Munch Museum, Oslo, Norway	645
	Caricature Portrait of Tulla Larsen (right)	1905	Munch Museum, Oslo, Norway	646
	Head by Head	1905	Munch Museum, Oslo, Norway	647
	Head by Head	1905	Munch Museum, Oslo, Norway	648
	Self-Portrait with Moustache and Starched Collar	1905	National Gallery, Oslo, Norway	649
	Self-Portrait in Broad Brimmed Hat	1905–06	Munch Museum, Oslo, Norway	650
	Esche's Children	1905	Kunsthaus Zürich, Switzerland. Eigentum der Herbert Eugen Esche-Stiftung	651
	Edmute Esche with Doll	1905	Private collection	652
	Hans Herbert Esche with Nanny	1905	Location unknown	653
	Edmute Esche	1905	Kunsthaus Zürich, Switzerland. Eigentum der Herbert Eugen Esche-Stiftung	654
	Hanni Esche	1905	Probably lost	655
	Hanni Esche	1905	Bavarian State Picture Collection, Neue Pinakothek, Munich, Germany. On loan from a private collection	656
	Herbert Esche	1905	Kunsthaus Zürich, Switzerland. Eigentum der Herbert Eugen Esche-Stiftung	657
	Herbert Esche	1905	Kunsthaus Zurich, Switzerland. Eigentum der Herbert Eugen Esche-Stiftung	658
	View across Chemnitzal	1905	Kunsthaus Zürich, Switzerland. Eigentum der Herbert Eugen Esche-Stiftung	659
	From Thüringerwald	1905	Munch Museum, Oslo, Norway	660
	Elgersburg	1905	Munch Museum, Oslo, Norway	661
	Road in Thüringen	1905	Munch Museum, Oslo, Norway	662
	From Thüringerwald	1905	Private collection, Dallas	663
	Card Players in Elgersburg	1905	Munch Museum, Oslo, Norway	664
	Woman with Sick Child. Inheritance	1905–06	Munch Museum, Oslo, Norway	665
	Drinkers	1906	Munch Museum, Oslo, Norway	666
	Charwomen at the Mutiger Ritter Hotel in Kösen	1906	Munch Museum, Oslo, Norway	667
	Charwomen on the Stairs	1906	Munch Museum, Oslo, Norway	668
	Winter Landscape, Thüringen	1906	The Art Museums in Bergen, Norway. Bergen Art Museum (Stenersen's collection)	669
	Snow Landscape, Thüringen	1906	Thiel Gallery, Stockholm, Sweden	670
	Snow Landscape, Thüringen	1906	Von der Heydt Museum, Wuppertal, Germany	671
	Snow Landscape, Thüringen	1906	Private collection	672
	Winter. Elgersburg	1906	Munch Museum, Oslo, Norway	673
	Small Town Street in Snow	1906	Sprengel Museum, Hannover, Germany	674
	Children and Ducks	1906	Munch Museum, Oslo, Norway	675
	New Snow in the Avenue	1906	Munch Museum, Oslo, Norway	676
	Children on the Street	1906	Munch Museum, Oslo, Norway	677
	Mother with Children, Thüringen	1906	Private collection	678
	Mothers with Children, Thüringen	1906	Private collection	679
	The Oak	1906	Thiel Gallery, Stockholm, Sweden	680
	Chestnut Trees	1906	Munch Museum, Oslo, Norway	681
	Park	1906	Munch Museum, Oslo, Norway	682
	Park in Kösen	1906	Private collection	683
	Park in Kösen	1906	Österreichische Galerie Belvedere, Wien, Austria	684
	Park Landscape	1906	Munch Museum, Oslo, Norway	685
	Felix Auerbach	1906	Location unknown	686
	Self-Portrait against Red Background	1906	Munch Museum, Oslo, Norway	687
	Self-Portrait With a Bottle of Wine	1906	Munch Museum, Oslo, Norway	688
	Friedrich Nietzsche	1906	Munch Museum, Oslo, Norway	689
	Friedrich Nietzsche	1906	Thiel Gallery, Stockholm, Sweden	690
	Friedrich Nietzsche	1906	Munch Museum, Oslo, Norway	691
	Elisabeth Förster-Nietzsche	1906	Munch Museum, Oslo, Norway	692
	Elisabeth Förster-Nietzsche	1906	Thiel Gallery, Stockholm, Sweden	693
	Albert Kollmann	1906	Munch Museum, Oslo, Norway	694
	Harry Graf Kessler	1906	Stenersen Museum, Oslo, Norway. A gift from Rolf E. Stenersen to the city of Oslo	695
	Harry Graf Kessler	1906	Neue Nationalgalerie, Berlin, Germany	696
	Mrs. Schwarz	1906	The Art Museums in Bergen. Bergen Art Museum (Rasmus Meyer's collection)	697
	Mrs. Schwarz	1906	National Gallery, Oslo, Norway	698
	Set Design for Henrik Ibsen's Ghosts	1906	Munch Museum, Oslo, Norway	699
	Set Design for Henrik Ibsen's Ghosts	1906	Kunstmuseum Basel, Switzerland	700
	Set Design for Henrik Ibsen's Ghosts	1906	Location unknown	701
	Set Design for Henrik Ibsen's Ghosts	1906	Munch Museum, Oslo, Norway	702
	Set Design for Henrik Ibsen's Ghosts	1906	Munch Museum, Oslo, Norway	703
	Set Design for Henrik Ibsen's Ghosts	1906	Location unknown	704
	Set Design for Henrik Ibsen's Ghosts	1906	Munch Museum, Oslo, Norway	705
	Set Design for Henrik Ibsen's Ghosts	1906	Galleri Faurschou, Copenhagen, Denmark	706
	Set Design for Henrik Ibsen's Ghosts	1906	The Art Museums in Bergen, Norway. Bergen Art Museum (Stenersen's collection)	707
	Set Design for Henrik Ibsen's Ghosts	1906	Private collection	708
	Set Design for Henrik Ibsen's Ghosts	1906	Munch Museum, Oslo, Norway	709
	Set Design for Henrik Ibsen's Ghosts	1906	Location unknown	710
	Fjord Landscape. Set Design for Henrik Ibsen's Ghosts	1906	Munch Museum, Oslo, Norway	711
	Woman	1906–07	Munch Museum, Oslo, Norway	712
	Woman in White Sitting on the Beach	1906–07	Munch Museum, Oslo, Norway	713
	Melancholy. Weeping Woman on the Beach	1906	Munch Museum, Oslo, Norway	714
	Three Seated Young Women	1906–07	Munch Museum, Oslo, Norway	715
	Kiss	1906–07	Stenersen Museum. A gift from Rolf E. Stenersen to the city of Oslo	716
	Separation	1906–07	Munch Museum, Oslo, Norway	717
	Woman Picking Fruit	1906–07	Munch Museum, Oslo, Norway	718
	Two Women on the Road	1906–09	Munch Museum, Oslo, Norway	719
	Dance by the Sea	1906–07	Munch Museum, Oslo, Norway	720
	Desire	1906–07	Munch Museum, Oslo, Norway	721
	Moonlight on the Beach	1906–07	Munch Museum, Oslo, Norway	722
	By the Sea	1906–07	Private collection	723
	Groups of People on the Beach	1906	Probably lost	724
	Moonlight on the Sea (The Reinhardt Frieze)	1906–07	Neue Nationalgalerie, Berlin, Germany	725
	Two Young Women in Red and White (The Reinhardt Frieze)	1906–07	Neue Nationalgalerie, Berlin, Germany	726
	Trees by the Sea (The Reinhardt Frieze)	1906–07	Neue Nationalgalerie, Berlin, Germany	727
	Summer Night (The Reinhardt Frieze)	1906–07	Neue Nationalgalerie, Berlin, Germany	728
	Desire (The Reinhardt Frieze)	1906–07	Neue Nationalgalerie, Berlin, Germany	729
	Dance on the Beach (The Reinhardt Frieze)	1906–07	Private collection	730
	Kiss on the Beach (The Reinhardt Frieze)	1906–07	Neue Nationalgalerie, Berlin, Germany	731
	Young Women Picking Fruit (The Reinhardt Frieze)	1906–07	Neue Nationalgalerie, Berlin, Germany	732
	Sun Flower (The Reinhardt Frieze)	1906–07	Neue Nationalgalerie, Berlin, Germany	733
	Young Women on the Beach (The Reinhardt Frieze)	1906–07	Hamburger Kunsthalle, Hamburg, Germany	734
	Two Human Beings. The Lonely ones (The Reinhardt Frieze)	1906–07	Museum Folkwang, Essen, Germany	735
	Melancholy (The Reinhardt Frieze)	1906–07	Neue Nationalgalerie, Berlin, Germany	736
	Set Design for Henrik Ibsen's "Hedda Gabler"	1906–07	Munch Museum, Oslo, Norway	737
	Set Design for Henrik Ibsen's "Hedda Gabler"	1906–07	Munch Museum, Oslo, Norway	738
	Set Design for Henrik Ibsen's "Hedda Gabler"	1906–07	Munch Museum, Oslo, Norway	739
	Woman Standing in the Doorway	1906–07	Munch Museum, Oslo, Norway	740
	Murder	1906	Munch Museum, Oslo, Norway	741
	The Murderess	1906	Munch Museum, Oslo, Norway	742
	The Death of Marat	1906–07	Munch Museum, Oslo, Norway	743
	Walther Rathenau	1907	Stiftung Stadtmuseum Berlin, Germany. Acquired with support from Siemens Kunstfond	744
	Walther Rathenau	1907	The Art Museums in Bergen, Norway. Bergen Art Museum (Rasmus Meyer's collection)	745
	Ernest Thiel	1907	Thiel Gallery, Stockholm, Sweden	746
	Ernest Thiel	1907	Thiel Gallery, Stockholm, Sweden	747
	The Harbour in Lübeck	1907	Kunsthaus Zürich, Switzerland	748
	The Coast near Lübeck	1907	National Gallery in Prague, Czech Republic	749
	Lübeck with the Holstentor	1907	Neue Nationalgalerie, Berlin, Germany	750
	Rodin's "Le Penseur" in Dr. Linde's Garden	1907	Musée Rodin, Paris, France	751
	Self-Portrait in Profile	1907	Munch Museum, Oslo, Norway	752
	Female Portrait	1907	Munch Museum, Oslo, Norway	753
	Portrait of an Old Man	1907	Munch Museum, Oslo, Norway	754
	Old Man in Warnemünde	1907	Munch Museum, Oslo, Norway	755
	Boy from Warnemünde	1907	Private collection	756
	Street in Warnemünde	1907	Munch Museum, Oslo, Norway	757
	Women and Children in Warnemünde	1907	Munch Museum, Oslo, Norway	758
	The Drowned Boy	1907–08	Munch Museum, Oslo, Norway	759
	Worker and Child	1907	Munch Museum, Oslo, Norway	760
	Mason and Mechanic	1907–08	Munch Museum, Oslo, Norway	761
	Bath	1907	Private collection	762
	Bathing Men	1907	Munch Museum, Oslo, Norway	763
	Bathing Men	1907	Österreichische Galerie Belvedere, Wien, Austria	764
	Bathing Men	1907	Munch Museum, Oslo, Norway	765
	Bathing Men	1907–08	Ateneum, Helsinki, Finland	766
	The Death of Marat	1907	Munch Museum, Oslo, Norway	767
	The Death of Marat	1907	Munch Museum, Oslo, Norway	768
	Cupid and Psyche	1907	Munch Museum, Oslo, Norway	769
	Consolation	1907	Munch Museum, Oslo, Norway	770
	Woman with Children	1907	Munch Museum, Oslo, Norway	771
	Cupido	1907	Munch Museum, Oslo, Norway	772
	Weeping Woman	1907	Munch Museum, Oslo, Norway	773
	Weeping Woman	1907	Munch Museum, Oslo, Norway	774
	Weeping Woman	1907–09	The Art Museums in Bergen, Norway. Bergen Art Museum (Stenersen's collection)	775
	Weeping Woman	1907	Munch Museum, Oslo, Norway	776
	Weeping Woman	1907–09	Munch Museum, Oslo, Norway	777
	Rosa Meissner	1907	Hiroshima Museum of Art, Japan	778
	Olga and Rosa Meissner	1907	The Art Museums in Bergen, Norway. Bergen Art Museum (Rasmus Meyer's collection)	779
	Olga and Rosa Meissner	1907	Munch Museum, Oslo, Norway	780
	Zum Süssen Mädel	1907	Munch Museum, Oslo, Norway	781
	Taken by Surprise	1907	Munch Museum, Oslo, Norway	782
	Jealousy	1907	Munch Museum, Oslo, Norway	783
	Jealousy	1907?	Munch Museum, Oslo, Norway	784
	Desire	1907	Munch Museum, Oslo, Norway	785
	The Murderess	1907	Munch Museum, Oslo, Norway	786
	Hatred	1907	Munch Museum, Oslo, Norway	787
	Jealousy	1907?	Munch Museum, Oslo, Norway	788
	Man and Woman on the Beach	1907	Munch Museum, Oslo, Norway	789
	The Sick Child	1907	Thiel Gallery, Stockholm, Sweden	790
	The Sick Child	1907	Tate Modern, London, England	791
	Kristiania Bohemians	1907?	Munch Museum, Oslo, Norway	792
	Canal in Warnemünde	1908	Munch Museum, Oslo, Norway	793
	Am Strom, Warnemünde	1908	Munch Museum, Oslo, Norway	794
	Three Small Girls on the Beach	1908	Munch Museum, Oslo, Norway	795
	Canal In Warnemünde	1908	Munch Museum, Oslo, Norway	796
	Canal in Warnemünde	1908	Munch Museum, Oslo, Norway	797
	Trees by the Canal	1908	Munch Museum, Oslo, Norway	798
	Attraction in the Landscape	1908	Munch Museum, Oslo, Norway	799
	Head by Head in Landscape	1908	Munch Museum, Oslo, Norway	800
	Canal at Sunset	1908	Munch Museum, Oslo, Norway	801
	Canal with Dark Clouds	1908	Munch Museum, Oslo, Norway	802
	Self-Portrait against a Blue Sky	1908	Munch Museum, Oslo, Norway	803
	Study of a Young Man's Head	1908	Munch Museum, Oslo, Norway	804
	Seascape from Warnemünde	1908	Munch Museum, Oslo, Norway	805
	Waves	1908	Munch Museum, Oslo, Norway	806
	Waves	1908	Munch Museum, Oslo, Norway	807
	Young Man on the Beach	1908	Munch Museum, Oslo, Norway	808
	Young Man on the Beach	1908	Munch Museum, Oslo, Norway	809
	Young Man on the Beach	1908	Munch Museum, Oslo, Norway	810
	Youth	1908	Munch Museum, Oslo, Norway	811
	Old Age	1908	Munch Museum, Oslo, Norway	812
	Childhood	1908	Munch Museum, Oslo, Norway	813
	Childhood	1908	Munch Museum, Oslo, Norway	814
	Old Man	1908	Munch Museum, Oslo, Norway	815
	Old Man	1908–11	Munch Museum, Oslo, Norway	816
	Bathers	1908–11	Munch Museum, Oslo, Norway	817
	Gustav Schiefler	1908	Private collection	818
	Gustav Schiefler	1908	Ateneum, Helsinki, Finland	819
	Daniel Jacobsen	1908	Statens Museum for Kunst, Copenhagen, Denmark	820
	Daniel Jacobsen	1908–09	Munch Museum, Oslo, Norway	821
	Daniel Jacobsen	1908–09	Munch Museum, Oslo, Norway	822
	Helge Rode	1908	Munch Museum, Oslo, Norway	823
	Helge Rode	1908	Moderna Museet, Stockholm, Sweden	824
	Self-Portrait in the Clinic	1909	The Art Museums in Bergen, Norway. Bergen Art Museum (Rasmus Meyer's collection)	825
	Nurses Holding a Sheet	1909	Location unknown	826
	Pernille Kirkeby	1909	Private collection	827
	Pernille Kirkeby	1909	Private collection	828
	Weeping Woman	1909	Westphalian State Museum of Art and Cultural History, Münster, Germany	829
	Spring in Kragerø	1909	Munch Museum, Oslo, Norway	830
	Prams under High Trees	1909–10	Munch Museum, Oslo, Norway	831
	Jappe Nilssen	1909	Munch Museum, Oslo, Norway	832
	Jappe Nilssen	1909	Munch Museum, Oslo, Norway	833
	Torvald Stang	1909	Munch Museum, Oslo, Norway	834
	Ludvig Ravensberg	1909	Munch Museum, Oslo, Norway	835
	Christian Gierløff	1909	Gothenburg Museum of Art, Sweden	836
	Jens Thiis	1909	Munch Museum, Oslo, Norway	837
	Torvald Stang and Edvard Munch	1909–11	Munch Museum, Oslo, Norway	838
	Sigurd Høst	1909–11	Private collection	839
	Adam and Eve	1909?	Munch Museum, Oslo, Norway	840
	Adam and Eve	1909	Munch Museum, Oslo, Norway	841
	Garden in Kragerø	1909	Munch Museum, Oslo, Norway	842
	Trees by the Sea	1909–12	Munch Museum, Oslo, Norway	843
	Garden in Kragerø	1909	Private collection	844
	Two Women under a Tree	1909–12	Munch Museum, Oslo, Norway	845
	Sigurd Slembe	1909	Munch Museum, Oslo, Norway	846
	Sitting on a Cloud (Norwegian: "Deilig er jorden")	1909	Munch Museum, Oslo, Norway	847
	Village by the Sea	1909–11	Munch Museum, Oslo, Norway	848
	Ship Being Scrapped	1909–11	Kunsthaus Zürich, Switzerland. A gift from Alfred Rütschi in 1929	849
	Ship being Scrapped	1909–11	Munch Museum, Oslo, Norway	850
	Dance	1909–11	Munch Museum, Oslo, Norway	851
	People Gathering around a Man in Red	1909–11	Munch Museum, Oslo, Norway	852
	Nude Figures on the Beach	1909–11	Munch Museum, Oslo, Norway	853
	Woman Hurrying Downwards	1909–11	Munch Museum, Oslo, Norway	854
	Henrik Ibsen at the Grand Café	1909–10	Munch Museum, Oslo, Norway	855
	Jonas Lie with his Family	1909	Munch Museum, Oslo, Norway	856
	Bjørnstjerne Bjørnson Speaking to the People	1909	Munch Museum, Oslo, Norway	857
	Bjørnstjerne Bjørnson Speaking to the People	1909	Munch Museum, Oslo, Norway	858
	Geniuses: Ibsen, Nietzsche and Socrates	1909	Munch Museum, Oslo, Norway	859
	The Geniuses	1909	Munch Museum, Oslo, Norway	860
	Medicine	1909	Munch Museum, Oslo, Norway	861
	Old Man Sitting under a Tree	1909	Munch Museum, Oslo, Norway	862
	The Human Mountain	1909	Munch Museum, Oslo, Norway	863
	Astronomy, History and Geography	1909	Munch Museum, Oslo, Norway	864
	Astronomy	1909	Munch Museum, Oslo, Norway	865
	Astronomy	1909	Munch Museum, Oslo, Norway	866
	Geography	1909	Munch Museum, Oslo, Norway	867
	Death and Crystallization	1909	Munch Museum, Oslo, Norway	868
	Physics	1909	Munch Museum, Oslo, Norway	869
	Chemistry	1909	Munch Museum, Oslo, Norway	870
	Chemistry	1909	Munch Museum, Oslo, Norway	871
	The Beggar	1909–10	Munch Museum, Oslo, Norway	872
	Workers in Snow	1909–10	Munch Museum, Oslo, Norway	873
	Workers in Snow	1910	Private collection; on loan to The National Museum of Western Art, Tokyo, Japan	874
	Galloping Horse	1910–12	Munch Museum, Oslo, Norway	875
	Walking in Snow	1910–12	Munch Museum, Oslo, Norway	876
	Sailors in Snow	1910–12	Munch Museum, Oslo, Norway	877
	People and Timber Transport in a Kragerø Street	1910–12	Munch Museum, Oslo, Norway	878
	Man with a Sledge	1910–12	Munch Museum, Oslo, Norway	879
	Uphill with a Sledge	1910–12	Munch Museum, Oslo, Norway	880
	Black and Yellow Man in Snow	1910–12	Munch Museum, Oslo, Norway	881
	Børre by the Window	1910–11	Munch Museum, Oslo, Norway	882
	Børre Eriksen	1910–11	Munch Museum, Oslo, Norway	883
	Børre Eriksen	1910–11	Munch Museum, Oslo, Norway	884
	Old Fisherman on Snow-covered Coast	1910–11	Munch Museum, Oslo, Norway	885
	Ship's Deck in Storm	1910–12	Munch Museum, Oslo, Norway	886
	Winter Landscape from Kragerø	1910	Stenersen Museum, Oslo, Norway. A gift from Rolf E. Stenersen to the city of Oslo	887
	Snowstorm by the Sea	1910–12	Munch Museum, Oslo, Norway	888
	Winter by the Sea	1910–13	Munch Museum, Oslo, Norway	889
	Winter in Kragerø	1910–12	Munch Museum, Oslo, Norway	890
	Spring Work in the Skerries	1910	Munch Museum, Oslo, Norway	891
	Spring Work in the Skerries	1910–14	Munch Museum, Oslo, Norway	892
	Children in the Street	1910–15	Munch Museum, Oslo, Norway	893
	The House in the Skerries	1910–15	Munch Museum, Oslo, Norway	894
	Train Smoke	1910	Harvard Art Museums: Busch-Reisinger Museum, Cambridge, Massachusetts, USA	895
	The Scream	1910?	Munch Museum, Oslo, Norway	896
	Groups of People on the Beach	1910	Munch Museum, Oslo, Norway	897
	Youth	1910	Museum Folkwang, Essen, Germany	898
	Fruit Trees in Blossom	1910–11	Munch Museum, Oslo, Norway	899
	Trees and Buttercups	1910–11	Location unknown	900
	Young Woman and Buttercups	1910	Private collection	901
	Children on the Crag	1910	Munch Museum, Oslo, Norway	902
	Street in Kragerø	1910	Munch Museum, Oslo, Norway	903
	Street in Kragerø	1910–11	Private collection, South America	904
	Rain at the Coast	1910–11	Munch Museum, Oslo, Norway	905
	The Murderer	1910	Munch Museum, Oslo, Norway	906
	Road near Kragerø	1910–11	Munch Museum, Oslo, Norway	907
	Nude Couple on the Beach	1910–16	Munch Museum, Oslo, Norway	908
	Two Old Men	1910	Waldemarsudde, Stockholm, Sweden	909
	Ida Roede	1910	Lillehammer Art Museum, Norway. Einar Lunde's collection	910
	The Human Mountain	1909–10	Munch Museum, Oslo, Norway	911
	The Human Mountain	1909–10	Munch Museum, Oslo, Norway	912
	The Human Mountain	1909–10	Munch Museum, Oslo, Norway	913
	The Human Mountain	1909–10	Munch Museum, Oslo, Norway	914
	Old Men in Sun Light	1909–10	Munch Museum, Oslo, Norway	915
	Naked Old Man	1909–10	Munch Museum, Oslo, Norway	916
	History	1909–10	The University of Oslo	917
	History	1910	Munch Museum, Oslo, Norway	918
	History	1910–11	Munch Museum, Oslo, Norway	919
	History	1910	Munch Museum, Oslo, Norway	920
	History: Study for the Old Man	1910	Munch Museum, Oslo, Norway	921
	History: Study for the Old Man	1910	Munch Museum, Oslo, Norway	922
	History: Study for the Old Man and Two Boys	1910	Munch Museum, Oslo, Norway	923
	The Source	1910	Munch Museum, Oslo, Norway	924
	The Tree of Life	1910	Munch Museum, Oslo, Norway	925
	The Sun and Awakening Nude Men	1910–11	Munch Museum, Oslo, Norway	926
	The Sun	1910	Munch Museum, Oslo, Norway	927
	People in Sunshine	1910	Munch Museum, Oslo, Norway	928
	People in Sunshine	1910	Munch Museum, Oslo, Norway	929
	Wandering towards the Light	1910	Munch Museum, Oslo, Norway	930
	Seated Naked Man	1910	Munch Museum, Oslo, Norway	931
	The Tree of Life	1910	Munch Museum, Oslo, Norway	932
	The Tree of Life	1910	Munch Museum, Oslo, Norway	933
	The Tree of Life: Left Part	1910	Munch Museum, Oslo, Norway	934
	The Tree of Life: Right Part	1910	Munch Museum, Oslo, Norway	935
	Life: Left Part	1910	Munch Museum, Oslo, Norway	936
	Life Right Part	1910	Munch Museum, Oslo, Norway	937
	Life	1910	Oslo City Hall	938
	Harvesting Women	1910–14	Munch Museum, Oslo, Norway	939
	Nude Woman Stretching her Arms in the Air	1910–11	Munch Museum, Oslo, Norway	940
	Harvesting Women	1910–11	Munch Museum, Oslo, Norway	941
	Harvesting Women	1910–11		942
	Standing Naked Man. The Source	1910–11	Munch Museum, Oslo, Norway	943
	The Source	1910–11	Munch Museum, Oslo, Norway	944
	New Rays	1910–13	Munch Museum, Oslo, Norway	945
	New Rays	1910–11	Munch Museum, Oslo, Norway	946
	Chemistry	1910–11	Munch Museum, Oslo, Norway	947
	Chemistry	1910–11	Munch Museum, Oslo, Norway	948
	Woman with Children	1910	Munch Museum, Oslo, Norway	949
	The Researchers	1910	Munch Museum, Oslo, Norway	950
	The Researchers	1910	Munch Museum, Oslo, Norway	951
	The Researchers: Study for a Seated Boy	1910	Munch Museum, Oslo, Norway	952
	The Sun	1910	Munch Museum, Oslo, Norway	953
	The Sun	1910–12	Munch Museum, Oslo, Norway	954
	The Sun	1910–13	Munch Museum, Oslo, Norway	955
	The Sun	1910–13	Munch Museum, Oslo, Norway	956
	The Sun	1910–13	Munch Museum, Oslo, Norway	957
	The Sun	1910–11	MUNCH, Bjørvika, Oslo, Norway	958
	History	1910–11	Munch Museum, Oslo, Norway	959
	The Researchers	1910–11	Munch Museum, Oslo, Norway	960
	The Researchers: Left Part with Playing children	1910	Munch Museum, Oslo, Norway	961
	The Researchers: Central Group with Alma Mater	1910	Munch Museum, Oslo, Norway	962
	The Researchers: Right Part with Sitting Boy	1910	Munch Museum, Oslo, Norway	963
	The Researchers: Group of Children Standing	1910–14	Munch Museum, Oslo, Norway	964
	The Researchers: Boy Lying on his Stomach	1910–14	Munch Museum, Oslo, Norway	965
	The Researchers: Group of Children Standing	1910–14	Munch Museum, Oslo, Norway	966
	The Researchers: Children's Feet	1910–14	Munch Museum, Oslo, Norway	967
	History	1911/1914-16	University of Oslo, The Aula	968
	The Researchers	1911/1925-27?	Munch Museum, Oslo, Norway	969
	The Sun	1911	University of Oslo, The Aula	970
	The Pathfinder	1911	Probably lost	971
	The Sower	1911	Probably lost	972
	Young Woman Walking towards the Sun	1911	Probably lost	973
	Young Man Walking towards the Sun	1911	Probably lost	974
	Men Turning towards the Sun	1911–14	Munch Museum, Oslo, Norway	975
	Women Turning towards the Sun	1911–14	Munch Museum, Oslo, Norway	976
	The Pathfinder	1911–12	Munch Museum, Oslo, Norway	977
	Melancholy	1911	Stenersen Museum, Oslo, Norway. A gift from Rolf E. Stenersen to the city of Oslo	978
	Man and Woman by the Window with Potted Plants	1911	Munch Museum, Oslo, Norway	979
	Large and Small Dog	1911–12	Munch Museum, Oslo, Norway	980
	Two Dogs	1911–12	Malmö Art Museum, Sweden	981
	Two Boys on the Beach	1911	Private collection	982
	Pine Trees by the Sea	1911–13	Munch Museum, Oslo, Norway	983
	Pine Trees and Fruit Trees in Blossom	1911	Munch Museum, Oslo, Norway	984
	Pine Trees and Fruit Trees in Blossom	1911	Munch Museum, Oslo, Norway	985
	Pine Trees and Fruit Trees in Blossom	1911	Munch Museum, Oslo, Norway	986
	Morning in the Garden	1911–12	Munch Museum, Oslo, Norway	987
	Waves against the Shore	1911–12	Munch Museum, Oslo, Norway	988
	Beach Study	1911–12	Munch Museum, Oslo, Norway	989
	Buding Leaves	1911–15	Private collection	990
	Geese in the Garden	1911	Collectión Carmen Thyssen-Bornemisza en depósito en el Museo Thyssen-Bornemisza, Madrid, Spain	991
	Self-Portrait with Hands under Cheek	1911	Munch Museum, Oslo, Norway	992
	Ingeborg Kaurin	1911–12	Munch Museum, Oslo, Norway	993
	Ingeborg Kaurin	1911–12	Munch Museum, Oslo, Norway	994
	Summer in Kragerø	1911	Private collection	995
	Horse in Landscape	1912	Private collection	996
	Winter in Kragerø	1912	Munch Museum, Oslo, Norway	997
	Snow Landscape from Kragerø	1912	Fram Trust, USA	998
	Snow Landscape from Kragerø	1912	Private collection	999
	Felled Trees	1912	Private collection	1000
	Felling Area	1912	Private collection	1001
	The Yellow Log	1912	Munch Museum, Oslo, Norway	1002
	Forest in Snow	1912	Munch Museum, Oslo, Norway	1003
	Forest	1912	Location unknown	1004
	Houese in Kragerø	1912	Location unknown	1005
	Kragerø in Spring	1912	Munch Museum, Oslo, Norway	1006
	Avenue in Kragerø	1912–13	Private collection	1007
	Landscape from Kragerø	1912	The Metropolitan Museum of Art, New York City, New York, USA. Bequest of Scotfield Thayer, 1982	1008
	Ingeborg Kaurin	1912	Munch Museum, Oslo, Norway	1009
	Ingeborg in Green	1912	Museum of Fine Arts, Boston, Massachusetts, USA. Tompkins Collection – Arthur Gordon Tompkins Fund	1010
	Footbath	1912–13	Munch Museum, Oslo, Norway	1011
	Footbath	1912–13	Munch Museum, Oslo, Norway	1012
	Model in Green and Blue	1912–15	Munch Museum, Oslo, Norway	1013
	Ingeborg with her Arms behind her Back	1912–13	Munch Museum, Oslo, Norway	1014
	Two Sisters	1912–13	Munch Museum, Oslo, Norway	1015
	Old Man in an Interior	1912–13	Munch Museum, Oslo, Norway	1016
	Jensen with a Duck	1912	Private collection	1017
	Jensen with Slaughtered Duck	1912	Munch Museum, Oslo, Norway	1018
	The Sun	1912	Munch Museum, Oslo, Norway	1019
	The Sun	1912–13	Munch Museum, Oslo, Norway	1020
	Alma Mater	1912–13	Munch Museum, Oslo, Norway	1021
	History	1912–13	Munch Museum, Oslo, Norway	1022
	Women Turned towards the Sun	1912–13	Munch Museum, Oslo, Norway	1023
	The Source	1912–13	Munch Museum, Oslo, Norway	1024
	Men Turned towards the Sun	1912–13	Munch Museum, Oslo, Norway	1025
	Harvesting Women	1912–13	Munch Museum, Oslo, Norway	1026
	Chemistry	1912–13	Munch Museum, Oslo, Norway	1027
	New Rays	1912–13	Munch Museum, Oslo, Norway	1028
	The Sower	1912–13	Munch Museum, Oslo, Norway	1029
	The Sower	1912–13	Munch Museum, Oslo, Norway	1030
	The Pathfinder	1912–13	Munch Museum, Oslo, Norway	1031
	The Pathfinder	1912–13	Munch Museum, Oslo, Norway	1032
	Boy in Rocky Landscape	1912–15	Detroit Institute of Arts‚ Michigan, USA	1033
	Alma Mater: Portrait Study	1912–14	Munch Museum, Oslo, Norway	1034
	Alma Mater: Study	1912–14	Munch Museum, Oslo, Norway	1035
	Alma Mater: Study	1912–14	Munch Museum, Oslo, Norway	1036
	Alma Mater	1912–14	Munch Museum, Oslo, Norway	1037
	Alma Mater: Study	1912–14	Munch Museum, Oslo, Norway	1038
	Ducks and Turkeys in Snow	1913	The Art Museums in Bergen, Norway. Bergen Art Museum (Stenersen's collection)	1039
	Turkeys	1913	Munch Museum, Oslo, Norway	1040
	Ducks in Snow	1913	Location unknown	1041
	Turkey	1913	Location unknown	1042
	The Sower	1913	Private collection	1043
	Standing Woman with Arms Folded	1913–15	Stenersen Museum, Oslo, Norway. A gift from Rolf E. Stenersen to the city of Oslo	1044
	St. Bernhard Dog in Snow	1913–15	Munch Museum, Oslo, Norway	1045
	St. Bernhard Dog in Snow	1913–15	Munch Museum, Oslo, Norway	1046
	In the Kennel	1913–15	Munch Museum, Oslo, Norway	1047
	Snow	1913–15	Location unknown	1048
	From Jeløya	1913–15	Munch Museum, Oslo, Norway	1049
	From Jeløya	1913–15	Munch Museum, Oslo, Norway	1050
	From Jeløya	1913–15	Location unknown	1051
	Junipers by the Coast	1913–15	Munch Museum, Oslo, Norway	1052
	Green Tree by the Road	1913?	Munch Museum, Oslo, Norway	1053
	Yellow and Green Tree	1913–16	Munch Museum, Oslo, Norway	1054
	Street in Kragerø	1913	Kunsthalle Bielefeld, Germany. On permanent loan from Staff Stiftung, Lemgo	1055
	Self-Portrait with Hat	1913	Munch Museum, Oslo, Norway	1056
	Christian and Hjørdis Gierløff	1913–14	Munch Museum, Oslo, Norway	1057
	Christian and Hjørdis Gierløff	1913–14	Epstein Family Collection, Washington DC, USA	1058
	Käte Perls	1913	Munch Museum, Oslo, Norway	1059
	Käte Perls	1913	Munch Museum, Oslo, Norway	1060
	Käte Perls	1913	Kunstmuseum Basel, Switzerland	1061
	Käte and Hugo Perls	1913	Munch Museum, Oslo, Norway	1062
	Käte and Hugo Perls	1913	de:Kunstsammlungen Chemnitz	1063
	Elsa Glaser	1913	Munch Museum, Oslo, Norway	1064
	Elsa and Curt Glaser	1913	Location unknown	1065
	Elsa Glaser	1913	Kunsthaus Zürich, Switzerland	1066
	Irmgard Steinbart	1913	Mildred Lane Kemper Art Museum, Washington University in St. Louis, Missouri, USA. Gift of Morton J. May, 1968	1067
	Irmgard Steinbart	1913	Munch Museum, Oslo, Norway	1068
	The Seducer	1913	Munch Museum, Oslo, Norway	1069
	The Seducer	1913	Munch Museum, Oslo, Norway	1070
	Naked Man and Woman	Ca. 1913–15	Munch Museum, Oslo, Norway	1071
	Seated on a Suitcase	1913–15	Munch Museum, Oslo, Norway	1072
	Beneath the Red Apples	1913–15	Munch Museum, Oslo, Norway	1073
	Man and Woman	1913–15	Munch Museum, Oslo, Norway	1074
	Man and Woman	1913–15	Munch Museum, Oslo, Norway	1075
	Man and Woman	1913–15	Munch Museum, Oslo, Norway	1076
	Jealousy	1913	Städel Museum, Frankfurt am Main, Germany. On loan from a private collection	1077
	Jealousy	1913–15	Munch Museum, Oslo, Norway	1078
	Jealousy	1913–15	Munch Museum, Oslo, Norway	1079
	Old Man with Naked Woman on his Lap	1913–15	Munch Museum, Oslo, Norway	1080
	The Secret	1913	Munch Museum, Oslo, Norway	1081
	On the Sofa	1913	Munch Museum, Oslo, Norway	1082
	Seated Nude	1913	National Gallery, Oslo, Norway	1083
	Seated Nude	1913–14	Munch Museum, Oslo, Norway	1084
	Morning Yawn	1913	The Art Museums in Bergen, Norway. Bergen Art Museum (Stenersen's collection)	1085
	Boy Lying on his Stomach	1913	Munch Museum, Oslo, Norway	1086
	Reclining Nude	1913–14	Kunsthalle Hamburg, Germany	1087
	Weeping Nude	1913–14	Munch Museum, Oslo, Norway	1088
	Youth	1913–14	Munch Museum, Oslo, Norway	1089
	Bathing Men	1913–15	Munch Museum, Oslo, Norway	1090
	Workers in Snow	1913–15	Munch Museum, Oslo, Norway	1091
	Snow Shovellers	1913–14	Probably lost, previously National Gallery, Berlin, Germany	1092
	The Logger	1913	Munch Museum, Oslo, Norway	1093
	Workers on their Way Home	1913–14	Munch Museum, Oslo, Norway	1094
	Workers on their Way Home	1914	Statens Museum for Kunst, Copenhagen, Denmark	1095
	Kiss on the Shore by Moonlight	1914	Munch Museum, Oslo, Norway	1096
	Puberty	1914–16	Munch Museum, Oslo, Norway	1097
	History: Study for the Boy	1914–16	Munch Museum, Oslo, Norway	1098
	History	1914	Stenersen Museum, Oslo, Norway. A gift from Rolf E. Stenersen to the city of Oslo	1099
	Alma Mater: Exploring Children	1914–15	Munch Museum, Oslo, Norway	1100
	Alma Mater: Middle Part	1914-15	Munch Museum, Oslo, Norway	1101
	Alma Mater: Seated Youth	1914–15	Munch Museum, Oslo, Norway	1102
	Alma Mater: Standing Child	1914–15	Munch Museum, Oslo, Norway	1103
	Alma Mater: Two Sitting Children	1914–15	Munch Museum, Oslo, Norway	1104
	Alma Mater: Fragment	1914–15	Munch Museum, Oslo, Norway	1105
	Alma Mater: Boy Lying Down	1914–15	Munch Museum, Oslo, Norway	1106
	Alma Mater: Middle Part	1914-15	Munch Museum, Oslo, Norway	1107
	Alma Mater: Two Seated Children	1914–15	Munch Museum, Oslo, Norway	1108
	Alma Mater	1914–15(?)	Munch Museum, Oslo, Norway	1109
	Alma Mater: Portrait Study	1914–16	Munch Museum, Oslo, Norway	1110
	Alma Mater: Portrait Study	1914–16	Munch Museum, Oslo, Norway	1111
	Geniuses in Sun Rays	1914–16	Munch Museum, Oslo, Norway	1112
	Geniuses in Sun Rays	1914–16	Munch Museum, Oslo, Norway	1113
	Men Turned towards the Sun	1914–16	Munch Museum, Oslo, Norway	1114
	Christen Sandberg	1914–15	Moss Klub- og Balselskab	1115
	Spring by the Coast	1914	Fram Trust, USA	1116
	Junipers by the Sea	1914–15	Munch Museum, Oslo, Norway	1117
	Birch Trunks	1914–15	Location unknown	1118
	Reclining Nude	1914–15	Munch Museum, Oslo, Norway	1119
	Reclining Nude on the Rocks	1914–15	Munch Museum, Oslo, Norway	1120
	Bathing Women and Children	1914–15	Munch Museum, Oslo, Norway	1121
	Bathing Woman by a Red Cliff	1914–15	Munch Museum, Oslo, Norway	1122
	Sunbathing	1914–15	Munch Museum, Oslo, Norway	1123
	Sunbathing	1914–15	Munch Museum, Oslo, Norway	1124
	Winter on the Coast	1915	traint	1125
	Winter on the Coast	1915	National Gallery, Oslo, Norway	1126
	Winter in Kragerø	1915	Harvard Art Museums: Busch-Reisinger Museum, Cambridge, Massachusetts, USA. Gift of Lynn G. Straus in memory of Philip A. Straus	1127
	Bay by the Fjord in Winter	1915–16	Wadsworth Atheneum, Hartford, Connecticut, USA. The Ella Gallup Summer and Mary Catlin Summer Collection Fund	1128
	Coastal Landscape at Hvitsten	1915	R. & H. Batliner Art Foundation, Vaduz, Liechtenstein	1129
	Death Struggle	1915	Statens Museum for Kunst, Copenhagen, Denmark	1130
	Death Struggle	1915	Munch Museum, Oslo, Norway	1131
	Sacrament	1915	Munch Museum, Oslo, Norway	1132
	Death Chamber	1915	Munch Museum, Oslo, Norway	1133
	Two Maids	1915	Munch Museum, Oslo, Norway	1134
	Two Women at the Table	1915-17	Munch Museum, Oslo, Norway	1135
	Blood Waterfall	1915–16	Munch Museum, Oslo, Norway	1136
	Experiment in Colour	1915–16	Munch Museum, Oslo, Norway	1137
	Forest Study	1915–16	Munch Museum, Oslo, Norway	1138
	Spring Day on Jeløya	1915	Location unknown	1139
	Spring Day on Jeløya	1915	Private collection	1140
	Auction at Grimsrød	1915	Private collection	1141
	Self-Portrait with Hat and Red Tie	ca. 1915	Munch Museum, Oslo, Norway	1142
	Self-Portrait in Hat and Coat	ca. 1915	Munch Museum, Oslo, Norway	1143
	Self-Portrait against Yellow Background	1915	Munch Museum, Oslo, Norway	1144
	Self-Portrait with Hat and Overcoat	1915	Munch Museum, Oslo, Norway	1145
	Male Nude	1915	Munch Museum, Oslo, Norway	1146
	Bathing Men on Rocks	1915	Munch Museum, Oslo, Norway	1147
	Bathing Men on Rocks	1915	Munch Museum, Oslo, Norway	1148
	Naked Man on Rock	1915	Munch Museum, Oslo, Norway	1149
	Sunbathing Women on Rocks	1915	Munch Museum, Oslo, Norway	1150
	Bathing Men	1915	Munch Museum, Oslo, Norway	1151
	Bathers on Rocks	1915	Munch Museum, Oslo, Norway	1152
	Bathing Women on Rocks	1915	Munch Museum, Oslo, Norway	1153
	Bathing Men on Rocks	1915	Munch Museum, Oslo, Norway	1154
	Red Rocks	1915	Munch Museum, Oslo, Norway	1155
	Red Rocks	1915	Munch Museum, Oslo, Norway	1156
	Midsummer	1915	Munch Museum, Oslo, Norway	1157
	Midsummer	1915	National Gallery, Oslo, Norway	1158
	Coastal Landscape at Hvitsten	1915	Fram Trust, USA	1159
	Sunbathing	1915	Munch Museum, Oslo, Norway	1160
	Bathers on Rocks	1915	Location unknown	1161
	Sunbathing	1915	Location unknown	1162
	Cabbage Field	1915	Munch Museum, Oslo, Norway	1163
	Workers in the Garden	1915	Munch Museum, Oslo, Norway	1164
	Man Digging	1915	Munch Museum, Oslo, Norway	1165
	The Death of the Bohemian	1915–17	Munch Museum, Oslo, Norway	1166
	The Death of the Bohemian	1915–20	Munch Museum, Oslo, Norway	1167
	The Death of the Bohemian	1915–20	Munch Museum, Oslo, Norway	1168
	The Death of the Bohemian	1915–17	Munch Museum, Oslo, Norway	1169
	Winter in Kragerø	1916	Munch Museum, Oslo, Norway	1170
	The Woman	1916–18	Munch Museum, Oslo, Norway	1171
	Vampire in the Forest	1916–18	Munch Museum, Oslo, Norway	1172
	Vampire	1916–18	Munch Museum, Oslo, Norway	1173
	Vampire	1916–18	Munch Museum, Oslo, Norway	1174
	Vampire	1916–18	Munch Museum, Oslo, Norway	1175
	Vampire	1916–18	nl:Sammlung Würth, Künzelsau, Germany	1176
	Bergen Harbour	1916	Munch Museum, Oslo, Norway	1177
	Bergen Harbour	1916	Munch Museum, Oslo, Norway	1178
	Bergen Harbour	1916	Epstein Family Collection, Washington DC, USA	1179
	Self-Portrait in Bergen	1916	Munch Museum, Oslo, Norway	1180
	Fields in March	1916	Private collection	1181
	Early Spring	1916–20	Munch Museum, Oslo, Norway	1182
	Spring Ploughing	1916	Fram Trust, USA	1183
	Spring Ploughing	1916	Munch Museum, Oslo, Norway	1184
	Ploughed Field	1916	Private collection	1185
	Coastal Landscape at Hvitsten	1916–17	Private collection	1186
	Coastal Landscape at Hvitsten	1916–17	Private collection	1187
	Waves Breaking on the Rocks	1916–19	Munch Museum, Oslo, Norway	1188
	The Fight	1916	Munch Museum, Oslo, Norway	1189
	Christian Gierløff in Åsgårdstrand	1916	Private collection	1190
	Kai Møller	1916–19	Felleskjøpet Østlandet, Norway	1191
	Kai Møller	1916	Munch Museum, Oslo, Norway	1192
	Leopold Wondt	1916	Munch Museum, Oslo, Norway	1193
	Leopold Wondt	1916	Axel C. Eitzen	1194
	Man in the Cabbage Field	1916	National Gallery, Oslo, Norway	1195
	Young Woman in the Garden	1916	Munch Museum, Oslo, Norway	1196
	Autumn Colours	1916–20	Munch Museum, Oslo, Norway	1197
	Two People on a Bench	1916	Munch Museum, Oslo, Norway	1198
	Greenhouse in Autumn	1916	Munch Museum, Oslo, Norway	1199
	Ploughing Horses	1916–17	Munch Museum, Oslo, Norway	1200
	Ploughed Field	1916–20	Munch Museum, Oslo, Norway	1201
	The Sower	1916–20	Munch Museum, Oslo, Norway	1202
	Seated Young Woman	1916	Munch Museum, Oslo, Norway	1203
	Seated Young Woman	1916	Private collection	1204
	Model with Hat and Coat	1916–17	Munch Museum, Oslo, Norway	1205
	Seated Nude on the Edge of the Bed	1916	Moderna Museet, Stockholm, Sweden	1206
	Seated Nude on the Edge of the Bed	1916	Private collection	1207
	Standing Nude	1916	Private collection	1208
	Nude Half Figure	1916-17	Location unknown	1209
	Reclining Nude	1916–17	Munch Museum, Oslo, Norway	1210
	At the Grand Piano	1916–17	Munch Museum, Oslo, Norway	1211
	Abdul Karim with a Green Scarf	1916	Munch Museum, Oslo, Norway	1212
	The Artist 'Sultan Abdul Karem'	1916	Munch Museum, Oslo, Norway	1213
	African in Green Coat	1916–17	Munch Museum, Oslo, Norway	1214
	Seated Naked Man with Dog	1916–17	Munch Museum, Oslo, Norway	1215
	Reclining Woman and Standing African	1916–17	Munch Museum, Oslo, Norway	1216
	Cleopatra and the Slave	1916–21	Munch Museum, Oslo, Norway	1217
	Cleopatra	1916	Munch Museum, Oslo, Norway	1218
	Standing Naked African	1916	Stenersen Museum, Oslo, Norway. A gift from Rolf E. Stenersen to the city of Oslo	1219
	Alma Mater	1916 (1915–16)	University of Oslo, The Aula	1220
	Geniuses in Lightstream	1914–16	University of Oslo, The Aula	1221
	Awakening Men in Lightstream	1914–16	University of Oslo, The Aula	1222
	Women Turned towards the Sun	1914–16	University of Oslo, The Aula	1223
	Men Turned towards the Sun	1914–16	University of Oslo, The Aula	1224
	New Rays	1914–16	University of Oslo, The Aula	1225
	The Source	1915–16	University of Oslo, The Aula	1226
	Chemistry	1914–16	University of Oslo, The Aula	1227
	Harvesting Women	1915–16	University of Oslo, The Aula	1228
	Fruit trees in Blossom in the Wind	1917–19	Munch Museum, Oslo, Norway	1229
	Fruit Trees in Blossom	1917–19	Munch Museum, Oslo, Norway	1230
	Woman in a Green Meadow	1917	Munch Museum, Oslo, Norway	1231
	In the Wind	1917	Location unknown	1232
	Woman in a White Dress	1917	Munch Museum, Oslo, Norway	1233
	Promenade in Spring	1917	Munch Museum, Oslo, Norway	1234
	Summer Night	1917	Location unknown	1235
	Two White Horses in a Green Meadow	1917–20	Munch Museum, Oslo, Norway	1236
	White Horse Seen from the Rear	1917–20	Munch Museum, Oslo, Norway	1237
	Horse and Man in the Field	1917–20	Munch Museum, Oslo, Norway	1238
	White Horse in a Green Meadow	1917–20	Munch Museum, Oslo, Norway	1239
	Behind the Plough	1917	Munch Museum, Oslo, Norway	1240
	Weeding	1917–19	Moderna Museet, Stockholm, Sweden	1241
	Field Work	1917	Private collection, USA	1242
	Cutting the Corn	1917	Munch Museum, Oslo, Norway	1243
	Corn Harvest	1917	Private collection	1244
	Corn Field	1917	University of Iowa Museum of Art, Iowa City, Iowa, USA. Gift from Owen and Leone Elliott	1245
	Reaping the Corn	1917–23	Fram Trust, USA	1246
	The Haymaker	1917	Munch Museum, Oslo, Norway	1247
	The Haymaker	1917	Munch Museum, Oslo, Norway	1248
	Nude in the Forest	1917	Private collection	1249
	Nude in the Forest	1917	Munch Museum, Oslo, Norway	1250
	Mermaid on the Beach	1917?	Munch Museum, Oslo, Norway	1251
	Bathing Women	1917?	Munch Museum, Oslo, Norway	1252
	Seated Nude in the Woods	1917?	Portland Art Museum, Oregon, USA. Purchased by the Activities Council for the Portland Art Museum.	1253
	Thorvald Løchen	1917	Munch Museum, Oslo, Norway	1254
	Thorvald Løchen	1917	Munch Museum, Oslo, Norway	1255
	Thorvald Løchen	1917	Munch Museum, Oslo, Norway	1256
	Hieronymus Heyerdahl	1917	Munch Museum, Oslo, Norway	1257
	Hieronymus Heyerdahl	1917–18	Oslo City Hall, Norway	1258
	Hieronymus Heyerdahl	1917	Axel C. Eitzen	1259
	Dagny Konow	1917	Munch Museum, Oslo, Norway	1260
	Dagny Konow	1917	Munch Museum, Oslo, Norway	1261
	Female Nudes, Standing and Lying down	191	Munch Museum, Oslo, Norway	1262
	Two Seated Nudes	1917	Munch Museum, Oslo, Norway	1263
	Women in the Bath	1917	Munch Museum, Oslo, Norway	1264
	Women in the Bath	1917	Munch Museum, Oslo, Norway	1265
	Conversation	1917	Private collection	1266
	Conversation	1917–18	Munch Museum, Oslo, Norway	1267
	Nude in Front of the Mirror	1917–20	Munch Museum, Oslo, Norway	1268
	Female Nudes, Seated and Standing	1917–18	Munch Museum, Oslo, Norway	1269
	Two Reclining Nudes	1917–19	Munch Museum, Oslo, Norway	1270
	Seated Female Nudes	1917	Private collection	1271
	Nude Female Back	1917–19	Munch Museum, Oslo, Norway	1272
	Crouching Nude	1917–19	Munch Museum, Oslo, Norway	1273
	Two Models	1917	Private collection	1274
	Double Portrait	1918	Fram Trust, USA	1275
	Double Portrait	1918	Location unknown	1276
	Double Portrait	1918	Private collection	1277
	Two Reclining Women	1918–19	Private collection	1278
	Two Seated Women	1918–19	Munch Museum, Oslo, Norway	1279
	Seated Man (Possibly a self-portrait)	1918	Location unknown	1280
	Coastal Landscape	1918	Kunstmuseum Basel, Switzerland	1281
	Landscape from Hvitsten	1918–19	Munch Museum, Oslo, Norway	1282
	Bathing Man	1918	Munch Museum, Oslo, Norway	1283
	Bathing Man	1918	National Gallery, Oslo, Norway	1284
	Bathing Men	1918	Munch Museum, Oslo, Norway	1285
	Man with Horse	1918	Private collection	1286
	Man with Horse	1918	Fram Trust, USA	1287
	Else Mustad	1918	Munch Museum, Oslo, Norway	1288
	Woman with Poppies	1918–19	Munch Museum, Oslo, Norway	1289
	Fjord Landscape	c.1918	Deji Art Museum, Nanjing, China	1290
	War	1918–19	Munch Museum, Oslo, Norway	1291
	War	1918–19	Munch Museum, Oslo, Norway	1292
	Peace and the Rainbow	1918–19	Munch Museum, Oslo, Norway	1293
	The Rainbow	1918–19	Munch Museum, Oslo, Norway	1294
	Self-Portrait with the Spanish Flu	1919	Behnhaus, Lübeck, Germany	1295
	Self-Portrait with the Spanish Flu	1919	National Gallery, Oslo, Norway	1296
	Self-Portrait after the Spanish Flu	1919	Munch Museum, Oslo, Norway	1297
	Flowers in a Vase	1919–20	Munch Museum, Oslo, Norway	1298
	Winter Night	1919	Harvard Art Museums, Busch-Reisinger Museum, Cambridge, Massachusetts, USA	1299
	Thawing Snow	1919	Fram Trust, USA	1300
	March	1919	Moderna Museet, Stockholm, Sweden	1301
	March	1919	Munch Museum, Oslo, Norway	1302
	The Magic Forest	1919	Munch Museum, Oslo, Norway	1303
	17th of May in a Small, Norwegian Town	1919	Munch Museum, Oslo, Norway	1304
	Waves	1919	Private collection	1305
	Anton Brünings	1919	Axel C. Eitzen	1306
	Anton Brünings	1919	Denofa and Lilleborg, Fredrikstad, Norway	1307
	Anton Brünings	1919	Munch Museum, Oslo, Norway	1308
	Anton Brünings	1919	Munch Museum, Oslo, Norway	1309
	Two Teenagers	1919	Munch Museum, Oslo, Norway	1310
	Female Nude in the Woods	1919	Munch Museum, Oslo, Norway	1311
	Male Nude in the Woods	1919	Munch Museum, Oslo, Norway	1312
	Male Nude Leaning forwards in the Woods	1919	Munch Museum, Oslo, Norway	1313
	Naked Man and Woman in the Woods	1919–25	Munch Museum, Oslo, Norway	1314
	Naked Men in the Woods	1919–25	Stenersen Museum, Oslo, Norway. A gift from Rolf E. Stenersen to the city of Oslo	1315
	Naked Men in the Woods	1919–25	Munch Museum, Oslo, Norway	1316
	Naked men in the Woods	1919–25	Munch Museum, Oslo, Norway	1317
	Woman Seated on a Couch	1919	Munch Museum, Oslo, Norway	1318
	Woman with her Hair Hanging Loose	1919	Munch Museum, Oslo, Norway	1319
	The Cat	1919	Hirshhorn Museum and Sculpture Garden, Smithsonian Institution, Washington DC, USA. Gift from the Joseph H. Hirshhorn Foundation, 1966	1320
	Weeping Nude	1919	Sarah Campbell Blaffer Foundation, Houston, Texas, USA	1321
	Kneeling Nude	1919–20	Sarah Campbell Blaffer Foundation, Houston, Texas, USA	1322
	Model by the Wicker Chair	1919–21	Munch Museum, Oslo, Norway	1323
	Model by the Wicker Chair	1919–21	Munch Museum, Oslo, Norway	1324
	Standing Nude	1919–20	Munch Museum, Oslo, Norway	1325
	Model by the Wicker Chair	1919–21	Munch Museum, Oslo, Norway	1326
	The Artist and his Model	1919-21	Munch Museum, Oslo, Norway	1327
	The Artist and his Model. Jealousy-Theme	1919–21	Munch Museum, Oslo, Norway	1328
	The Artist and his Model	1919-21	Munch Museum, Oslo, Norway	1329
	Model in Dressing Gown	1919–21	Munch Museum, Oslo, Norway	1330
	The Artist and his Model	1919-21	Munch Museum, Oslo, Norway	1331
	Cheek to Cheek	1919–20	Munch Museum, Oslo, Norway	1332
	Airdale Terrier	1919–20	Munch Museum, Oslo, Norway	1333
	Five Puppies on the Carpet	1919–21	Munch Museum, Oslo, Norway	1334
	Two Women in White Dresses in the Garden	1919	Munch Museum, Oslo, Norway	1335
	Two Women under the Tree in the Garden	1919	Munch Museum, Oslo, Norway	1336
	Two Women in the Garden	1919	Munch Museum, Oslo, Norway	1337
	Two Women in the Garden	1919	Munch Museum, Oslo, Norway	1338
	Under the Apple Tree	1919	Munch Museum, Oslo, Norway	1339
	Murder on the Road	1919	Munch Museum, Oslo, Norway	1340
	Autumn Ploughing	1919	National Gallery, Oslo, Norway	1341
	Man Ploughing with a White Horse	1919–20	Munch Museum, Oslo, Norway	1342
	Man Ploughing with a White Horse	1919–20	Munch Museum, Oslo, Norway	1343
	Horse Team Ploughing	1919–20	Munch Museum, Oslo, Norway	1344
	Ploughing Horses	1919–20	Munch Museum, Oslo, Norway	1345
	Man on the Harvester	1919–21	Munch Museum, Oslo, Norway	1346
	Two Black Horses at the Plough	1919–21	Munch Museum, Oslo, Norway	1347
	Elm Forest in Autumn	1919–20	Munch Museum, Oslo, Norway	1348
	Elm Forest in Autumn	1919–20	Munch Museum, Oslo, Norway	1349
	Rugged Trunks	1919–20	Munch Museum, Oslo, Norway	1350
	Elm Forest in Autumn	1919–20	Munch Museum, Oslo, Norway	1351
	Elm Forest in Autumn	1919–20	Munch Museum, Oslo, Norway	1352
	Fire at Grønland (A borough in Oslo)	1919–20	Munch Museum, Oslo, Norway	1353
	Hodman at Work on the Studio Building	1920	Munch Museum, Oslo, Norway	1354
	Hodman at Work on the Studio Building	1920	Munch Museum, Oslo, Norway	1355
	Bricklayers at Work on the Studio Building	1920	Munch Museum, Oslo, Norway	1356
	Hodman on the Ladder	1920	Munch Museum, Oslo, Norway	1357
	Building Workers in Snow	1920	Munch Museum, Oslo, Norway	1358
	Building Workers in Snow	1920	Munch Museum, Oslo, Norway	1359
	Street Workers in Snow	1920	Private collection	1360
	Workers Returning Home	1920	National Gallery, Oslo, Norway	1361
	Timbermen at Work on the Studio Building	1920	Munch Museum, Oslo, Norway	1362
	Building Workers in the Studio	1920	Munch Museum, Oslo, Norway	1363
	Carpenters in the Studio	1920	Munch Museum, Oslo, Norway	1364
	Building Workers in the Studio	1920	Munch Museum, Oslo, Norway	1365
	Workers and Horse	1920–30	Munch Museum, Oslo, Norway	1366
	Runaway Horse in Street	1920–25	Munch Museum, Oslo, Norway	1367
	Worker with Wheelbarrow	1920–30	Private collection	1368
	Fields in Springtime	1920–24	Munch Museum, Oslo, Norway	1369
	Landscape near Skøyen	1920–30	Location unknown	1370
	The Tram loop at Skøyen	1920–30	Munch Museum, Oslo, Norway	1371
	Digging Men with Horse and Cart	1920	Munch Museum, Oslo, Norway	1372
	Digging Men with Horse and Cart	1920	Munch Museum, Oslo, Norway	1373
	Elm Forest in Summer	1920–23	Munch Museum, Oslo, Norway	1374
	Two Women in the Woods at Ekely	1920–23	Munch Museum, Oslo, Norway	1375
	Mother and Daughter in the Garden	1920	Munch Museum, Oslo, Norway	1376
	Mother and Daughter in the Garden	1920	Munch Museum, Oslo, Norway	1377
	Landscape with Green Fields	1920–30	Munch Museum, Oslo, Norway	1378
	Sunbathing	1920–25	Munch Museum, Oslo, Norway	1379
	Washing Clothes by the Sea	1920–30	Location unknown	1380
	Moonlight on the Fjord	1920	Location unknown	1381
	Man with Bronchitis	1920	Munch Museum, Oslo, Norway	1382
	Sleeples Night. Self-Portrait in Inner Turmoil	1920	Munch Museum, Oslo, Norway	1383
	Three Women	1920–25	Munch Museum, Oslo, Norway	1384
	Model with Hat, Seated on the Couch	1920	Munch Museum, Oslo, Norway	1385
	Model Seated on the Couch	1920–21	Munch Museum, Oslo, Norway	1386
	Apple Tree by the Studio	1920–28	Munch Museum, Oslo, Norway	1387
	Garden with Apple Trees	1920	Munch Museum, Oslo, Norway	1388
	Apple Tree	1920–28	Munch Museum, Oslo, Norway	1389
	Drying Hay	1920	Munch Museum, Oslo, Norway	1390
	Forest with Two Figures	1920–30?	Munch Museum, Oslo, Norway	1391
	Tree Trunks	1920–30?	Munch Museum, Oslo, Norway	1392
	Tree Trunks	1920–30?	Munch Museum, Oslo, Norway	1393
	Alma Mater	1920–30	Munch Museum, Oslo, Norway	1394
	Alma Mater	1920–30	Munch Museum, Oslo, Norway	1395
	Winter Night	1921	Von der Heydt Museum, Wuppertal, Germany	1396
	Horse Team in Snow	1921–22	Munch Museum, Oslo, Norway	1397
	The Apple Tree	1921	Kunsthaus Zürich, Switzerland. Gift from Aldfred Rütschi	1398
	Inger Barth	1921	Stenersen Museum, Oslo, Norway. A gift from Rolf E. Stenersen to the city of Oslo	1399
	Inger Barth	1921	Private collection	1400
	Summer at Ekely	1921–30	Munch Museum, Oslo, Norway	1401
	Summer at Ekely	1921–30	Munch Museum, Oslo, Norway	1402
	Summer at Ekely	1921–30	Munch Museum, Oslo, Norway	1403
	The Dance of Life	1921	Stenersen Museum, Oslo, Norway. A gift from Rolf E. Stenersen to the city of Oslo	1404
	Kiss on the Beach	1921	Sarah Campbell Blaffer Foundation, Houston, Texas, USA	1405
	Meeting	1921	Private collection	1406
	Meeting	1921	Munch Museum, Oslo, Norway	1407
	Naked Couple on the Beach	1921–30	Munch Museum, Oslo, Norway	1408
	Naked Couple under the Trees	1921–23	Munch Museum, Oslo, Norway	1409
	Kiss on the Beach	1921–23	Munch Museum, Oslo, Norway	1410
	Dance on the Beach	1921–23	Munch Museum, Oslo, Norway	1411
	Meeting on the Beach	1921–25	Munch Museum, Oslo, Norway	1412
	Meeting on the Beach	1921–25	Munch Museum, Oslo, Norway	1413
	Dance on the Beach (The Freia Frieze VII)	1922	Freia Chocolate Factory, Oslo, Norway	1414
	Men and Women on the Beach (The Freia Frieze II)	1922	Freia Chocolate Factory, Oslo, Norway	1415
	Farewell (The Freia Frieze III)	1922	Freia Chocolate Factory, Oslo, Norway	1416
	Girls Watering Flowers (The Freia Frieze IV)	1922	Freia Chocolate Factory, Oslo, Norway	1417
	Harvesting the Tree (The Freia Frieze V)	1922	Freia Chocolate Factory, Oslo, Norway	1418
	Girls Harvesting Fruit (The Freia Frieze VI)	1922	Freia Chocolate Factory, Oslo, Norway	1419
	On the Way to the Boat (The Freia Frieze I)	1922	Freia Chocolate Factory, Oslo, Norway	1420
	Fertility (The Freia Frieze VIII)	1922	Freia Chocolate Factory, Oslo, Norway	1421
	Four Girls in Åsgårdstrand (The Freia Frieze IX)	1922	Freia Chocolate Factory, Oslo, Norway	1422
	The Fairytale Forest (The Freia Frieze X)	1922	Freia Chocolate Factory, Oslo, Norway	1423
	Out at Sea (The Freia Frieze XI)	1922	Freia Chocolate Factory, Oslo, Norway	1424
	Youth on the Beach (The Freia Frieze XII)	1922	Freia Chocolate Factory, Oslo, Norway	1425
	Four Girls in Åsgårdstrand	1922	Munch Museum, Oslo, Norway	1426
	Promenade on Karl Johan	1922–24	Munch Museum, Oslo, Norway	1427
	The Promenade	1922–24	Munch Museum, Oslo, Norway	1428
	Blue Coat in Sunshine	1922	Alexander M. Vik	1429
	Coastal Landscape at Hvitsten	1922	Private collection, USA	1430
	Wilhelm Wartmann	1922	Munch Museum, Oslo, Norway	1431
	Standing Nude	1922–23	Munch Museum, Oslo, Norway	1432
	Female Portrait against Yellow Background	1922	Private collection	1433
	Standing Woman	1922–23	Munch Museum, Oslo, Norway	1434
	Portrait of Model	1922-23	Munch Museum, Oslo, Norway	1435
	Standing Nude: Half-Figure	1922-23	Munch Museum, Oslo, Norway	1436
	Standing Nude	1922–23	Munch Museum, Oslo, Norway	1437
	Standing Nude	1922–23	Munch Museum, Oslo, Norway	1438
	Standing Nude with Arms behind her Head	1922–25	Munch Museum, Oslo, Norway	1439
	Standing Nude: Noon	1922–23	Munch Museum, Oslo, Norway	1440
	Standing Nude: Noon	1922–23	Munch Museum, Oslo, Norway	1441
	Standing Nude: Evening	1922–25	Munch Museum, Oslo, Norway	1442
	Seated Nude: Morning	1922–23	Munch Museum, Oslo, Norway	1443
	Seated Nude: Morning	1922–25	Munch Museum, Oslo, Norway	1444
	Reclining Nude: Night	1922–24	Munch Museum, Oslo, Norway	1445
	Reclining Nude: Night	1925	Munch Museum, Oslo, Norway	1446
	Kneeling Nude	1922	Private collection	1447
	Kneeling Nude	1922–26	Munch Museum, Oslo, Norway	1448
	Kneeling Nude	1922–26	Munch Museum, Oslo, Norway	1449
	Kneeling Nude	1922–26	Stenersen Museum, Oslo, Norway. A gift from Rolf E. Stenersen to the city of Oslo	1450
	Starry Night	1922–24	Munch Museum, Oslo, Norway	1451
	Starry Night	1922–24	Munch Museum, Oslo, Norway	1452
	Starry Night	1922–24	Munch Museum, Oslo, Norway	1453
	Winter Night	1922–26	Munch Museum, Oslo, Norway	1454
	Woman by the House Corner	1922–24	Munch Museum, Oslo, Norway	1455
	Woman by the Veranda Stairs	1922–24	The Saltzman Family Collection	1456
	On the Veranda Stairs	1922–24	Munch Museum, Oslo, Norway	1457
	On the Veranda Stairs	1922–24	Munch Museum, Oslo, Norway	1458
	Winter Night	1923	Private collection	1459
	House Wall in Moonlight	1922–24	Munch Museum, Oslo, Norway	1460
	Snow Landscape at Night	1923–26	Staatsgalerie Stuttgart, Germany	1461
	The Night Wanderer (A self-portrait)	1923–24	Munch Museum, Oslo, Norway	1462
	Self-Portrait in Hat and Coat	1923–24	Munch Museum, Oslo, Norway	1463
	Self-Portrait with Hands in Pockets	1923–26	Munch Museum, Oslo, Norway	1464
	Horse Team in Snow	1923	Munch Museum, Oslo, Norway	1465
	Horse Team and a St. Bernhard in the Snow	1923	Munch Museum, Oslo, Norway	1466
	Rugged Trunk in Snow	1923	Munch Museum, Oslo, Norway	1467
	Rugged Trunks in Snow	1923–25	Munch Museum, Oslo, Norway	1468
	Rugged Trunks in Snow	1923	Private collection	1469
	Rugged Trunks in Snow	1923	Munch Museum, Oslo, Norway	1470
	Rugged Trunks in Snow	Ca. 1923	Munch Museum, Oslo, Norway	1471
	Elm Forest in Spring	1923	Fram Trust, USA	1472
	Elm Forest in Spring	1923–25	Munch Museum, Oslo, Norway	1473
	Elm Forest in Spring	Ca. 1923	Munch Museum, Oslo, Norway	1474
	Elm Forest in Spring	1923–25	Munch Museum, Oslo, Norway	1475
	Elm Forest in Spring	Ca. 1923	Munch Museum, Oslo, Norway	1476
	Rugged Tree Trunks in Summer	1923	Munch Museum, Oslo, Norway	1477
	Rugged Tree Trunks in Summer	Ca. 1923	Munch Museum, Oslo, Norway	1478
	Spring Landscape	1923–24	Private collection	1479
	Road with Trees	1923	Private collection	1480
	Autumn by the Greenhouse	1923–25	Location unknown	1481
	Wilhelm Wartmann	1923	Kunsthaus Zürich, Switzerland	1482
	Wilhelm Wartmann	1923	de:Kunstmuseum St. Gallen, Switzerland. Acquired by Marie Müller-Guarneri Foundation	1483
	Naked Men in Swimming Pool	1923	Munch Museum, Oslo, Norway	1484
	Naked Men in the Baths	1923	Munch Museum, Oslo, Norway	1485
	Naked Men in the Baths	1923	Munch Museum, Oslo, Norway	1486
	Naked Man Gripping his Ankle	1923	Munch Museum, Oslo, Norway	1487
	Naked Men in Landscape	1923–30	Munch Museum, Oslo, Norway	1488
	Naked Men in Landscape	1923–25	Munch Museum, Oslo, Norway	1489
	Naked Men in Landscape	1923–25	Munch Museum, Oslo, Norway	1490
	Portrait of Female Model	1923-33	Munch Museum, Oslo, Norway	1491
	Portrait of Female Model	1923-26	Munch Museum, Oslo, Norway	1492
	Young Woman in a Blue Dress, Seated	1924	Munch Museum, Oslo, Norway	1493
	Two Women, Seated	1924–26	Munch Museum, Oslo, Norway	1494
	Model in Wicker Chair	1924–25	Private collection	1495
	Model in Wicker Chair	1924–25	Munch Museum, Oslo, Norway	1496
	Woman in a Blue Dress Pouring Coffee	1924–26	Munch Museum, Oslo, Norway	1497
	Woman in a Blue Dress	1924–26	Munch Museum, Oslo, Norway	1498
	Woman in a Blue Dress with her Arms over her Head	1924–26	Location unknown	1499
	Seated Model on the Couch	1924	Munch Museum, Oslo, Norway	1500
	Seated Model on the Couch	1924–26	Munch Museum, Oslo, Norway	1501
	Woman in a Négligée	1924–25	Munch Museum, Oslo, Norway	1502
	The Gothic Girl	1924	Private collection, Switzerland	1503
	Birgit Prestøe in the Garden	1924–30	Munch Museum, Oslo, Norway	1504
	Two Women on the Veranda	1924	Hirshhorn Museum and Sculpture Garden, Smithsonian Institution, Washington DC, USA. Gift from the Joseph H. Hirshhorn Foundation, 1966	1505
	Young Woman on the Veranda	1924	Private collection	1506
	Woman in Grey	1924–25	Munch Museum, Oslo, Norway	1507
	Vampire in the Forest	1924–25	Munch Museum, Oslo, Norway	1508
	Consolation in the Forest	1924–25	Munch Museum, Oslo, Norway	1509
	Consolation in the Forest	1924–25	Munch Museum, Oslo, Norway	1510
	After the Fall	1924–25	Munch Museum, Oslo, Norway	1511
	Seated Male Nude in the Forest	1924–25	Munch Museum, Oslo, Norway	1512
	At Work by the Greenhouse	1924	no:Stavanger kunstmuseum, Stavanger, Norway	1513
	Woman	1924–25	Munch Museum, Oslo, Norway	1514
	Naked Figures and Sun	1924–25	Munch Museum, Oslo, Norway	1515
	Naked Man and Woman, Seated	1924–25	Munch Museum, Oslo, Norway	1516
	Naked Man and Woman, Walking	1924–30	Munch Museum, Oslo, Norway	1517
	The Rainbow	1924	Munch Museum, Oslo, Norway	1518
	Birgit Prestøe, Portrait Study	1924–25	Munch Museum, Oslo, Norway	1519
	Nude, Sitting on the Couch	1925–26	Munch Museum, Oslo, Norway	1520
	Nude, Sitting on the Couch	1925–26	Munch Museum, Oslo, Norway	1521
	Nude with Bowed Head	1925–30	Location unknown	1522
	The Wedding of the Bohemian	1925	Munch Museum, Oslo, Norway	1523
	The Wedding of the Bohemian	1925–30	Munch Museum, Oslo, Norway	1524
	The Wedding of the Bohemian	1925–30	Munch Museum, Oslo, Norway	1525
	The Wedding of the Bohemian	1925–30	Munch Museum, Oslo, Norway	1526
	The Death of the Bohemian	1925–26	Munch Museum, Oslo, Norway	1527
	Oslo Bohemians	1925–26	Munch Museum, Oslo, Norway	1528
	Oslo Bohemians	1925–26	Munch Museum, Oslo, Norway	1529
	The Wedding of the Bohemian	1925–30	Private collection	1530
	Self-Portrait at the Wedding Table	1925-26	Munch Museum, Oslo, Norway	1531
	Self-Portrait at the Wedding Table	1925-26	Munch Museum, Oslo, Norway	1532
	Birgit Prestøe, Portrait Study	1925–26	Munch Museum, Oslo, Norway	1533
	Self-Portrait with Hand in Pocket	1925–26	Munch Museum, Oslo, Norway	1534
	Self-Portrait with Dogs	1925–26	Pola Museum of Art, Hakone, Japan	1535
	Landscape with Red House	1925–26	Private collection, Switzerland	1536
	The House is Burning!	1925–27	Munch Museum, Oslo, Norway	1537
	Winter Night	1925–30	Munch Museum, Oslo, Norway	1538
	Mountains	1925	Munch Museum, Oslo, Norway	1539
	Mountains	1925	Munch Museum, Oslo, Norway	1540
	House with Mountains in the Background	1925	Munch Museum, Oslo, Norway	1541
	Naked Women by the Sea	1925–30	Munch Museum, Oslo, Norway	1542
	Two Women in White on the Beach	1925–30	Munch Museum, Oslo, Norway	1543
	Standing Nude against Blue Background	1925–30	Munch Museum, Oslo, Norway	1544
	Meeting in Space	1925–29	Munch Museum, Oslo, Norway	1545
	Draft for a Decoration	1925–29	Munch Museum, Oslo, Norway	1546
	Draft for a Decoration	1925–29	Munch Museum, Oslo, Norway	1547
	Draft for a Decoration	1925–29	Munch Museum, Oslo, Norway	1548
	Woman with Airdale Terrier	1925	Munch Museum, Oslo, Norway	1549
	Woman in a Blue Coat	1925	Munch Museum, Oslo, Norway	1550
	Heinrich C. Hudtwalcker	1925	Private collection, Switzerland	1551
	Heinrich C. Hudtwalcker	1925	Munch Museum, Oslo, Norway	1552
	Heinrich C. Hudtwalcker	1925	Munch Museum, Oslo, Norway	1553
	Lucien Dedichen and Jappe Nilssen	1925–26	Munch Museum, Oslo, Norway	1554
	Lucien Dedichen and Jappe Nilssen	1925–26	Munch Museum, Oslo, Norway	1555
	Lucien Dedichen	1925–26	Private collection, São Paulo	1556
	Jappe Nilssen in a Wicker Chair	1925–26	Erik M. Vik	1557
	Rolf Stenersen	1925–26	Munch Museum, Oslo, Norway	1558
	Rolf Stenersen	1925	Location unknown	1559
	Winter in Kragerø	1925–31	Kunsthaus Zürich, Switzerland	1560
	The Sick Child	1925	Munch Museum, Oslo, Norway	1561
	Ashes	1925	Munch Museum, Oslo, Norway	1562
	The Dance of Life	1925	Munch Museum, Oslo, Norway	1563
	Woman	192	Munch Museum, Oslo, Norway	1564
	Summer Evening	1925–27	Munch Museum, Oslo, Norway	1565
	Life	1925–30	Munch Museum, Oslo, Norway	1566
	History	1926	Munch Museum, Oslo, Norway	1567
	Street With Chestnut in Blossom	1925–30	Munch Museum, Oslo, Norway	1568
	Street with Chestnut in Blossom	1925–30	Private collection	1569
	The Red House	1926	Private collection	1570
	The Red House	1926	Private collection	1571
	The Red House	1926–30	Axel C. Eitzen	1572
	Spring Landscape with Red House	1926	Munch Museum, Oslo, Norway	1573
	Spring Landscape with Red House	1926	Munch Museum, Oslo, Norway	1574
	The Red House	1926	Munch Museum, Oslo, Norway	1575
	The Red House	1926–27	Location unknown	1576
	Bathing Men	1926–30	Munch Museum, Oslo, Norway	1577
	Bathing Men	1926–30	Munch Museum, Oslo, Norway	1578
	Self-Portrait with Palette	1926	Private collection	1579
	Self-Portrait in Front of the House Wall	1926	Munch Museum, Oslo, Norway	1580
	Model With Hands Resting on Knees	1926–29	Munch Museum, Oslo, Norway	1581
	Model with Hands Resting on Knees	1926–29	Munch Museum, Oslo, Norway	1582
	Woman with Peonies	1926	Fram Trust, USA	1583
	Woman with Peonies	1926	Munch Museum, Oslo, Norway	1584
	Woman in the Garden	1926	Munch Museum, Oslo, Norway	1585
	Three Women in the Garden	1926	Munch Museum, Oslo, Norway	1586
	Four Women in the Garden	1926	Munch Museum, Oslo, Norway	1587
	Two Horses in the Forest	1926	Munch Museum, Oslo, Norway	1588
	Two Women in the Garden	1926	Munch Museum, Oslo, Norway	1589
	Two Women in the Garden	1926	Munch Museum, Oslo, Norway	1590
	The Arbour in Late Autumn	1926–30	Munch Museum, Oslo, Norway	1591
	Still Life with Pumpkin and other Vegetables	1926–30	Munch Museum, Oslo, Norway	1592
	Still Life with Tomatoes, Leek and Casseroles	1926–30	Munch Museum, Oslo, Norway	1593
	Still Life with Tomatoes, Leek and Casseroles	1926–30	Munch Museum, Oslo, Norway	1594
	Still Life with Cabbage and other Vegetables	1926–30	Munch Museum, Oslo, Norway	1595
	The Storm: Left Part	1926-27	Probably lost	1596
	The Storm: Left Middle Part	1926-27	Munch Museum, Oslo, Norway	1597
	The Storm: Right Middle Part	1926-27	Munch Museum, Oslo, Norway	1598
	The Storm: Right Part	1926-27	Munch Museum, Oslo, Norway	1599
	Naked Man in Rocky Landscape	1926–27	Munch Museum, Oslo, Norway	1600
	The Rainbow: Fragment	1926–27	Munch Museum, Oslo, Norway	1601
	The Human Mountain: Middle Part	1926-28	Munch Museum, Oslo, Norway	1602
	The Human Mountain: Left Upper Part	1926-28	Munch Museum, Oslo, Norway	1603
	The Human Mountain: Left Under Part	1926-28	Munch Museum, Oslo, Norway	1604
	The Human Mountain: Right Part	1926-29	Munch Museum, Oslo, Norway	1605
	The Human Mountain: Utter Right Part	1926-28	Munch Museum, Oslo, Norway	1606
	The Human Mountain: Sphinx	1927–28	Munch Museum, Oslo, Norway	1607
	The Human Mountain: Kneeling Nude	1927–28	Munch Museum, Oslo, Norway	1608
	The Human Mountain: Two Graces	1927	Munch Museum, Oslo, Norway	1609
	Two Graces	1927	Munch Museum, Oslo, Norway	1610
	Two Graces	1927	Munch Museum, Oslo, Norway	1611
	The Human Mountain: Sunrays	1927–29	Munch Museum, Oslo, Norway	1612
	The Human Mountain: Towards the Light	1927–29	Munch Museum, Oslo, Norway	1613
	Two Graces	1927–29	Munch Museum, Oslo, Norway	1614
	Krotkaja	1927–29	Munch Museum, Oslo, Norway	1615
	Naked Figures	1927–29	Munch Museum, Oslo, Norway	1616
	Kneeling Female Figure	1927-29	Munch Museum, Oslo, Norway	1617
	Red House and Spruces	1927	Munch Museum, Oslo, Norway	1618
	Red House and Spruces	1927	Munch Museum, Oslo, Norway	1619
	Dog's Face	1927	Stenersen Museum, Oslo, Norway. A gift from Rolf E. Stenersen to the city of Oslo	1620
	Three Men	1927–30	Munch Museum, Oslo, Norway	1621
	Around the Drinking Table	1927-30	Munch Museum, Oslo, Norway	1622
	P.A. Munch's Grave in Rome	1927	Munch Museum, Oslo, Norway	1623
	P.A. Munch's Grave in Rome	1927	Munch Museum, Oslo, Norway	1624
	Forest Study	1927?	Munch Museum, Oslo, Norway	1625
	Evening Mood	Ca. 1927	Munch Museum, Oslo, Norway	1626
	Frimann Koren	1927	Munch Museum, Oslo, Norway	1627
	Frimann Koren	1927	Munch Museum, Oslo, Norway	1628
	Maria Agatha Meier	1927	Munch Museum, Oslo, Norway	1629
	Maria Agatha Meier	1927	Private collection	1630
	The Sick Child	1927	Munch Museum, Oslo, Norway	1631
	The Girls on the Bridge	1927	Munch Museum, Oslo, Norway	1632
	Forest	1927	Neue Nationalgalerie, Berlin, Germany	1633
	The Fairytale Forest	1927–29	Private collection	1634
	Beneath the Red Apples	1927–30	Munch Museum, Oslo, Norway	1635
	Apple Tree in the Garden at Ekely	1928–29	Private collection	1636
	Fredrik Stang	1927–28	Munch Museum, Oslo, Norway	1637
	Otto Blehr	1927–30	Storting, Oslo, Norway	1638
	Otto Blehr	1927–30	Munch Museum, Oslo, Norway	1639
	Winter Forest	1927–30	Munch Museum, Oslo, Norway	1640
	Galloping White Horse	1928	Munch Museum, Oslo, Norway	1641
	Large Deciduous Tree	1928–30	Munch Museum, Oslo, Norway	1642
	Adam and Eve	1928	Munch Museum, Oslo, Norway	1643
	Adam and Eve	1928	Munch Museum, Oslo, Norway	1644
	Woman in a Red Dress	1927–30	Private collection	1645
	Woman in the Garden	1928	Location unknown	1646
	Horse Team on a Building Site	1928–29	Munch Museum, Oslo, Norway	1647
	Winter Studio under Construction	1929	Munch Museum, Oslo, Norway	1648
	Building Worker	1929	Munch Museum, Oslo, Norway	1649
	The Building of the Winter Studio	1929	Munch Museum, Oslo, Norway	1650
	Workers on the Building Site	1929–31	Munch Museum, Oslo, Norway	1651
	Workers on the Building Site	1929–31	Munch Museum, Oslo, Norway	1652
	Workers on the Building Site	1929–31	Munch Museum, Oslo, Norway	1653
	Bricklayer	1929	Munch Museum, Oslo, Norway	1654
	Kragerø in Spring	1929	Private collection, USA	1655
	From Kragerø	1910-11	Harvard Art Museums, Busch-Reisinger Museum, Cambridge, Massachusetts, USA	1656
	Horses Ploughing	1929?	Munch Museum, Oslo, Norway	1657
	Bathing Men	1929	Munch Museum, Oslo, Norway	1658
	People Wandering in the Garden	1929–30	Munch Museum, Oslo, Norway	1659
	Alma Mater	1929	Munch Museum, Oslo, Norway	1660
	Jealousy in the Garden	1929–30	Munch Museum, Oslo, Norway	1661
	Jealousy in the Garden	1929–30	Munch Museum, Oslo, Norway	1662
	Woman with Samoyed	1929–30	Munch Museum, Oslo, Norway	1663
	Woman with Samoyed	1929–30	Munch Museum, Oslo, Norway	1664
	Woman with Samoyed	1929–30	Munch Museum, Oslo, Norway	1665
	Model in the Garden	1930	Munch Museum, Oslo, Norway	1666
	Walking in the Garden	1930	Location unknown	1667
	Charlotte Corday	1930	Munch Museum, Oslo, Norway	1668
	Marat in the Bath and Charlotte Corday	1930	Munch Museum, Oslo, Norway	1669
	Marat in the Bath and Charlotte Corday	1930	Munch Museum, Oslo, Norway	1670
	Charlotte Corday	1930	Munch Museum, Oslo, Norway	1671
	Winter Night	1930–31	The Art Museums in Bergen, Norway. Bergen Art Museum (Stenersen's Collection)	1672
	Old Firsherman on Snow-covered Coast	1930	Private collection	1673
	Self-Portrait with Wounded Eye	Ca. 1930	Munch Museum, Oslo, Norway	1674
	Disturbed Vision	1930	Munch Museum, Oslo, Norway	1675
	Disturbed Vision	1930	Munch Museum, Oslo, Norway	1676
	Self-Portrait on the Glass Veranda	1930–33	Munch Museum, Oslo, Norway	1677
	Self-Portrait on the Glass Veranda	1930–33	Munch Museum, Oslo, Norway	1678
	Woman with Small Boy	1930	Munch Museum, Oslo, Norway	1679
	Forest with Birch Trunks	1930–35	Munch Museum, Oslo, Norway	1680
	Bathing Woman and Children	1930–35	Munch Museum, Oslo, Norway	1681
	Alma Mater: Figure Study	1930–40	Munch Museum, Oslo, Norway	1682
	Street Workers in Snow	1931–33	Munch Museum, Oslo, Norway	1683
	Snow Shovellers on the Building Site	1931–33	Munch Museum, Oslo, Norway	1684
	Workers on the Building Site. Draft for a Decoration of Oslo City Hall	1931–33	Munch Museum, Oslo, Norway	1685
	Workers in Snow: Five Fragments	1931–33	Munch Museum, Oslo, Norway	1686
	Workers in Snow: Fragment	1931–33	Munch Museum, Oslo, Norway	1687
	Street Workers in Snow: Fragment	1931–33	Munch Museum, Oslo, Norway	1688
	Summer on Karl Johan	1931	The Art Museums in Bergen, Norway. Bergen Art Museum (Stenersen's Collection)	1689
	The Wave	1931	Munch Museum, Oslo, Norway	1690
	Fritz H. Frølich	1931	Munch Museum, Oslo, Norway	1691
	Fritz H. Frølich	1931	Private collection	1692
	Apple Tree in the garden	1932–42	Munch Museum, Oslo, Norway	1693
	Man with Horse	1932–40	Munch Museum, Oslo, Norway	1694
	Henriette Olsen	1932	Private collection	1695
	Henriette Olsen	1932	Munch Museum, Oslo, Norway	1696
	Henriette Olsen	1932	Private collection	1697
	Maggie Torkildsen	1932	Private collection	1698
	Maggie Torkildsen	1932	Munch Museum, Oslo, Norway	1699
	The Girl from Nordland	1932	Munch Museum, Oslo, Norway	1700
	The Girl from Nordland: Five Fragments	1932	Munch Museum, Oslo, Norway	1701
	The Girl from Nordland	1932	Munch Museum, Oslo, Norway	1702
	de:Eberhard Grisebach	1932	Munch Museum, Oslo, Norway	1703
	de:Eberhard Grisebach	1932	Munch Museum, Oslo, Norway	1704
	de:Eberhard Grisebach	1932	Munch Museum, Oslo, Norway	1705
	de:Eberhard Grisebach	1932	Munch Museum, Oslo, Norway	1706
	Hanna Brieschke in Åsgårdstrand	1932	Munch Museum, Oslo, Norway	1707
	Hanna Brieschke in Åsgårdstrand	1932	Munch Museum, Oslo, Norway	1708
	The Splitting of Faust	1932–35	Munch Museum, Oslo, Norway	1709
	The Fight	1932–35	Munch Museum, Oslo, Norway	1710
	The Fight	1932	Munch Museum, Oslo, Norway	1711
	Uninvited Guests	1932–35	Munch Museum, Oslo, Norway	1712
	Rowboats at Åsgårdstrand	1932–33	Location unknown	1713
	Boys Bathing	1932–33	Location unknown	1714
	The Girls on the Bridge	1933–35	Kimbell Art Museum, Fort Worth, Texas, USA	1715
	Meeting on the Beach	1933–35	Munch Museum, Oslo, Norway	1716
	Two Women on the Shore	1933–35	Munch Museum, Oslo, Norway	1717
	Two Women on the Shore	1933–35	Munch Museum, Oslo, Norway	1718
	Two Human Beings. The Lonely Ones	1933–35	Munch Museum, Oslo, Norway	1719
	Jealousy	1933–35	Munch Museum, Oslo, Norway	1720
	The Women on the Bridge	1934–40	Munch Museum, Oslo, Norway	1721
	The Red House	1934–35	Munch Museum, Oslo, Norway	1722
	The Red House	1934–35	Munch Museum, Oslo, Norway	1723
	Karl Wefring	1934–35	Munch Museum, Oslo, Norway	1724
	Karl Wefring	1934–35	Munch Museum, Oslo, Norway	1725
	Annie Stenersen	1934	Axel C. Eitzen	1726
	Annie Stenersen	1934	Munch Museum, Oslo, Norway	1727
	Female Head	1934?	Munch Museum, Oslo, Norway	1728
	Johan Martin and Sten Stenersen	1935	Location unknown	1729
	Johan Martin and Sten Stenersen	1935	Munch Museum, Oslo, Norway	1730
	Johan Martin and Sten Stenersen	1935	Munch Museum, Oslo, Norway	1731
	Ebba Ridderstad	1935	Munch Museum, Oslo, Norway	1732
	Ebba Ridderstad	1935	Munch Museum, Oslo, Norway	1733
	Ebba Ridderstad	1935	Private collection	1734
	Ebba Ridderstad and Marika Pauli	1935	Munch Museum, Oslo, Norway	1735
	Andreas Reading	1935–36?	Munch Museum, Oslo, Norway	1736
	Spring at Ekely	1935–43	Munch Museum, Oslo, Norway	1737
	Under the Chestnut Tree	1937	Munch Museum, Oslo, Norway	1738
	Under the Chestnut Tree	1937	Munch Museum, Oslo, Norway	1739
	Encounter beneath the Chestnut Tree	1937	Munch Museum, Oslo, Norway	1740
	Encounter beneath the Chestnut Tree	1937	Munch Museum, Oslo, Norway	1741
	Nicolai Rygg	1937–38	Private collection	1742
	Nicolai Rygg	1938	Norges Bank	1743
	Nicolai Rygg	1938	University of Central Oklahoma, Edmond, Oklahoma, USA	1744
	Henrik Bull	1939	Private collection	1745
	Henrik Bull	1939	Munch Museum, Oslo, Norway	1746
	Hand Reaching out for Bottles	1938 (?)	Munch Museum, Oslo, Norway	1747
	Self-Portrait with Bottles	1938 (?)	Munch Museum, Oslo, Norway	1748
	Self-Portrait by the Window	Ca. 1940	Munch Museum, Oslo, Norway	1749
	Self-Portrait, with a Cod's Head on the Plate	1940–42	Munch Museum, Oslo, Norway	1750
	Autumn Landscape	1940–43	Munch Museum, Oslo, Norway	1751
	Self-Portrait	1940–43	Munch Museum, Oslo, Norway	1752
	Anemones	19	Munch Museum, Oslo, Norway	1753
	People Sunbathing in a Bay	1940–42	Munch Museum, Oslo, Norway	1754
	Naked Men in Birch Forest	1940–42	Munch Museum, Oslo, Norway	1755
	Beach	1940–43	Munch Museum, Oslo, Norway	1756
	People Sunbathing	1940–42	Munch Museum, Oslo, Norway	1757
	Beach	1940–43	Munch Museum, Oslo, Norway	1758
	Beach Scene	1940–43	Munch Museum, Oslo, Norway	1759
	Beach Scene	1940–43	Munch Museum, Oslo, Norway	1760
	Beach Scene	1940–43	Private collection	1761
	Bathers on the Beach	1940–42	Munch Museum, Oslo, Norway	1762
	Alma Mater	1940	Munch Museum, Oslo, Norway	1763
	Self-Portrait. Between the Clock and the Bed.	1940–43	Munch Museum, Oslo, Norway	1764
	Visiting at Ekely	1942	Munch Museum, Oslo, Norway	1765
	Visiting at Ekely	1942	Munch Museum, Oslo, Norway	1766
	Study of a Head	1942–43	Munch Museum, Oslo, Norway	1767
	Young Woman	1942	Munch Museum, Oslo, Norway	1768
	Female Nude	1942	Munch Museum, Oslo, Norway	1769
	Woman with Pumpkin	1942	Munch Museum, Oslo, Norway	1770
	Woman with Pumpkin	1942	Munch Museum, Oslo, Norway	1771
	Flirting in the Park	1942	Munch Museum, Oslo, Norway	1772
	Flirting in the Park	1942	Munch Museum, Oslo, Norway	1773
	Midsummer Night's Eve	1942	Munch Museum, Oslo, Norway	1774
	Two Women by the veranda Steps	1942	Munch Museum, Oslo, Norway	1775
	Woman by the veranda Steps	1942	Munch Museum, Oslo, Norway	1776
	Painter by the Wall	1942	Munch Museum, Oslo, Norway	1777
	Haymaking	1942	Munch Museum, Oslo, Norway	1778
	Haymaking	1942	Munch Museum, Oslo, Norway	1779
	Dog's Head	1942	Munch Museum, Oslo, Norway	1780
	Self-Portrait by the Arbour	1942	Munch Museum, Oslo, Norway	1781
	Rolf Hansen	1943	Munch Museum, Oslo, Norway	1782
	Rolf Hansen	1943	Munch Museum, Oslo, Norway	1783
	Rolf Hansen	1943	Munch Museum, Oslo, Norway	1784
	Rolf Hansen	1943	Munch Museum, Oslo, Norway	1785
	Portrait of a Man	1943	Munch Museum, Oslo, Norway	1786
	Erik Pedersen	1943	Solomon R. Guggenheim Museum, New York City, USA	1787
	The Man in the Cabbage Field	1943	Munch Museum, Oslo, Norway	1788
	Self-Portrait with Pastel Stick	1943	Munch Museum, Oslo, Norway	1789

== See also ==
- Munch Museum
