= Christmas in the Brothel =

Painting by Edvard Munch

- Julaften i bordell (Norwegian)
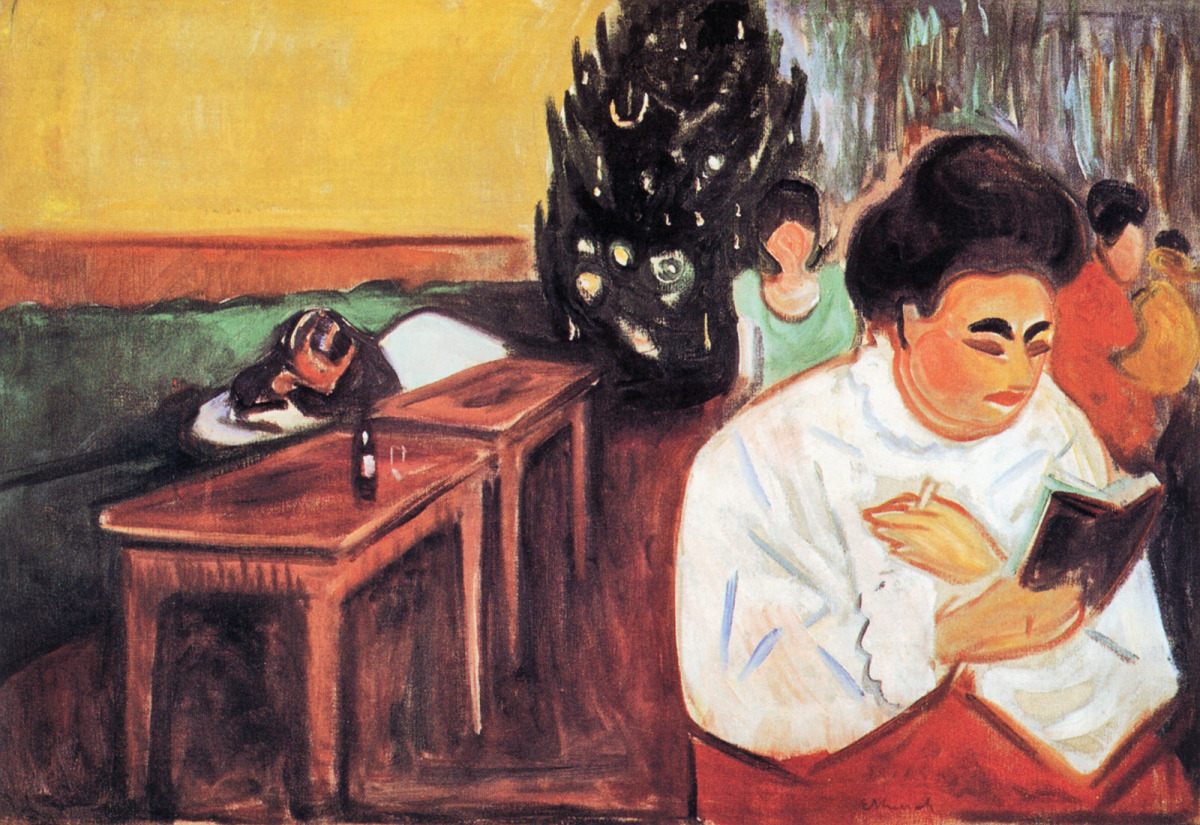
- Artist: Edvard Munch
- Year: 1903–1904
- Medium: Oil on canvas
- Dimensions: 60 cm × 88 cm (24 in × 35 in)
- Location: Munch Museum, Oslo

Christmas in the Brothel (Norwegian: Julaften i bordell) is an oil-on-canvas painting by Norwegian painter Edvard Munch. The Expressionist painting was completed in 1903–04 and is housed at the Munch Museum in Oslo.

== Background ==
The painting was done at a difficult time for Munch: a commission for a portrait in Hamburg (of a Senator Holthusen, the father in law of Munch's patron Max Linde) had come to naught because of disagreements. As a result, Munch suffered anxieties, which he attempted to manage with alcohol. A visit to a brothel in Lübeck is supposedly the background to Christmas in the Brothel, a "light yet melancholy" painting in which the working girls in a brothel have just finished decorating a Christmas tree. "Ironic, sentimentally unholy", the painting is interpreted as a commentary on both Linde's upper-class household (where Munch was staying at the time) and Munch's own "pietistic home background". Like other paintings of the period, it shows Munch's association with Fauvism. Prostitution was a favored topic of Munch's, and one particular room in a German brothel would later inspire an entire series of paintings, The Green Room.

== See also ==
- List of paintings by Edvard Munch
