= 1897 in art =

The year 1897 in art involved some significant events.

== Events ==
- February 18 – Conclusion of the Benin Expedition of 1897, leading to the Benin Bronzes being carried off to London.
- April 3 – Vienna Secession founded by artists including Gustav Klimt, Koloman Moser, Josef Hoffmann, Joseph Maria Olbrich, Max Kurzweil. Secession hall designed by Olbrich.
- May 1 – Ny Carlsberg Glyptotek art museum opened in Copenhagen.
- May 27 – A Separate Exhibition of Painting and Sculpture (Wystawa osobna obrazów i rzeźb) is staged at Sukiennice Museum in Main Square, Kraków.
- August 4 – The "Lady of Elche" Iberian sculpture (4th century BCE) is found at L'Alcúdia near Elche in Spain.
- September – Edvard Munch stages a major retrospective in Christiania.
- October 27 – First meeting of the Society of Polish Artists "Sztuka" in Kraków.
- At Giverny, Claude Monet begins painting his Water Lilies series, which will continue until the end of his life.
- Elbridge Ayer Burbank begins painting portraits of Native Americans in the United States from life.
- Women photographers Zaida Ben-Yusuf and Gertrude Käsebier open portrait studios in New York City.

== Publications ==
- A Book of Fifty Drawings by Aubrey Beardsley is published.
- Vingt Dessins 1861–1896, a collection of prints by Edgar Degas.
- Bernard Berenson publishes Central Italian Painters of the Renaissance.

== Works ==
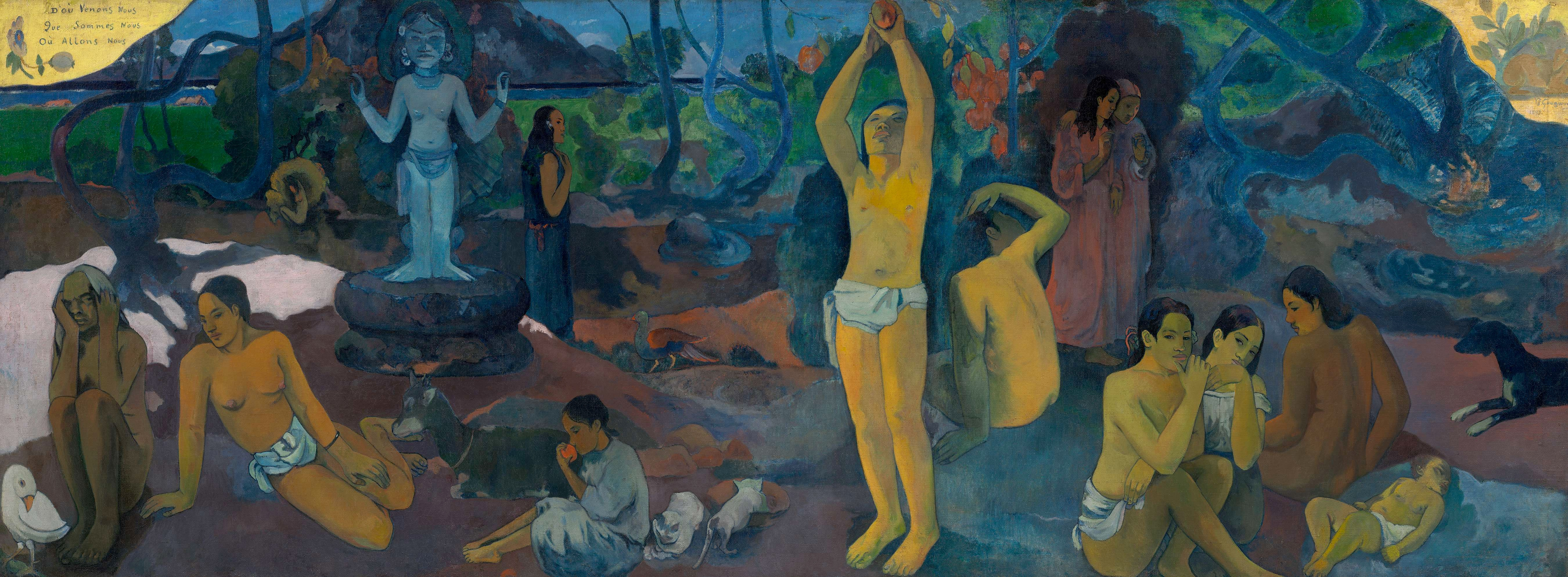
Paul Gauguin, Where Do We Come From? What Are We? Where Are We Going? (oil on canvas), Museum of Fine Arts, Boston, United States

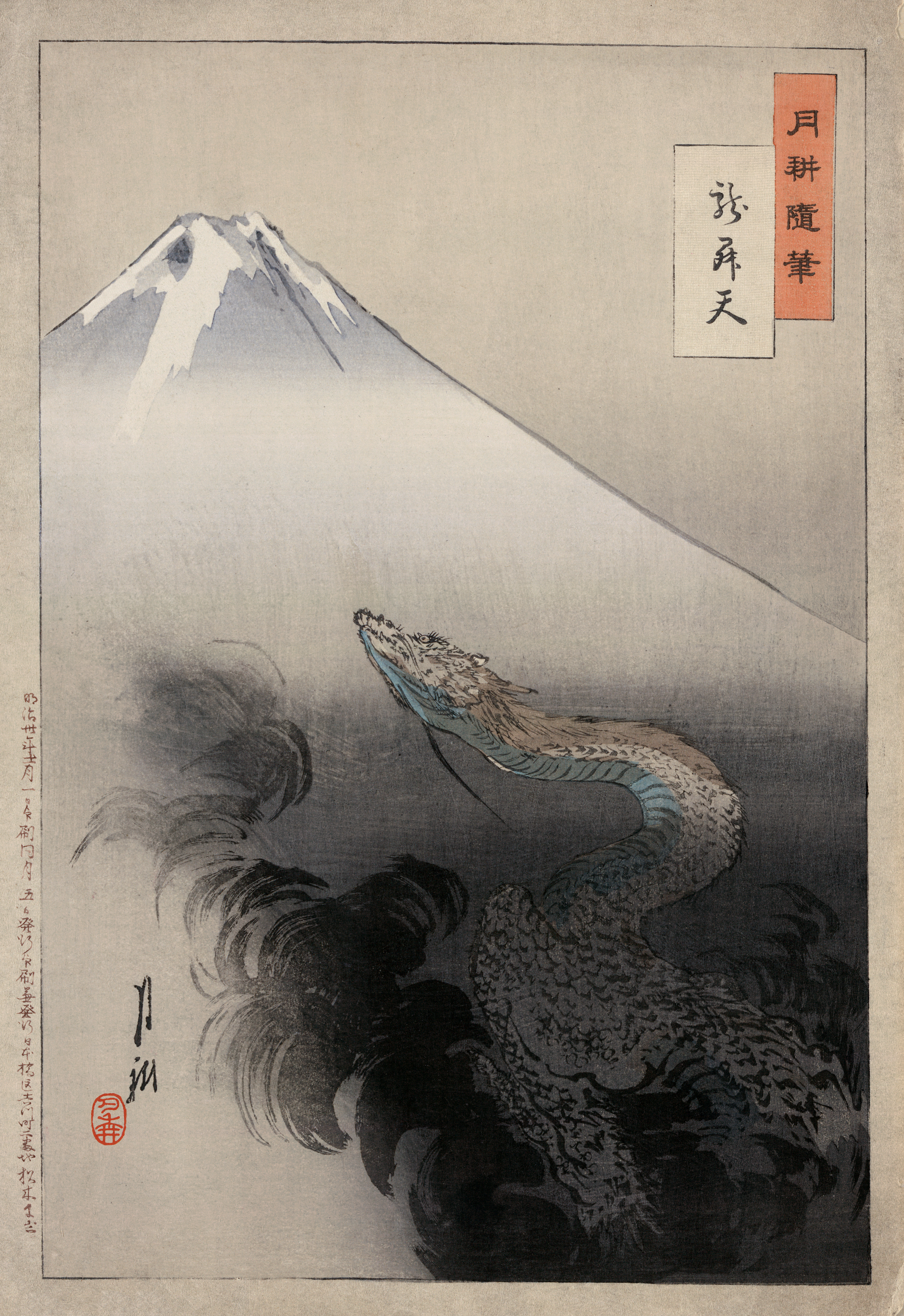
Ogata Gekkō, Ryu sho ten, from his Views of Mount Fuji

- Edwin Austin Abbey – The Play Scene in Hamlet
- Philip Burne-Jones – The Vampire
- Georges Clairin – Sarah Bernhardt as the Queen in 'Ruy Blas'
- Herbert James Draper – Pot Pourri
- Roberto Ferruzzi – Madonnina
- Akseli Gallen-Kallela – Lemminkäinen's Mother
- Paul Gauguin
  - ‘’Nevermore
  - Where Do We Come From? What Are We? Where Are We Going?
- Ogata Gekkō – Ryu sho ten (published 1898)
- J. W. Godward – Dolce far Niente (first version)
- Jean-Jacques Henner – Portrait of Mlle Fouquier
- Jacek Malczewski – Vicious Circle
- Claude Monet
  - Branch of the Seine near Giverny (Mist)
  - Morning on the Seine near Giverny
  - The Seine at Giverny
- Edvard Munch – The Kiss
- Camille Pissarro
  - Boulevard Montmartre
  - Boulevard Montmartre in Spring
  - Boulevard Montmartre on a Winter Morning
- Armand Point
  - The Siren
  - Golden Legend (color lithograph)
- Maurice Prendergast – Summer Visitors
- Henri Rousseau – The Sleeping Gypsy
- John Singer Sargent – Mr. and Mrs. I. N. Phelps Stokes
- Rudolf Siemering – Washington Monument, Philadelphia
- Henryk Siemiradzki – A Christian Dirce
- Douglas Tilden – Admission Day Monument, San Francisco
- Vasily Vereshchagin – Napoleon near Borodino
- Arthur Wardle – The Totteridge XI
- Painters under the direction of Jan Styka – Transylvania Panorama (Lwów)

== Births ==
- January 9 – Tyra Lundgren, Swedish painter, ceramist, glass and textile designer and writer on art (died 1979)
- January 17 – Charles Ragland Bunnell, American painter (died 1968)
- January 21 – René Iché, French sculptor (died 1954)
- March 16 – Antonio Donghi, Italian painter (died 1963)
- May 2 – Adolf Hyła, Polish painter and art teacher (died 1965)
- May 21 – Nikola Avramov, Bulgarian painter (died 1945)
- June 3 – Georg Mayer-Marton, Hungarian-born graphic artist (died 1960)
- June 22 – Albert Renger-Patzsch, German photographer (died 1966)
- June 26 – Victor Servranckx, Belgian painter (died 1965)
- August 19 – Roman Vishniac, Russian American photographer (died 1990)
- September 23 – Paul Delvaux, Belgian painter (died 1994)
- October 27 – Lena Gurr, American painter and lithographer (died 1992)
- November 5 – Hilda Vīka, Latvian painter (died 1963)

== Deaths ==
- February 7 – Charles Edward Boutibonne, French Classicist painter (born 1816)
- February 9 – George Price Boyce, English Pre-Raphaelite watercolour landscape painter (born 1826)
- March 21 – Ādams Alksnis, Latvian painter (born 1864)
- May 20 – Jacques Émile Édouard Brandon, French artist (born 1831)
- June 7 – Victor Mottez, French fresco and portrait painter (born 1809)
- September 8 – James Milo Griffith, Welsh sculptor (born 1843)
- September 20 – Louis Pierre Mouillard, French artist and aviation pioneer (born 1834)
- October 5 – Sir John Gilbert, English painter (born 1817)
- October 8 – Alexei Savrasov, Russian landscape painter (born 1830)
- November 18 – Henry Doulton, English potter (born 1820)
- November 29 – Félix Pissarro, French-born painter, TB (born 1874)
- December 30 – Edward La Trobe Bateman, English-born Pre-Raphaelite watercolour painter, book illuminator, draughtsman and garden designer (born 1816)
- date unknown – Jang Seung-eop ('Owon'), Korean painter (born 1843)
