= Totteridge (disambiguation) =

Totteridge may refer to:

- Totteridge in the London Borough of Barnet, Greater London, England
  - The Totteridge Academy, a school in Barnet
  - Totteridge Millhillians, a cricket club from Totteridge in the Hertfordshire Cricket League
- Totteridge, Buckinghamshire, an area of High Wycombe, England
- Arnold Totteridge, recurring character on BBC radio comedy I'm Sorry, I'll Read That Again

== See also ==
- The Totteridge XI, a painting of 11 show dogs
