= Shōda Kōhō =

Shōda Kōhō (庄田 耕峰, also 耕峯, Shōda Kōhō; September 25, 1877 – July 1, 1924) was a Japanese Nihonga painter, woodblock print artist, and Kyōka poet of the Meiji and Taishō eras. He was a pupil of Ogata Gekkō and became known both for his paintings and shin-hanga woodblock prints, as well as later for his satirical poetry. His real name was Shōda Kan (庄田 完).

== Life ==
Shōda was born in 1877 in Kanda, Tokyo, as the second son of Shōda Yasukō, a former shogunate retainer. He also used the art name Chōshunkyō (長春居).

After finishing middle school, he entered the studio of Ogata Gekkō, where he studied figure painting and bijin-ga (images of beautiful women). He later worked as an illustrator for the newspaper Chūō Shimbun.

At the first Bunten exhibition in 1907 he was awarded a bronze medal for one of his works. During the late Meiji and early Taishō periods, he produced numerous color woodblock prints in the Shin-hanga style, including works such as Ōmisoka (大晦日, Shitamachi Scene), Tsukiyo no Kohan (月夜の湖畔, Lakeside on a Moonlit Night), and Yoru no Ōhashi (夜の大橋, The Great Bridge at Night), all published by Hasegawa Publishing (also known as Hasegawa-Nishinomiya), a firm founded in 1885 by Hasegawa Takejirō.

Around the age of thirty, he withdrew from the art world and lived in Shitaya-ku, Kaminegishi, Go-inden, Tokyo (now Taitō-ku). Under the pen names Unnoya Hachisuke (雲廼家蜂助) and Renji Kōshi (連辞公子) he was mainly active as a poet of humorous Kyōka and Kyōshi verse. He died in Tokyo in 1924 at the age of 48.

Shōda Kōhō received little attention in the art world or in 20th-century Japan; his life remains a mystery to this day. It was not until almost a century later, when the famous art collector Robert O. Muller discovered and published his works in 2003, that his name became widely known. His moonlit night prints were even celebrated as the ‘archetype of the Japanese landscape’ and sparked a veritable trend. In English-language literature, there are sometimes discrepancies in biographical details.

== Works ==
Shōda Kōhō is best known internationally for his woodblock prints, especially the series Night Scenes (夜の風景, Yoru no fūkei), a collaborative set of 21 chūban-format prints published by Hasegawa-Nishinomiya beginning in the 1910s. The designs depict evening landscapes in subdued sepia or blue tones and continued to be printed into the 1930s, with reprints appearing also in the postwar era.

In addition to the Night Scenes, Shōda also contributed to the production of so-called tanzaku prints (短冊版画), also known as hashira-e (pillar prints). These narrow, vertical formats reflected the architectural spaces of traditional Japanese houses, where posts often provided the only surfaces for hanging pictures. Together with Yoshimoto Gessō, Shōda created numerous designs for Hasegawa-Nishinomiya, issued in sets of twelve prints. Approximately 96 different images have been recorded, covering a wide variety of themes and demonstrating the inventiveness required by the restricted format.

== Bibliography ==
- 20-Seiki Nihon Jinmei Jiten (20世紀日本人名事典), Nichigai Associates, Tokyo 2004, entry “Shōda Kōhō (庄田耕峰)”, online at Kotobank.
- Ryōichi Higuchi: Shōda Kōhō (庄田耕峯), in: Hangadō (ed.), Kindai Nihon Hangaka Meiran (1900–1945) (近代日本版画家名覧 [1900–1945], A Directory of Modern Japanese Printmakers [1900–1945]), online at Hangadō, retrieved September 1, 2025.
- Helen Merritt; Nanako Yamada: Guide to Modern Japanese Woodblock Prints: 1900–1975. University of Hawaii Press, Honolulu 1992, p. 73.
- Momonage, Shinji: Gekkō no deshi-tachi I (月耕の弟子たち I, Gekkō’s Disciples I), in: Ogata Gekkō to sono ichimon (尾形月耕とその一門, Ogata Gekkō and his school), Bien (美庵), no. 45 (Autumn 2007), Geijutsu Shuppansha, Tokyo, p. 28–33, ISBN 978-4-434-10956-0.
