= Smooth Fox Terrier =

Terrier dog breed

Fox Terrier (Smooth)
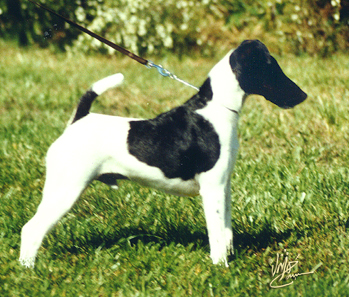
- AKC champion Fox Terrier
- Other names: Fox Terrier; Smooth Fox Terrier
- Common nicknames: Foxie; SFT
- Origin: England
Kennel club standards
- The Kennel Club: standard
- Fédération Cynologique Internationale: standard

The Smooth Fox Terrier is a breed of dog, one of many terrier breeds. It was the first breed in the Fox Terrier family to be given official recognition by The Kennel Club (circa 1875; breed standard 1876). It is well known, and although not a widely popular breed today outside hunting and show circles, it is extremely significant due to the large number of terriers believed descended from the breed.

== History ==
=== Origins ===
The Smooth Fox Terrier's development as a breed is largely undocumented, but the dog has been known as a distinct breed in England since at least the 18th century; the first documented evidence of the Smooth Fox Terrier came in 1790, when a Colonel Thornton painted a portrait of his dog, Pitch.

=== Recognition ===
The Smooth Fox Terrier entered the show ring during the mid-19th century, making it one of the earliest entrants in such events. The American Kennel Club recognized the Fox Terrier in 1885; one hundred years later, the Smooth Fox Terrier was recognized as being a distinct breed from the Wire Fox Terrier.

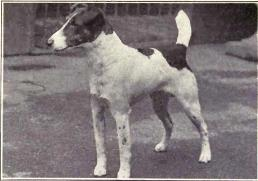
Smooth Fox Terrier circa 1915

Conventional wisdom long held that the Smooth Fox Terrier and Wire Fox Terrier are variations of the same breed; in recent years, however, an increasing number of experts have stated the opinion that the two breeds are not related at all. Whereas the Wire Fox Terrier is probably directly descended from the Rough Black and Tan Terrier of Wales, the Smooth Fox Terrier is thought to count the Smooth Black and Tan Terrier as its primary ancestor, with traces of Beagle and Bull Terrier thrown in as well.

However, the two breeds were considered to be varieties of one breed and were occasionally interbred until the mid-1980s when the AKC changed them from varieties to separate breeds. All modern Smooth Fox Terriers trace back to wires many times, from Eng. Ch Watteau Chorister, through Eng. Ch. Lethal Weapon, Eng. Ch. Corrector of Notts and Eng. Ch. Cromwell Ochre's Legacy back to Dusky D'Orsay. Bred by Mr. Francis Redmond, Dusky D'Orsay's sire was a Wire, Dusky Collar, and her dam a Smooth, Eng. Ch. D'Orsay's Donna. Through Dusky D'Orsay, all modern Smooths trace back to several famous Wires, including Ch. Cackler Of Notts and Meersbrook Bristles.

The Smooth Fox Terrier's historic profession is fox bolting. A fox bolting dog will accompany a pack of foxhounds and "bolt" after foxes, driving them out from their hiding spots and into the line of sight of the larger dogs and men on horses. Smooth Fox Terriers with white coats were less likely to be mistaken for the fox in close combat situations, and were therefore more highly prized.

=== Temperament ===
The Smooth Fox Terrier is a highly energetic dog, and thus not recommended for first time dog owners. As the breed was originally bred to go after small animals, they also have a high prey instinct, they are very friendly dogs and do not mind strangers if introduced and exposed to people from a young age. Without appropriate early exposure, however, loud barking may ensue.

== Health ==
Some known health problems are deafness, luxating patellas and a variety of eye disorders such as lens luxation, distichiasis, and cataracts. Skeletal problems that can occur include Legge-Perthes disease and shoulder dislocations. Myasthenia gravis and idiopathic epilepsy have also been reported, as well as goiter.

Ataxia is a hereditary condition in the breed. A mutation in the KCNJ10 gene, which has been identified in the Jack Russell Terrier and Parson Russell Terrier as the cause of one type of ataxia, has also been identified in this breed.

== Notable Smooth-haired Fox Terriers ==
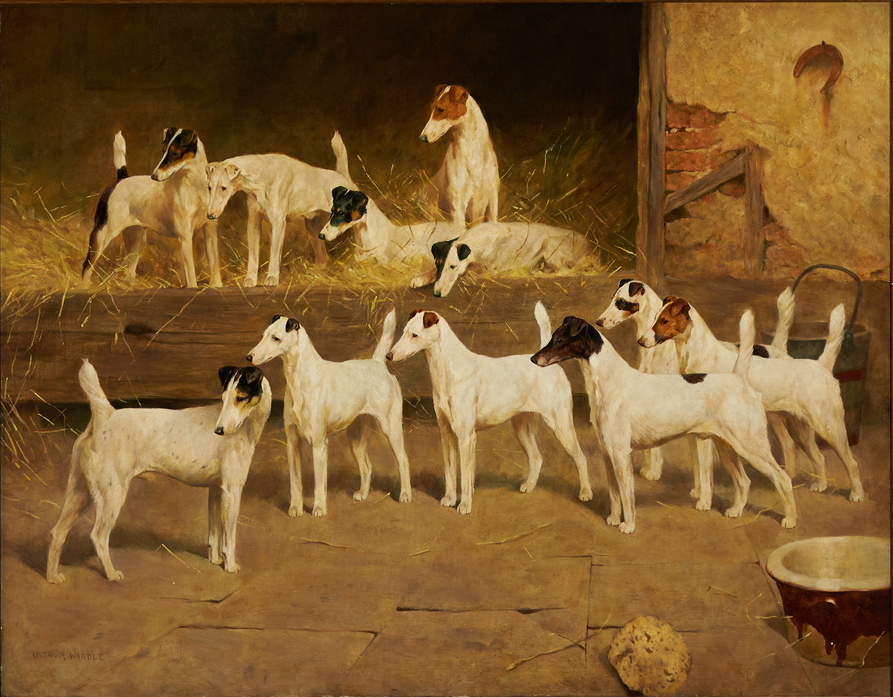
The Totteridge XI, by Arthur Wardle, 1897, portrays 11 Smooth Fox Terrier show dogs

- Nipper, mascot of the His Master's Voice entertainment trademark symbol; some commercials featured him portrayed as a Smooth Fox Terrier, though others dispute this and determine the dog was a Jack Russell Terrier mixed breed.
- Snitter, protagonist from the novel The Plague Dogs, written by Richard Adams
- Titina, travelled with Umberto Nobile on Airship Norge and Airship Italia
- Skip, from the book My Dog Skip by Willie Morris (played by a Jack Russell Terrier in the film of the same name)
- Dash, seven consequent dogs (among them, six Smooth Fox Terriers) of Sir Aurel Stein, who accompanied him in archeological expeditions to Xinjiang, Iran and other countries in the early 20th century
- Igloo, pet of explorer Richard E. Byrd; frequently accompanied Byrd on trips to Antarctica
- Angus and India are the Smooth Fox Terriers of fashion designer and film director Tom Ford; they appear in his film A Single Man and have been on the runway of his fashion show. John was another Smooth Fox Terrier owned by Ford; John and Ford appeared on the front page of i-D magazine in 2001.
- Kvik in the Danish TV series Matador

== See also ==
- List of dog breeds
- Fox Terrier, for additional details on history, genetics, and coat color
