= Ōdera Yasuzumi =

Japanese general (1846–1895)

- 大寺 安純
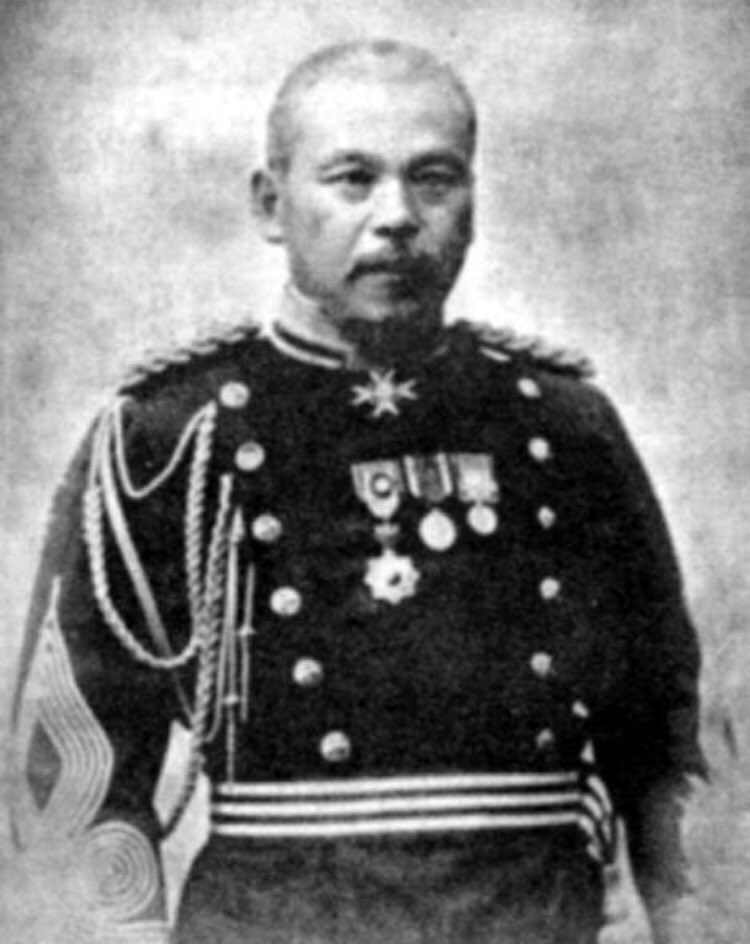
- Born: March 9, 1846; Satsuma Domain, Japan
- Died: February 9, 1895 (aged 48); Weihai, Shandong Province, China
- Military career
- Allegiance: Empire of Japan
- Branch: Imperial Japanese Army
- Service years: 1871–1895
- Rank: Major General
- Conflicts: Boshin War; Satsuma Rebellion; Taiwan Expedition of 1874; First Sino-Japanese War; Battle of Weihaiwei †
- Awards: Order of the Rising Sun

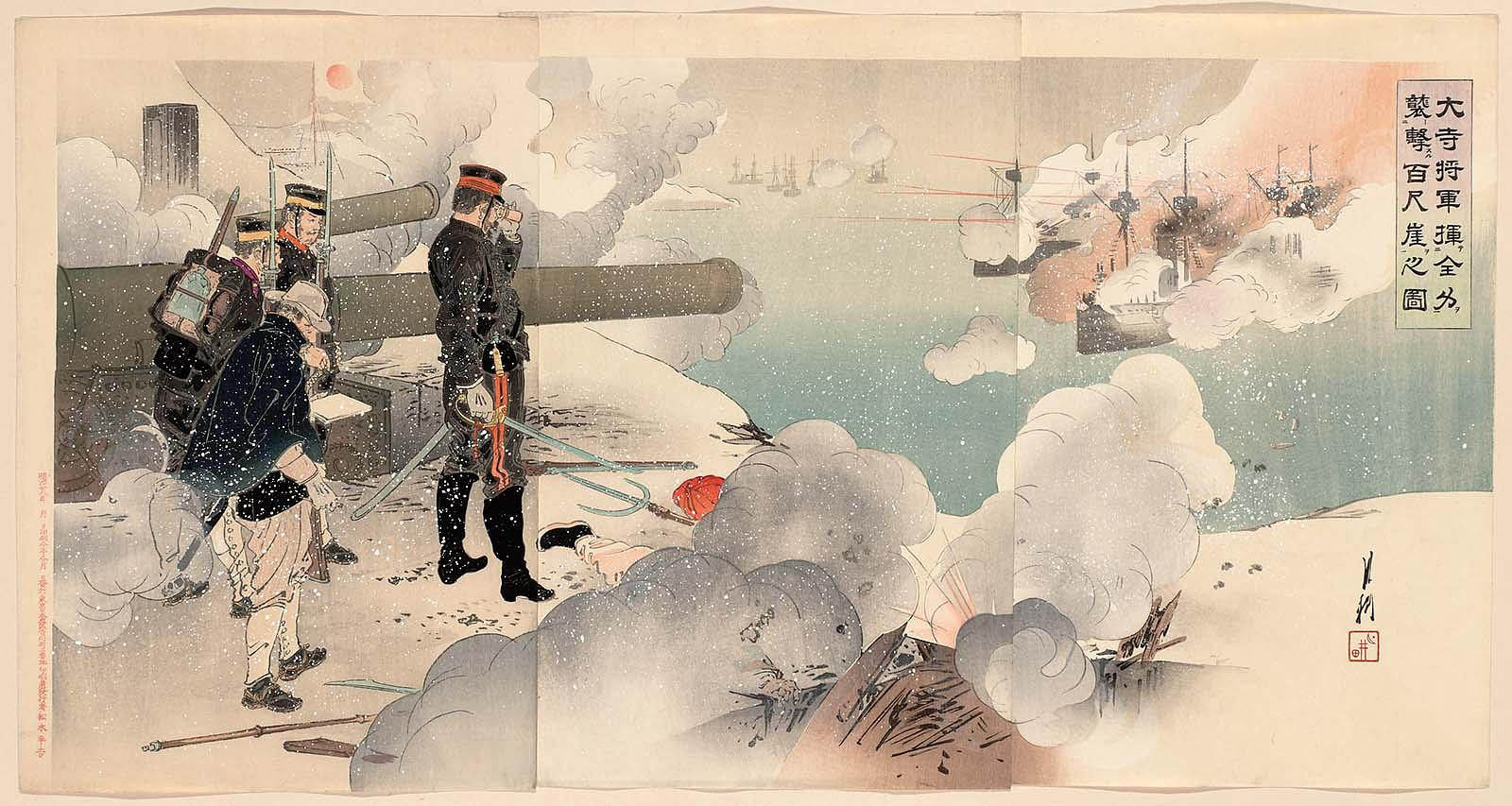
Ōdera Yasuzumi at the battle of Weihaiwei. Ukiyo-e print by Ogata Gekkō.

Major General Ôdera Crossing the Sanzu River

Ōdera Yasuzumi (大寺 安純; 9 March 1846 – 9 February 1895) was a general in the early Imperial Japanese Army, and the highest ranking casualty on the Japanese side in the First Sino-Japanese War.

== Life and career ==
Ōdera was born in Satsuma Domain (present day Kagoshima Prefecture), as the second son of a samurai in the service of the Shimazu clan. He studied at the domain's military academy, and fought in the Boshin War of the Meiji restoration. During the Battle of Toba-Fushimi, he fought alongside fellow Satsuma clansmen Yamamoto Gonnohyōe and Shibayama Yahachi. In an anecdotal account of the battle, Ōdera was sleeping when Tokugawa forces opened fire. When awakened by his comrades, he complained that he could not see the enemy since it was too dark, and he would wait until daylight to fire back as he did not want to waste ammunition.

In 1872, he entered the fledgling Imperial Japanese Army as a second lieutenant. He was soon promoted to lieutenant, and in February 1874, Ōdera participated in the suppression of the Saga Rebellion, followed by the Taiwan Expedition of 1874. He later served in the Hiroshima Military District, the IJA 12th Infantry Regiment, During the Satsuma Rebellion, he was a company commander. During the campaign, he lost his right ear to enemy gunfire, but was instrumental in taking Kumamoto Castle back from the rebels. Ōdera subsequently served with the IJA 11th Infantry Regiment, as a brigade commander in IJA 8th Infantry Regiment, and as a brigade commander in the Imperial Guards. He was promoted to captain in 1888, after which he served as chief of staff of the IJA 2nd Division, IJA 4th Division and IJA 1st Divisions. In February 1894 and he was sent to the United States and Europe as a military attaché, visiting France and Germany. He was planning to continue on to visit Russia when recalled to Japan over rising tensions with China.

In November 1894, Ōdera was promoted to major general and made commander of the IJA 11th Infantry Regiment. Under his command were cavalry detachments led by Nogi Maresuke and Akiyama Yoshifuru. Ōdera has praised by French military observers by his cool demeanor when under fire, calmly smoking a cigarette while enemy bullets fell all around him. He reportedly responded by saying that he was not strong - only the smell of smoke from his cigarette was strong. While leading his troops during the Battle of Weihaiwei in the First Sino-Japanese War against the land fortifications guarding the naval base, his position was hit by shrapnel from an artillery shell fired by the Beiyang fleet cruiser Jiyuan. Ōdera was the only Japanese general killed in combat during the war.

Ōdera was posthumously promoted to 3rd Court rank, and his son was ennobled with the title of baron (danshaku) under the kazoku peerage system. Ōdera's grave is at Aoyama Cemetery in Tokyo, and some of his personal effects are on display at the Yūshūkan Museum associated with Yasukuni Shrine in Tokyo.

== Decorations ==
- 1878 – Order of the Rising Sun, 5th class
- 1884 – Order of the Rising Sun, 4th class
- 1892 – Order of the Sacred Treasure, 3rd class
