= Charles-Édouard Boutibonne =

French painter (1816–1897)

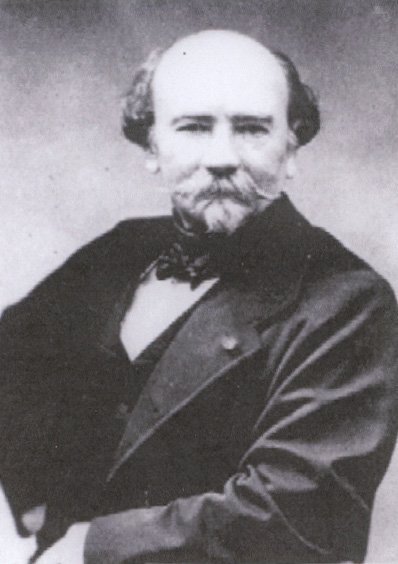
Charles Édouard Boutibonne

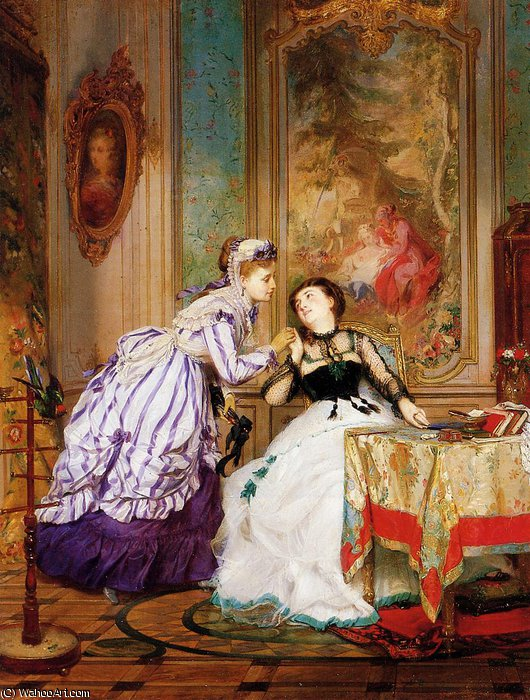
Édouard Boutibonne, A Warm Reception, oil on panel, 55x43 cm, 1868

Charles Édouard Boutibonne (Budapest, 8 July 1816 – Wilderswil, 7 February 1897) was a French painter of the academic classicism school.

He was born to French parents in Hungary. As a 22-year-old he painted a portrait of Liszt. He was a student of Franz Winterhalter.

== Gallery ==
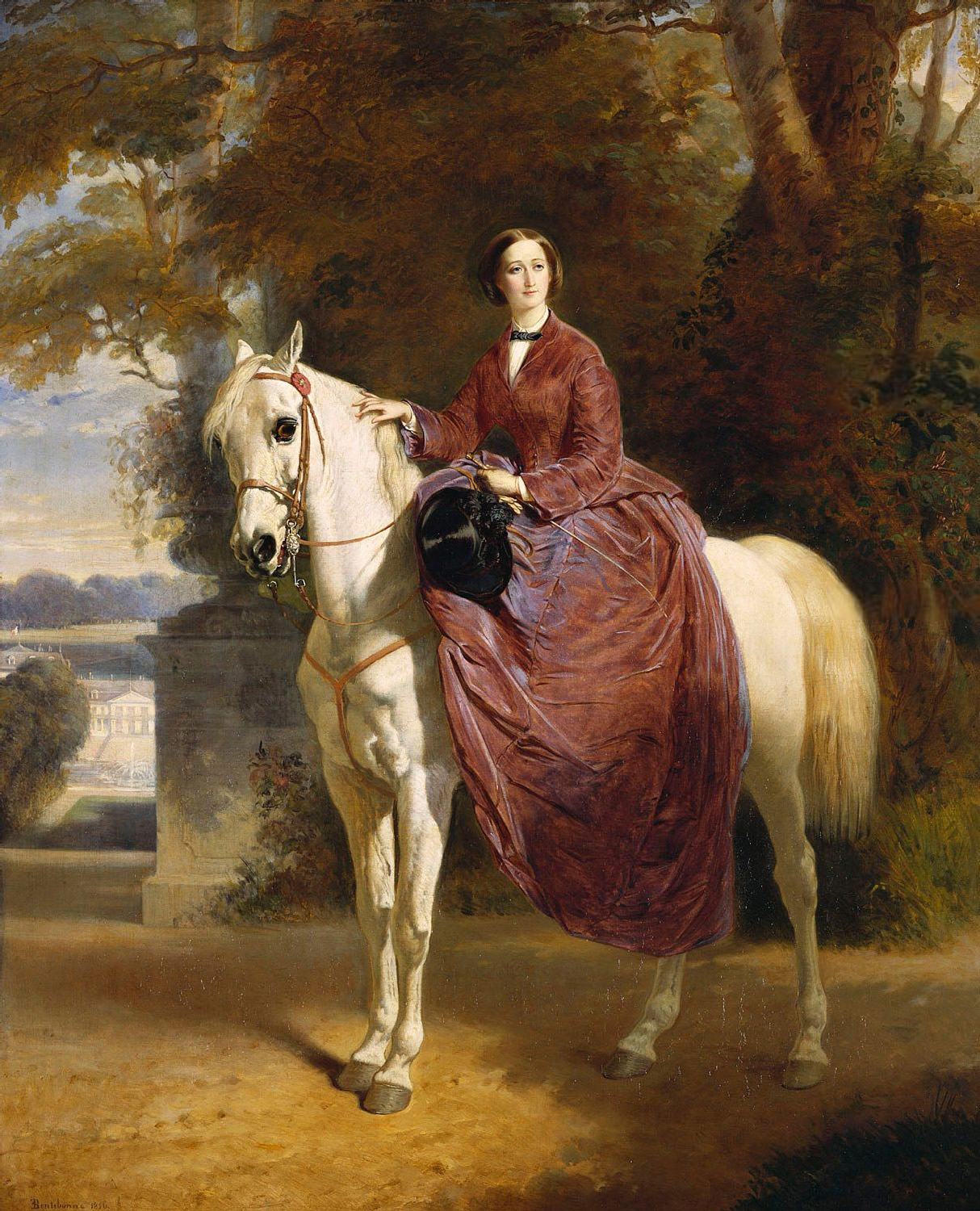
Eugénie, Empress of the French

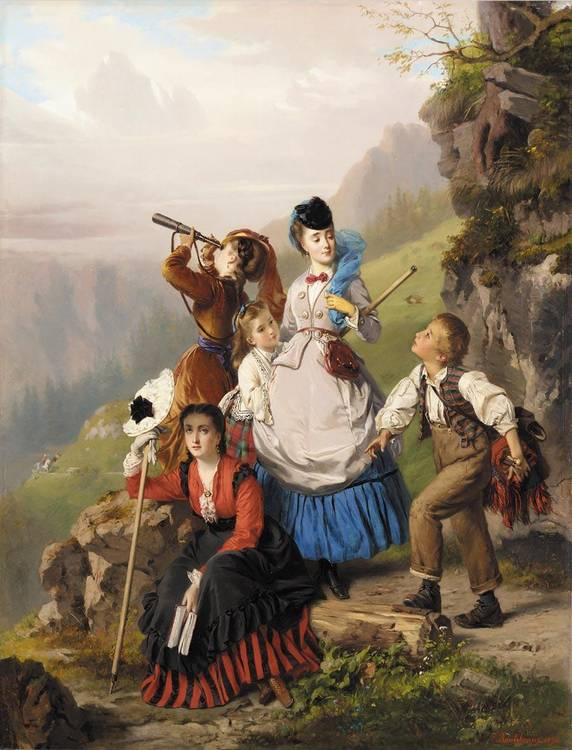
The Young Mountaineers, 1868

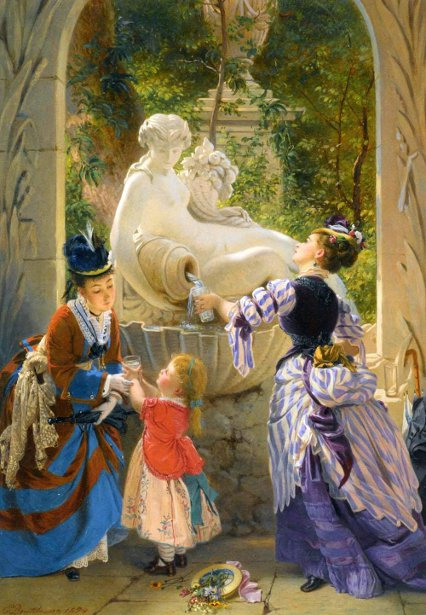
At the Fountain

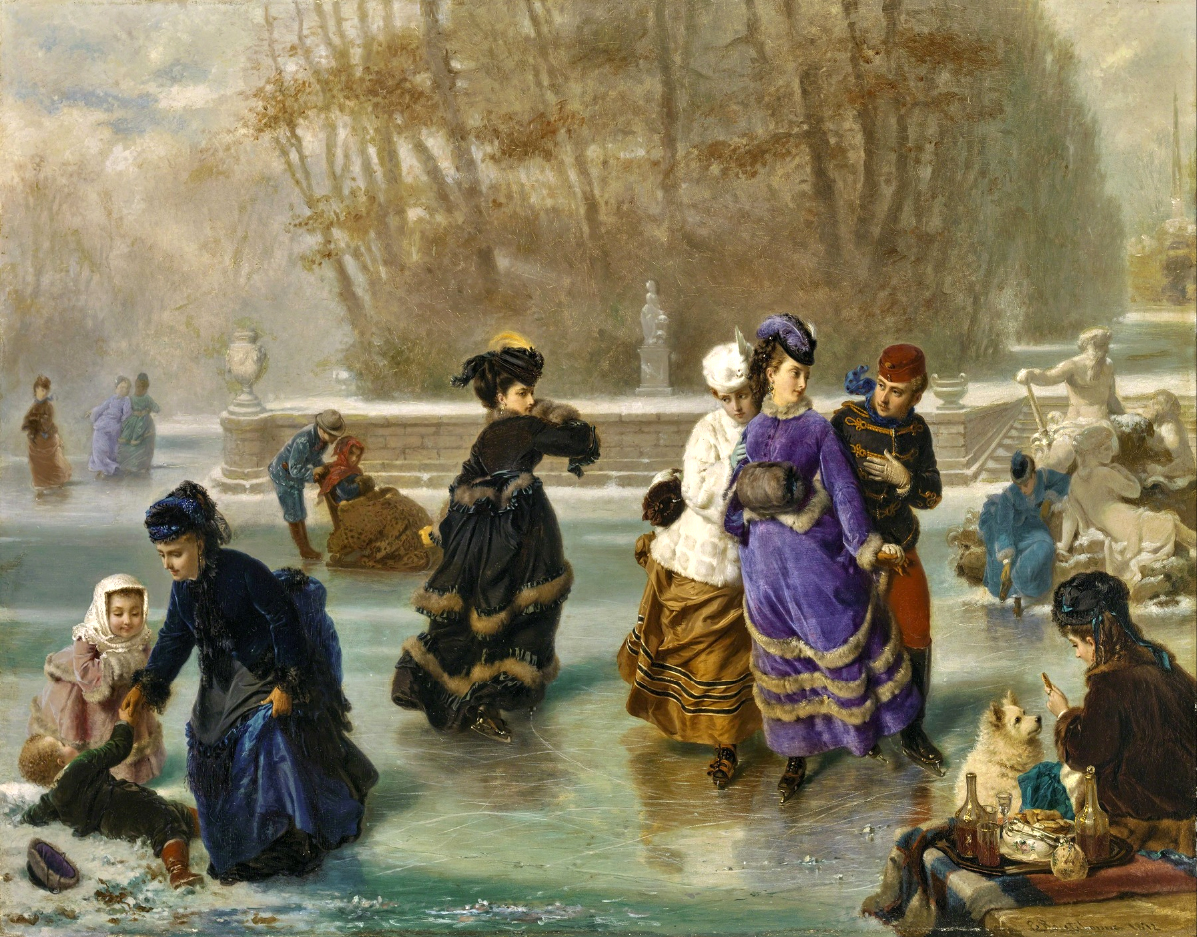
Ice Skating

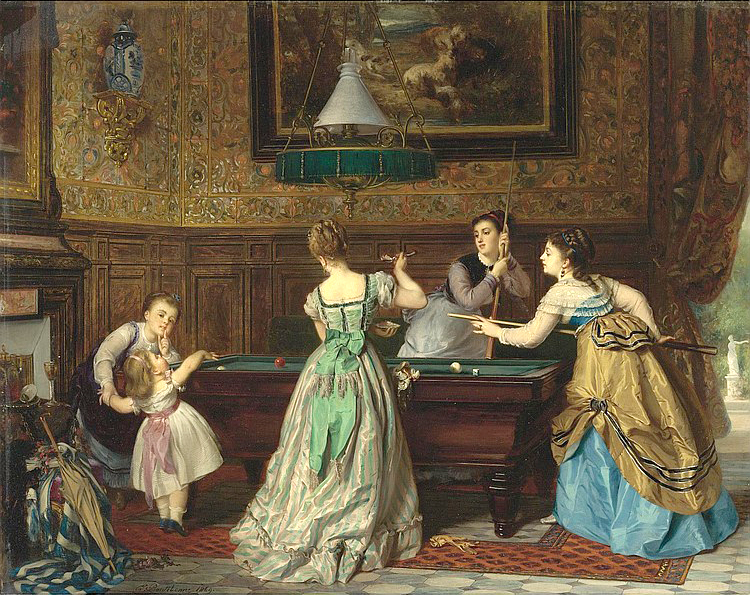
Ladies Playing Billiards, 1869

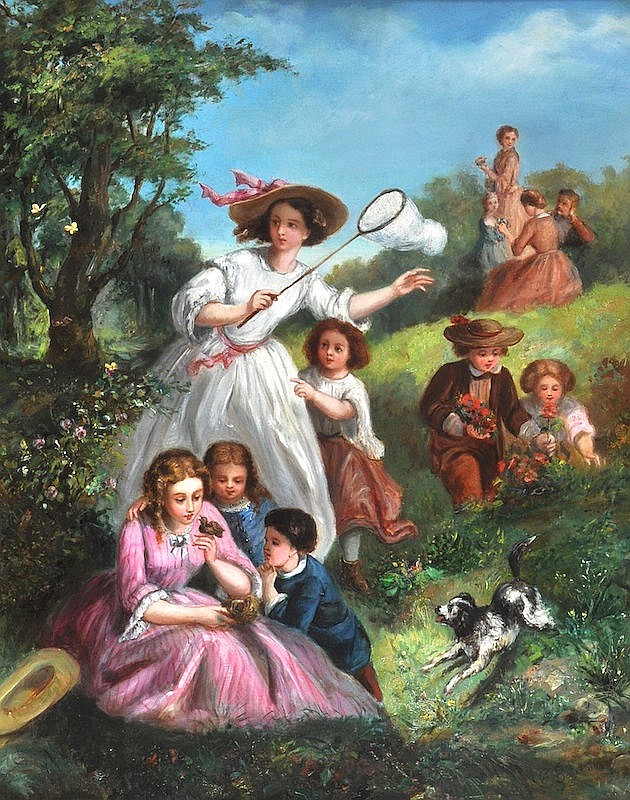
A Garden Scene

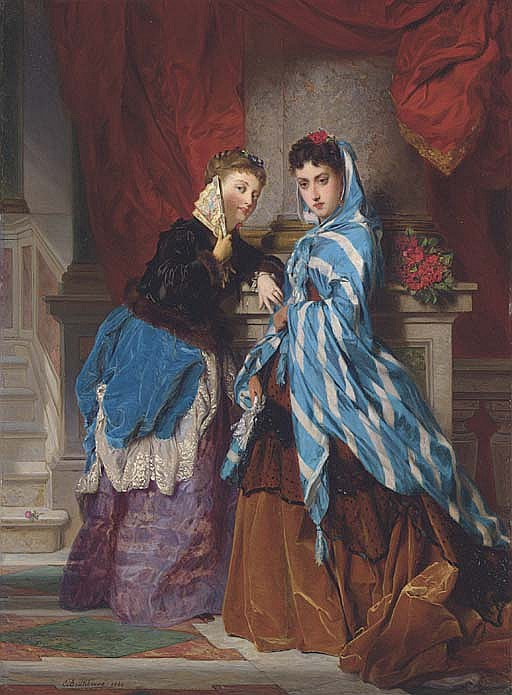
At the Opéra

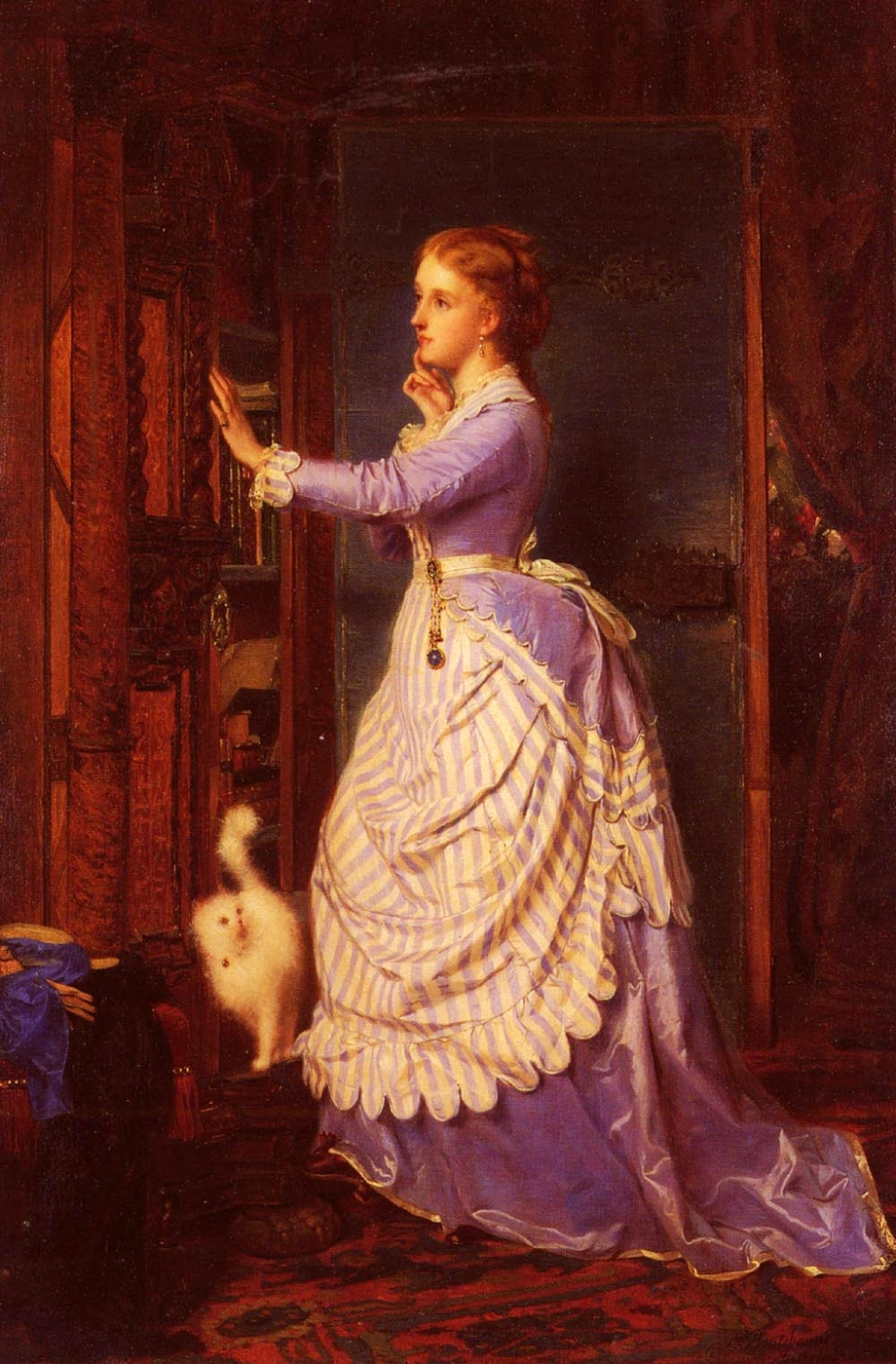
An Indecisive Moment, 1869

Walther von Hallwyl, 1865

Wilhelm Kempe, 1866
