= The Kiss (Munch) =

1897 painting by Edvard Munch

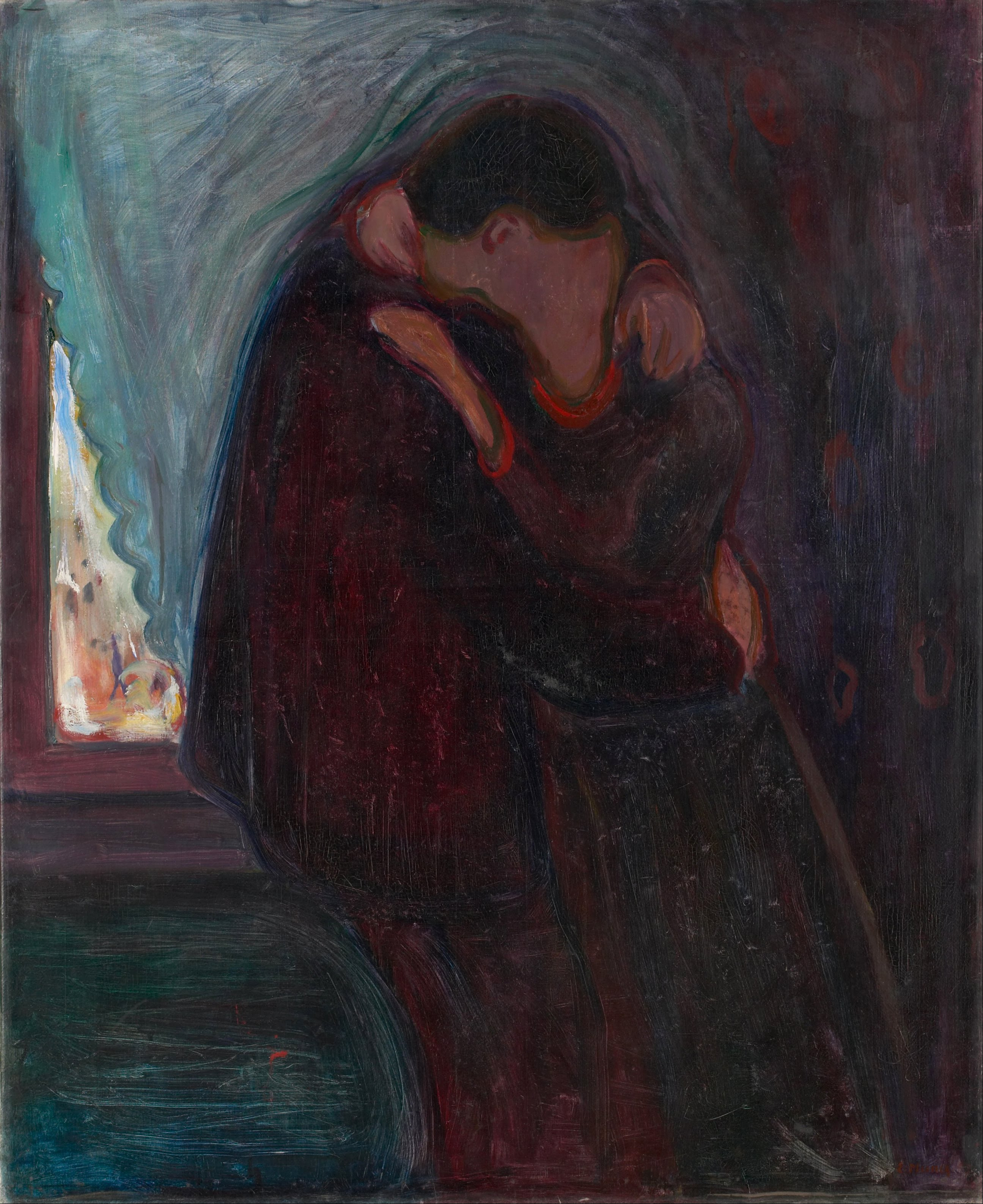
- Artist: Edvard Munch
- Year: 1897
- Medium: Oil on canvas
- Dimensions: 99 cm × 81 cm (39 in × 32 in)
- Location: Munch Museum; Oslo
- Accession: M0059

The Kiss is an oil painting on canvas completed by the Norwegian symbolist artist Edvard Munch in 1897. Part of his Frieze of Life, which depicts the stages of a relationship between men and women, The Kiss is a realization of a motif with which he had experimented since 1888/89: a couple kissing, their faces fusing as one in a symbolic representation of their unity. Exhibited as early as 1903, this work is held at the Munch Museum in Oslo.

== Description ==
The Kiss is an oil painting on canvas, measuring 81 by 99 centimetres (32 in × 39 in). It depicts a couple surrounded by darkness, with only a sliver of daylight showing through a window which is mostly covered by a curtain. They hold an embrace as they seemingly merge into one, their faces a single, featureless shape. Art critic Roberta Smith notes that Munch favored "long, somewhat slurpy brush strokes that were more stained than painted". The painting is similar to, though simpler than, another work with the same theme Munch produced in the same period.

== Background ==
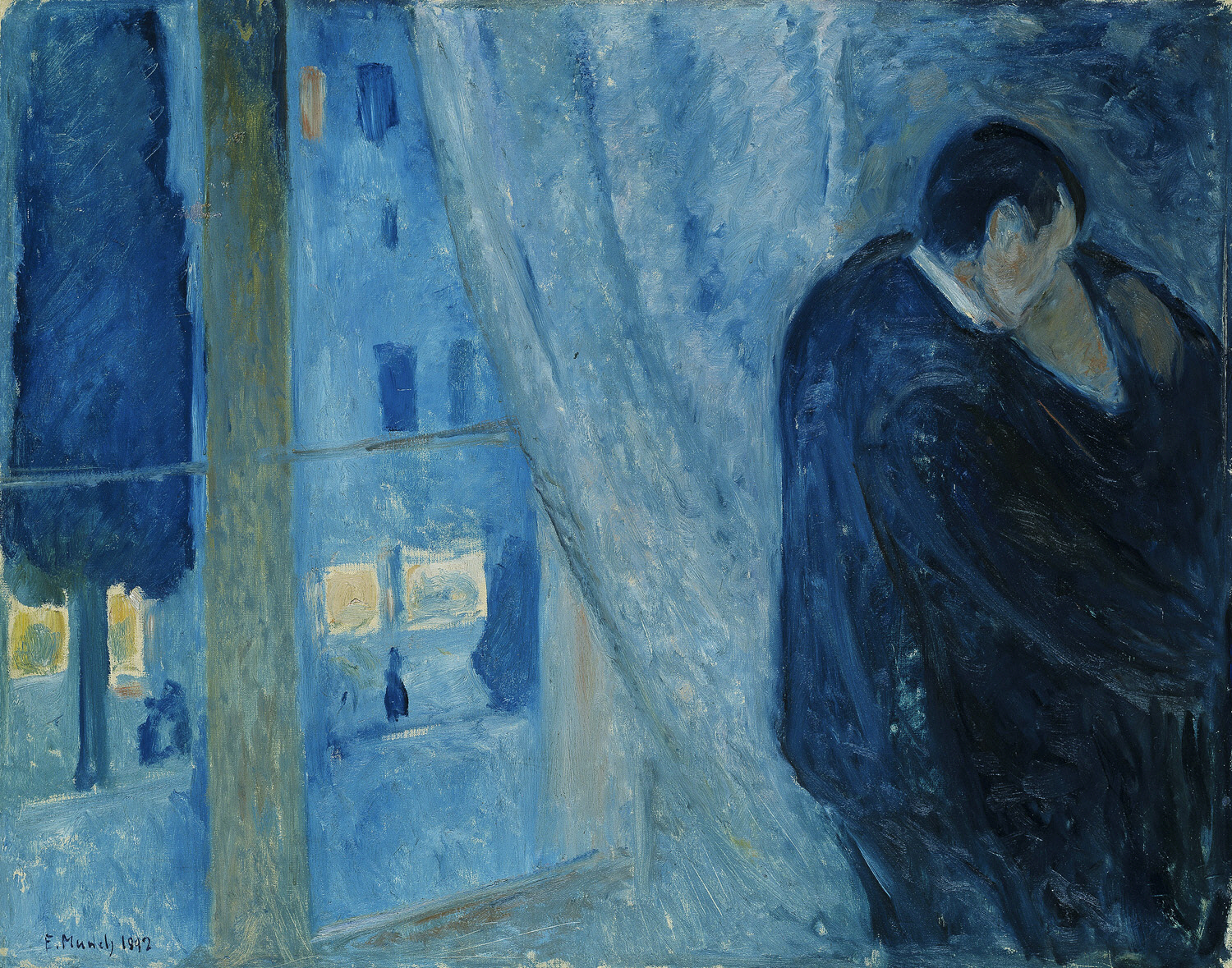
Kiss by the Window (1892), an earlier realization of the "kiss" motif

The Norwegian symbolist artist Edvard Munch (1863–1944) had to cope with disease, mental illness, and death in his family, as well as a strict and strongly religious father. During his lifetime he experienced disappointment in love and feeble health, causing him fits of melancholia; Munch also became an alcoholic. The artist never married. This influenced his artistic production and the emotional states of his paintings. "Most of Munch’s figures," writes Roberta Smith, "are not mad, but paralyzed by oceanic feelings of grief, jealousy, desire or despair that many people found shocking either for their eroticism, crude style or intimations of mental instability." Though shocking, his paintings are characterized by an emotional honesty and integrity that makes them thrilling.

Munch experimented with the motif of a couple kissing, both in painting and woodcuts, as early as 1888–89. In the numerous realizations of this motif there is a contrast between the world inside and outside of the room in which the couple is situated. The outside world appears vibrant and lively, whereas the interior of the room is timeless, with the couple frozen in their embrace. In this motif, the couple's abstract form, in which the faces of the two appear to be merged as one, indicates their sense of belongingness and togetherness. Later versions of the motif not only merged their faces, but also their bodies. The motif was part of a series Munch called the Frieze of Life, on which he spent more than 30 years of his career. The cycle depicts stages of a relationship between men and women and is part of what Munch called "the battle between men and women that is called love". It includes portrayals of attraction, courtship, realization, and disappointment.

== Analysis ==
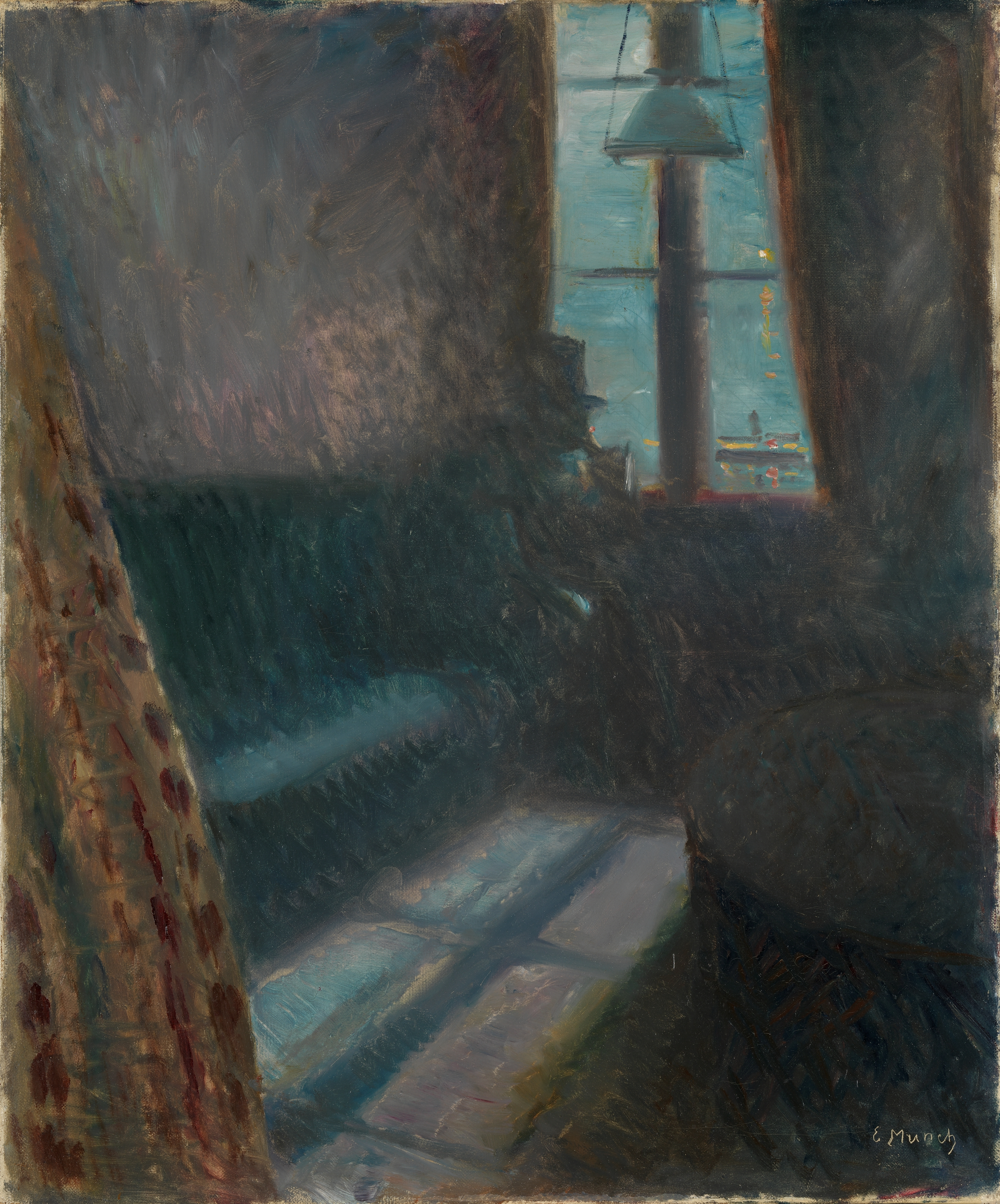
Night in Saint-Cloud (1890)

According to the Museum of Modern Art, the dark ambiance of The Kiss is representative of Munch's ambivalence regarding romance. In the 1897 painting, art historian Reinhold Heller finds it "virtually impossible" to separate the two figures, particularly where their faces meet and become one. He considers the depiction of the lovers to represent their unity while at the same time representing a threatening "loss of individuality, a loss of one's own existence and identity" which hints at death.

The author Stanisław Przybyszewski (1868–1927) was critical of the fused faces, finding them "look[ing] like a gigantic ear ... deaf in the ecstasy of the blood". The writer August Strindberg (1849–1912) gave a similar opinion, writing that the couple becomes "a fusion of two beings, of which the smaller, in the form of a carp, seems ready to devour the larger".

Owing to the similarity of the room in The Kiss to Munch's own, as represented in Night in Saint-Cloud, art critic Ulrich Bischoff considers the painting to have an autobiographical element.

== Provenance ==
The Kiss was exhibited in 1903 at Munch's show Love's Awakening, paired with a copy of his Madonna. The painting is now part of the collection of the Munch Museum in Oslo.

== See also ==
- List of paintings by Edvard Munch
- The Kiss, 1907 painting by Gustav Klimt

== Works cited ==
- Bischoff, Ulrich (2000). Edvard Munch: 1863–1944. Köln: Taschen. ISBN 978-3-8228-5971-1.
- Cordulack, Shelley Wood (2002). Edvard Munch and the Physiology of Symbolism. Madison, New Jersey: Fairleigh Dickinson University Press. ISBN 978-0-8386-3891-0.
- "Edvard Munch Master Prints". Washington, D.C.: National Gallery of Art. 2010. Archived from the original on 24 September 2015.
- "Edvard Munch. The Kiss. 1897". Museum of Modern Art.
- Henning, Joel (25 February 2009). "Not All His Inspirations Were Creepy". The Wall Street Journal. Archived from the original on 10 May 2015.
- Smith, Roberta (12 February 2009). "So Typecast You Could Scream". The New York Times. p. C27.
- "The Kiss". Google Cultural Institute. Archived from the original on 27 July 2015.
