= Nikola Avramov =

Bulgarian painter

Nikola Vasilev Avramov (Bulgarian: Никола Василев Аврамов) (21 May 1897 – 15 June 1945) was a Bulgarian painter. He was born on 21 May 1897 in Yambol and died on 15 June 1945 in Sofia.

Avramov is known for his still-life paintings.

== Gallery ==
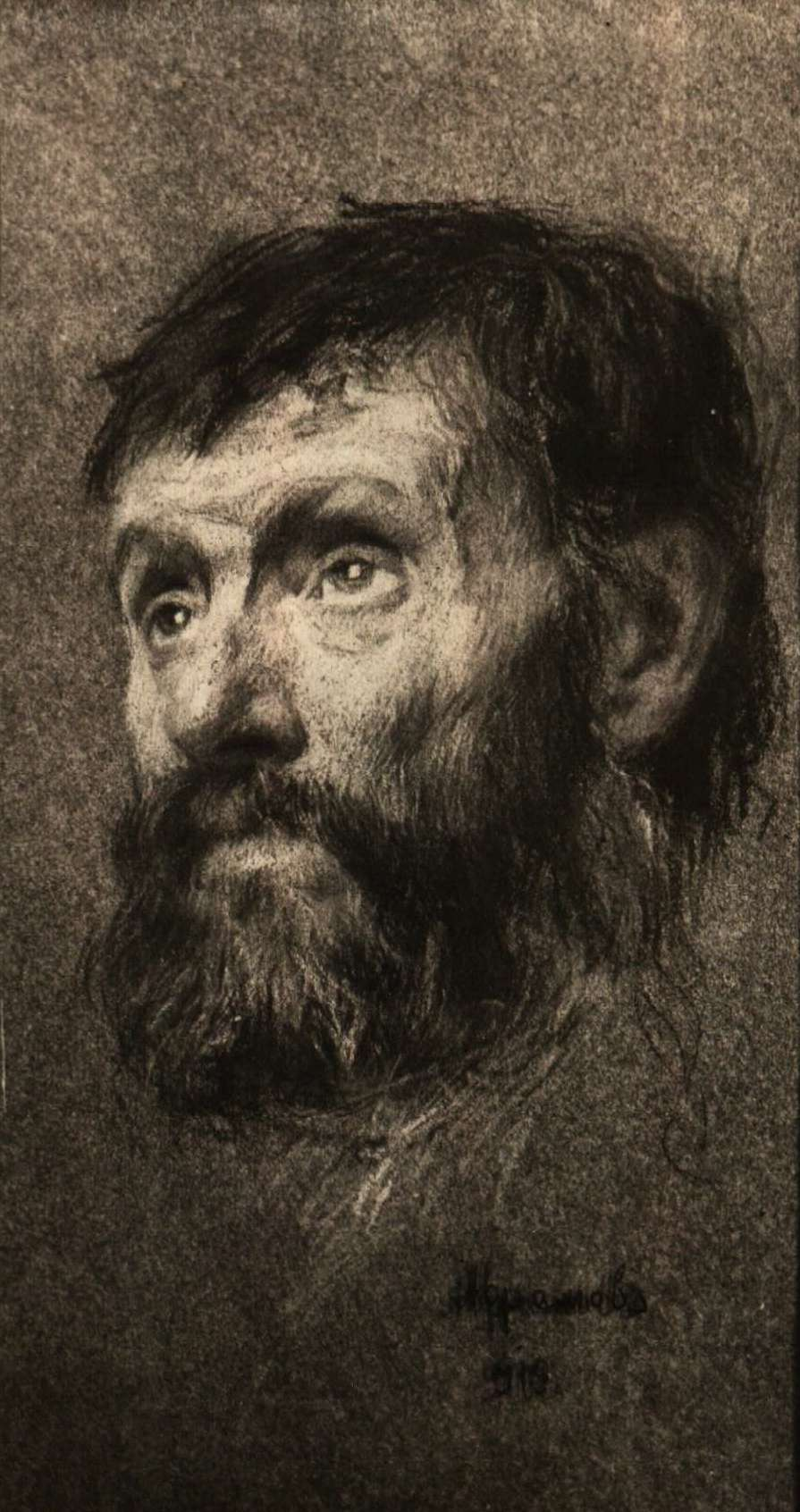

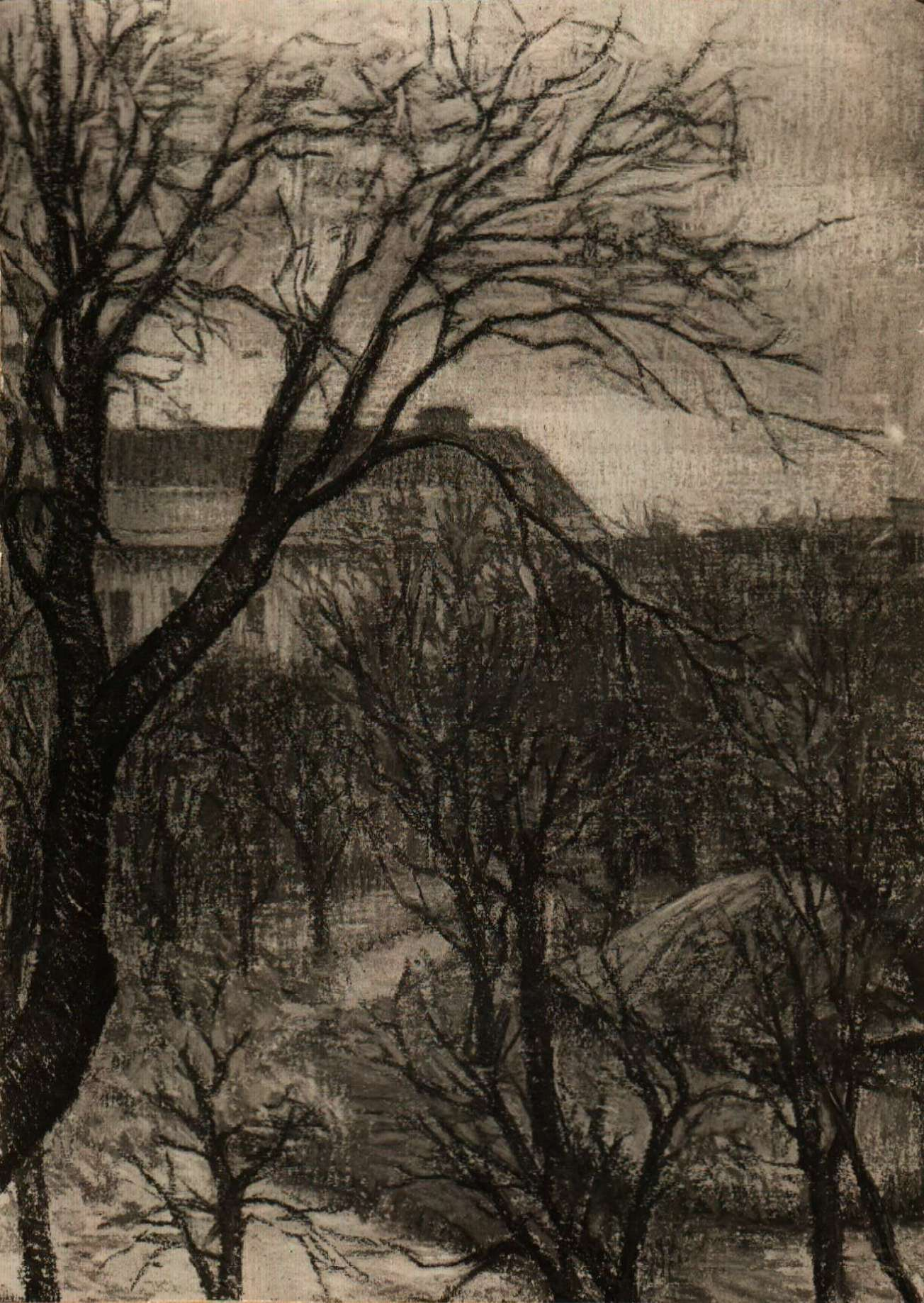

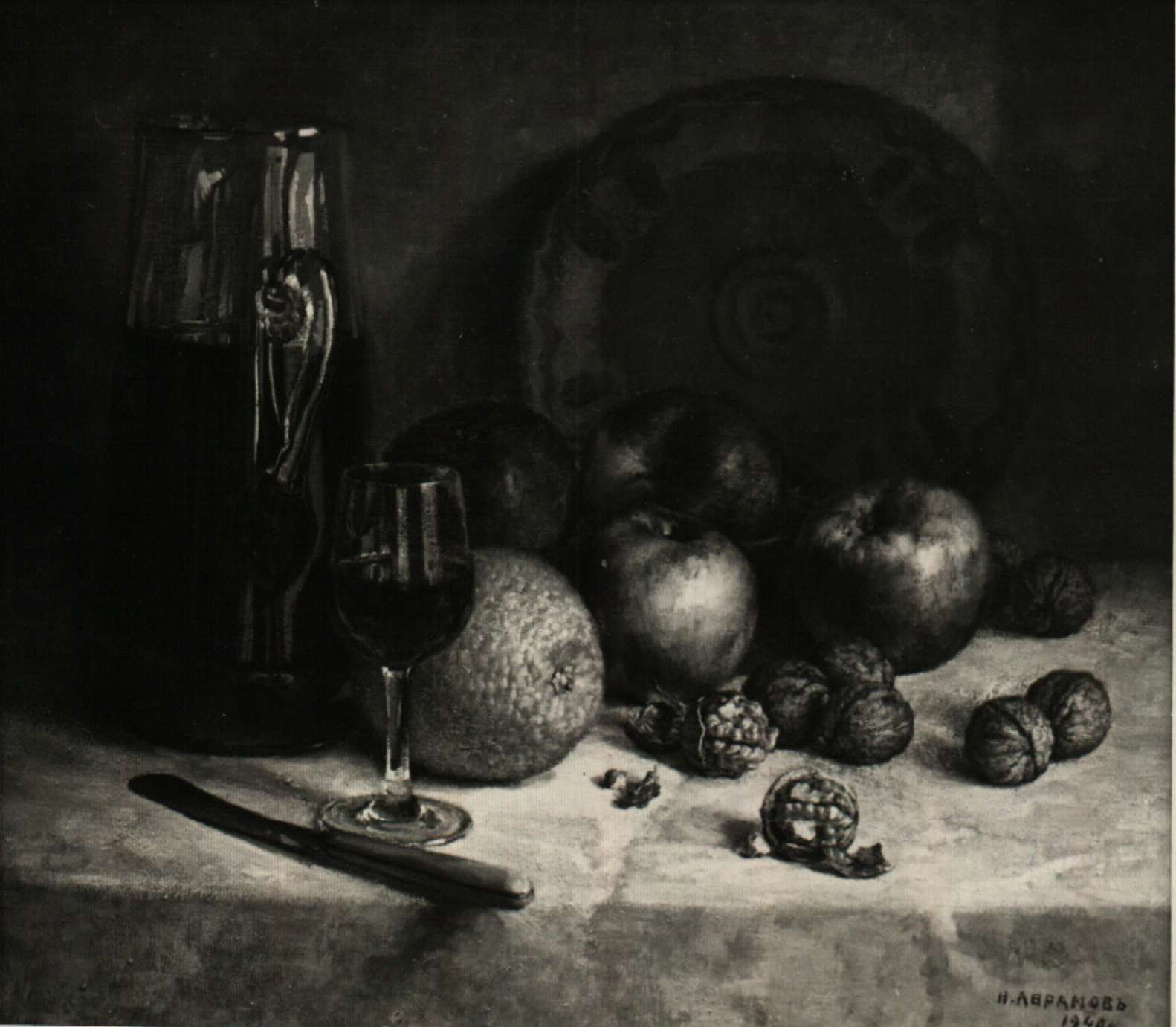

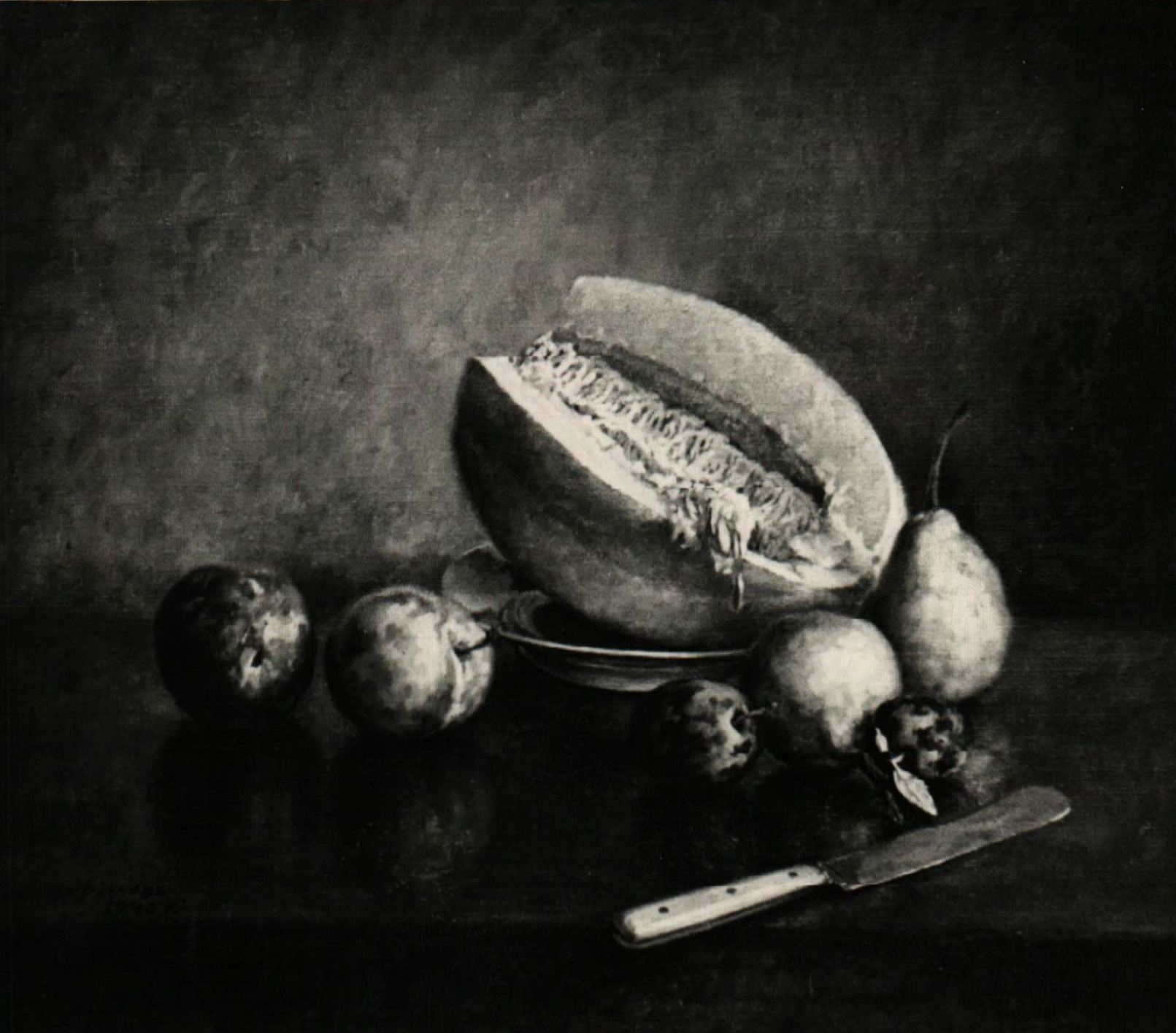
