= Arthur Wardle =

English painter

Arthur Wardle (1864–1949) was a British painter.

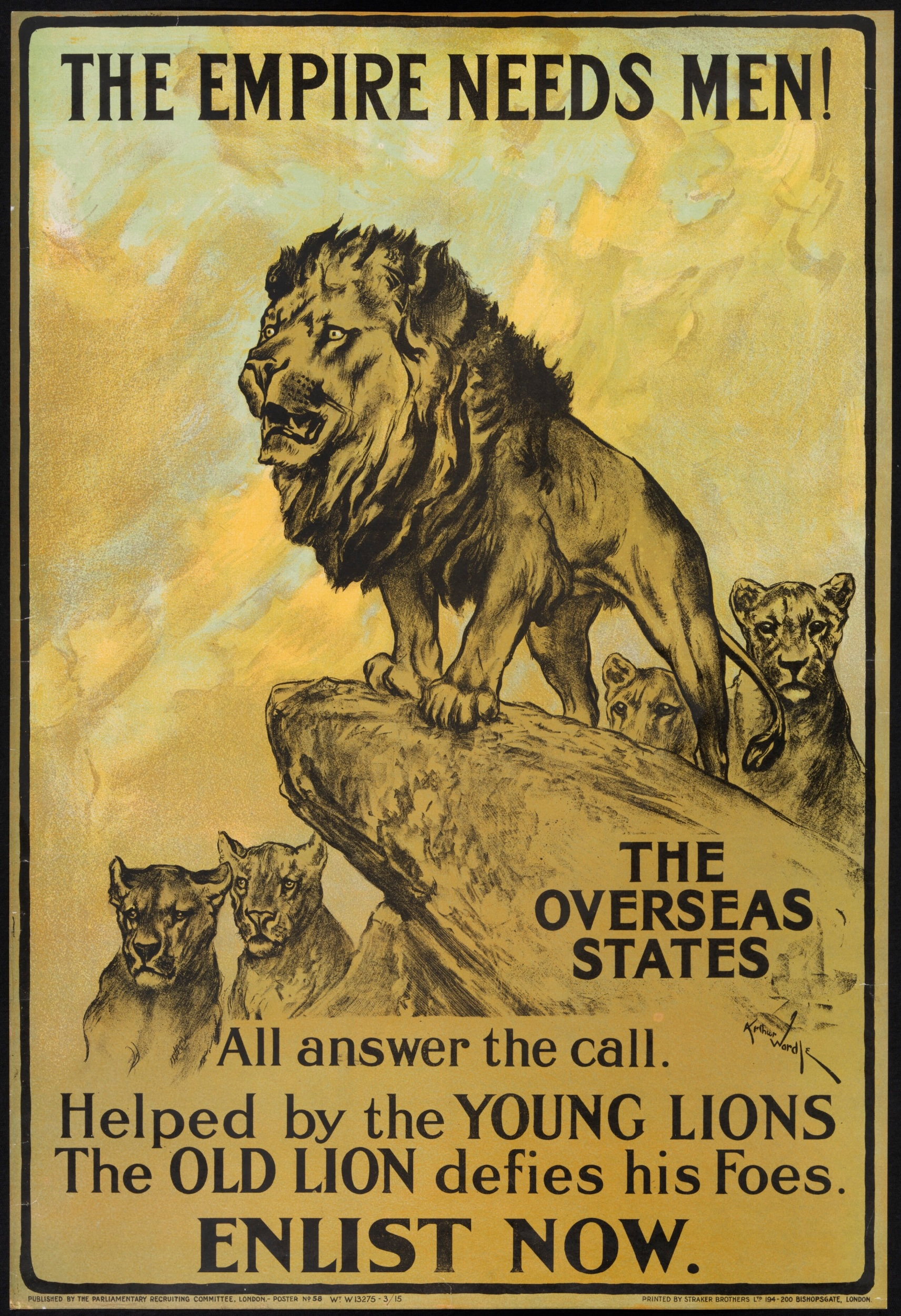
The Parliamentary Recruiting Committee produced this First World War poster. Designed by Arthur Wardle, the poster urges men from the Dominions of the British Empire to enlist in the war effort.

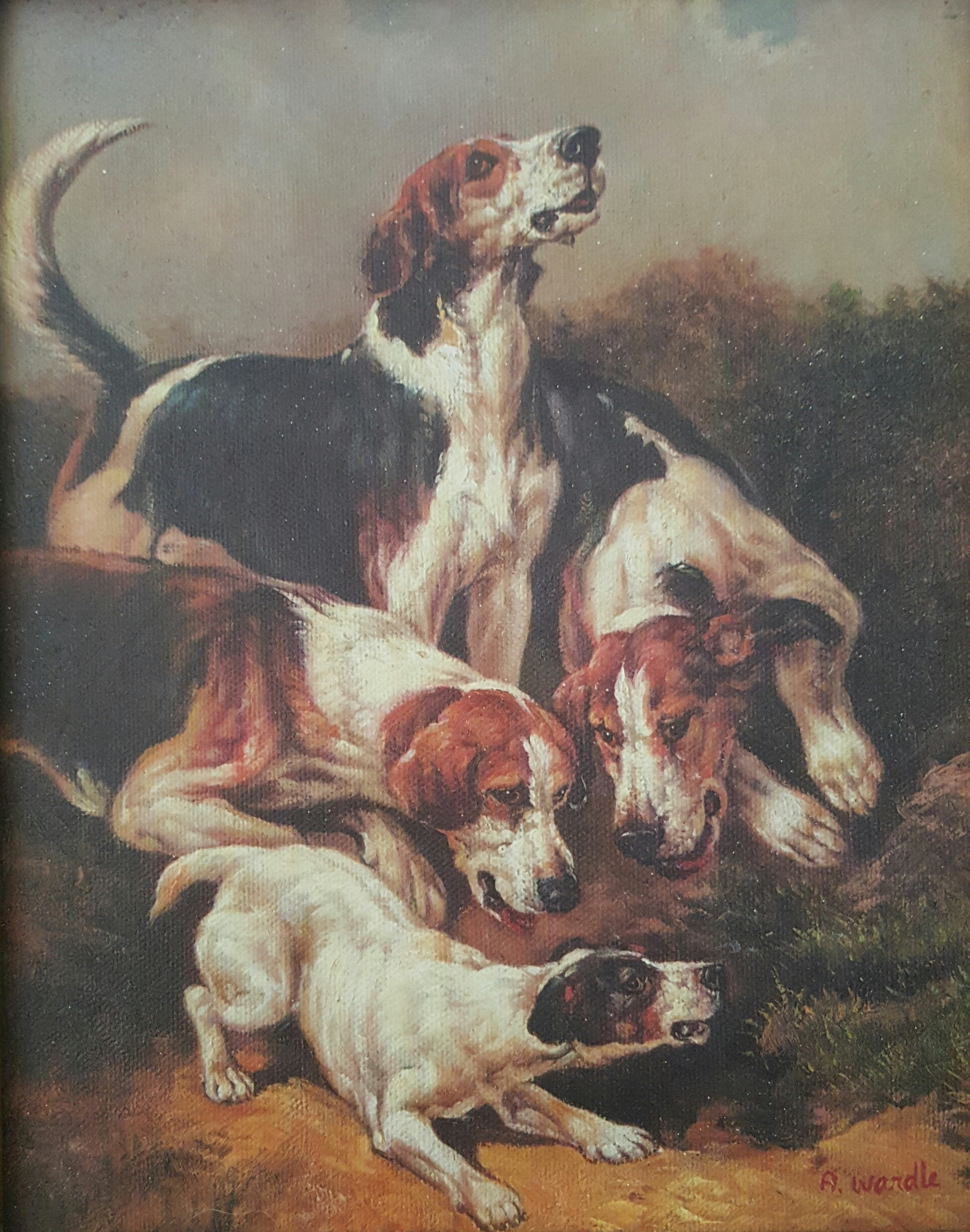
Hunting dogs

Born in London, aged just sixteen Wardle had a piece displayed at the Royal Academy. His first exhibit was a study of cattle by the River Thames, leading to a lifelong interest in painting animals. In 1880 Wardle lived in Oakley Square, Camden, but artistic success enabled him to move to the more upmarket 34 Alma Square in St John's Wood by 1892. Wardle was prolific; until 1936 he exhibited more than 100 works at the Royal Academy, as well as the Society of British Artists at Suffolk Street. He painted a variety of animal subjects with equal skill but his work may be divided into two categories, domestic and exotic; animals from overseas including leopards, polar bears and tigers such as The Deer-Stealer (1915) were painted from sketches that he made at London Zoo. He is considered equally proficient in oils, watercolours and pastels and was elected to the Pastel Society in 1911 and became a member of the Royal Institute of Painters in Water Colours in 1922. In 1931 he held his first one-man exhibition at the Fine Art Society and in 1935 the Vicar's Gallery put on an exhibition of his work. He also exhibited in Paris. By 1936 Wardle had moved to West London.

His career was highly successful and his works continue to be sought after and widely reproduced on postcards, calendars and boxes of chocolates. He remains one of the widely known dog painters of the 19th and 20th centuries, and he is particularly known for his paintings of terriers. Wardle painted what is probably the best known painting of the Fox Terrier in its modern form, The Totteridge XI (1897). The painting was commissioned by famed smooth fox terrier breeder Francis Redmond; Wardle painted a number of Redmond's dogs. The original is in the gallery of The Kennel Club in London.

Arthur Wardle died on 16 July 1949.
