= The Totteridge XI =

1897 painting by Arthur Wardle

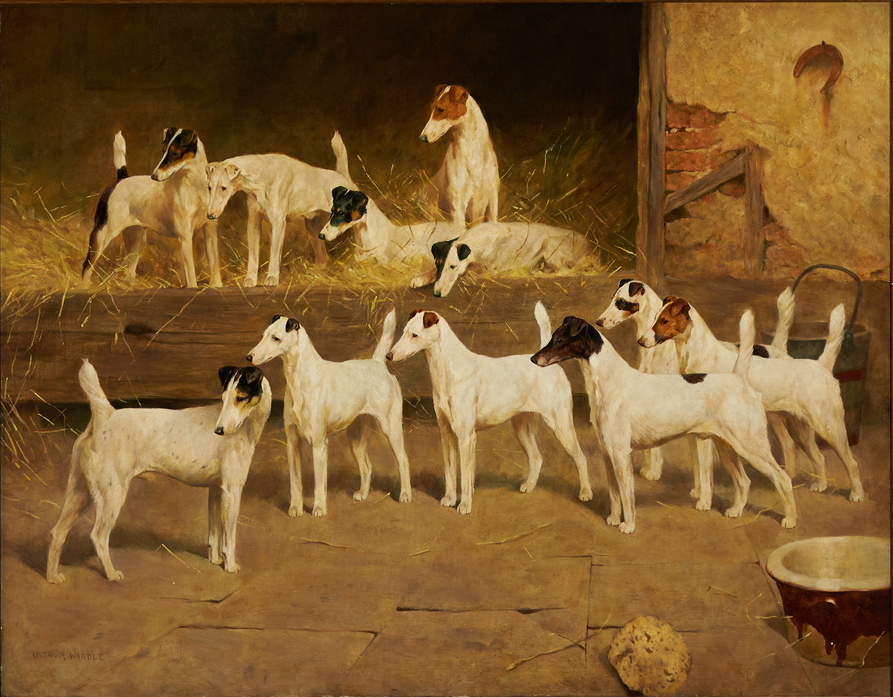
- Artist: Arthur Wardle
- Year: 1897
- Medium: Oil on canvas
- Location: The Kennel Club Art Gallery; London
- Owner: The Kennel Club

The Totteridge XI is an 1897 oil on canvas work by English painter Arthur Wardle. The painting shows eleven of Francis Redmond's Smooth Fox Terrier show dogs, although the artist remarked several years after creating it that the dogs were significantly closer to the breed standard in the painting than they were in real life. The painting is now owned by The Kennel Club, and is on display at their art gallery in London.

== Background ==
The Totteridge XI was painted by experienced animal painter Arthur Wardle, and was commissioned by Fox Terrier breeder Francis Redmond. Redmond took a high level of interest in the painting, with Wardle remarking many years later, "Mr Redmond stood over me and made me 'perfect' all his dogs – shorten their backs, lengthen their necks and muzzles, make their ears and feet smaller than they really were – and so on. None of them were half as good as in their picture". Such were the corrections insisted upon by Redmond, that an outline of a completed painted over dog can be seen to the right of the painting, and where corrections were made to individual dogs, the original lines are still hazily visible.

Although Redmond was Chairman of the Kennel Club between 1922 and 1925, the painting came into the possession of the club in 1940 from Captain Tudor Crosthwaite on behalf of Redmond's niece, Sarah Talbot. The painting was the star exhibit during a temporary exhibition at the Kennel Club in London, entitled "The Fox Terrier in Art". A copy was made from the original for the American Kennel Club collection in 1937.

== Aesthetics ==
The painting depicts eleven Smooth Fox Terrier show dogs from Francis Redmond's kennel. The dogs are (clockwise from back left), Dryad, Ch. Daddy, Dame, Dalby, Divorcee, Diamond Court, Ch. Donnington, Ch. D'Orsay, Ch. Dame Fortune, Ch. Donna Fortune, and Ch. Dominie. Each dog was situated so that it appeared in a conformation show pose. It was described by Edward Cecil Ash in his book Dogs: their history and development (1927) as being one of Wardle's finest works.
