= Ogata Gekkō =

Japanese artist (1859-1920)

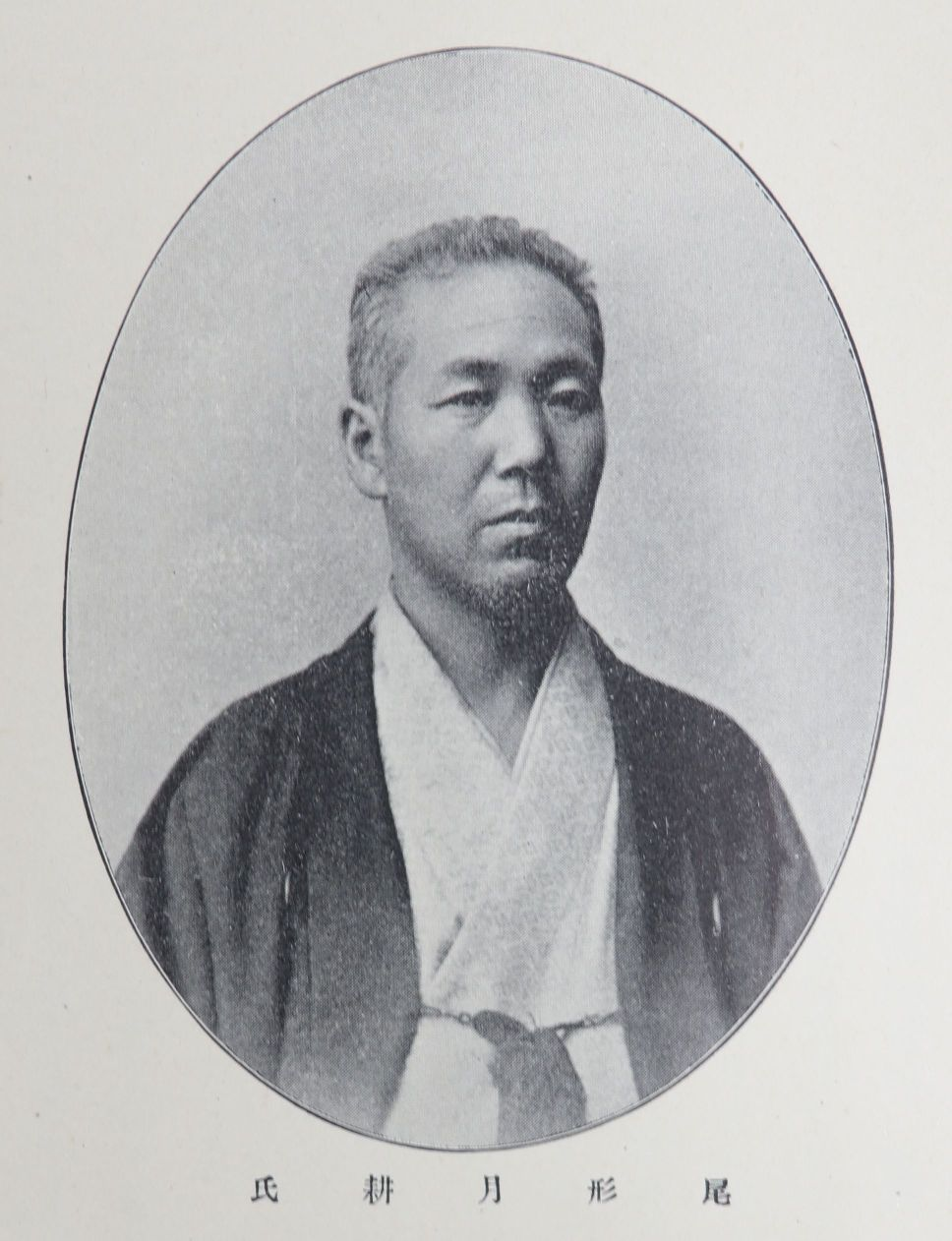

Ogata Gekkō (尾形月耕; 1859 – 1 October 1920) was a Japanese artist best known as a painter and a designer of ukiyo-e woodblock prints. He was self-taught in art, won numerous national and international prizes, and was one of the earliest Japanese artists to win an international audience.

== Biography ==
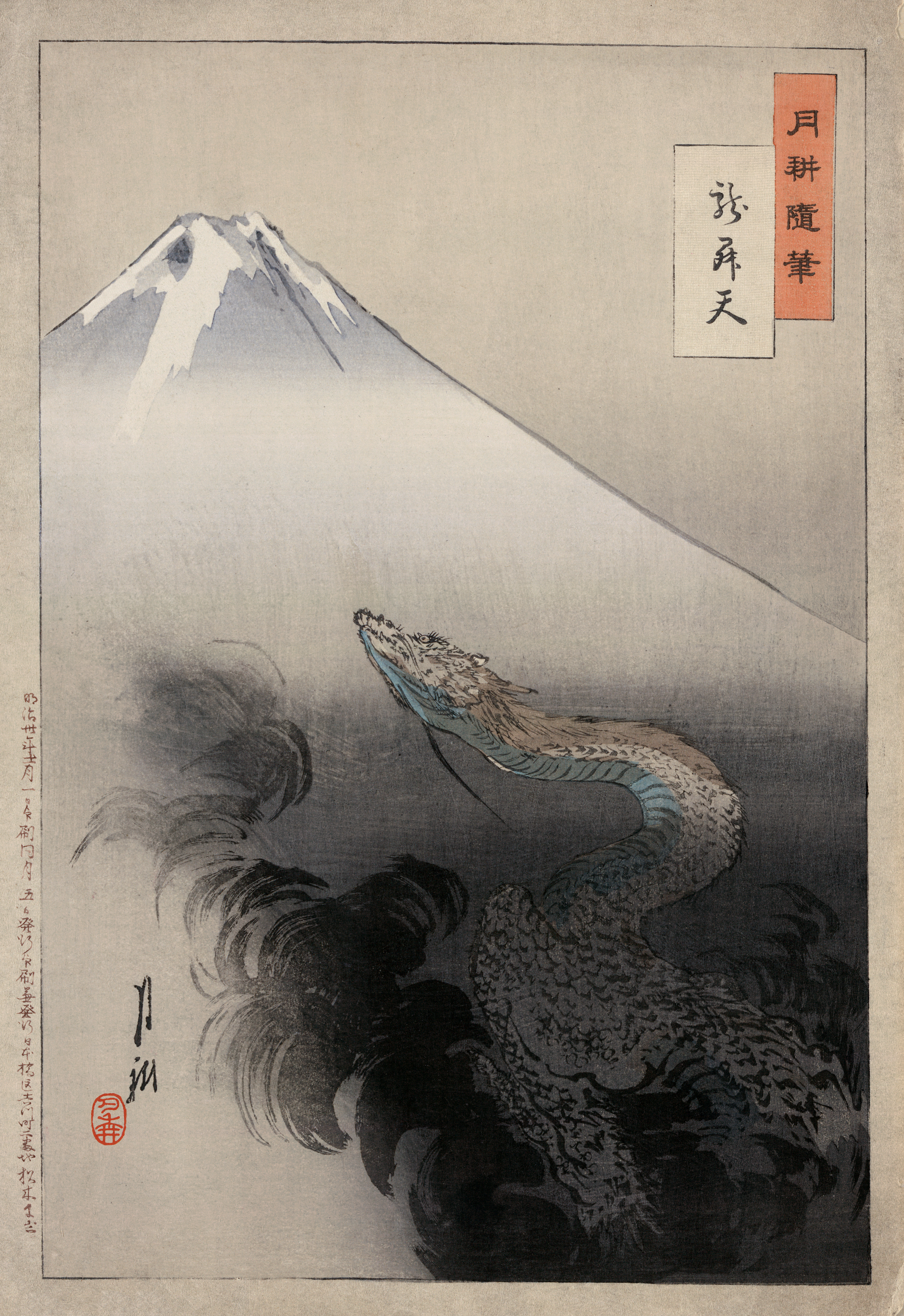
Ryūshōten (龍昇天, "Dragon Rising up to Heaven") A dragon ascends towards the heavens with Mount Fuji in the background in this print from Gekko's Views of Mount Fuji.

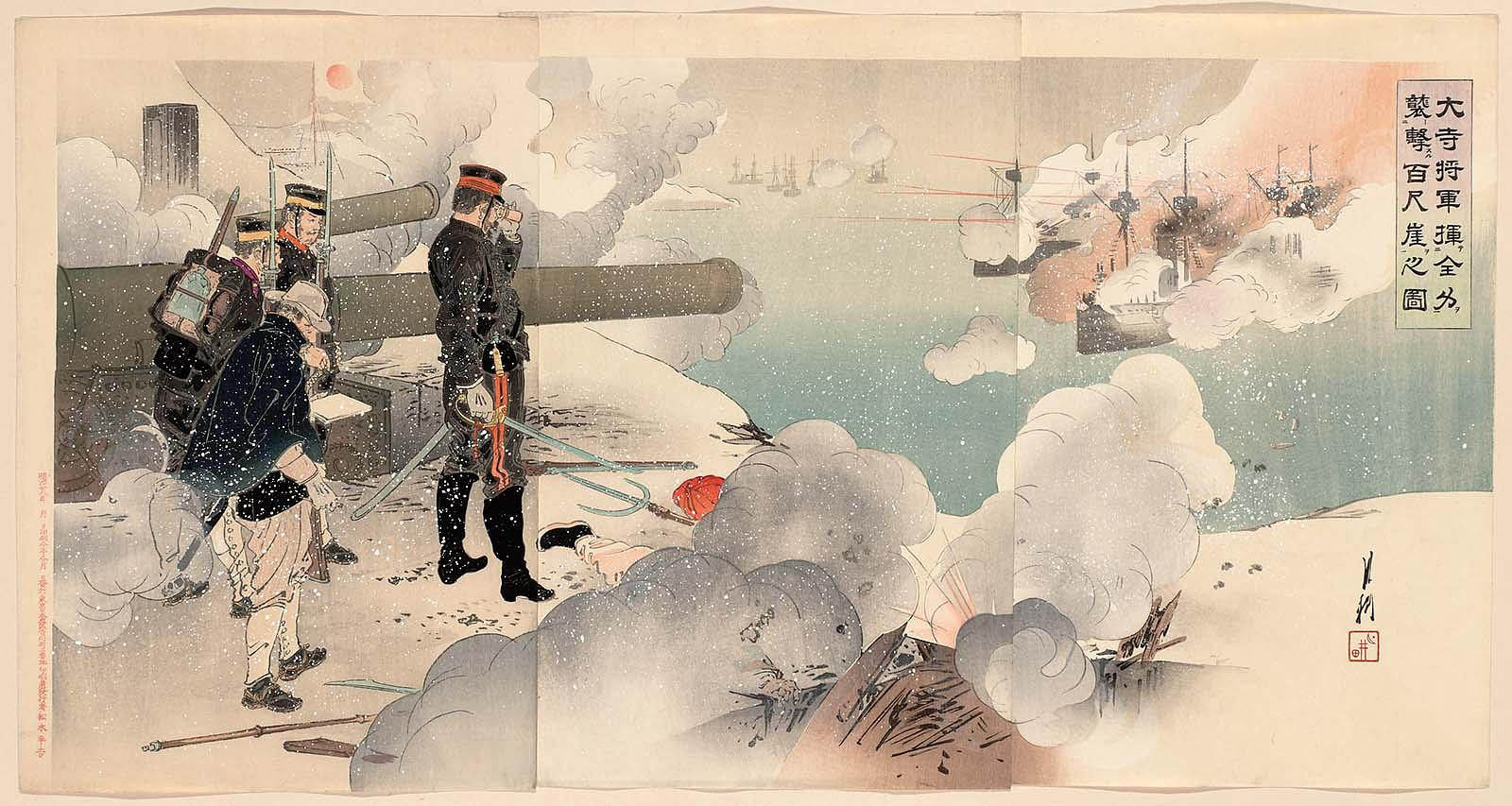
An incident in the Battle of Weihaiwei during the First Sino-Japanese War. Major General Ōdera at the cliff, 1895 — Woodblock print by Ogata Gekkō, ink and color on paper triptych; 37.9 x 72.8 cm (14 15/16 x 28 11/16 in.) in the collection of the Museum of Fine Arts, Boston.

Gekkō was born Nakagami Masanosuke (名鏡 正之助) in Kyōbashi Yazaemon-chō in Edo (modern Tokyo) in 1859. His father, tradesman Nakagami Seijirō (名鏡 清次郎), died in 1876, and Gekkō took to work in a lantern shop in Kyōbashi Yumi-chō.

Gekkō was self-taught in art and began decorating porcelain and rickshaws, and designing flyers for the pleasure quarters. His rickshaw designs were exhibited at an exhibition of industrial design interiors as examples of refined contemporary art, and he was soon recognised by prominent figures in the art world, including the painter Kawanabe Kyōsai, who is credited with discovering him. His early style shows the influence of the painter Kikuchi Yōsai. His talent was soon recognised by leading figures in the art world, including the painter Kawanabe Kyōsai, who is credited with having discovered him. Around 1881, he took the surname Ogata at the insistence of a descendant of the painter Ogata Kōrin. his descendant was Ogata Kōya, then head of the Ogata family. He soon was designing prints and illustrating books and newspapers.

Gekkō's early career was built around illustration. Initially working as a hanshita artist providing newspaper illustrations, he moved on to e-iri-bon (illustrated books); the first known example of his book-illustration work is a four-volume edition of the serialised novel Chinsetsu Yumiharizuki by Kyokutei Bakin, published in March 1883. He supplied only a handful of uncredited images for these books, but in subsequent years became the principal artist for more than fifty books, including a fifty-volume edition of Nansō Satomi Hakkenden, and illustrated several books published simultaneously in English, Chinese and Japanese; some of the images in these books were fairly large colour woodblock prints rather than simple black-and-white sketches.

In 1885, Gekkō exhibited in the Painting Appreciation Society, and he became acquainted with art scholars Ernest Fenellosa and Okakura Kakuzō.

In 1886, Gekkō produced the print series Gekkō Zuihitsu (月耕随筆, "Gekkō’s Random Sketches"), published the following year by Matsuki Heikichi and consisting of forty-seven ōban tate-e prints plus a frontispiece. The subjects are not focused on any single theme, ranging instead across history and mythology to depict warriors, poets and ordinary people alike; only the series' title cartouche and Gekkō's characteristic composition and generally muted colours identify the prints as belonging to a single series. In 1888, he married an art student of his, Tai Kiku—his second marriage—and changed his family name to Tai. He was a judge in the Japan Youth Painting Association, which he helped found in 1891. The First Sino-Japanese War was the subject of a number of triptychs he designed in 1894–1895.

Despite his artistic reputation, Gekkō continued to produce both woodblock prints and lithographs for magazines including Bungei Kurabu, Fūzoku Gahō and Hansei Zasshi, and served as a war correspondent during the Sino-Japanese War. Between 1894 and 1903 he produced twenty-one volumes of sketchbook albums known as Gekkō manga, still regarded today as a model for aspiring artists, and he continued to work occasionally for newspapers until 1910.

From the 1890s, Gekkō won a number of national and international art prizes. He was one of the earliest Japanese artists to win international attention. At the World's Columbian Exposition in Chicago in 1893, he won a prize for Edo Sannō matsuri (江戸山王祭, "Edo’s Sannō Festival"), and in 1904, he won the Gold Prize for the series Fuji hyakkei (富士百景, "One Hundred Views of Mount Fuji") at the Louisiana Purchase Exposition. His work was exhibited at the Exposition Universelle in Paris in 1900 and at the Japan-British Exhibition in London in 1910. In 1898, at the Japan Art Association, Emperor Meiji bought his painting Soga yo-uchi (曽我夜討, "Night Attack of the Soga"). He won third prize at the sixth Ministry of Education Art Exhibition in 1912.

Gekkō is said to have broken many of the conventions of print production: carvers and printers typically required designers to supply clear lines and separated colours, but Gekkō challenged these requirements, making their work increasingly complex. Although his techniques were thoroughly modern, he considered himself firmly rooted in the ukiyo-e tradition, paying tribute to it with an early print series, Ukiyo Jūnikagetsu, as well as with a series based on the Tale of Genji and a series dedicated to the Forty-seven rōnin.

Gekkō died on 1 October 1920 in Shin-Ogawamachi in Ushigome Ward of Tokyo at age 61. His art names include Kagyōrō, Meikyōsai, Kiyū, and Rōsai. He had few students, the best-known of whom was Kōgyo Tsukioka, the adopted son of Yoshitoshi.

== Style ==
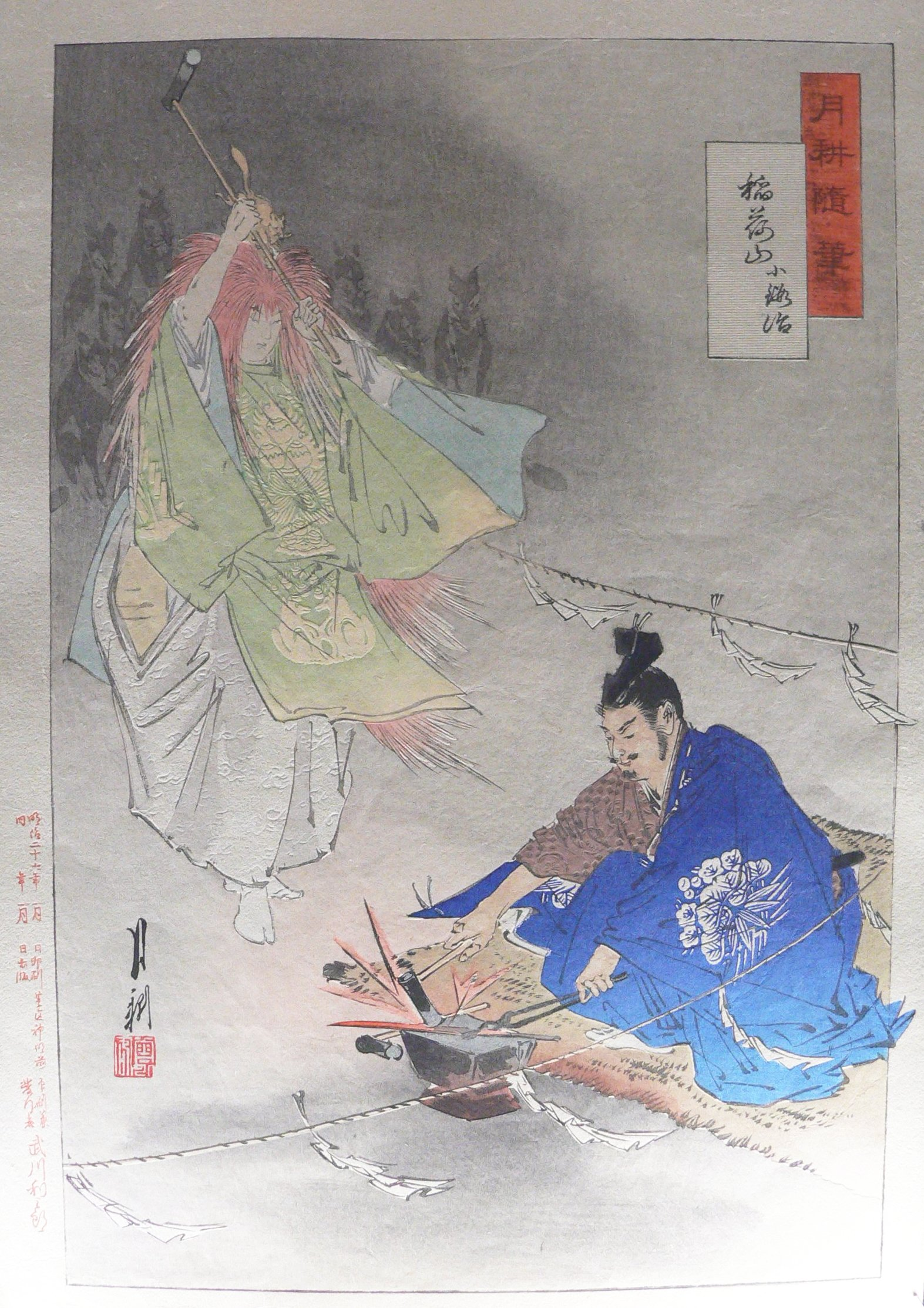
The swordsmith Munechika being aided by a kitsune fox spirit, in a print by Gekkō.

His work was originally closely based upon that of Kikuchi Yōsai; and he was inspired by Hokusai, creating a series of one hundred prints of Mount Fuji. However, he did develop his own style, with significant stylistic elements from nihonga.

Having begun his career as a painter and self-taught illustrator, and working with a looser approach to the conventions of the print medium, Gekkō achieved a pictorial quality in many of his prints previously considered impossible for the format: much like a Turner watercolour, his prints create the illusion of brushstrokes, with colours blending into and flooding one another in distinctive, unconventional perspectives. Together with Watanabe Seitei, Gekkō is credited with developing the sashiage technique, which simulates watercolour effects in woodblock printing.; this distinctive style is fully realised in his triptych series Bijin Meisho Awase, reaches its fullest expression in the Fuji hyakkei series, and appears in many of the shishikiban prints he made towards the end of his career.

Gekkō was among the artists whose artwork informed the Japanese populace about the progress of naval and land war known today as the First Sino-Japanese War of 1894–1895. A number of Gekkō's war images were published in Seishin Bidan by Yokoyama Ryohachi.

An impression of the Haiyang Island (Kaiyoto) Naval Battle in 1894 was prepared in a large-scale quadruptich format.

Among the widely circulated Sino-Japanese triptych images of the war, which were created by Gekkō include:

- Japanese Officers and Soldiers Fight Bravely at Fenghuangcheng
- The Japanese First Army Advances Toward Mukden
- The Japanese Navy Victorious Off Takushan
- Captain Osawa and Six Others From the Warship Yaeyama Close in on Yungcheng Bay
- Presenting a Portentous Eagle to the Emperor
- Popular Viewing of the Captured Chinese Warship Chenyuen
- Japanese and Chinese Dignitaries Accomplish Their Missions in Successfully Concluding a Peace Treaty

== Selected works ==
Gekkō's published work encompasses 46 works in 48 publications in 2 languages and 68 library holdings.

- 1905 – 夢の三郎 (Yume no Saburō) OCLC 229891974
- 1898 – 月耕画圃 (Gekkō gaho) 国立国会図書館デジタルコレクション
- 1895 – 以呂波引月耕漫画 (Irohabiki Gekkō manga) OCLC 046354614
- 1885 – 新說小簾の月 (Shinsetsu osu no tsuki) OCLC 033798610

== Gallery ==
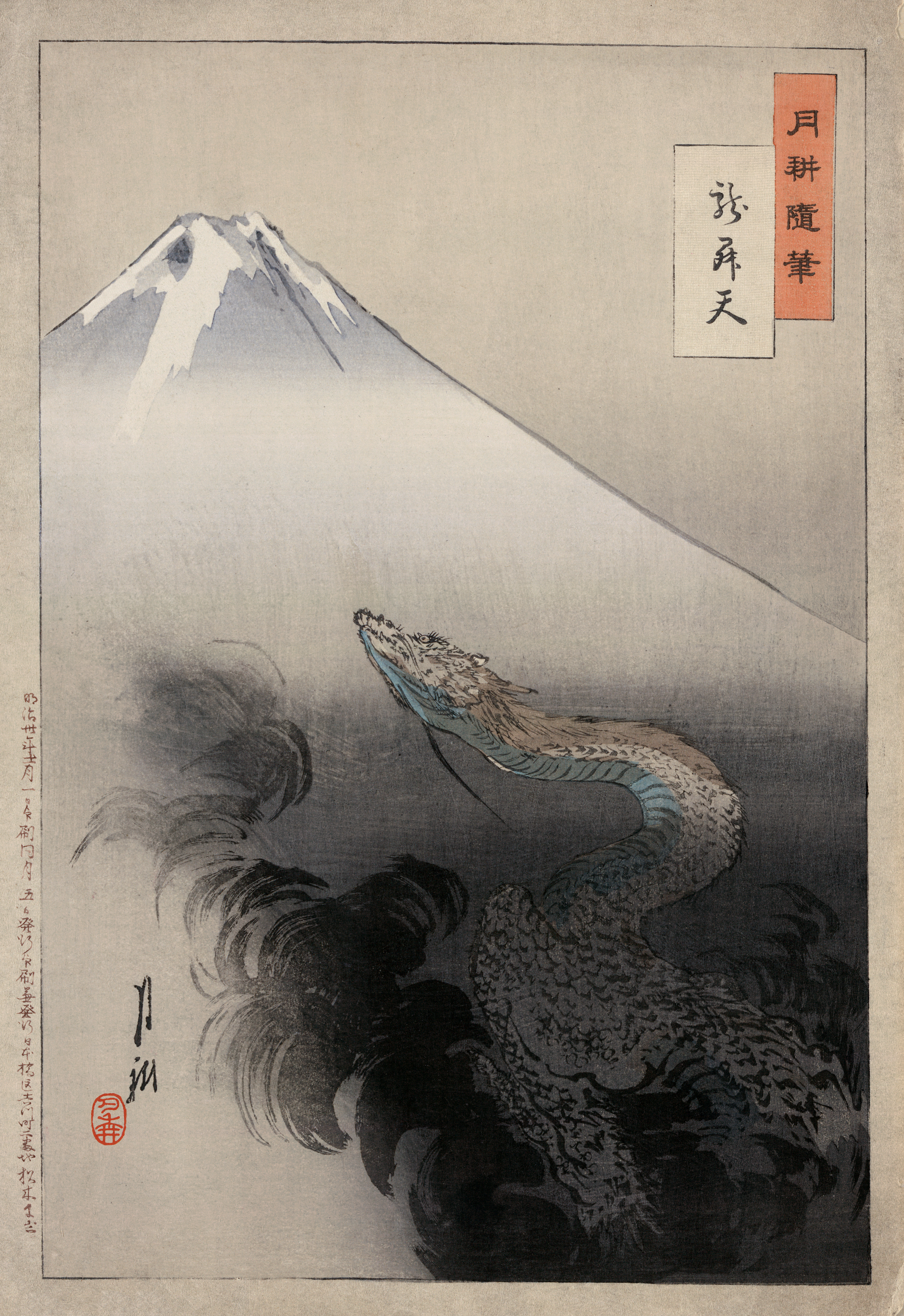
A dragon ascends towards the heavens with Mount Fuji in the background in this 1897 ukiyo-e print from Ogata Gekkō's Views of Mount Fuji.

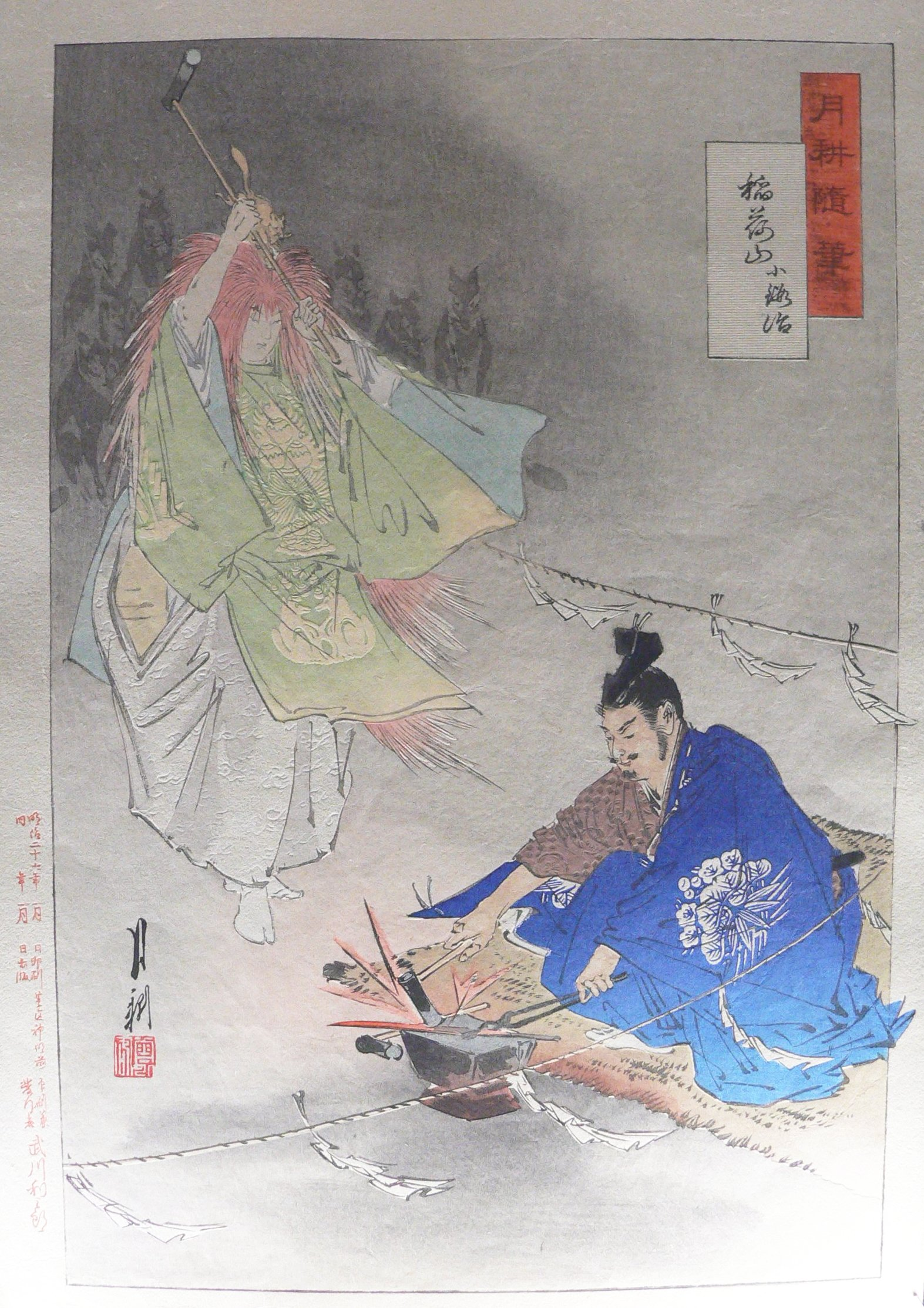
The swordsmith Munechika being aided by a kitsune fox spirit, in a print by Gekkō.

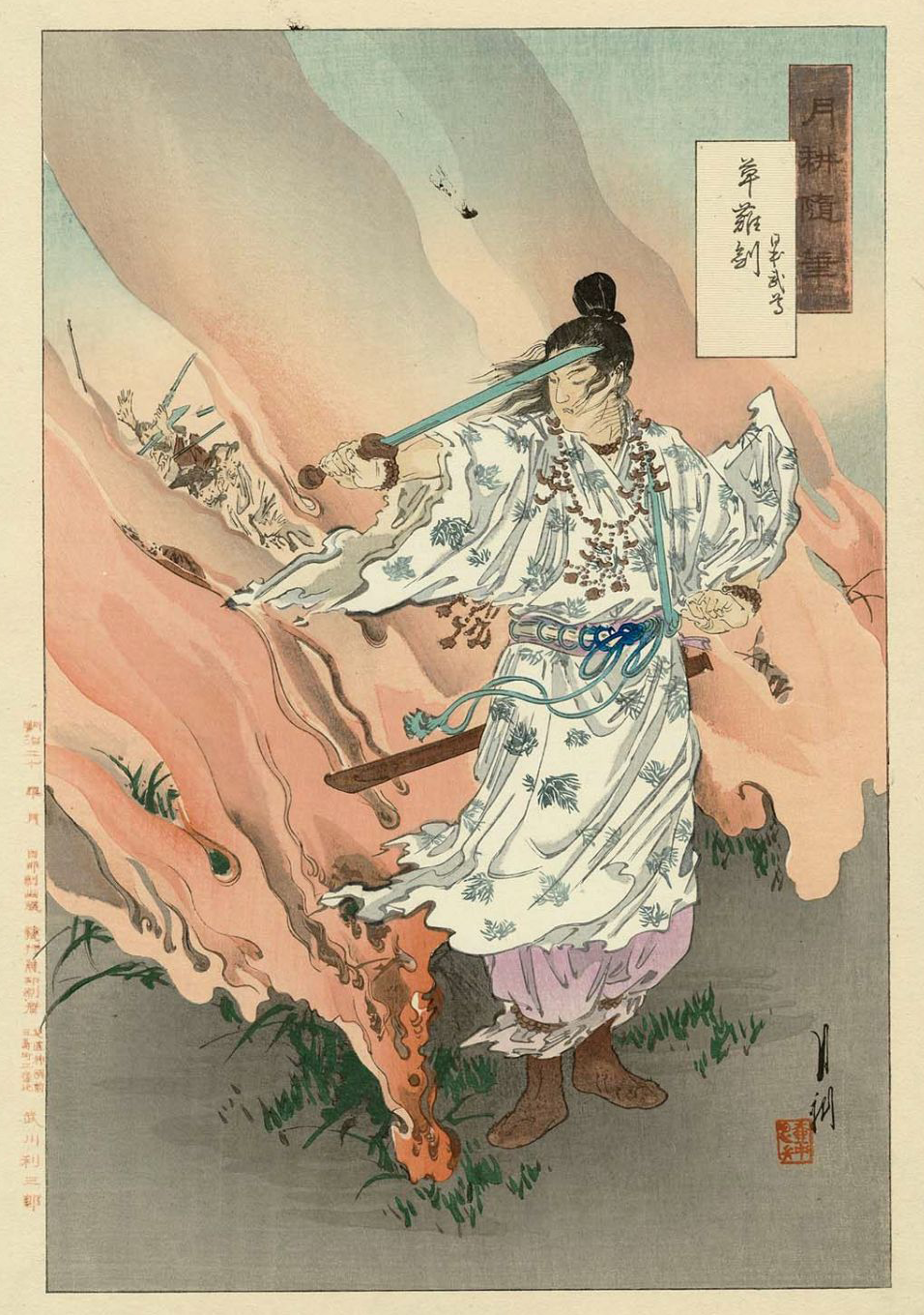
Prince Yamato Takeru and his sword Kusanagi no Tsurugi.

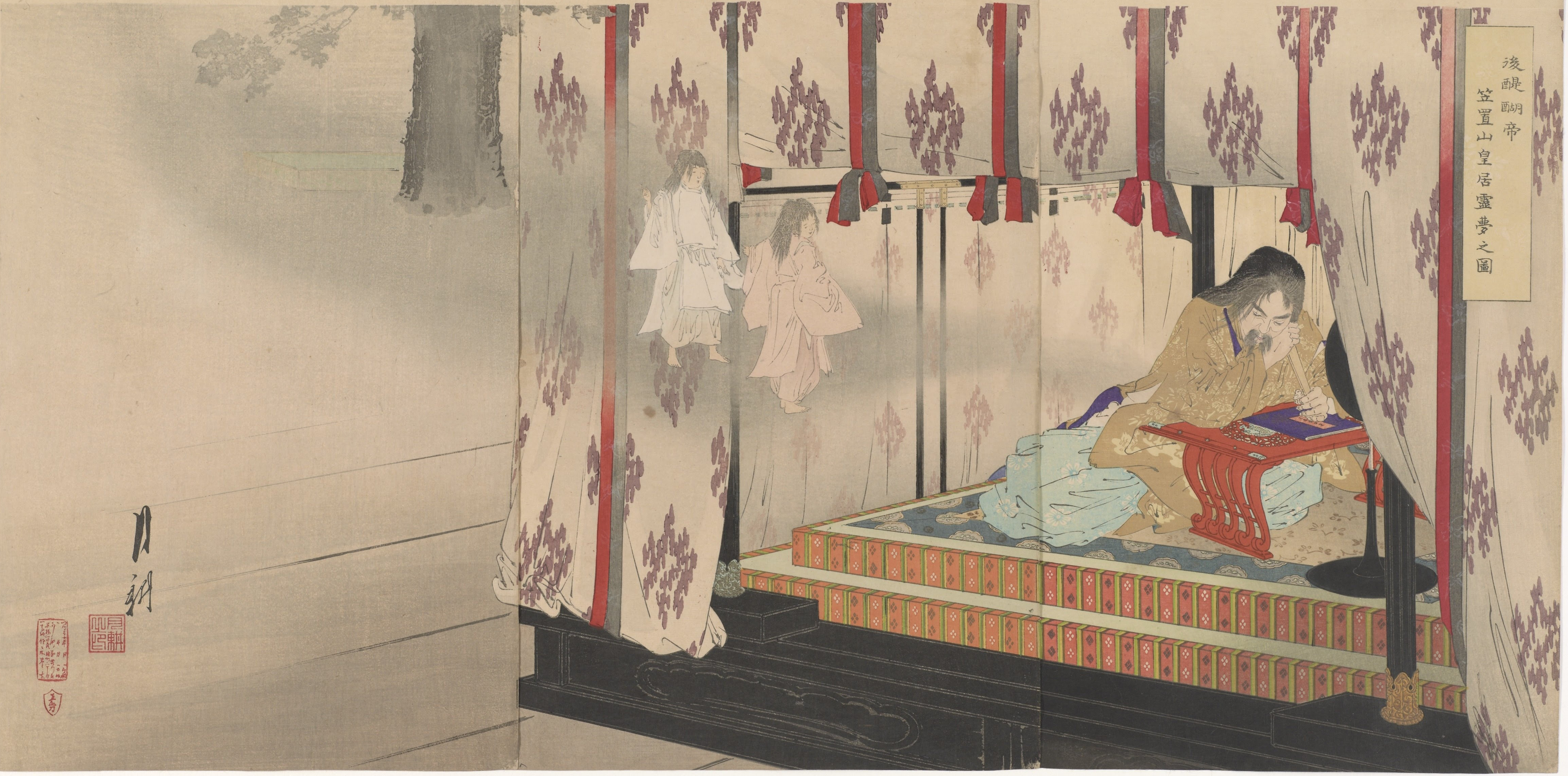
Emperor Go-Daigo, dreams of ghosts at his palace in Kasagiyama.

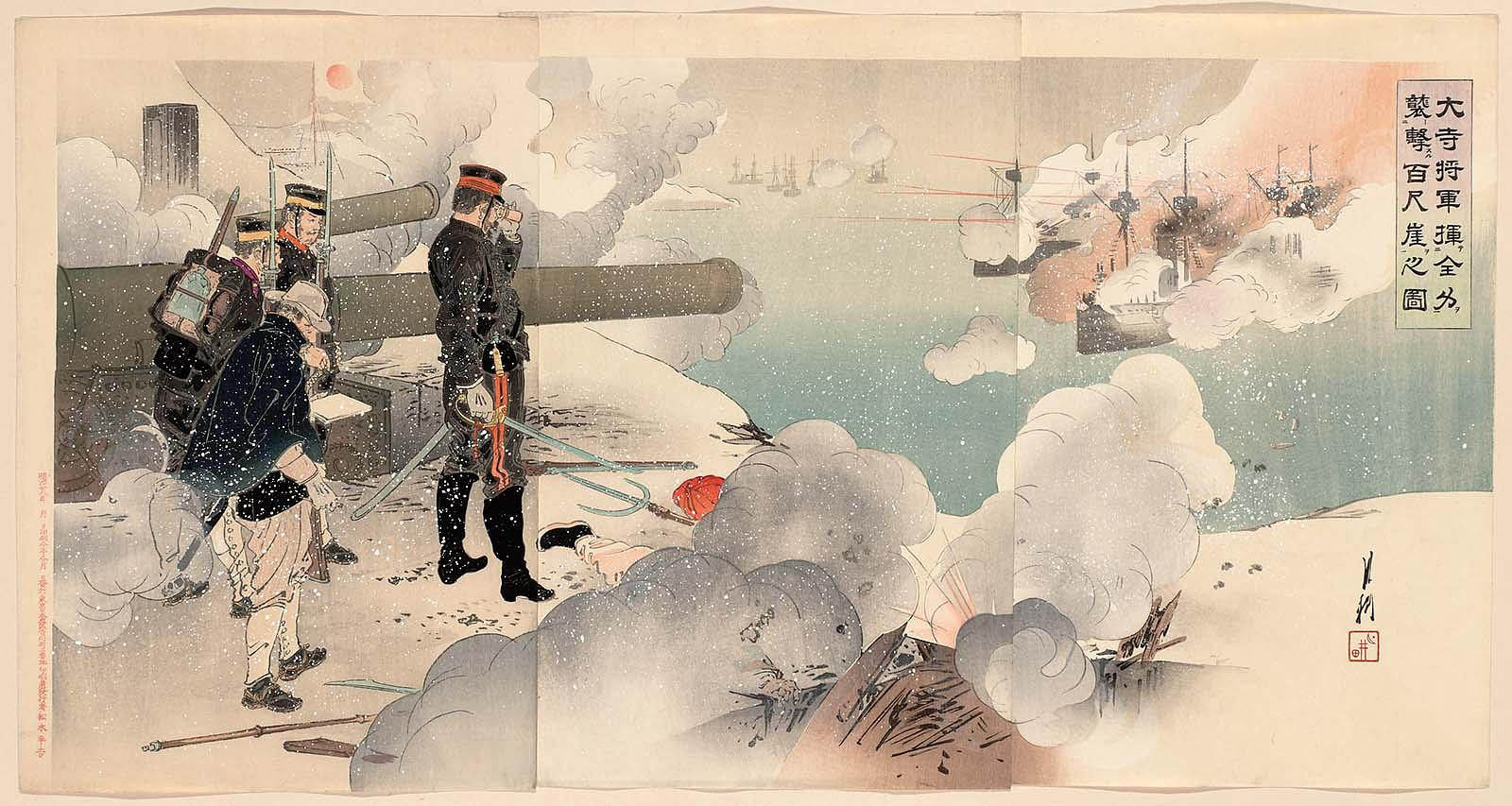
Japanese troops and General Ōdera Yasuzumi Attacking the Hundred Foot Cliff with All His Might during the 1895 Battle of Weihaiwei

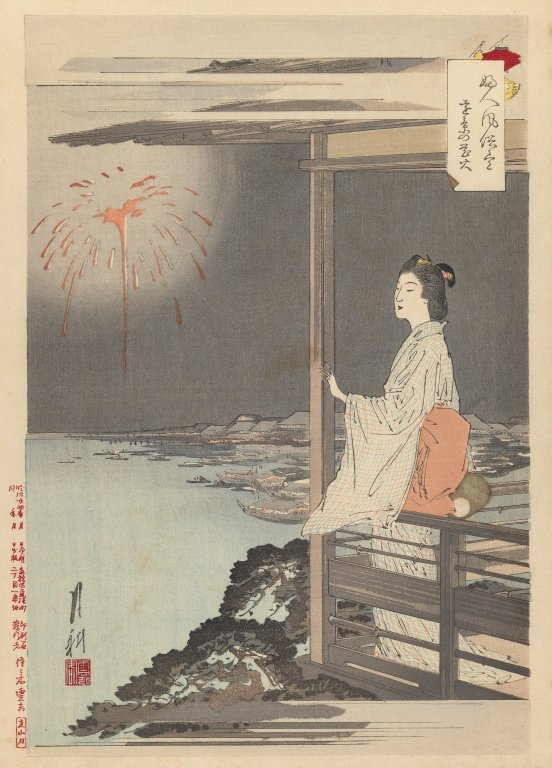
Woman's Customs and Manners

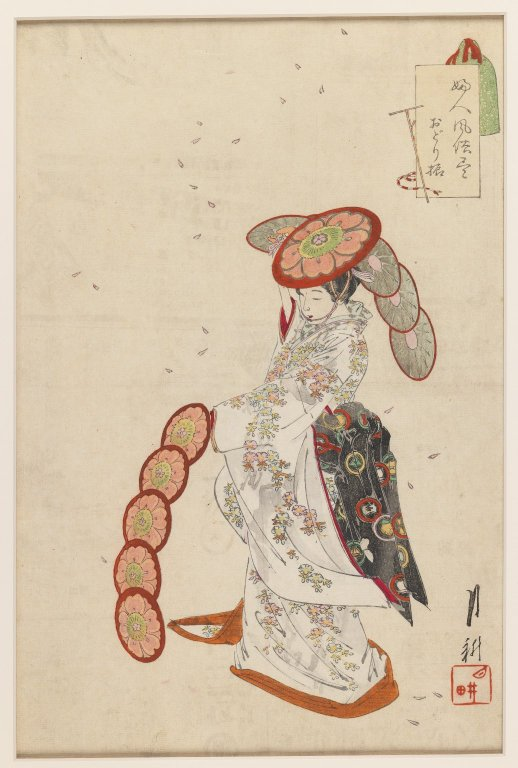
Odori Dancer

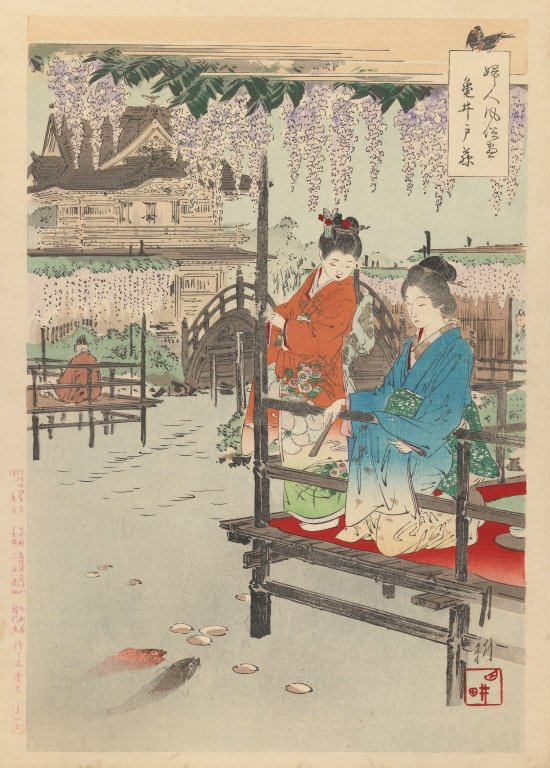
From the series Women's Customs and Manners

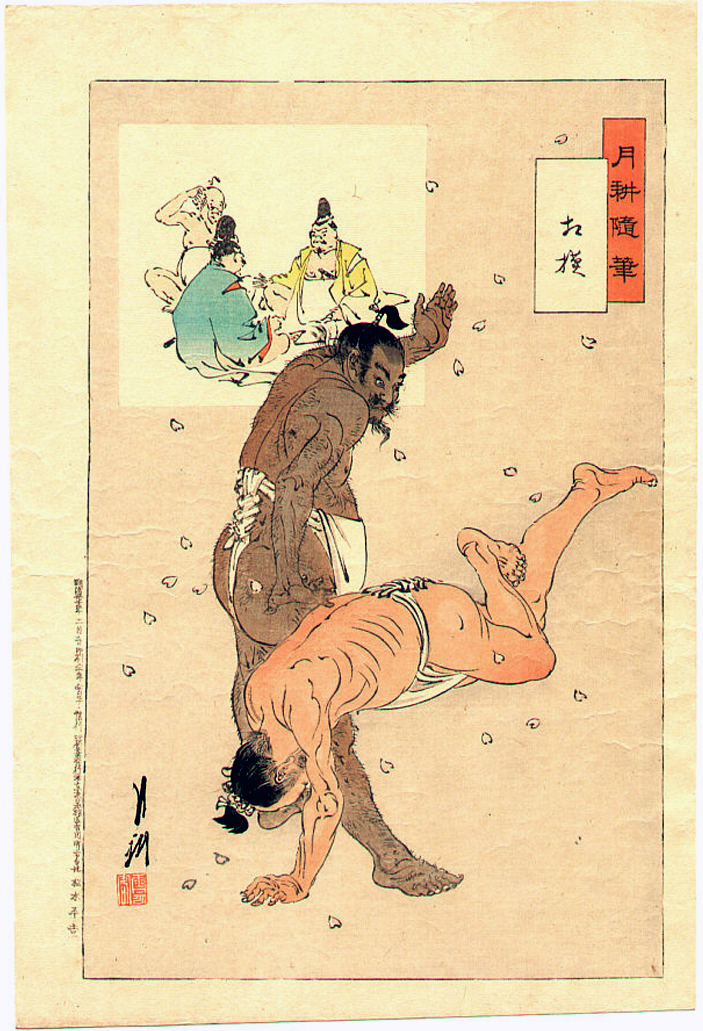
Sumo wrestlers, 1899

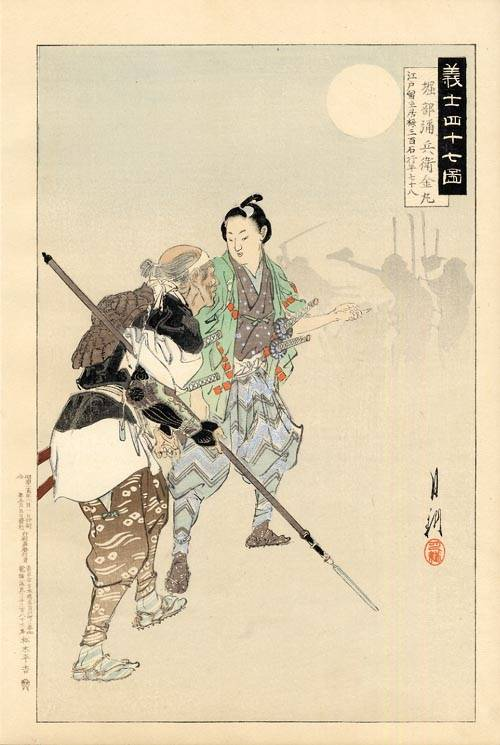
Horibe Yahei Kanamura, ukiyo-e about the Forty-seven rōnin

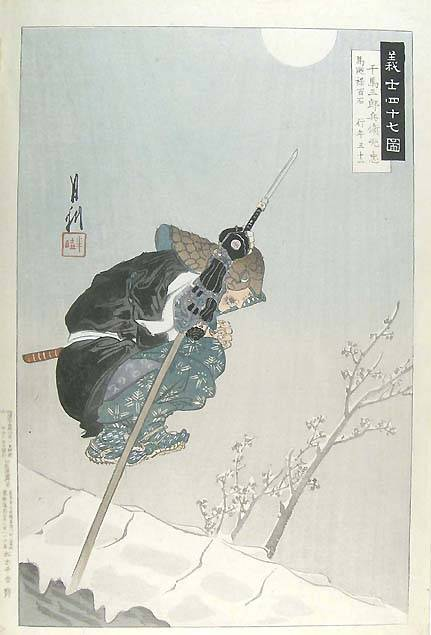
Senba Saburobe Mitsutada, ukiyo-e about the Forty-seven rōnin

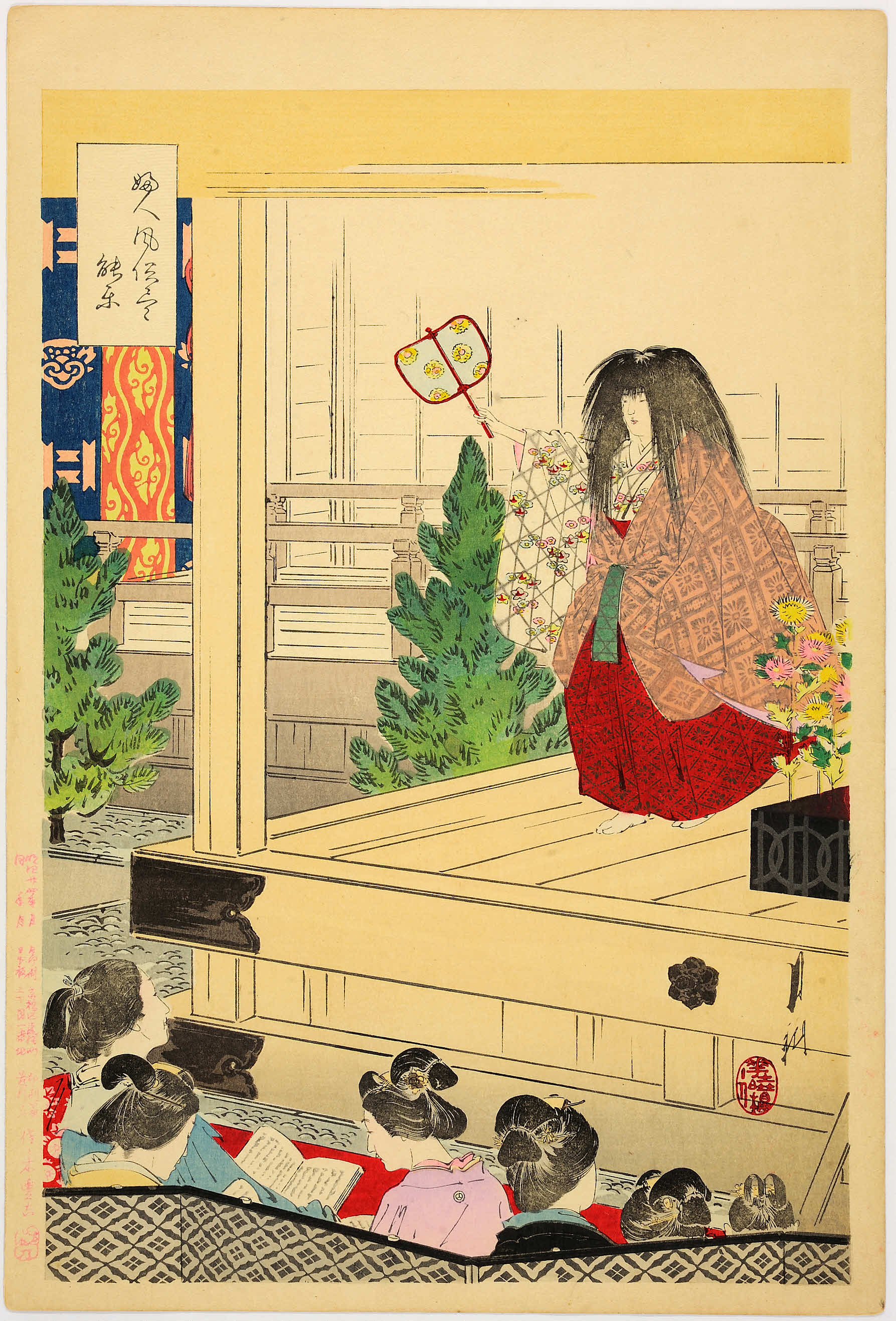
Nogaku, in the Noh theatre, 1891

== See also ==
- War artist
