= Evening on Karl Johan =

1892 painting by Edvard Munch

- Aften på Karl Johan (Norwegian)
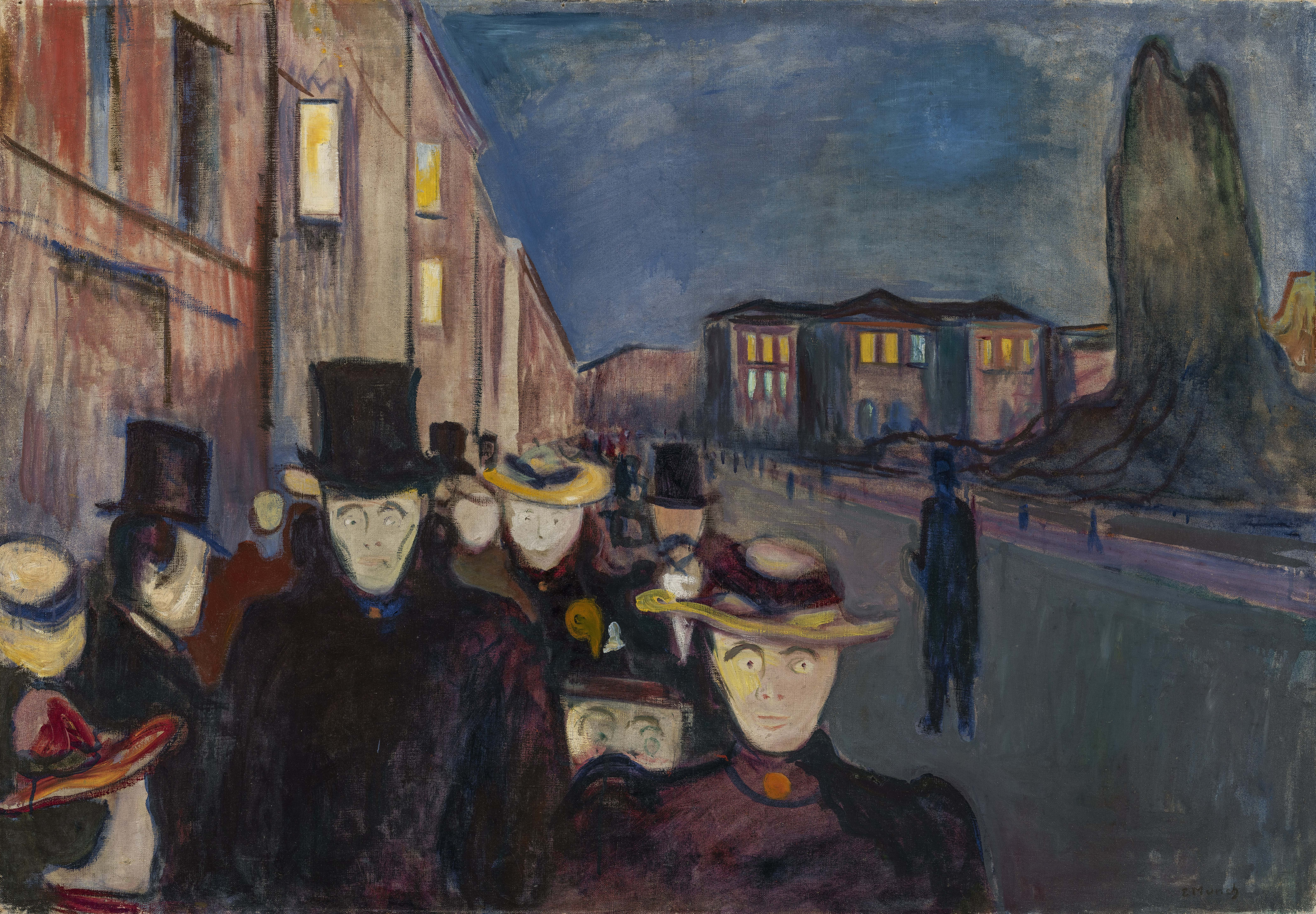
- Artist: Edvard Munch
- Year: 1892
- Medium: Oil on canvas
- Dimensions: 84.5 cm × 121.7 cm (33.3 in × 47.9 in)
- Location: Bergen Kunstmuseum, Bergen

Evening on Karl Johan (Norwegian: Aften på Karl Johan) is a painting by the Norwegian artist Edvard Munch from 1892. It shows a crowd of people walking towards the viewer on Karl Johans Gate in Kristiania, present-day Oslo, and is one of the earliest works of Munch's Frieze of Life.

== Description ==
The image shows Karl Johans Gate, Kristiania's main boulevard, at night. On the right in the background are the Storting Building and two towering poplar trees; on the left is a row of houses with illuminated windows. On this side of the street, a tightly packed crowd approaches the viewer. The men mostly wear top hats, the women light straw hats with ribbons. Their faces are expressionless, frozen into grimaces, their eyes wide open. The bright yellow and green of their faces contrasts with the blue-red sky. On the right side of the street, a single black shadow walks in the opposite direction.

== Interpretation ==
According to Franziska Müller, the perspective in the work evokes a feeling of menace. The viewer faces the crowds in the painting so directly that it is as if they were looking into an abyss or their own reflection. Anni Carlsson sees fear, horror, and hostility in the faces of the crowds rushing headlong toward each other. Only one individual is walking against the flow. Reinhold Heller recognizes a "threat to the individual from the advancing anonymous crowds", Nic. Stang the "dead faces of the petty bourgeoisie". Carlsson interprets the picture as "the artist's confrontation with the group specter of the bourgeoisie", Müller as a juxtaposition of "crowds" and the individual, with the single figure excluded from the crowd being a likeness of Munch.

Evening on Karl Johan is a direct counterpart to the earlier Spring Day on Karl Johan from 1890, which was still painted entirely in the Impressionist style. It shows the street in the opposite direction and in a darker evening atmosphere. The single figure walking in the direction of the picture echoes the rear view from the spring picture. For Jean Selz, Evening on Karl Johan heralds a new expressionist style in Munch's work, in which excitement or shock is captured without revealing the background of the event to the viewer. In this sense, the painting is a direct precursor to Munch's most famous work, The Scream, the first version of which was created the following year. In contrast to this, however, the fear on the faces of the people is not shouted out, but remains "silent and therefore all the more terrifying". A synthesis of the mask-like faces in Evening on Karl Johan and the surroundings and perspective of The Scream is the painting Anxiety from 1894.

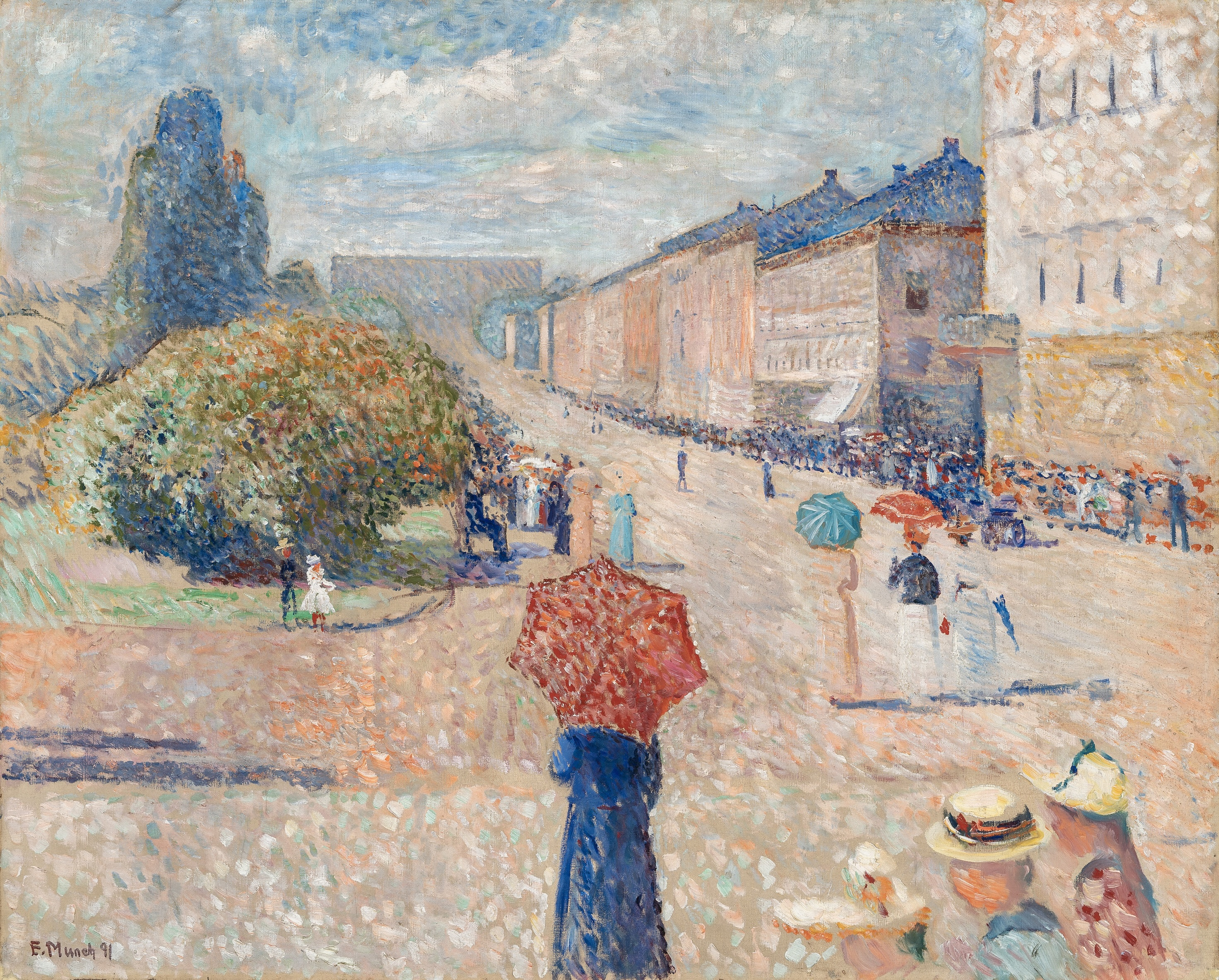
Spring Day on Karl Johan (1890), Oil on canvas, 80 x 100 cm, Kunstmuseum Bergen

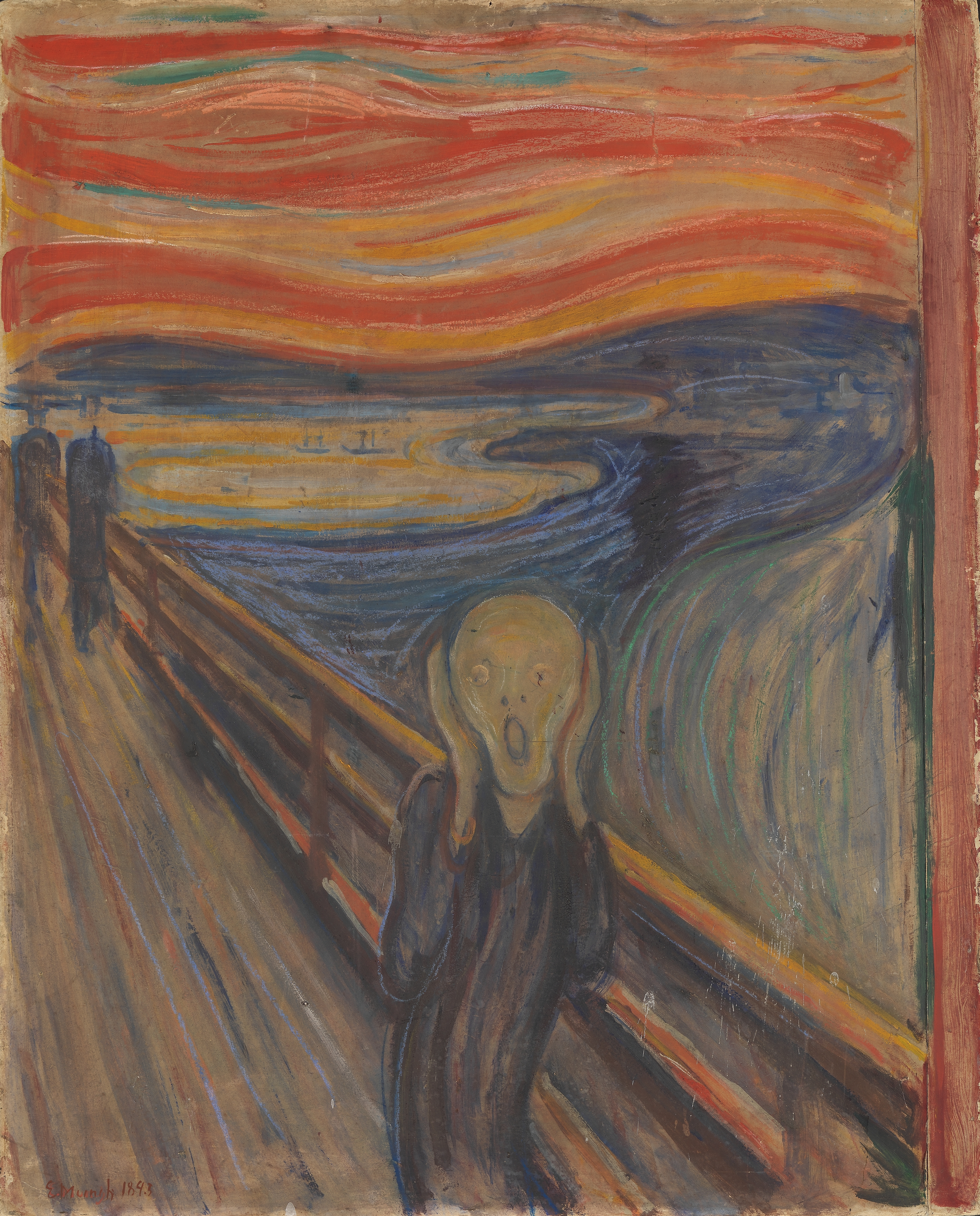
The Scream (1893), Oil, tempera, and pastel on cardboard, 91 × 73.5 cm, National Museum of Norway Oslo

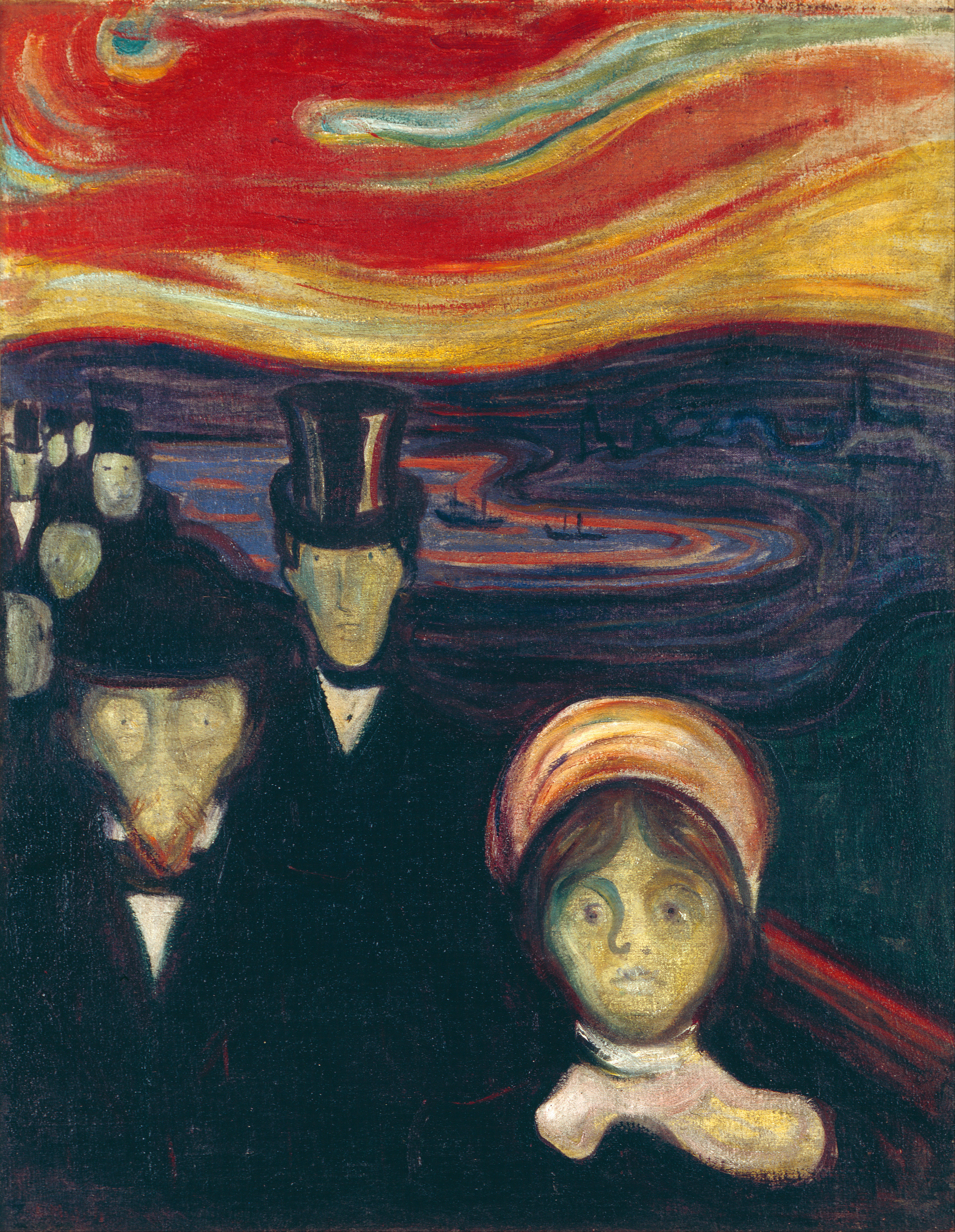
Anxiety (1894), Oil on canvas, 94 x 74 cm, Munch Museum Oslo

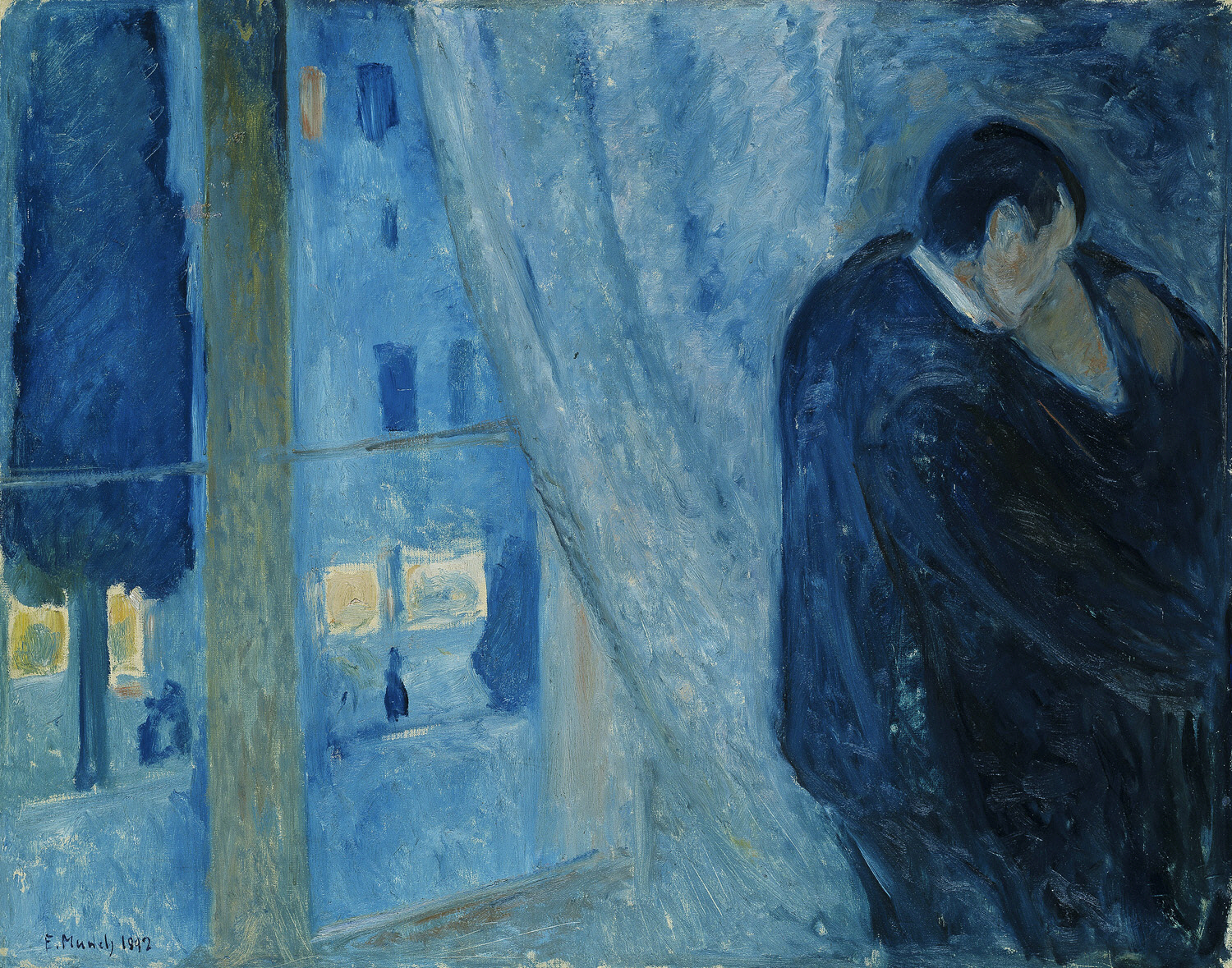
Kiss by the Window (1892), Oil on canvas, 73 x 92 cm, National Museum of Norway Oslo

Arne Eggum likens the suggestive tree formation towering into the sky in Evening on Karl Johan, which is also found in Kiss by the Window from the same year, to Arnold Böcklin's Isle of the Dead. He attributes the mask-like pale faces of the passers-by to the mask motif of the Belgian painter James Ensor, whom Munch may have met on an earlier trip to Brussels. Müller explicitly refers to Ensor's most famous work, Christ's Entry Into Brussels in 1889 (1888/89), in which a crowd of citizens reacts in a similarly dismissive and hostile manner. However, a comparison with Henrik Ibsen's dramas and the contours in Paul Gauguin's paintings also springs to mind. Eberhard Roters compares the painting with Ernst Ludwig Kirchner's street scenes, in which "instead of the expression of fear and melancholy" in Munch, "the stimulating effect of excitement and nervous vitality" has taken its place. Matthias Arnold sees a kinship between Munch's "visions of fear" and those of Goya or Kafka.

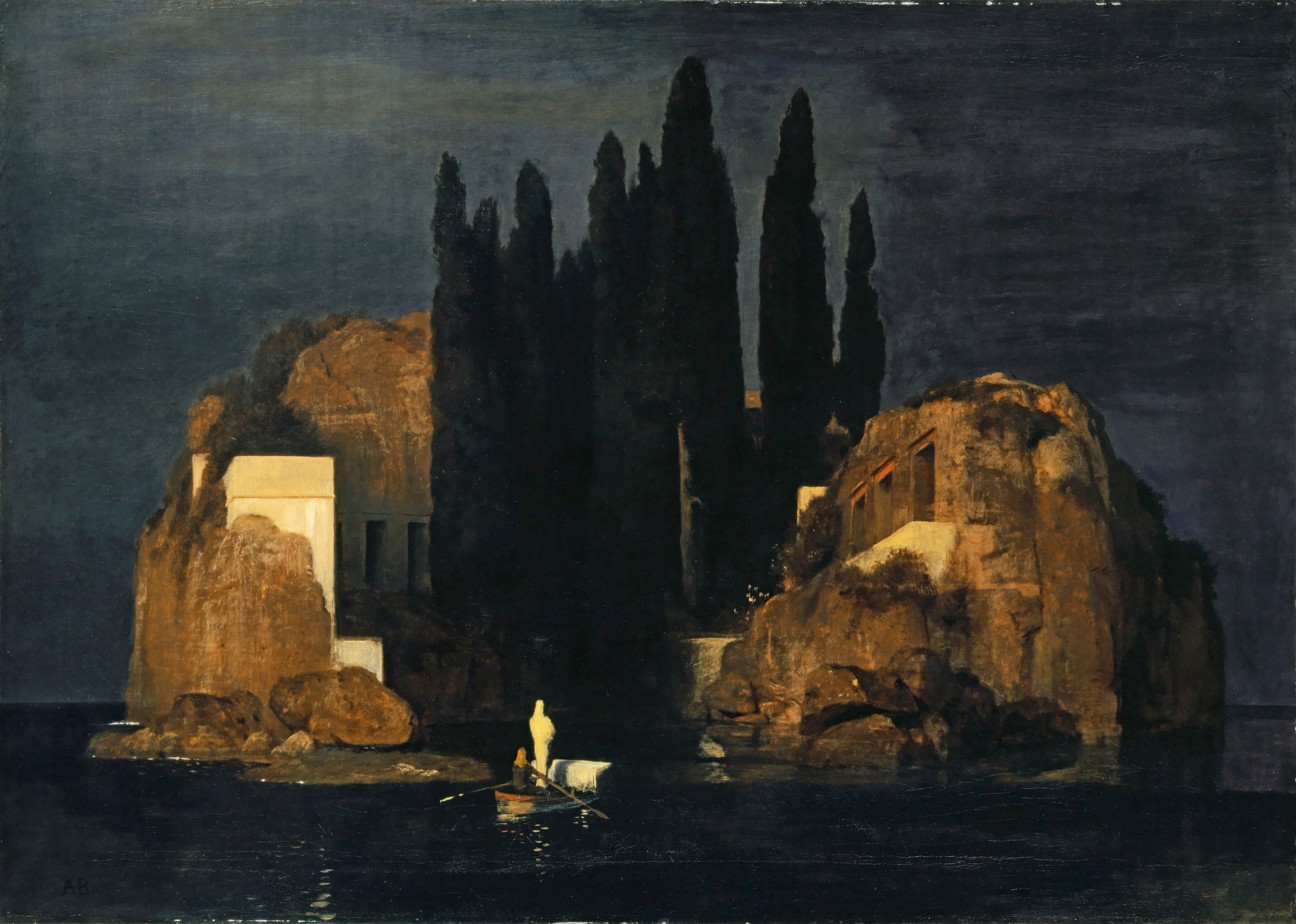
Arnold Böcklin: Isle of the Dead (1880), Oil on canvas, 111 x 155 cm, Kunstmuseum Basel

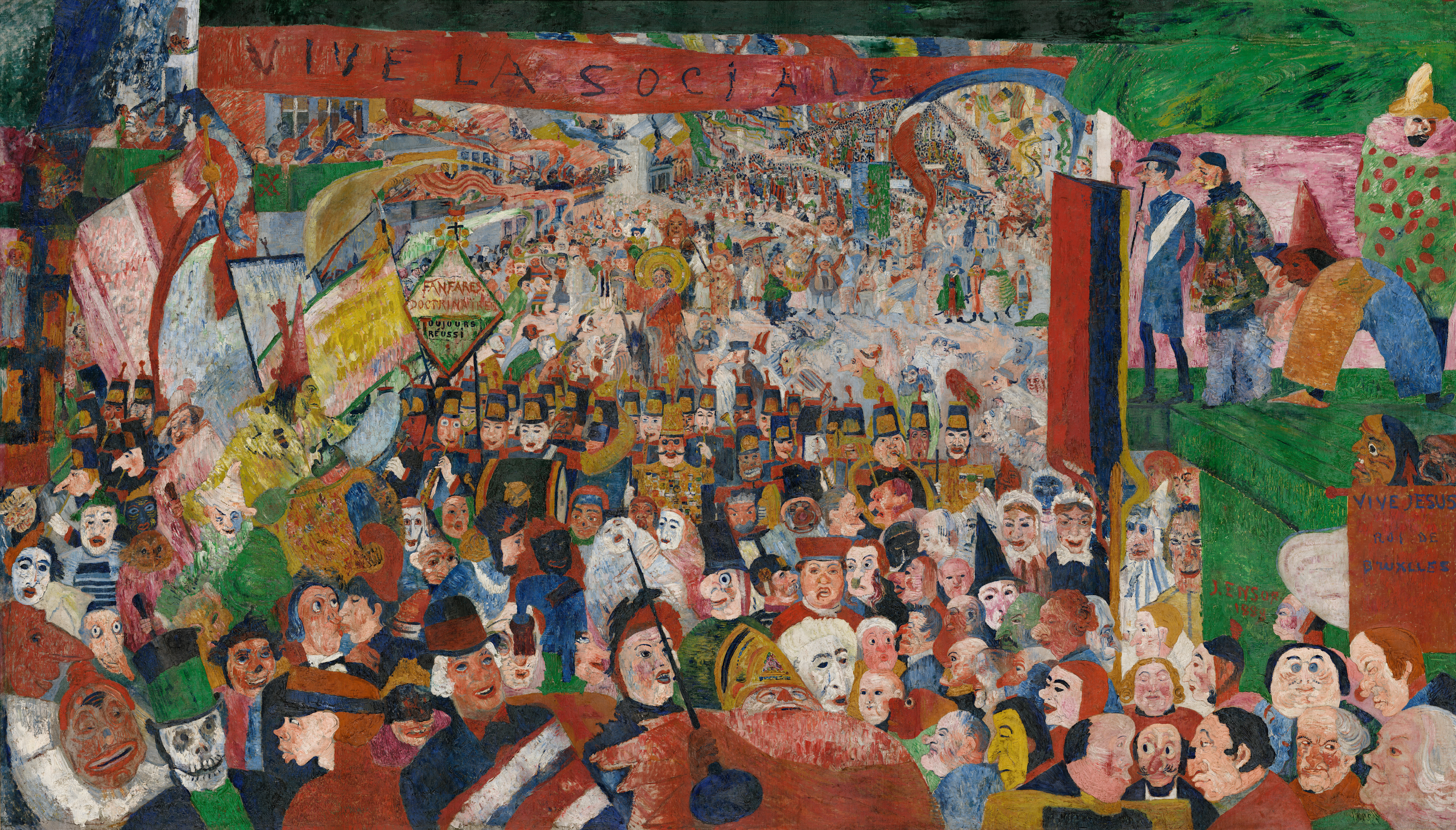
James Ensor: Christ's Entry Into Brussels in 1889 (1888/89), Oil on canvas, 253 x 431 cm, J. Paul Getty Museum Los Angeles

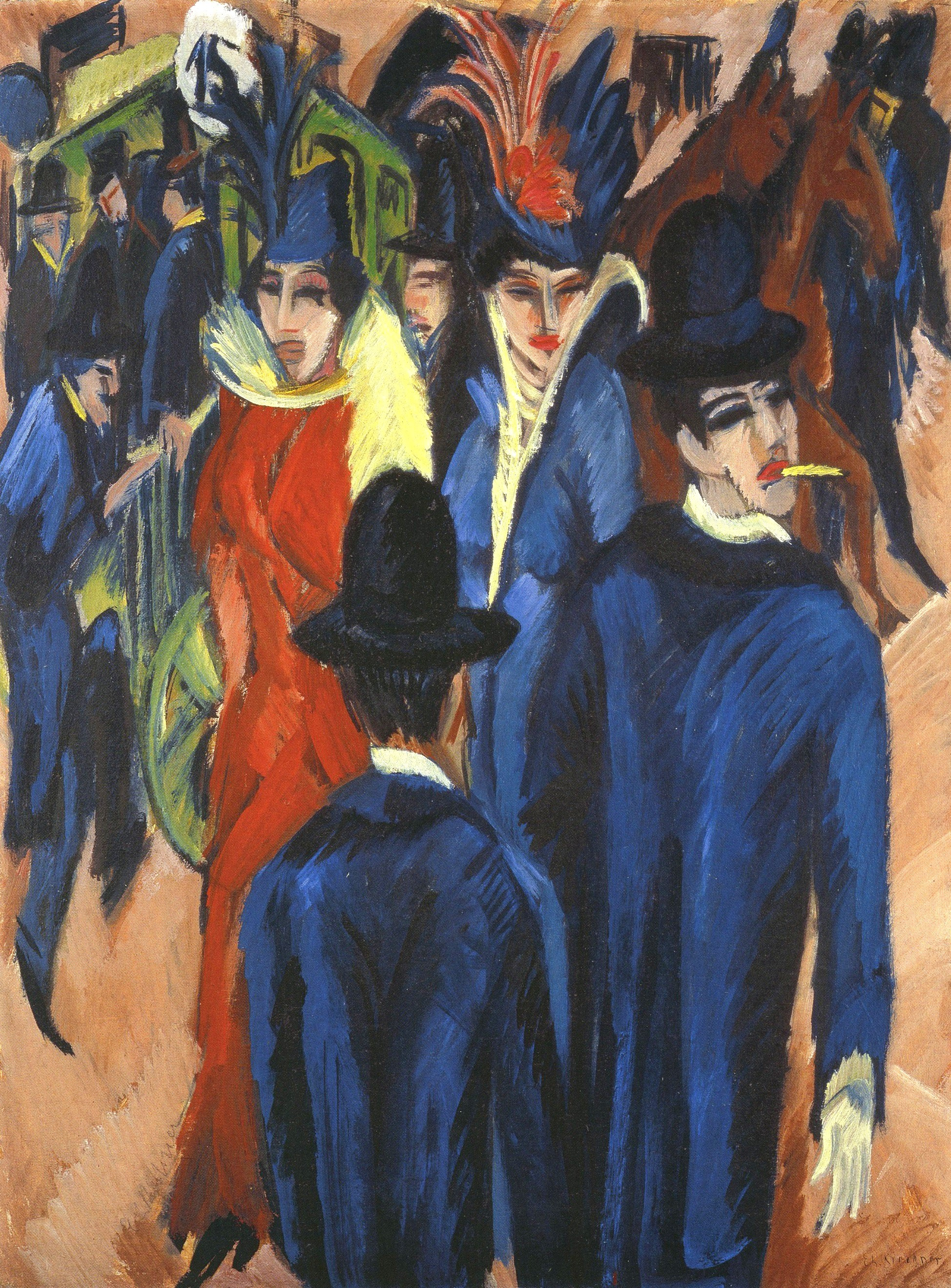
Ernst Ludwig Kirchner: Berlin Street Scene (1913), Oil on canvas, 121 x 95 cm, Neue Galerie New York

== History ==
The first notes hinting at the motif of Evening on Karl Johan can be found in Munch's literary diary from 1889. In his notes, he described his own experience: "Everyone—people passing by—looked so strange and peculiar, and it seemed to him that they were looking at him—staring at him—all these faces—glances in the evening light – He tried to hold on to a thought, but couldn't – he felt a complete emptiness in his head – then he tried to fix his gaze on a window high above – then the passers-by disturbed him again – His whole body was shaking and sweat was running down his face". A similar experience from his time in Paris has been recorded: "I was out again on the blue Boulevard des Italiens with the thousand strange faces that looked so ghostly in the electric light –".

Munch spent the summer of 1892, still full of inspiration from his recent trip to Paris, in Kristiania and Åsgårdstrand. Arne Eggum refers to Evening on Karl Johan as "perhaps the most idiosyncratic painting of that summer". Munch exhibited the painting for the first time in September 1892 at his second special exhibition at Tostrupgården in Kristiania. The magazine Morgenbladet responded with the phrase "a downright insane painting". The public denounced both the painting and the painter as "sick". Munch himself, however, valued the painting so highly that he included it in his Frieze of Life, a collection of his central motifs on life, love, and death. In 1909, Norwegian art collector Rasmus Meyer acquired the painting as part of his collection in Bergen, which was made public in 1924.

== See also ==
- List of paintings by Edvard Munch
