= Anxiety (Munch) =

Painting by Edvard Munch

- Angst (Norwegian)
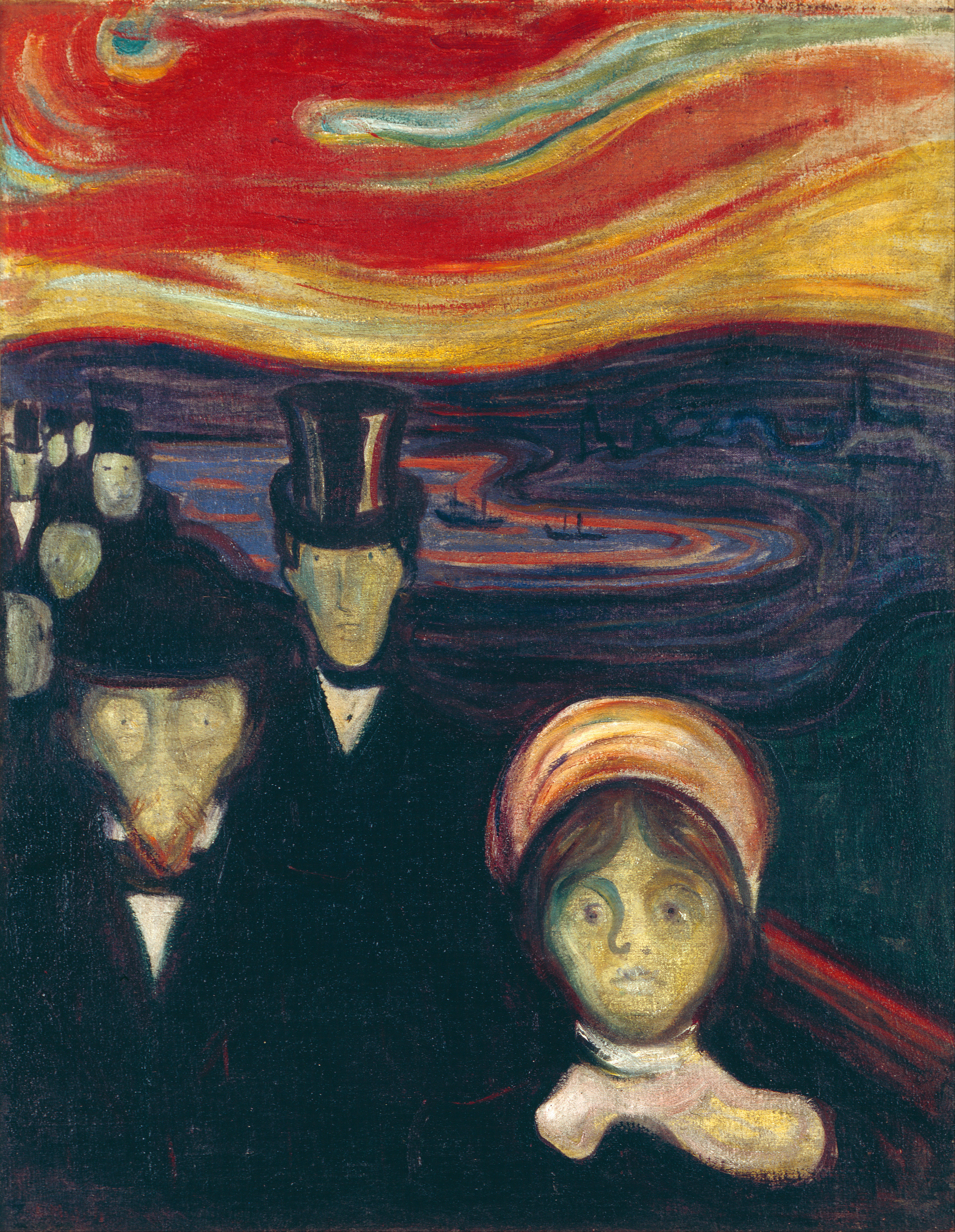
- Artist: Edvard Munch
- Year: 1894
- Medium: Oil on canvas
- Dimensions: 94.0 cm × 74.0 cm (37.0 in × 29.1 in)
- Location: Munch Museum; Oslo

Anxiety (Norwegian: Angst) is an 1894 painting by the Norwegian painter Edvard Munch. It shows a group of people walking towards the viewer under a blood-red sky. The painting is a synthesis of the earlier motifs Evening on Karl Johan (1892) and The Scream (1893). It is part of Munch's Frieze of Life and is exhibited at the Munch Museum. In 1896, Munch created a lithograph and a woodcut based on the motif.

== Description ==
The image borrows the setting from The Scream: a railing cutting diagonally across the picture space with lines falling from the top left to the bottom right, a steep precipice revealing a city and a fjord navigated by ships in the distance, and finally a blood-red sky with stormy cloud formations. On the footbridge or bridge is a group of people with greenish-pale faces and wide-open eyes, staring directly at the viewer and seeming to press toward them. Three figures are particularly prominent in the foreground: a woman wearing a bonnet or halo-like hat, a man wearing a top hat, and another man wearing a hat and a goatee.

According to Gerd Woll, the signal colors and color contrasts have an alarming effect and underscore a feeling of uncertainty and fear that emanates from the composition of the painting. According to Uwe M. Schneede, this can also be attributed to the “turbulent, threatening sky” and the “depth of the landscape”. In the first exhibition as part of the Life Frieze, Munch gave the painting the title Red Clouds.

== Prints ==
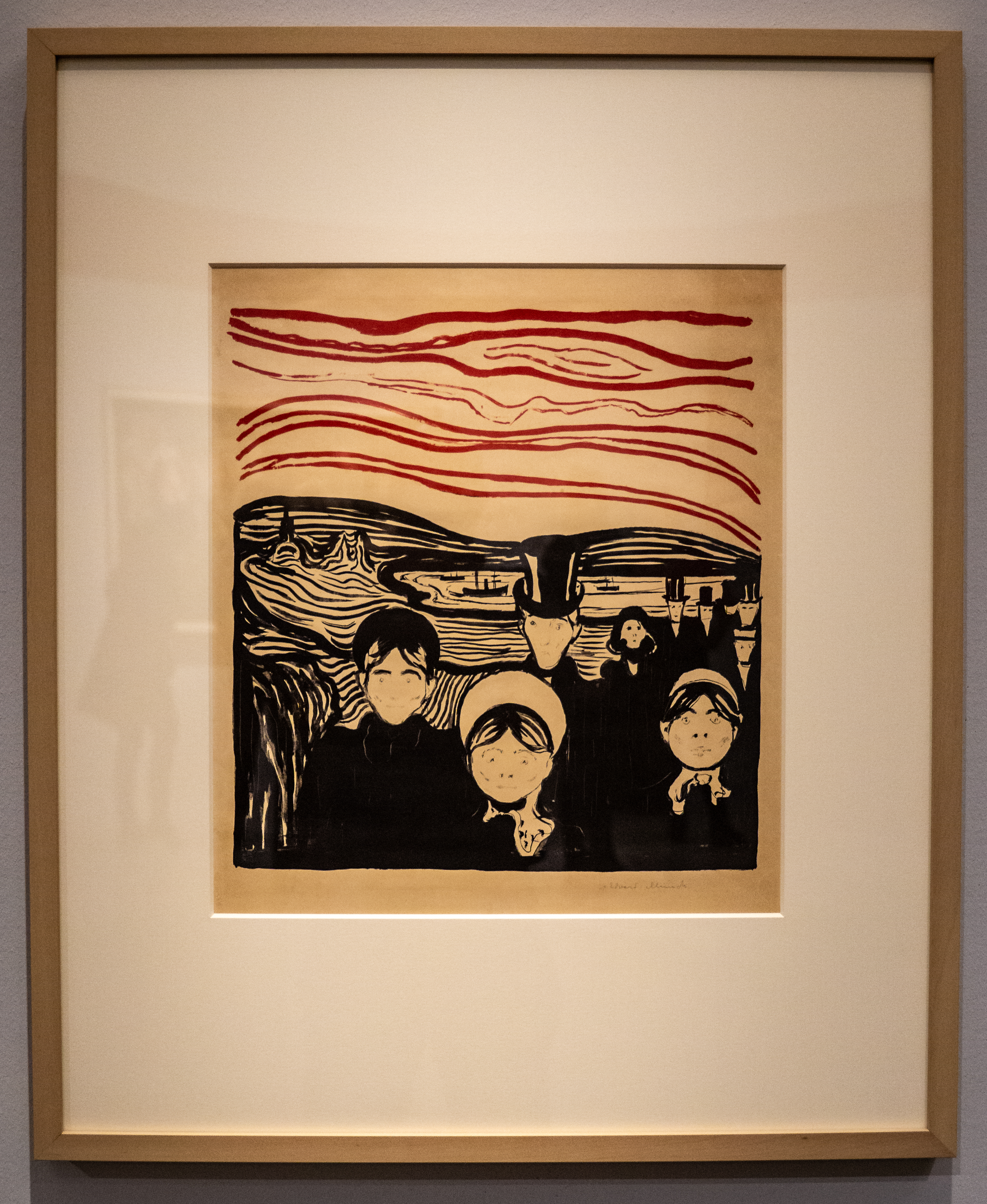
Anxiety, 1896. Lithograph. 41.3 × 38.8 cm. Museum Folkwang, Essen

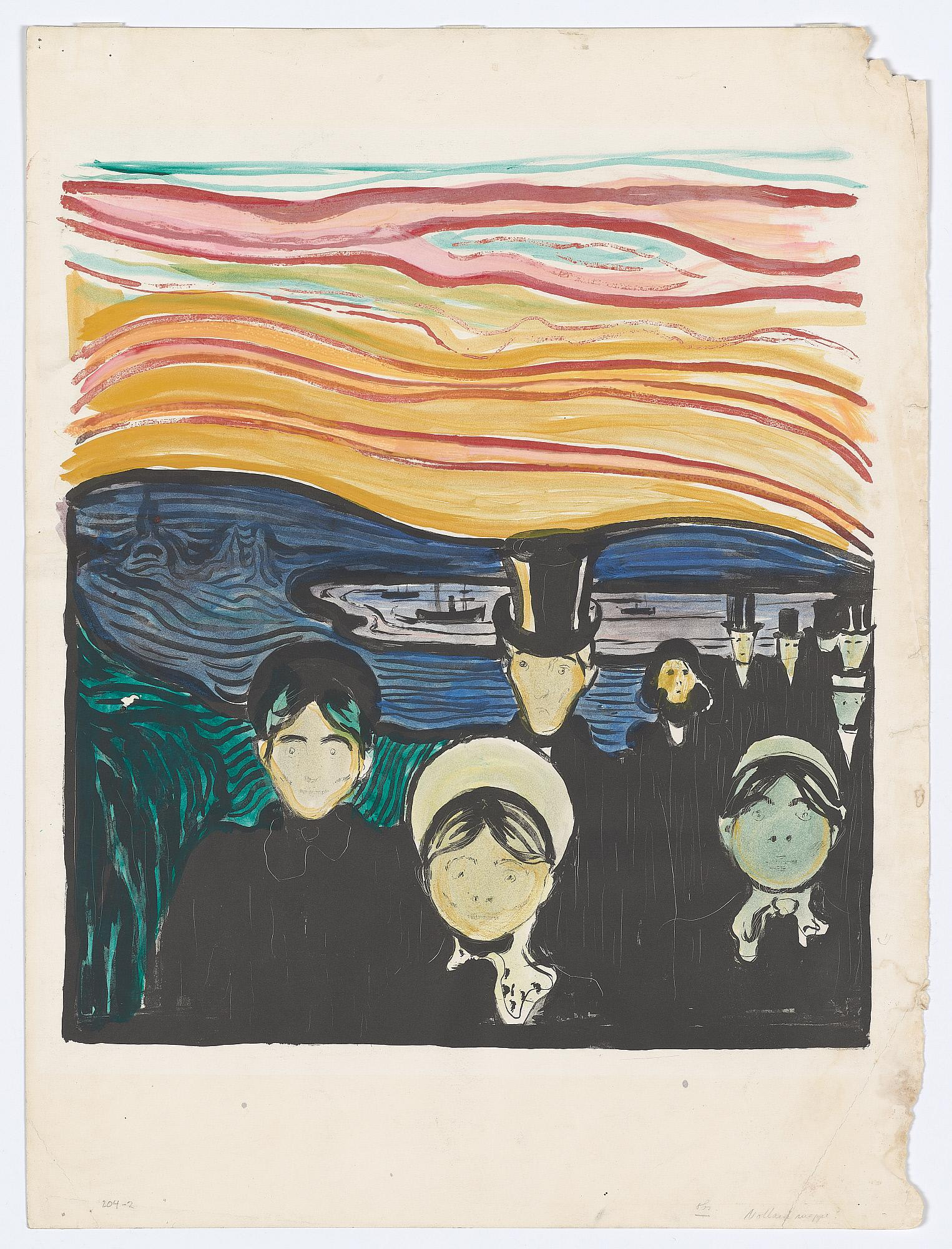
Anxiety, 1896. Hand Colored Lithograph. 42 × 38.6 cm. Munch Museum, Oslo

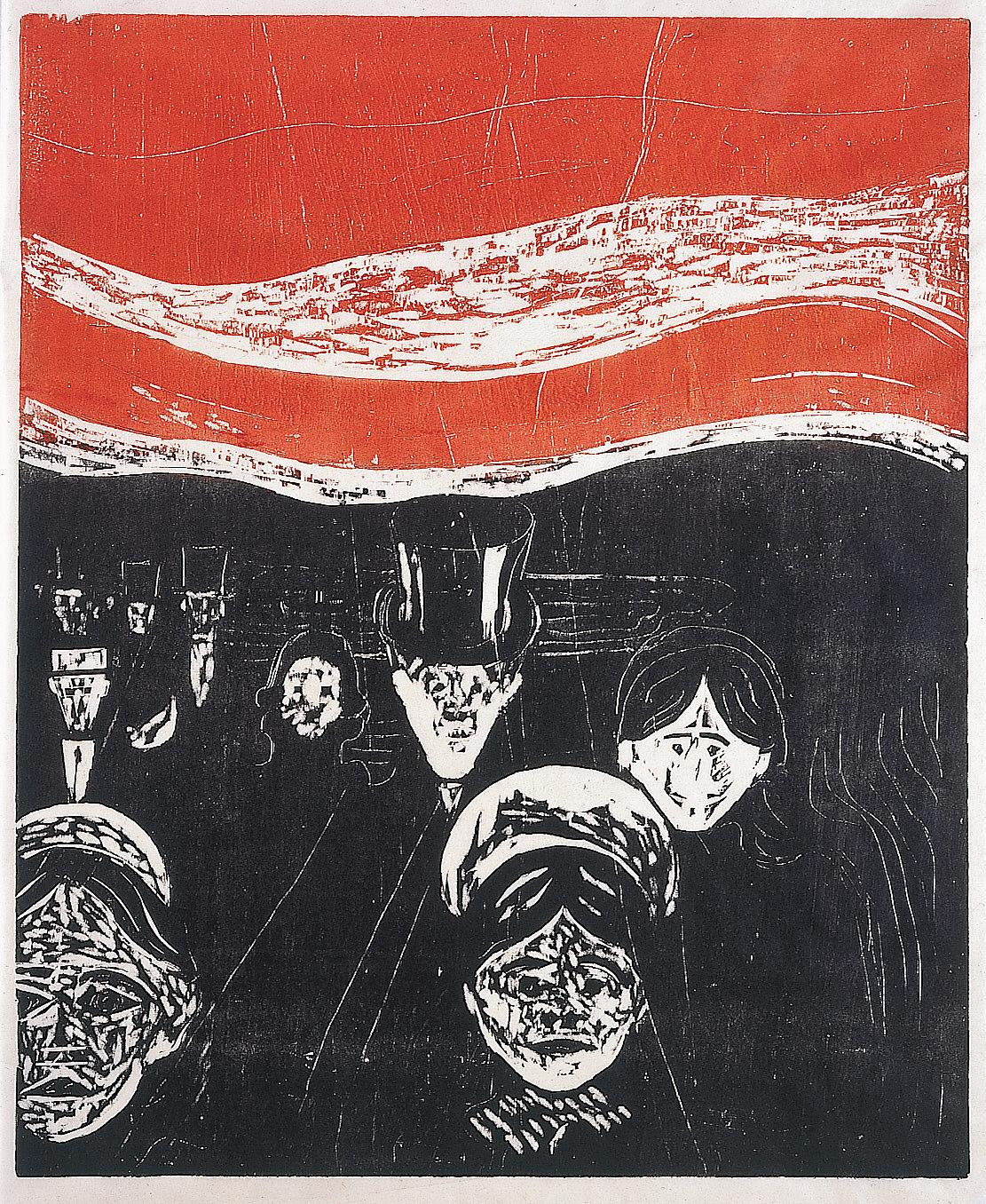
Anxiety ,1896. Woodcut. 45.5 × 37.2 cm. Munch Museum, Oslo

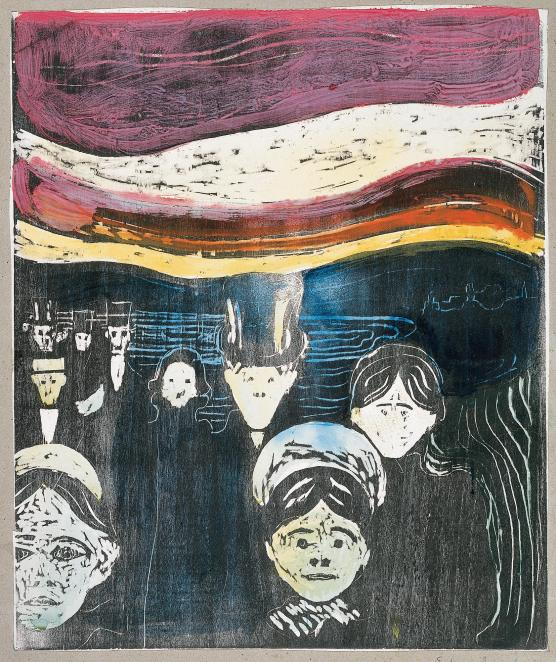
Anxiety, 1896. Hand Colored Woodcut. 46 × 37.5 cm. Munch Museum, Oslo

In 1896, two prints based on the motif Anxiety were created, presumably within a few months of each other: a lithograph, which is mirrored opposite the painting, and a woodcut. In both, the railing that dominated the perspective of the painting has been omitted, and the figures are spread across the entire foreground. Instead of the man with the goatee, there are now three female figures with bonnets grouped around the man with the top hat.

The lithograph has a printing stone that was partially colored in two colors. The broad black lines were applied with lithographic ink, and the clothes merge into a single dense black area. Munch contributed a two-color print in black and red to Ambroise Vollard‘s 1896 compilation Les Peintres-Graveurs. The woodcut also exists as a monochrome print in red or black and as a two-color print. Arne Eggum finds it even more “concentrated and at the same time more unreal” than the lithograph.

== Position in Munch's oeuvre ==
Arne Eggum describes Anxiety as a synthesis of two earlier depictions of feelings of anxiety, namely the paintings Evening on Karl Johan (1892) and Despair (1892) and its further development The Scream (1893). Munch transferred the figures from the first painting, with their fearful, staring faces, to the landscape on the east coast of the Oslo Fjord in the latter painting. Reinhold Heller considers this a far more successful combination than the transfer of the Jappe Nilssen figure from the beach in Melancholy to the bridge in The Scream in the second painting, Despair, which was also created in 1894 but, according to Heller, lacks the intensity of its two predecessors.

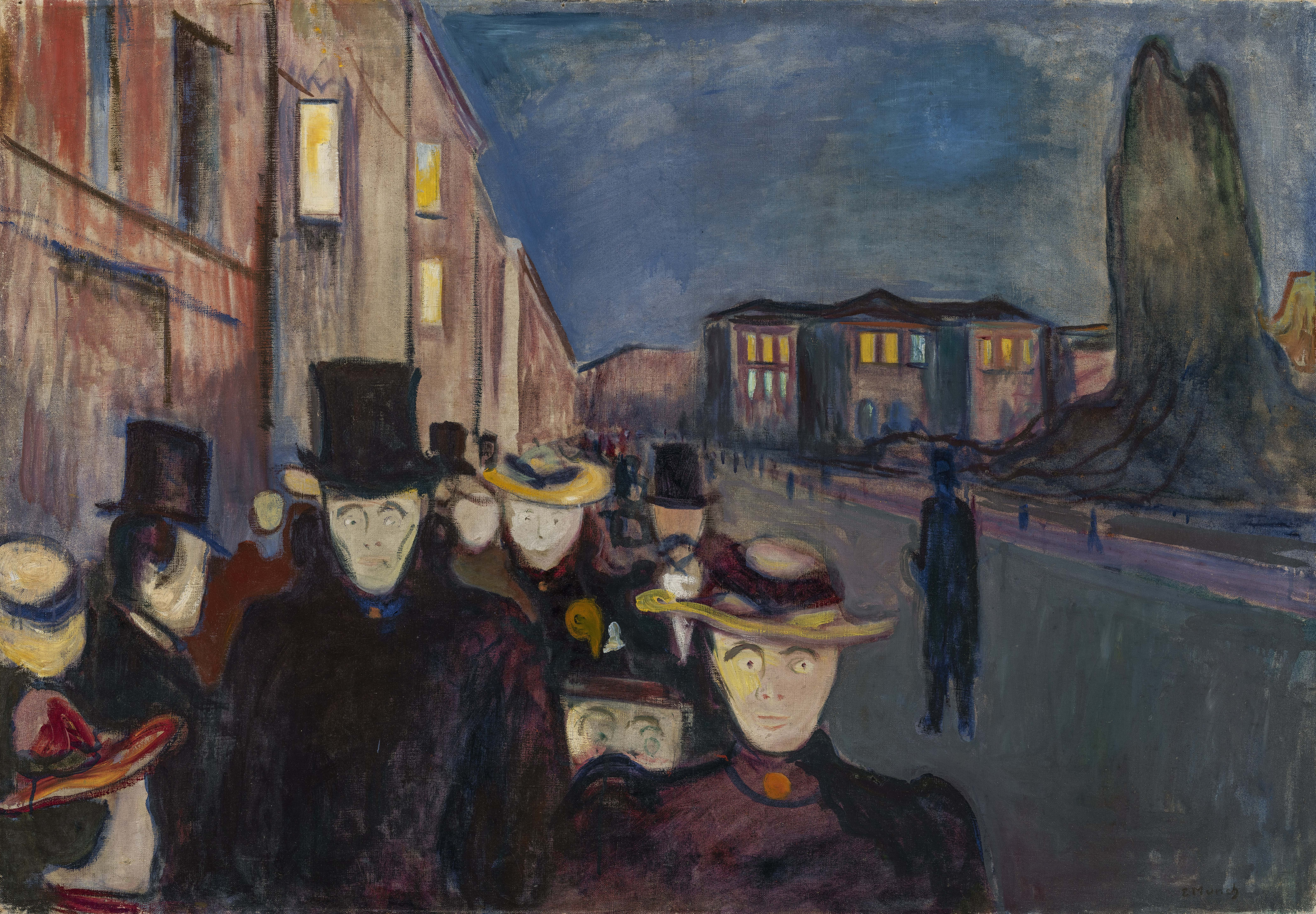
Evening on Karl Johan, 1892. Oil on canvas. 84.5 × 121 cm. Kunstmuseum Bergen

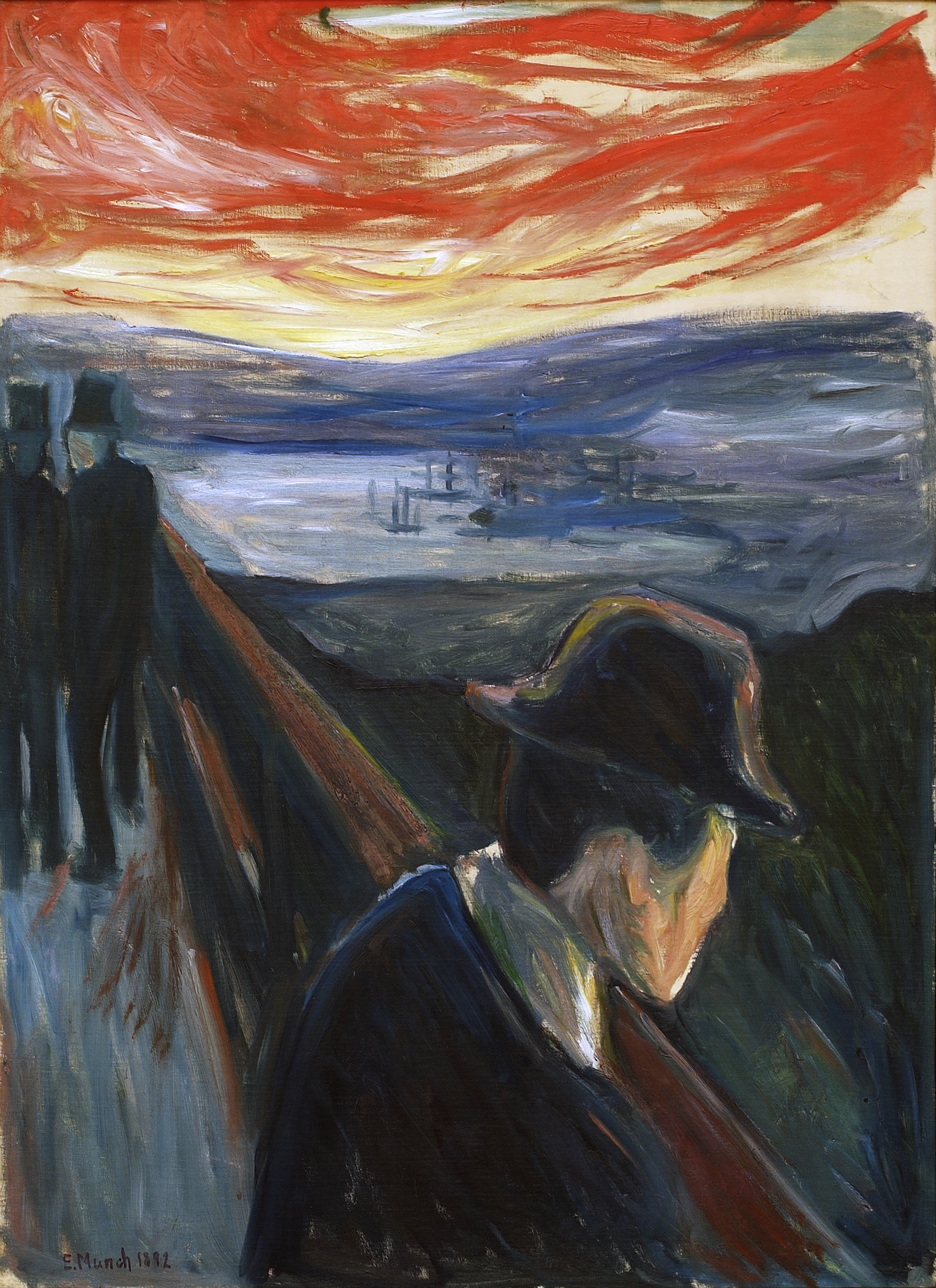
Despair, 1892. Oil on canvas. 92 × 67 cm. Thiel Gallery, Stockholm

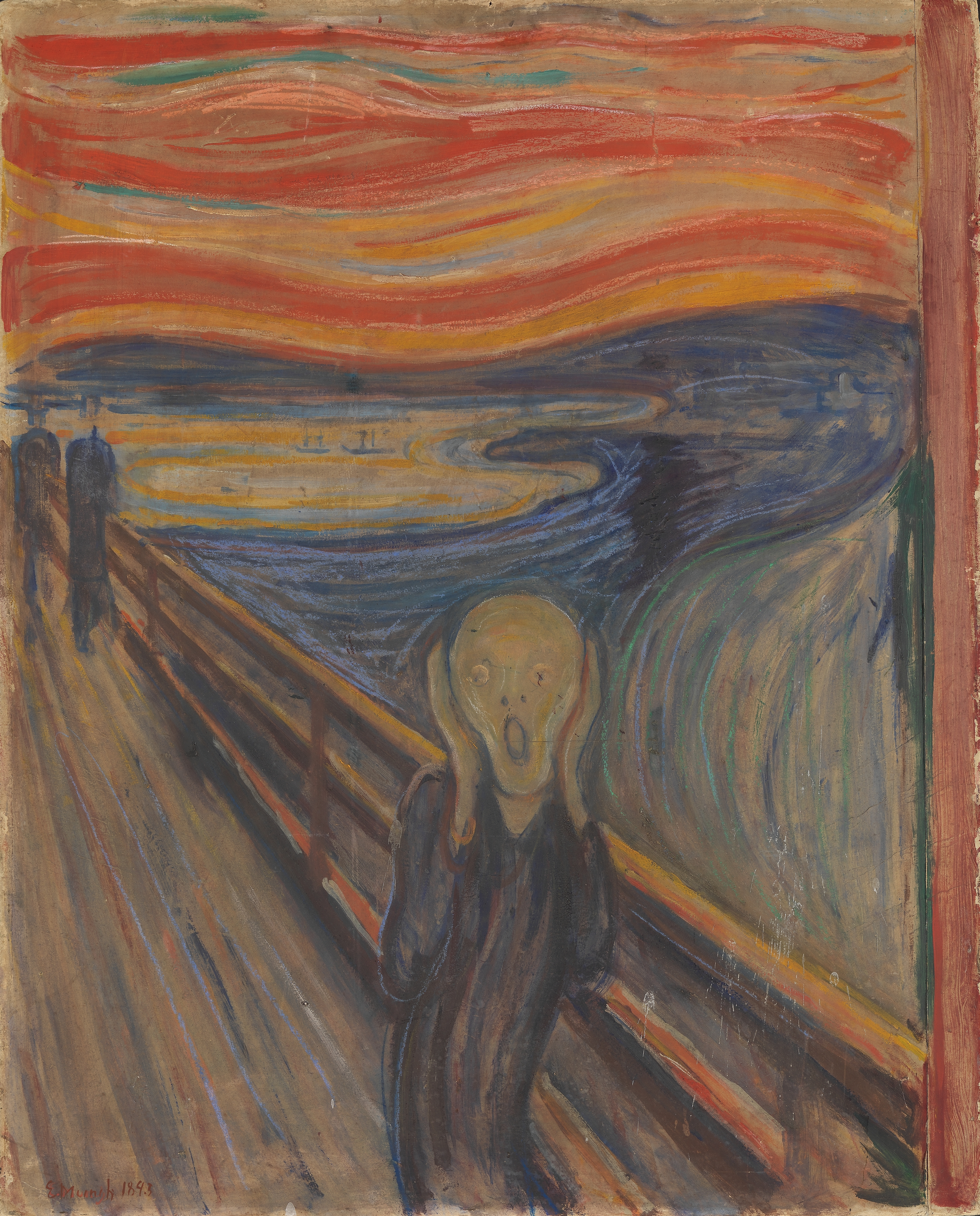
The Scream, 1893. Oil, tempera and pastel on cardboard. 91 × 73.5 cm. National Museum of Norway, Oslo

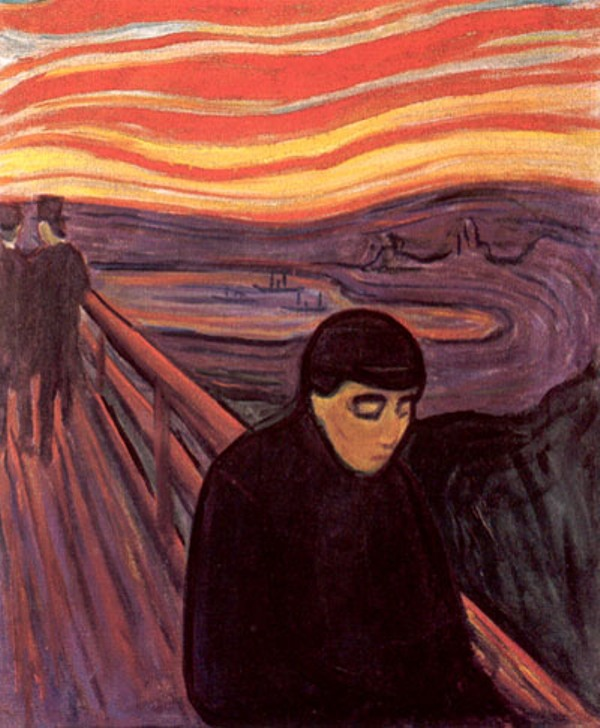
Despair, 1894. Oil on canvas. 92 × 72.5 cm. Munch Museum, Oslo

While most of the figures in Anxiety can be traced back to those in its predecessor, Evening on Karl Johan, the figure with the goatee on the left edge of the painting is new. Eggum sees him as a representation of the Polish writer Stanisław Przybyszewski, whom Munch had met in the artistic bohemian circle around the Berlin restaurant The Black Piglet in Berlin and whom he portrayed several times, including in the Frieze of Life motifs Jealousy and Red Virginia Creeper. Eggum interprets the inclusion in Anxiety as a tribute to the friend who, with his novel Requiem, provided Munch with the formulas for his anxiety motifs, which he successfully translated into paintings such as The Scream. It is also an indication that Anxiety was created in Berlin, just like the portraits. In any case, the pointed-bearded Przybyszewski figure is no longer present in the prints from the following year.

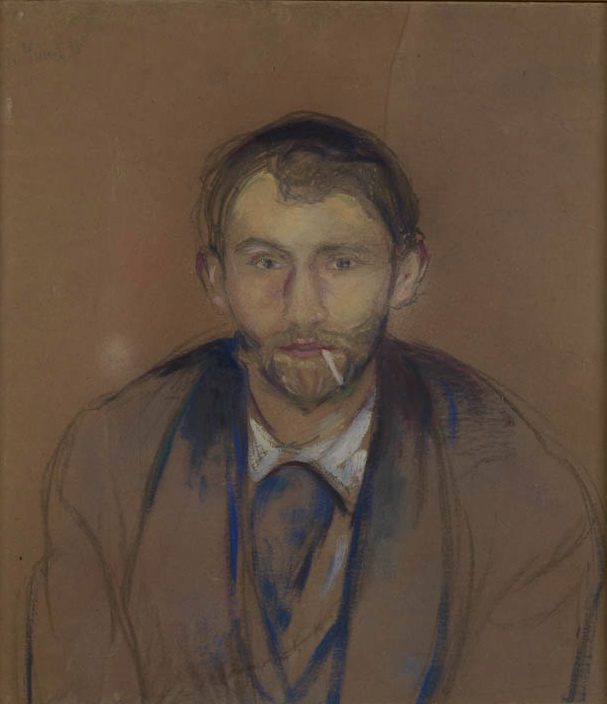
Stanisław Przybyszewski, 1895. Oil and tempera on cardboard. 62.5 × 55.5 cm. Munch Museum, Oslo

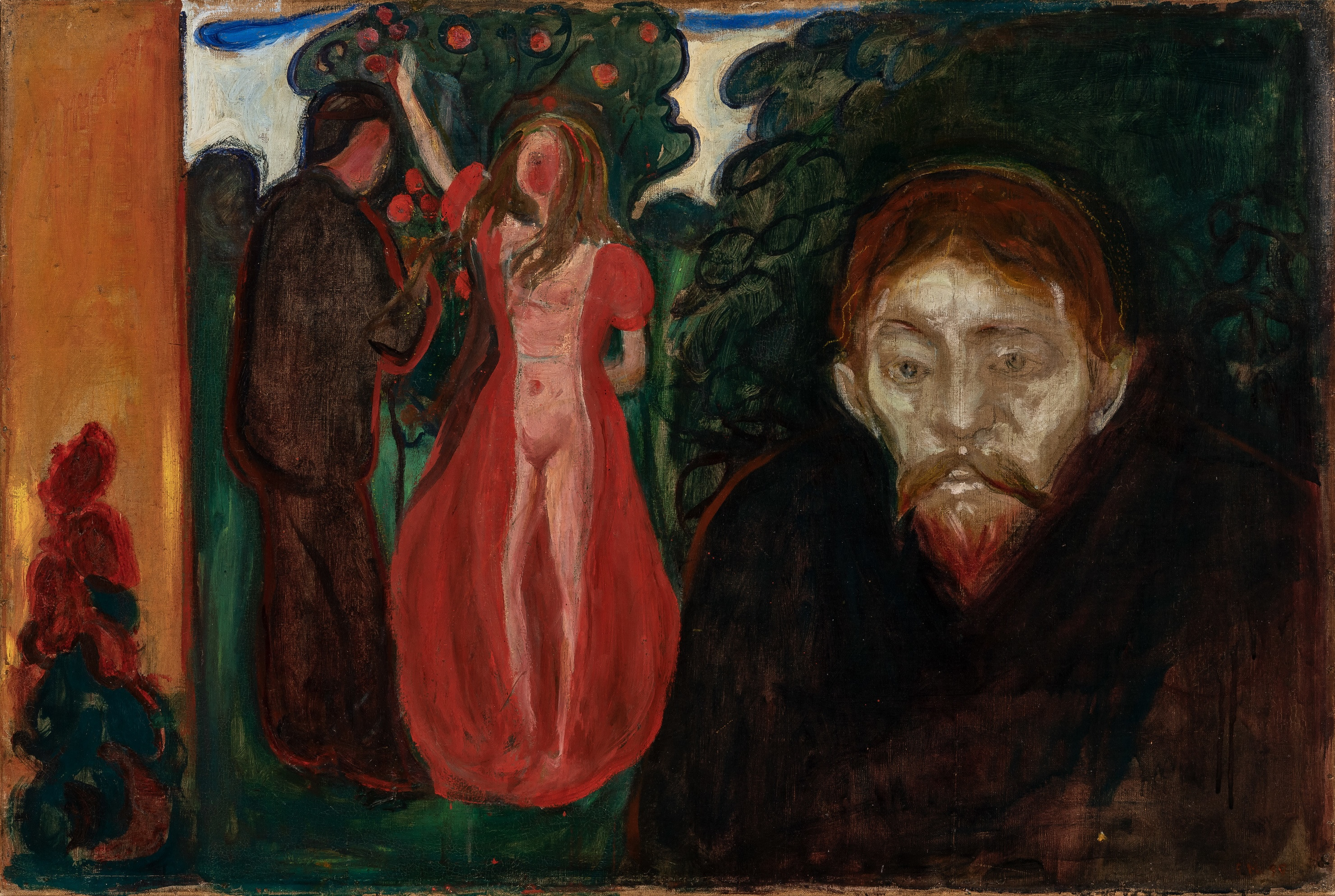
Jealousy (1895), Oil on canvas. 67 × 100.5 cm. Kunstmuseum Bergen

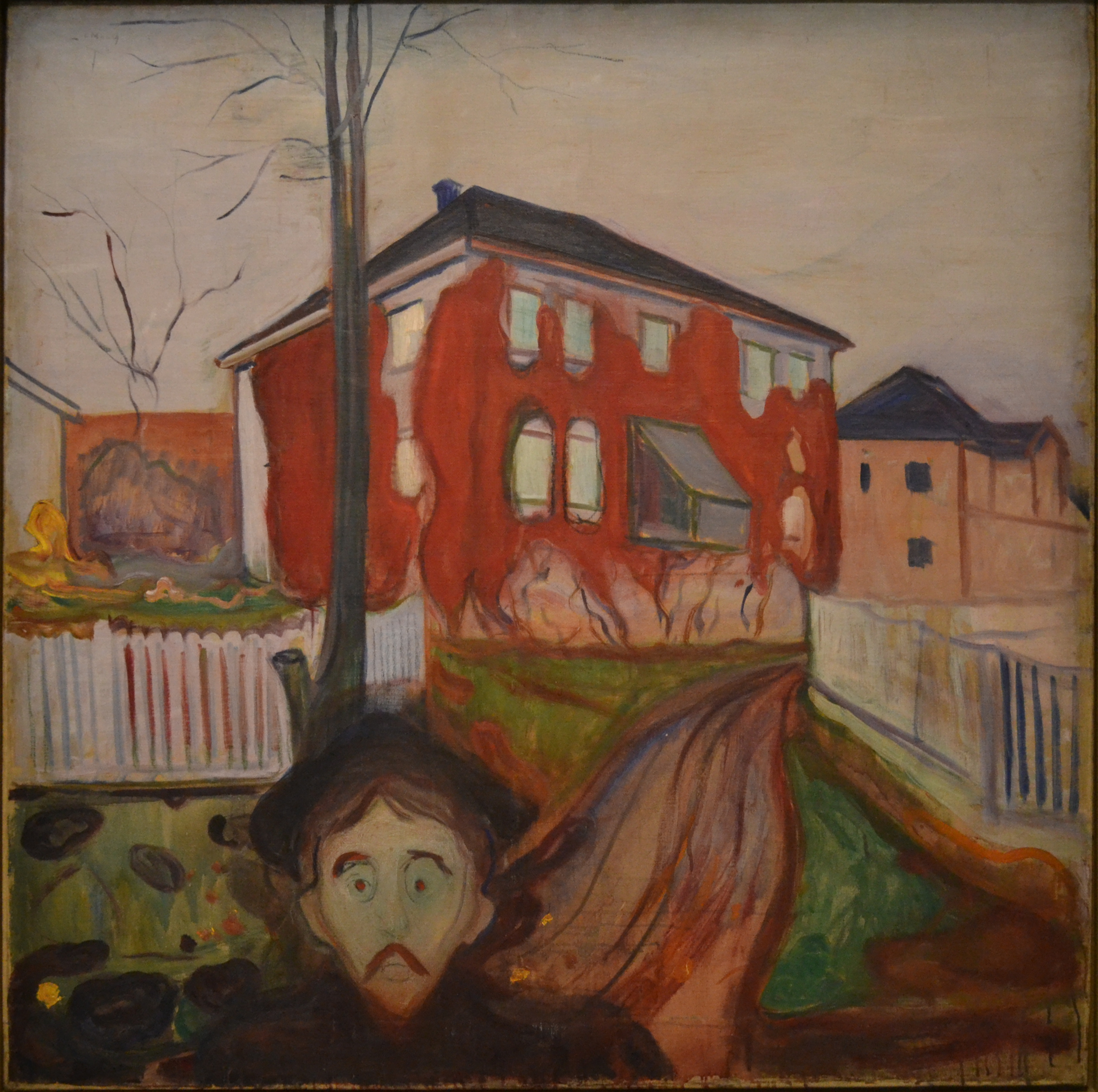
Red Virginia Creeper, 1898–1900. Oil on canvas. 121 × 119.5 cm.Munch Museum, Oslo

== Interpretation ==
=== Autobiographical references ===
Arne Eggum relates the oncoming crowd in the painting to a personal experience of Munch's, which already served as the starting point for Evening on Karl Johan: Late one evening, the 22-year-old Munch was walking restlessly along Karl Johans gate, the main boulevard of Kristiania, now Oslo, in search of his lover Milly Thaulow, whom he gave the pseudonym “Mrs. Heiberg” in his literary writings. A crowd of people streamed towards him on the boulevard. Munch had an anxiety attack and felt as if he were about to fall. He described in his diaries: "He couldn't feel his legs; they seemed to refuse to carry him. All the people passing by looked so strange and peculiar, and he thought they were staring at him, all those faces, pale in the evening light."

Milly Thaulow was three years older and married to Munch's cousin Carl Thaulow (a brother of the painter Frits Thaulow). The relationship was a forbidden love affair, at the end of which Munch declared: “After that, I gave up all hope of ever being able to love.” In the painting Anxiety, Eggum identifies “Mrs. Heiberg” as the woman in the foreground under the idealized halo and “Mr. Heiberg” as the man with the top hat. The fact that the woman with the bonnet has tripled in the prints also fits into the picture for him, because Munch had admitted elsewhere that he always saw “Mrs. Heiberg” in every woman who passed by.

=== Symbolic expression of fear ===
However, Gerd Woll sees the composition of Fear as less influenced by personal experience and more as a concentrated expression of mood and feeling, as is typical of symbolism. In doing so, Munch also picks up on a current of the zeitgeist, the feeling of social decay that was widespread in the Fin de siècle. Reinhold Heller interprets the green-faced mass of anonymous people, who in their dark clothes are reminiscent of a funeral procession, not only as obstacles in the viewer's path, but as modern city dwellers who are accustomed to constantly encountering ugliness and alienated from the majestic nature that lies before them. In this context, Arne Eggum speaks of a “funeral procession of ghosts” that the viewer looks directly into the eyes. According to Oskar Kokoschka, Munch's greatness lay in his ability to “diagnose the panic that lay beneath and behind so-called progress.”

In his publication The Tree of Knowledge of Good and Evil, Munch wrote about the Anxiety prints: “I see all people behind their masks – smiling, calm faces – pale corpses rushing restlessly along a winding path whose end is death.” Akseli Gallen-Kallela described: “Munch does not make art for art's sake – that would be child's play for him – but for the sake of the terrible fear that torments him”, and Joseph Beuys explained: “Art was a means for him to free himself from this fear. This gave rise to his new world of art, and that was, of course, a newly acquired world.”

== See also ==
- List of paintings by Edvard Munch
- 1894 in art
