= Caricature Portrait of Tulla Larsen =

Painting by Edvard Munch

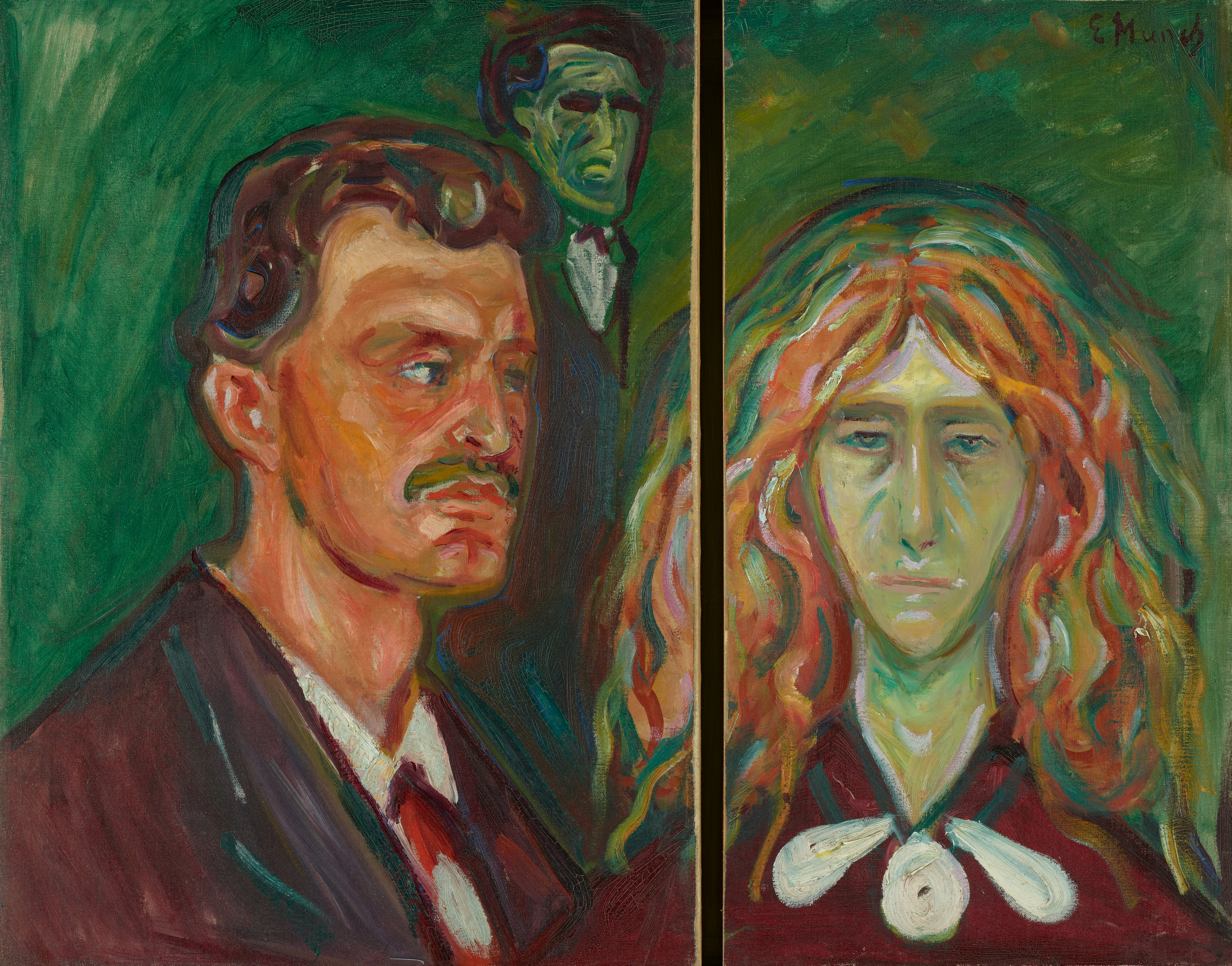
Self-Portrait against a Green Background (left) and Caricature Portrait of Tulla Larsen (right) were one painting until Munch sawed it in half.

Caricature Portrait of Tulla Larsen (Norwegian: Karikert portrett av Tulla Larsen) is an oil on canvas painting by Edvard Munch, from 1905. It is in the collection of the Munch Museum in Oslo.

== History and description ==
The painting, depicting Munch and Tulla Larsen (1869-1942) was sawn in half by Munch after he was hit in the left hand by a gunshot following a bedroom scuffle (an incident covered in the painting The Death of Marat and the related series). In the green background, the man with the couple is Arne Kavli (1878-1970), also a painter and husband of Tulla, whom she married in 1903.

In Gerd Woll's catalogue raisonné from 2008, Self-Portrait against a Green Background is listed as number 645 and Caricature Portrait of Tulla Larsen is listed as number 646.

== See also ==
- List of paintings by Edvard Munch
