= Jealousy (Munch) =

Painting by Edvard Munch

- Sjalusi (Norwegian)
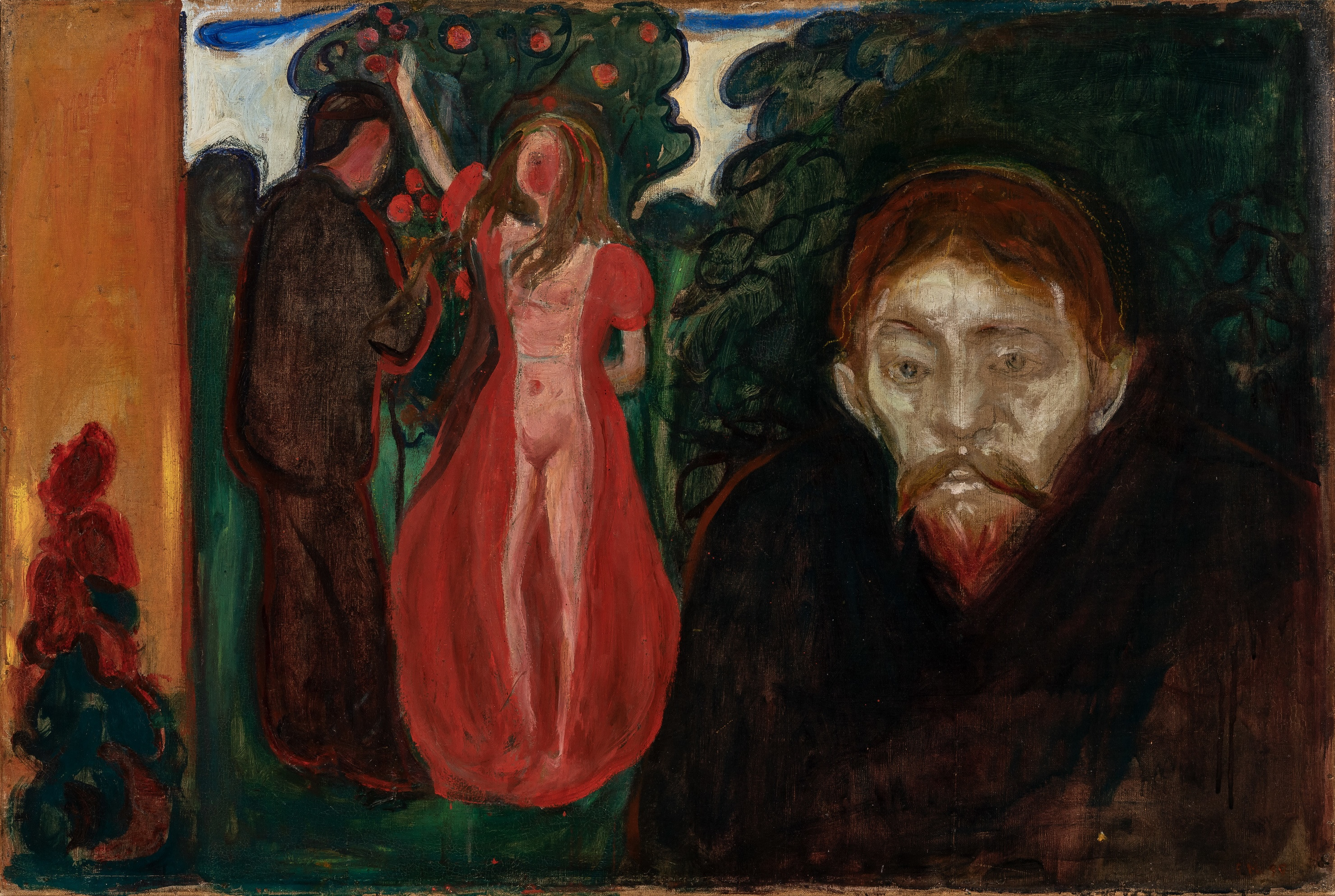
- Artist: Edvard Munch
- Year: 1895
- Medium: Oil on canvas
- Dimensions: 66.8 cm × 100 cm (26.3 in × 39 in)
- Location: Bergen Kunstmuseum (Rasmus Meyer's Collection), Bergen

Jealousy (Norwegian: Sjalusi) is an oil on canvas painting by Norwegian artist Edvard Munch depicting sexual jealousy. Munch returned to this image throughout his whole life - he completed no less than 11 painted versions of Jealousy. The first painting was executed in 1895, and the last was made during the 1930s. Munch also created four lithograph versions and one drypoint of Jealousy.

The painting was made during European period and is based on expressionism style. The 1895 oil on canvas painting, perhaps the most famous version, is now housed at Rasmus Meyer Collection, Bergen and it measures 67 cm (26 in) by 100 cm (39 in). In addition, eight painted versions are possessed by the Munch Museum in Oslo and one version is located at the Städel Museum in Frankfurt am Main (on loan from a private collection). Another version, executed between 1898 and 1900, titled Jealousy in the Bath was sold at Sotheby's in 1982 and is now a private collection in London.

== Gallery ==
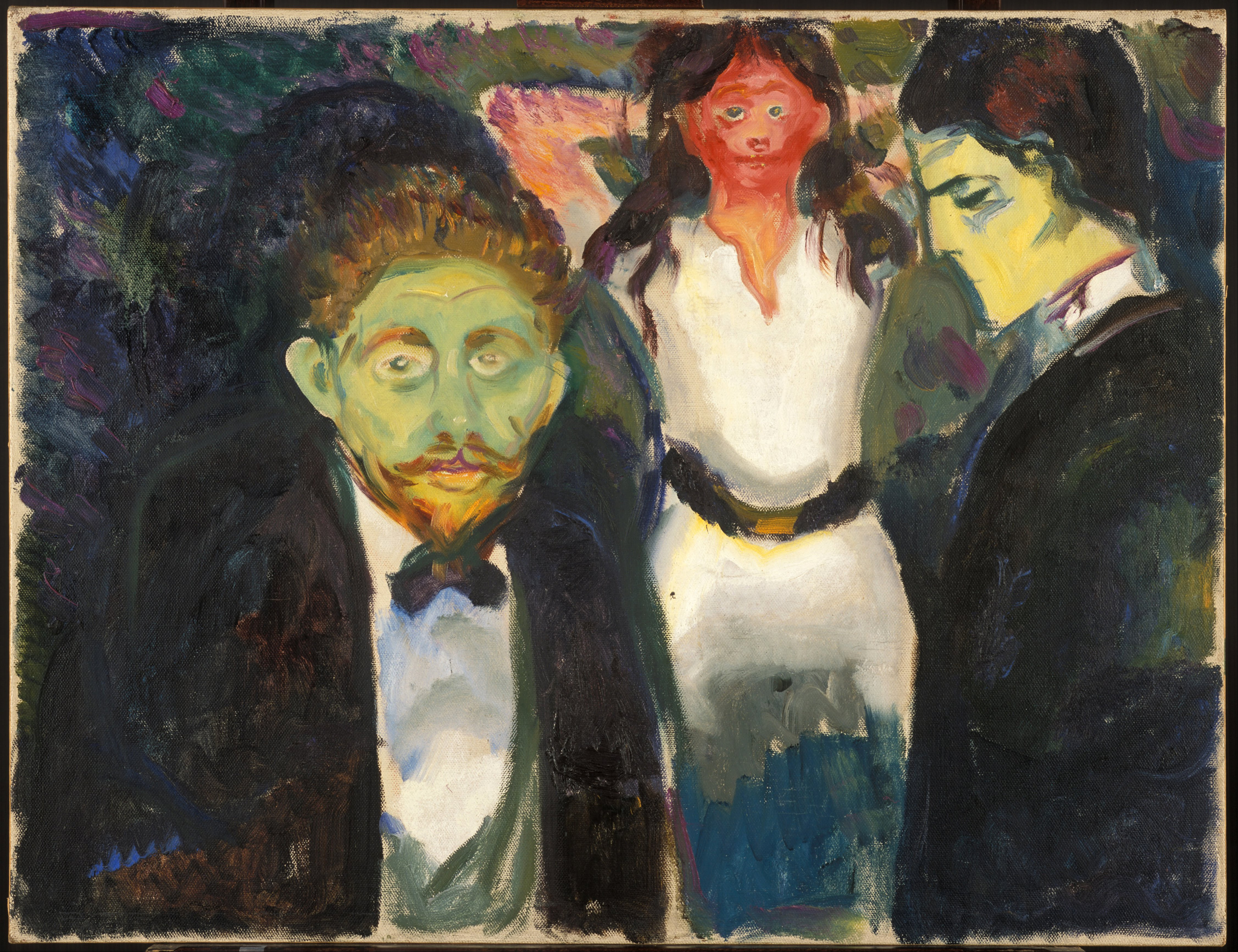
The Munch Museum holds this version which was possibly painted in 1907.

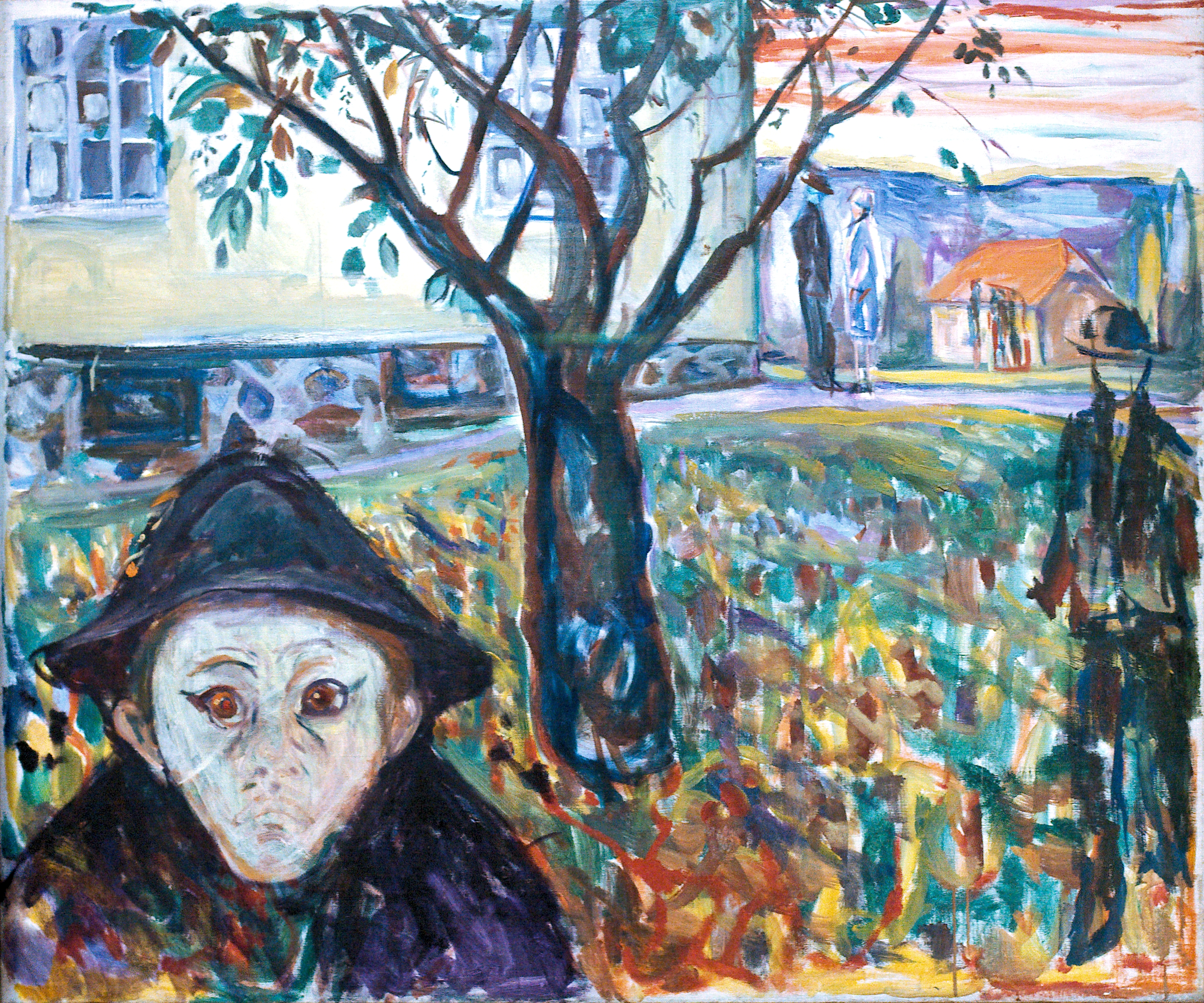
This version, located at the Munch Museum, is called Jealousy in the Garden and was most probably completed between 1929 and 1930.

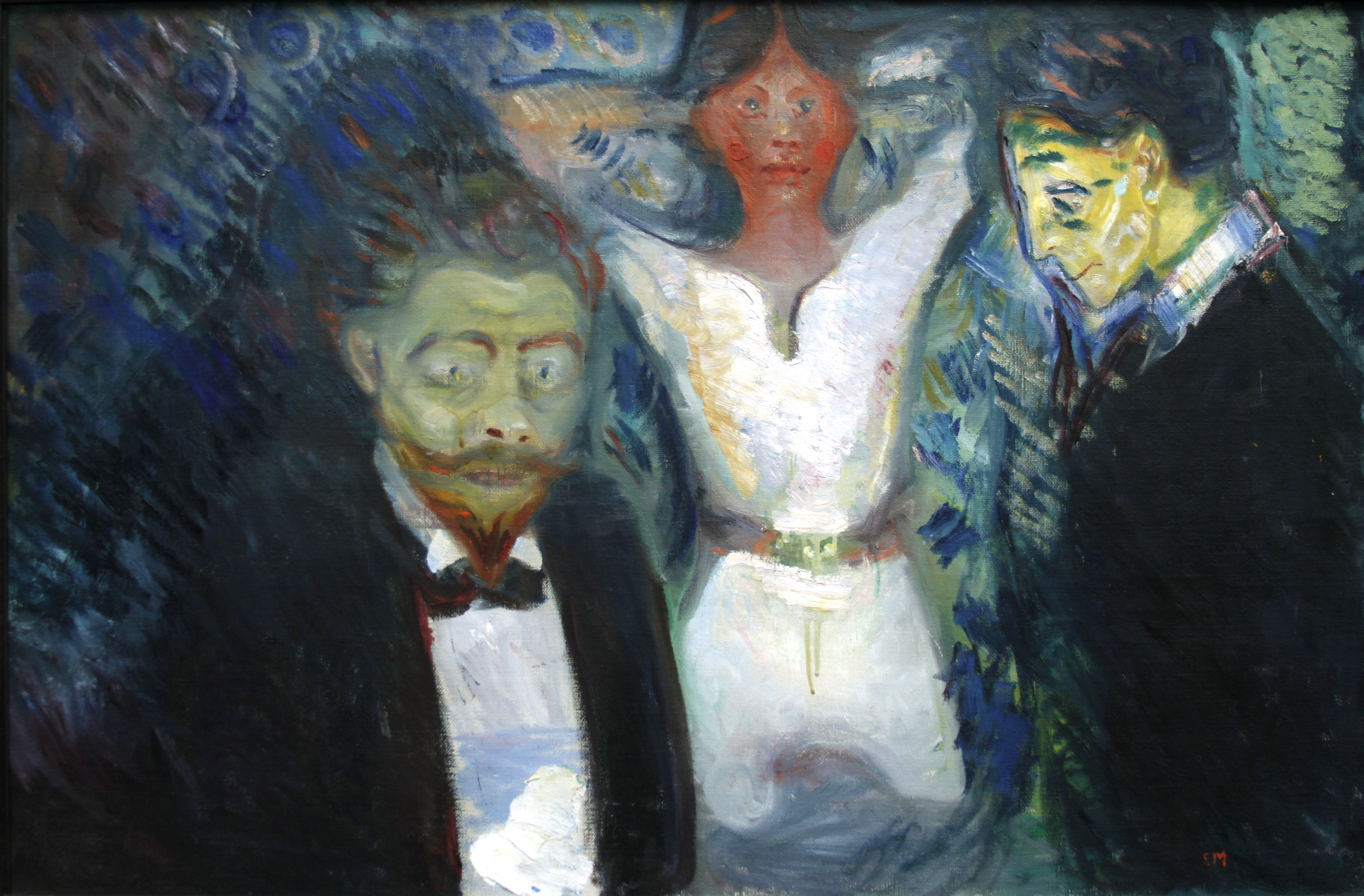
This version is privately owned and is on loan to the Städel Museum, Frankfurt am Main, Germany

== See also ==
- List of paintings by Edvard Munch
