= Gunnar Fougner =

Norwegian architect (1911–1995)

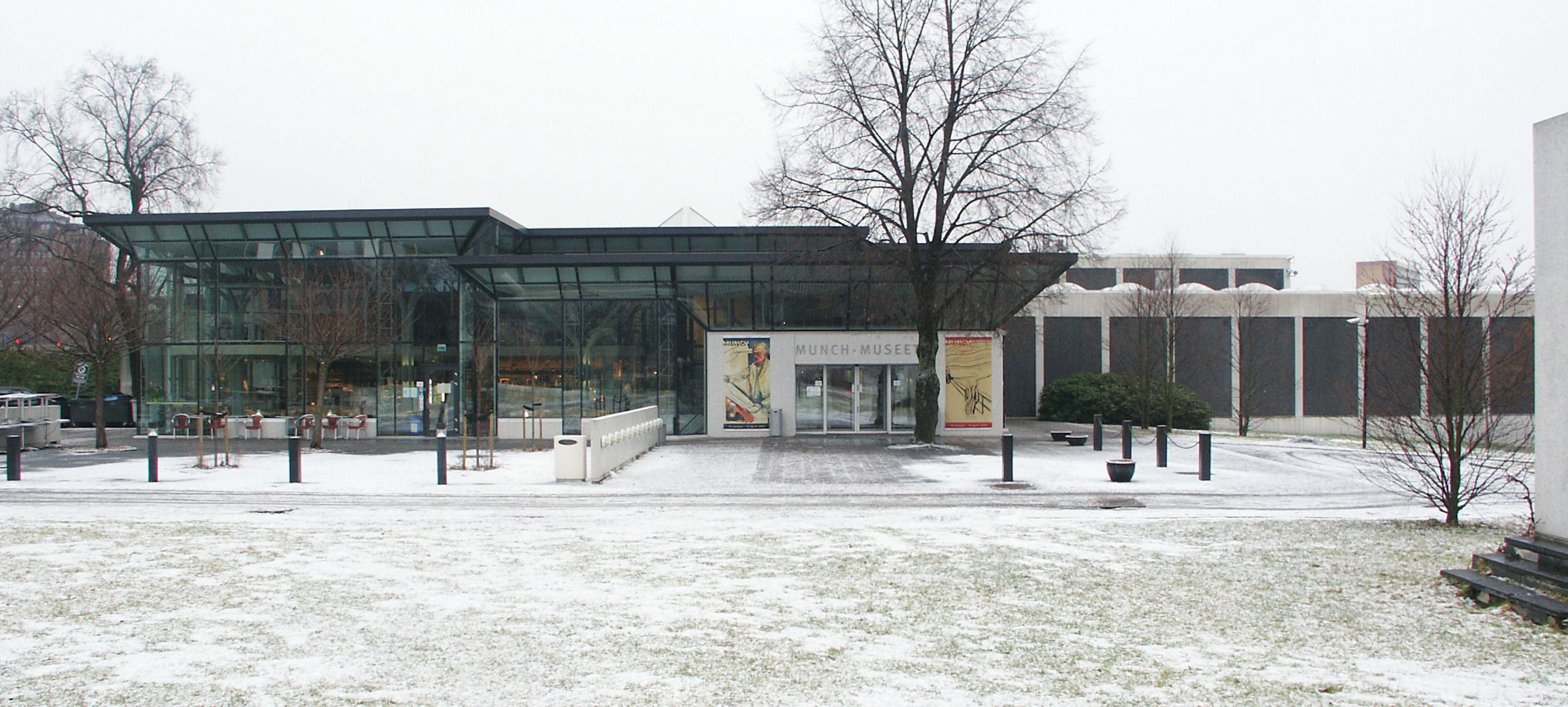
Munch Museum in Oslo

Gunnar Fougner (January 5, 1911 – October 20, 1995) was a Norwegian architect.

Gunnar Fougner was born in Lillehammer, Norway. He attended the Norwegian Institute of Technology in Trondheim where he graduated in 1934. Fougner began his first job as an assistant architect working for Ove Bang 1935–1938, followed by employment by Arne Korsmo in 1939.

He was an active resistance fighter during the Nazi occupation of Norway. Fougner left Norway in July 1940 to join a Norwegian group of special troops. Among other activities, he assisted in the transport of resistance fighters between Norway and Shetland. During the liberation of Norway, he was in a group under Major Leiv Kreyberg who led the liberation of Allies POWs in North Norway.

After World War II, he entered private practice in Lillehammer. He would later enter into partnership with Einar Myklebust. During the period 1955–1966, they won a number of major competitions. They completed the design of both the Munch Museum in Oslo, (1953–63)) and the Institute of Odontology in Bergen (1955–63).

== Other sources ==
- Nansen, Liv (2002) Gunnar Fougner. En arkitekt

== Related reading ==
- Aas, Oddvar (1980) Norske penneknekter i eksil: en beretning om Stockholms-legasjonens (pressekontor under krigen) (Oslo: Tiden) ISBN 8210019201
- O'Connor, Bernard (2014) Sabotage in Norway (Lulu Press, Inc.) ISBN 9781291380224
- Ulstein, Ragnar (1989) Etterretningstjenesten i Norge 1940-45 (Oslo: Cappelen) ISBN 8202124018
