= Einar Myklebust =

Norwegian architect and professor

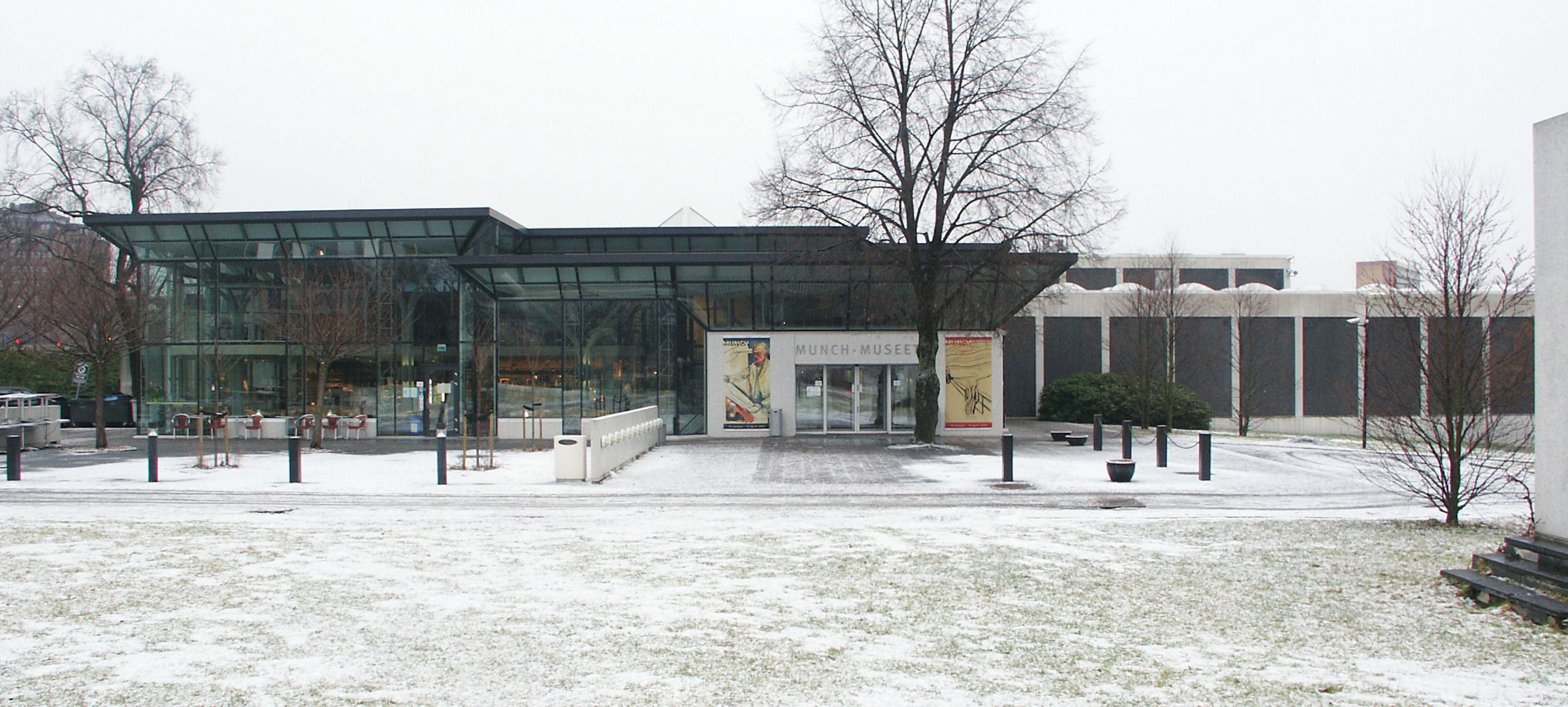
Munchmuseet, Oslo.

Einar Frithjof Myklebust (17 May 1922 – 9 June 2017), was a Norwegian architect and professor at NTH (now (NTNU).

Einar Myklebust worked between 1953–1964 together with the architect Gunnar Fougner. He was professor from 1964–1970 in Byggekunst IV (monumental architecture), architecture department, Norwegian Institute of Technology (now Norwegian University of Science and Technology), Trondheim. From 1970 he worked for the newly founded architectural firm Arkiplan in Trondheim. After a few years, he moved to Stavanger, where he has his own practice. Myklebust designed the Edvard Munch Museum in Oslo, Norway with Fougner and played a large role in the renovation and expansion that took place in 1994, to commemorate the 50th anniversary of Munch's death.

Myklebust made his debut as an artist in 1995. As an artist, he is self-taught. Since his debut, he has been exhibited both at home and abroad. He now paints full-time from his apartment in Stavanger.

== Works ==
Include:

- 1963, Fjellkirken at Sjusjøen (together with architect Gunnar Fougner).
- 1963, Odontologisk institutt, Årstadvollen, Bergen (together with architect Gunnar Fougner).
- 1963, Munchmuseet at Tøyen, Oslo (together with architect Gunnar Fougner).
- 1994, Munchmuseet, Tøyen, Oslo. Updating and rehabilitation.
- 1995, Jærmuseet, first building of the new museum building (together with architectural firm Helliesen, Wåge og Hallgren).

He has also designed a number of schools.
