= Kiss by the Window =

Painting by Edvard Munch

- The Kiss
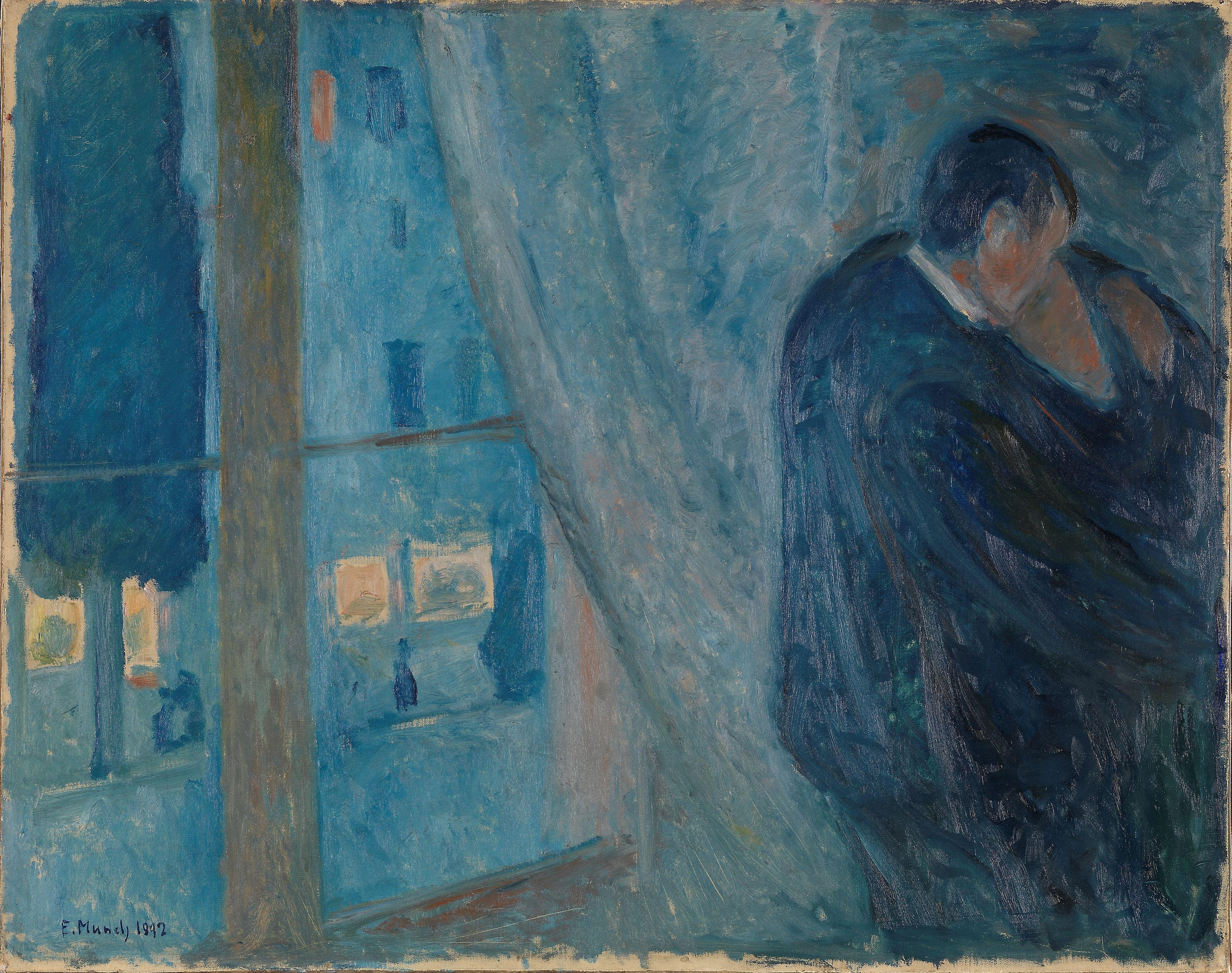
- Year: 1892
- Medium: oil paint, canvas
- Dimensions: 73.0 cm (28.7 in) × 92.0 cm (36.2 in) × 2.2 cm (0.87 in)
- Location: National Museum of Norway
- Accession: NG.M.02812

The Kiss by the Window (or Kissing by the Window or simply The Kiss) is an oil-on-canvas painting by the Norwegian artist Edvard Munch, from 1892. It is held in the National Gallery (Norway), in Oslo. It forms part of his series known as The Frieze of Life, which treats the cycle of life, death and love and was produced between 1893 and 1918.

== See also ==
- List of paintings by Edvard Munch
