= Arne Eggum =

Norwegian art historian

Arne Kristian Eggum (born August 24, 1936) is a Norwegian art historian who mainly focused his scientific work on Edvard Munch.

From January 1963 until January 1964, Eggum helped prepare the opening of the Munch Museum He got his PhD in art history in 1968 from the University of Oslo with his thesis Studier i norsk kunstteori (‘Studies in Norwegian art theory’). In March 1969, Eggum was appointed as a curator of Oslo municipality’s art collections, The Munch Museum, with an especial responsibility for the painting department. From August 1970 he was permanently employed at the same institution. From 1969 to 70, he was the only art reviewer in the national newspaper Dagbladet.

In February 1972, Arne Eggum was appointed as manager and chief curator of The Munch Museum, and subsequently he was permanently employed in this position.

Eggum also participated in other activities under the auspices of Oslo municipality’s art collections: public guided tours as part of the programme «Know your city», cataloguing and publishing works in «Amaldus Nielsen’s painting collection» in 1973, in «Rolf E. Stenersen’s gift for the city of Oslo» in 1974, and in the «Idea competition on decorating 22 schools in Oslo» in 1973–76. As the manager of a museum, Eggum produced an extensive number of frequently-quoted scientific articles and books, many in connection with international exhibitions. He retired at 65, but since then he has continued to publish articles, e.g. «The Scream as a Vision of Despair», Fondation Louis Vuitton, 2015. Lately he has set forth several theories which may challenge common interpretations of some of Munch’s works of art, through talks with Annelita Meinich on the Norwegian radio programme “Going out in Culture”.

== Bibliography ==
- Munch. Edvard Munch, "Alpha and Omega": Together with "The First Human Beings", "Burlesque Motifs", "The City of Free Love", "The History of the Passion", and Other Caricatures : [Exhibition] Munch Museum, March 25-August 31, 1981. Oslo: The Museum, 1981.
- Eggum, Arne, Edvard Munch, and Mara-Helen Wood. Edvard Munch: The Frieze of Life; Essays. London: National Gallery Publications, 1992.
- Eggum, Arne, and Robert Rosenblum. Edvard Munch: Symbols Et Images; National Gallery of Art, Washington; 1978. 1978.
- Eggum, Arne. Edvard Munch. London: Thames & Hudson, 1984.

== Literature ==
Hege Blom: Arne Kristian Eggum, in: Store norske leksikon, 2005–2007 (Digitalized)
