= Munch Museum =

Art museum in Oslo, Norway

- Munch-museet

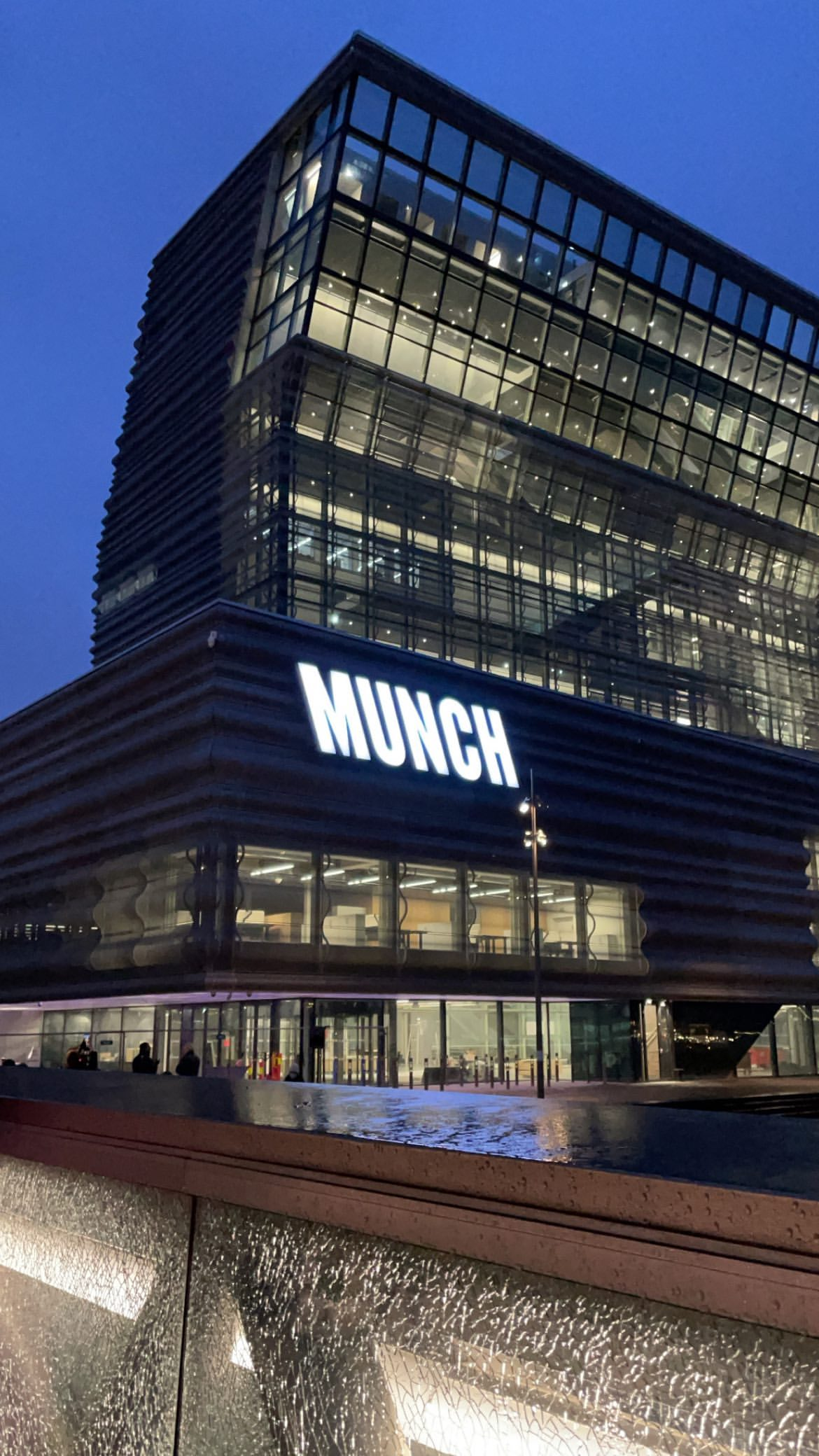
- The Munch Museum at Bjørvika in December 2020
- Interactive fullscreen map
- Established: 29 May 1963
- Location: Oslo, Norway
- Coordinates: 59°54′21″N 10°45′19″E
- Type: Art museum
- Key holdings: The Scream, Madonna, The Sick Child, Puberty
- Architects: Juan Herreros (Bjørvika); Gunnar Fougner, Einar Myklebust (Tøyen)
- Owner: Oslo Municipality
- Public transit access: Oslo Central Station, Bjørvika tram stop
- Website: www.munchmuseet.no/en/

Munch Museum (Norwegian: Munch-museet), marketed as MUNCH since 2020, is an art museum in Bjørvika, Oslo, Norway, dedicated to the life and works of the Norwegian artist Edvard Munch.

The Munch Museum exhibits the full breadth of Edvard Munch's works, along with contemporary art exhibitions. They also offer a programme of music, performances, talks, and activities for young people.

The history of the Munch Museum began at Tøyen, when it was decided in 1951 that this would be the museum's location. During his lifetime, Edvard Munch was already involved in discussions about establishing a museum, but it was not until 1963—one hundred years after his birth—that the museum finally opened.

In 2021, the museum moved to a new building in Bjørvika, now known as MUNCH. In 2025, the museum recorded 775,000 visitors.

== About the Collection ==
Edvard Munch's bequest to the municipality of Oslo comprises one of the world's largest collections of works by a single artist. The museum's collection consists of almost 28,000 artworks and more than 42,000 unique museum objects.

The museum is also home to the collections of Rolf Stenersen, Amaldus Nielsen, and Ludvig O. Ravensberg. Together, the four collections, which were all donated by private individuals, provide insight into a unique period of art history extending over almost 100 years.

=== Collection ===
MUNCH conducts research across art history, conservation, curatorial practice and mediation. They carry a particular responsibility for the field of knowledge around Edvard Munch.

==== Exhibition ====
The museum displays five collection exhibitions at any given time, showcasing the breadth of Edvard Munch's artistic practice.

In addition, the museum presents 6–7 temporary exhibitions each year, featuring modern and contemporary art by artists other than Munch.

==== Conservation ====
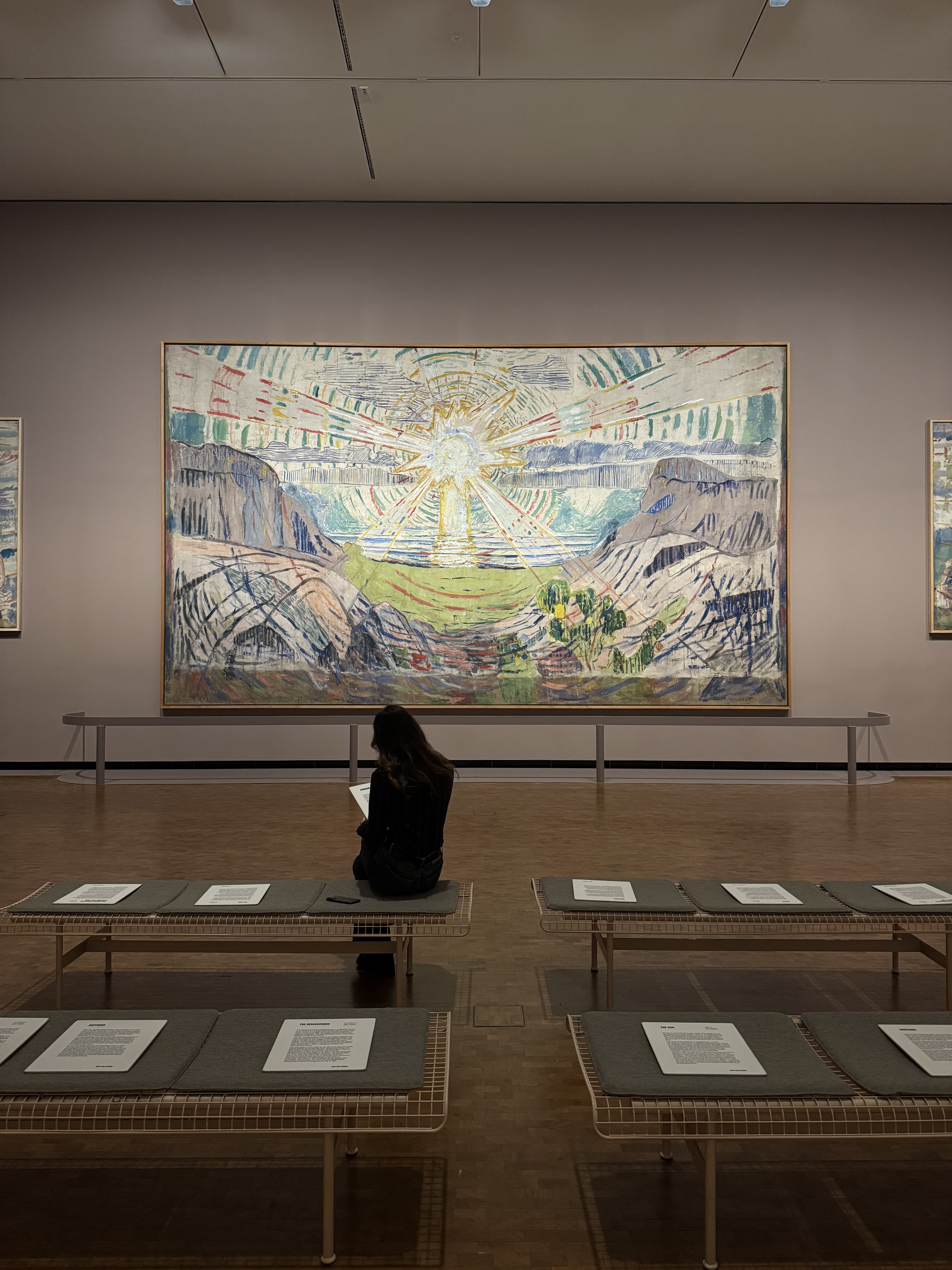
The Sun by Edvard Munch, as seen in the Monumental exhibition at MUNCH.

Munch's sometimes untraditional use of materials and experimental techniques give his pictures a completely unique appearance. They also pose a number of challenges for the museum's Conservation Department, which is responsible not only for the care of the collection, but also for conducting research about it.

Today MUNCH has a Conservation Department, in which paintings conservators, paper conservators, art technicians and museum scientists work to care for, and conduct research into, Munch’s art. These professionals devote a lot of time to assessing the condition of works and deciding whether they can be exhibited or loaned to another museum. There is interest in exhibiting Munch's art, and some paintings are out on loan almost continually. Finding a balance between looking after the artworks and putting them on display is something the Museum must constantly take into consideration.

==== Research ====
The research at MUNCH primarily covers conservation, art history, curatorial practice, and mediation.

Our research gives insights into Edvard Munch, modernism, contemporary art, and museum practice. These insights are shared through research-based exhibitions, popular science platforms, and academic publications.

==== Innovation ====
For MUNCH, innovation is about making art meaningful and relevant to a diverse audience. At the same time, the museum makes space for artistic collaborations where ideas, forms of expression, and formats can be explored.

==== The Research Library ====
MUNCH has a research library that manages the collection, including all documentation and accrued knowledge about Edvard Munch, and makes it available for in-house as well as external research.

The library's collection consists amongst other things of literature pertaining to Edvard Munch, literature pertaining to visual art, Edvard Munch's private library and transcriptions of Munch's correspondence, journals and notes. It is possible to visit the library upon request.

== Munch on the move: From Tøyen to Bjørvika ==
=== Original ===
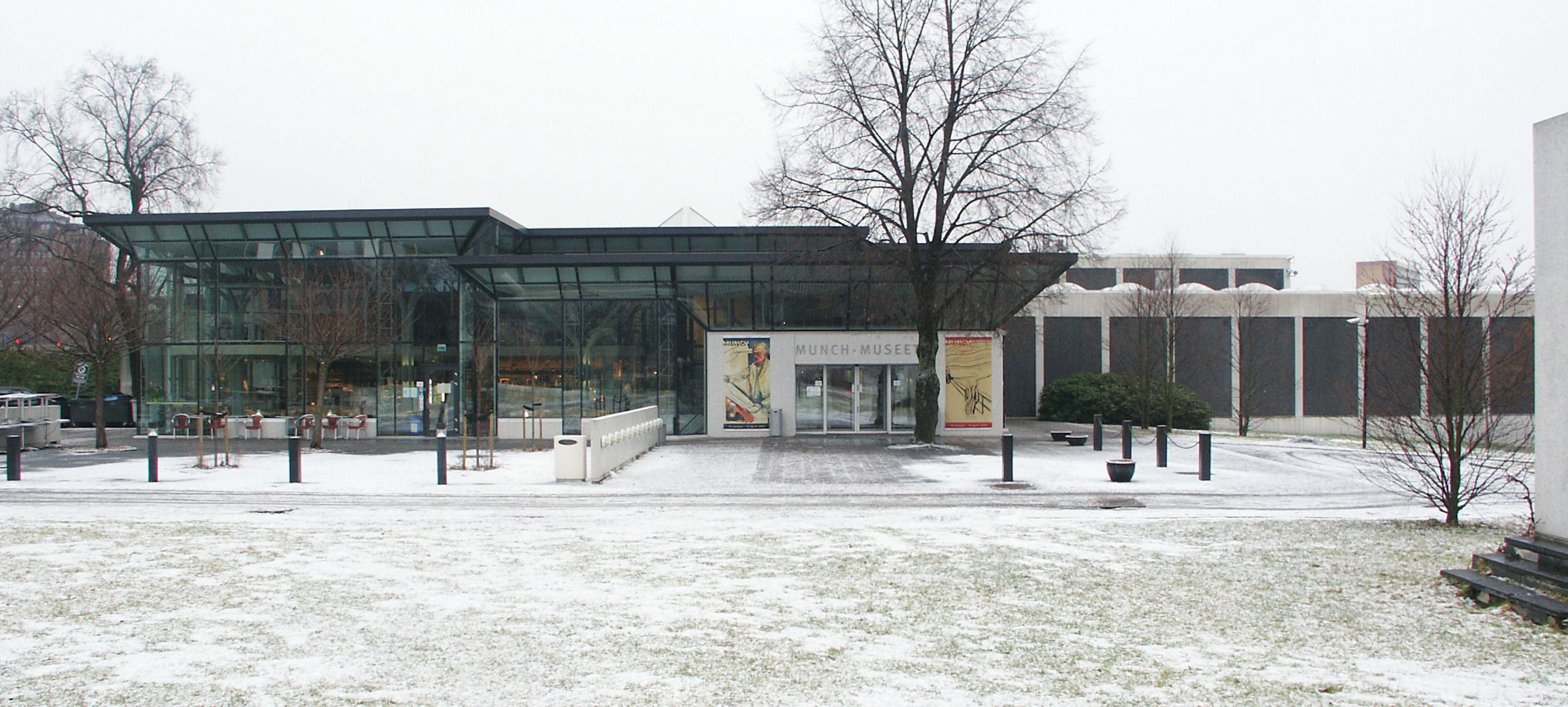
The original Munch Museum at Tøyen, Oslo

The original Munch Museum was situated at Tøyen in the Oslo borough of Gamle Oslo. Construction of the museum was financed from the profits generated by the Oslo municipal cinemas and opened its doors in 1963 to commemorate what would have been Munch's 100th birthday. Its collection consists of works and articles by Munch, which he donated to the municipality of Oslo upon his death, and additional works donated by his sister Inger Munch, as well as various other works obtained through trades, including duplicate prints.

The museum had in its permanent collection well over half of the artist's entire production of paintings and at least one copy of all his prints. This amounted to over 1,200 paintings, 18,000 prints, six sculptures, as well as 500 plates, 2,240 books, and various other items. The museum also contained educational and conservation sections, and has facilities for the performing arts.

The museum structure was designed by architects Einar Myklebust and Gunnar Fougner. Myklebust also played an important role in the expansion and renovation of the museum in 1994 for the 50th anniversary of Munch's death. This site was also the location of filming for an Olsenbanden-movie from 1984.

The last exhibition of the museum while at Tøyen, Oslo was opened in May 2021, which lasted until 1 October.

=== Current ===
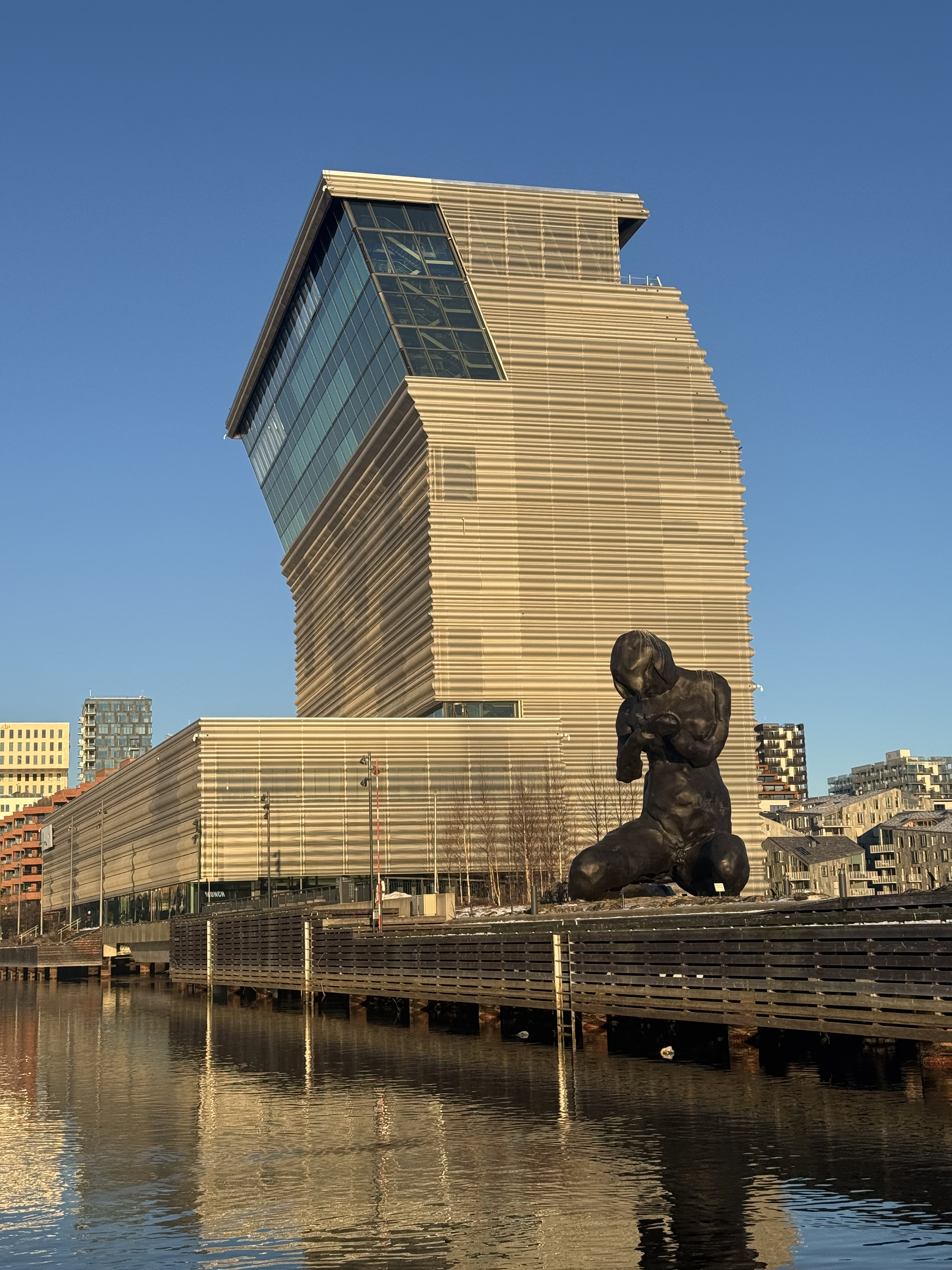
The current museum at Bjørvika, Oslo

Previously, in 2008, the City of Oslo promoted an architectural competition for a new Munch Museum in the area of Bjørvika, a new urban development where the Oslo Opera House is also located. The competition was won in 2009 by Spanish architect Juan Herreros and his studio Herreros Arquitectos (now estudio Herreros).

Before the local election in Oslo in 2011, the Oslo Progress Party decided that they would no longer support the project due to economic concerns. After the election, in December 2011, the Oslo City Council voted to end the project. Instead, the council wanted to consider improving the current museum or moving the collection to Nasjonalgalleriet.

In May 2013, the Oslo City Council finally took the decision to revive the project, and move the museum to its new site on the waterfront, next to the Oslo Opera House. Construction started in September 2015. The new museum has been widely criticised for its design, where it has been branded the unofficial world's largest collection of guard rails.

In summer 2021, 28,000 pieces of art were moved from the previous museum at Tøyen, to the new museum at Bjørvika, Oslo.

The museum was opened by King Harald V on 22 October 2021.

== 2004 armed robbery of two paintings ==
On Sunday, 22 August 2004, two paintings by Munch, The Scream and Madonna, were stolen from the Munch Museum by armed robbers who forced the museum guards to lie on the floor while they snapped the cable securing the paintings to the wall. The paintings were recovered by Oslo Police on 31 August 2006.

== Selected collection highlights ==
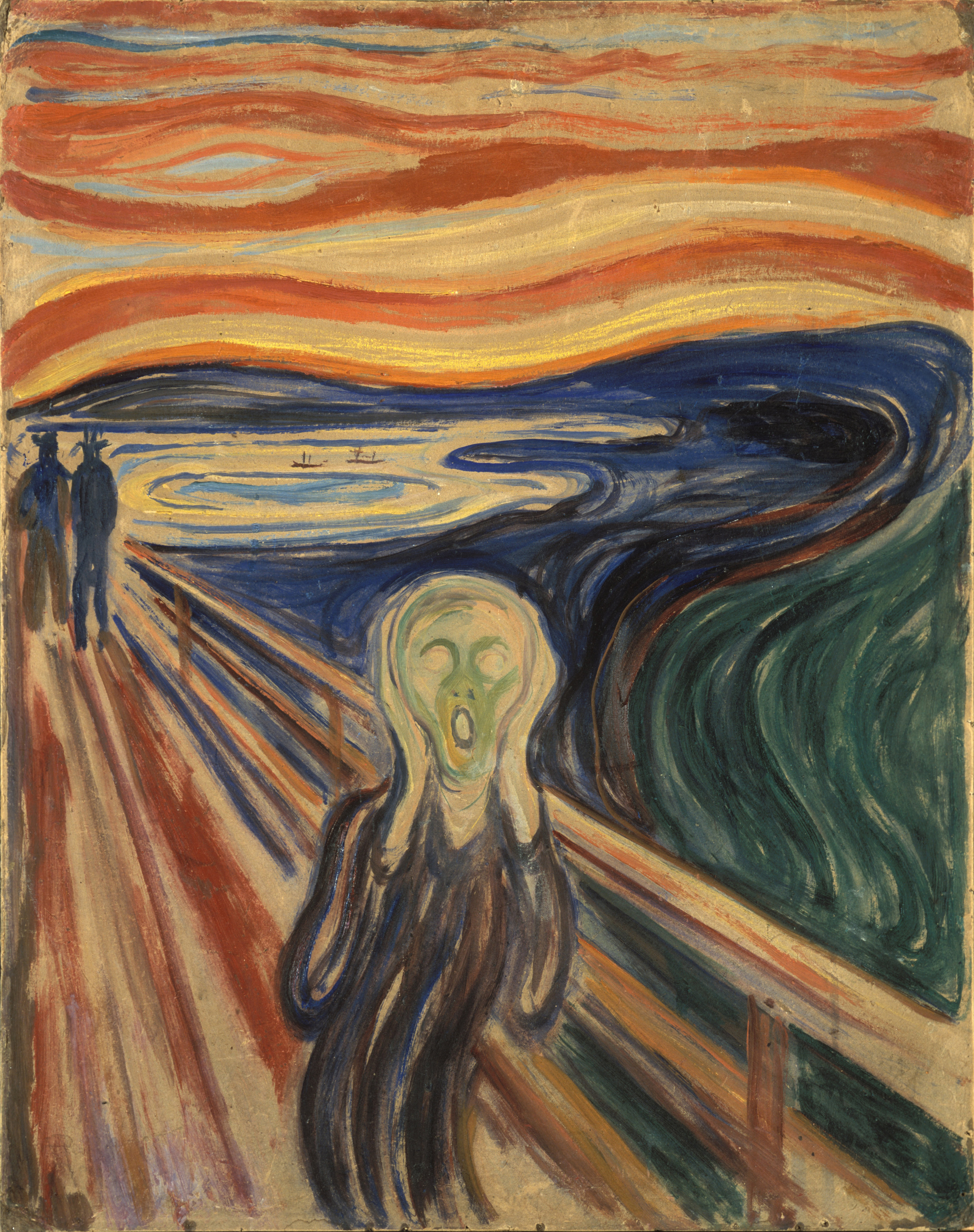
The Scream

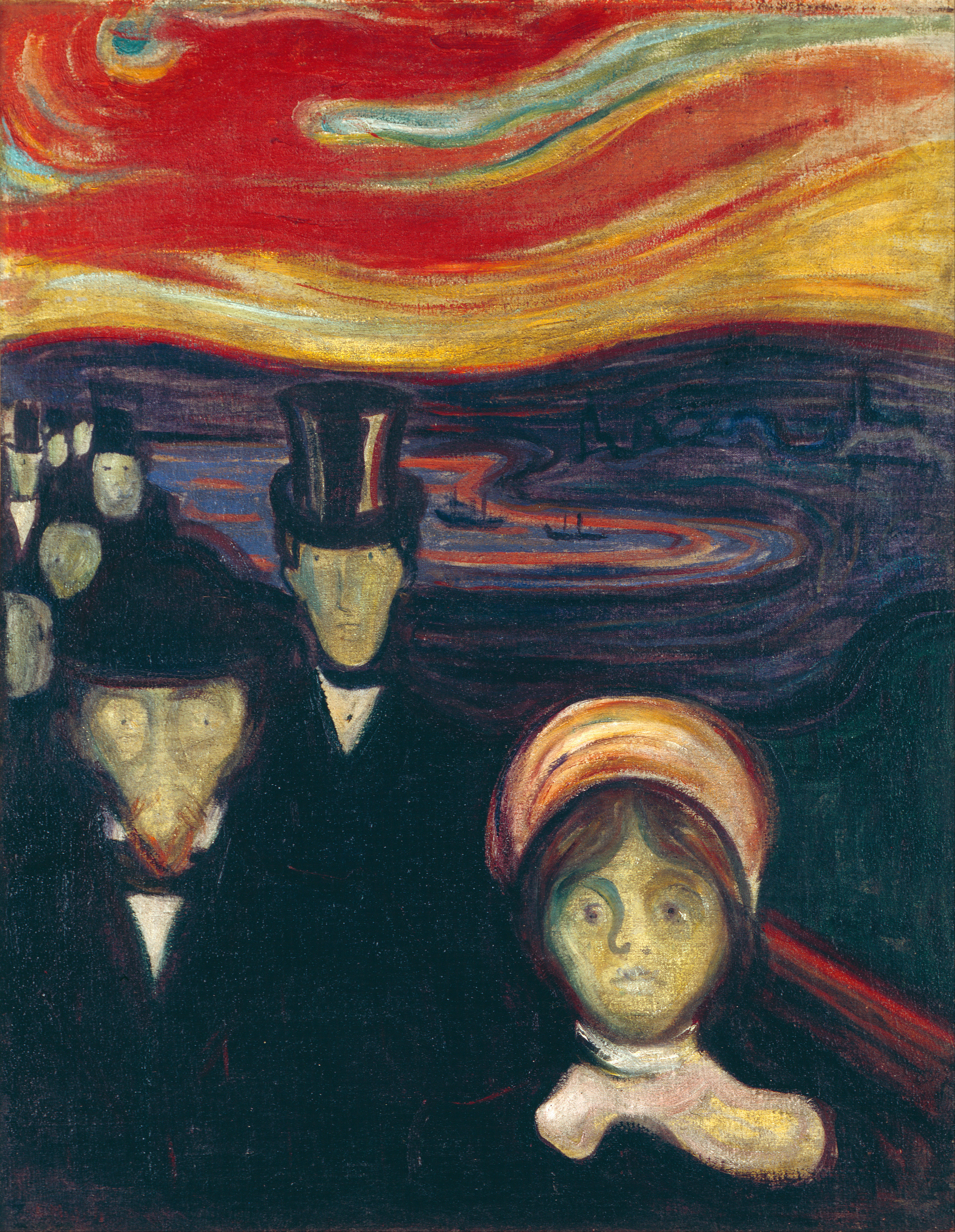
Anxiety

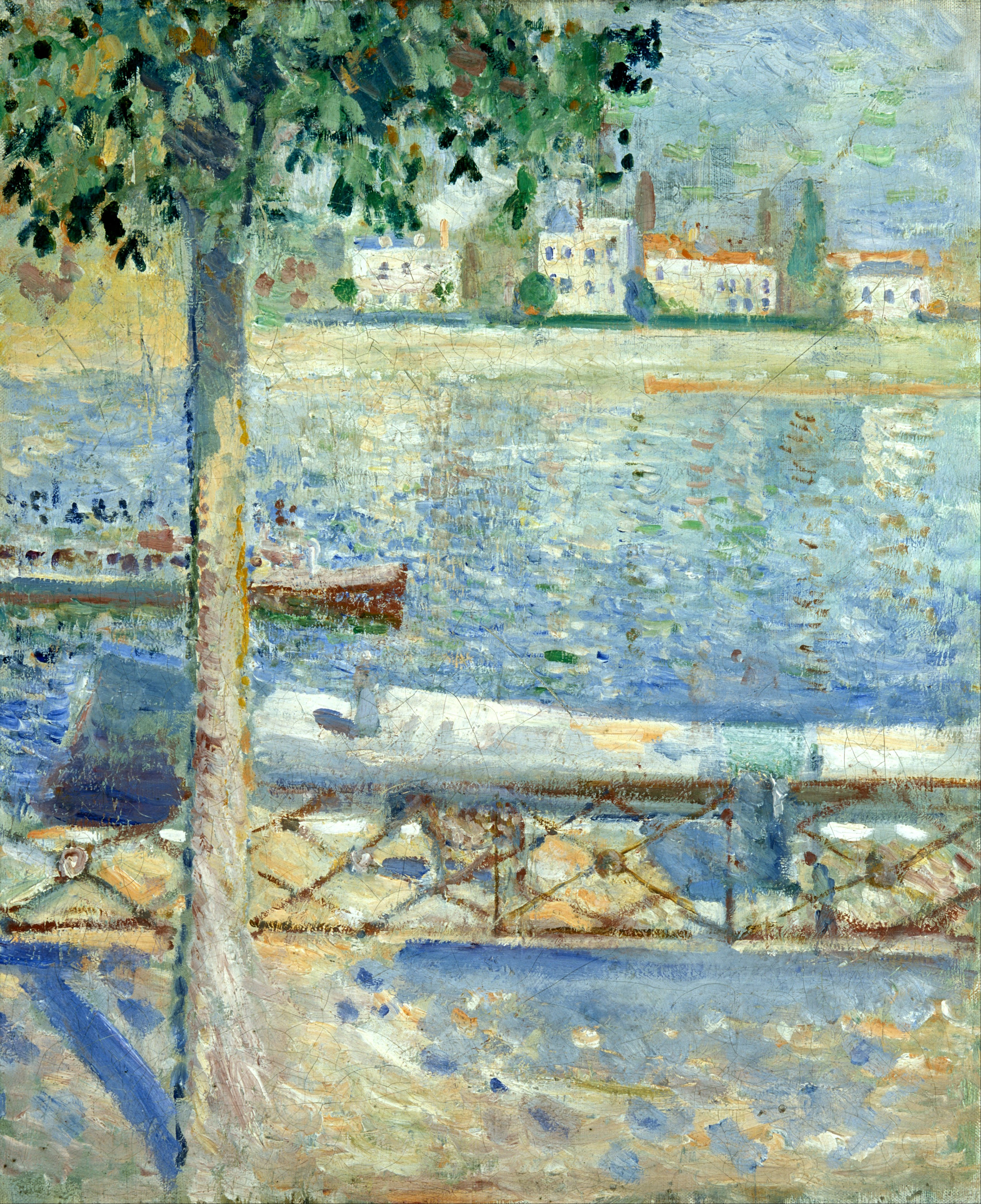
The Seine at Saint-Cloud

== See also ==
- List of single-artist museums

== Other sources ==
- Eggum, Arne; Gerd Woll, Marit Lande Munch At The Munch Museum (Scala Publishers, 2005)
- Langaard, Johan H. Edvard Munch: Masterpieces from the artist's collection in the Munch Museum in Oslo (McGraw-Hill. 1964)
