= Melancholy (Munch) =

Painting by Edvard Munch

- Melankoli (Norwegian)
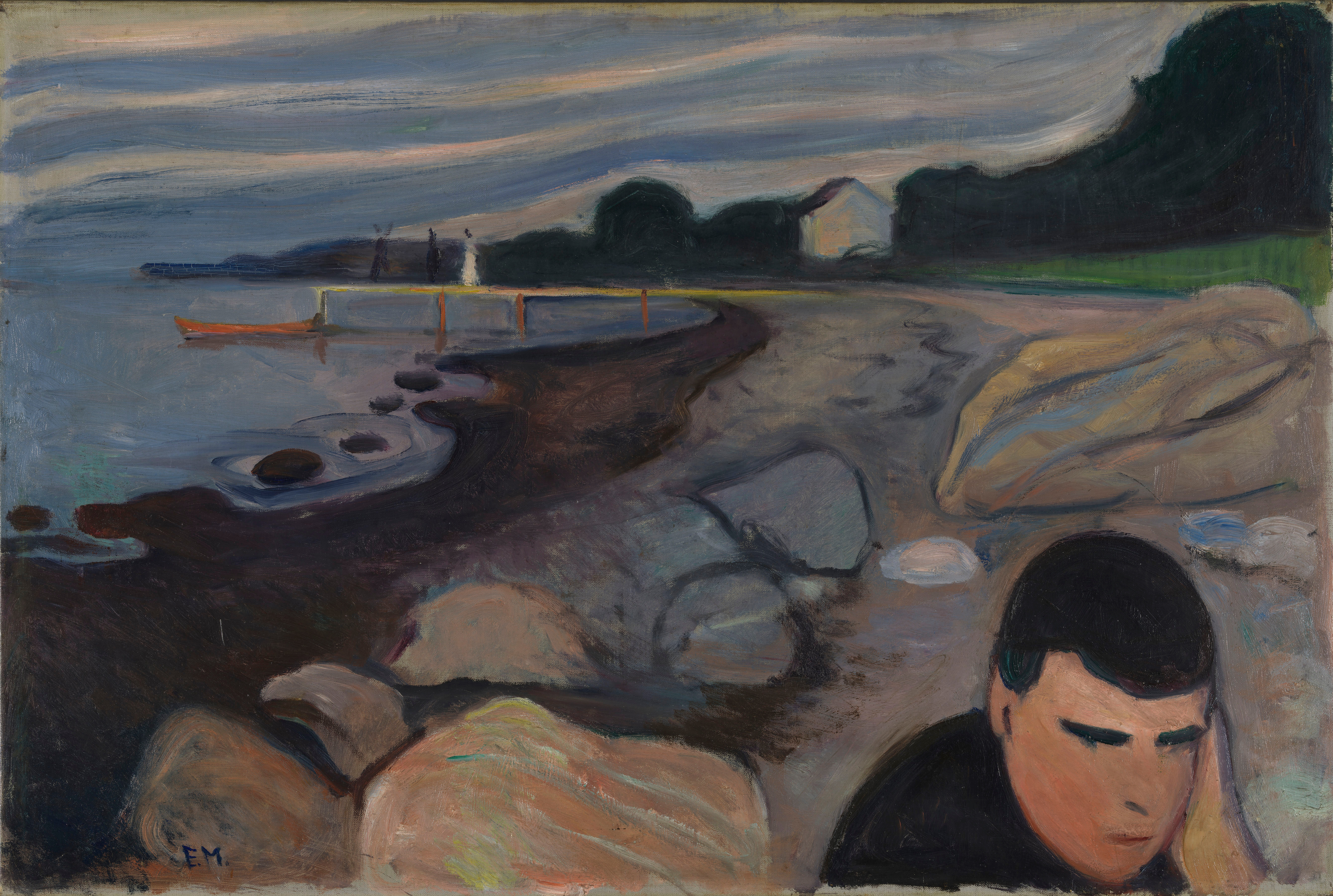
- Artist: Edvard Munch
- Year: 1892
- Medium: Oil on canvas
- Dimensions: 64 cm × 96 cm (25 in × 38 in)
- Location: National Museum of Norway, Oslo

Melancholy (Norwegian: Melankoli; also known as Jappe on the Beach, Jealousy or Evening) is a motif by the Norwegian painter Edvard Munch, which he executed in five paintings between 1891 and 1896 and two woodcuts between 1896 and 1902. It shows a man sitting on the beach with his head propped up in the foreground, while in the background a couple is on their way to a boat trip. The colors support the melancholic mood of the scene. In this motif, Munch processed the unhappy love affair of his friend Jappe Nilssen with the married Oda Krohg, which mirrored his own past relationship with a married woman. The melancholic figure in the foreground is therefore associated with both Munch's friend and the painter himself. Melancholy is considered one of the Norwegian painter's first symbolist paintings and is part of his Frieze of Life.

== Description ==
A male figure sits slumped on a rocky beach at the front edge of the picture plane. He has his head thoughtfully resting in his hand, a classic pose of melancholy. The 1892 version differs from the other paintings in that the figure is pushed completely into the lower right corner. The turned head and the direction of the hand reinforce a movement out of the picture. This corner position repeatedly draws the viewer's attention back to the landscape, which thus becomes an equally important part of the picture. In the upper part of the picture, a jetty can be seen with three figures on it: a couple and a man with oars. They are on their way to a yellow boat at the end of the jetty. The curved shoreline that continues behind the jetty creates an illusion of depth. It corresponds with the tree and cloud formations in the background.

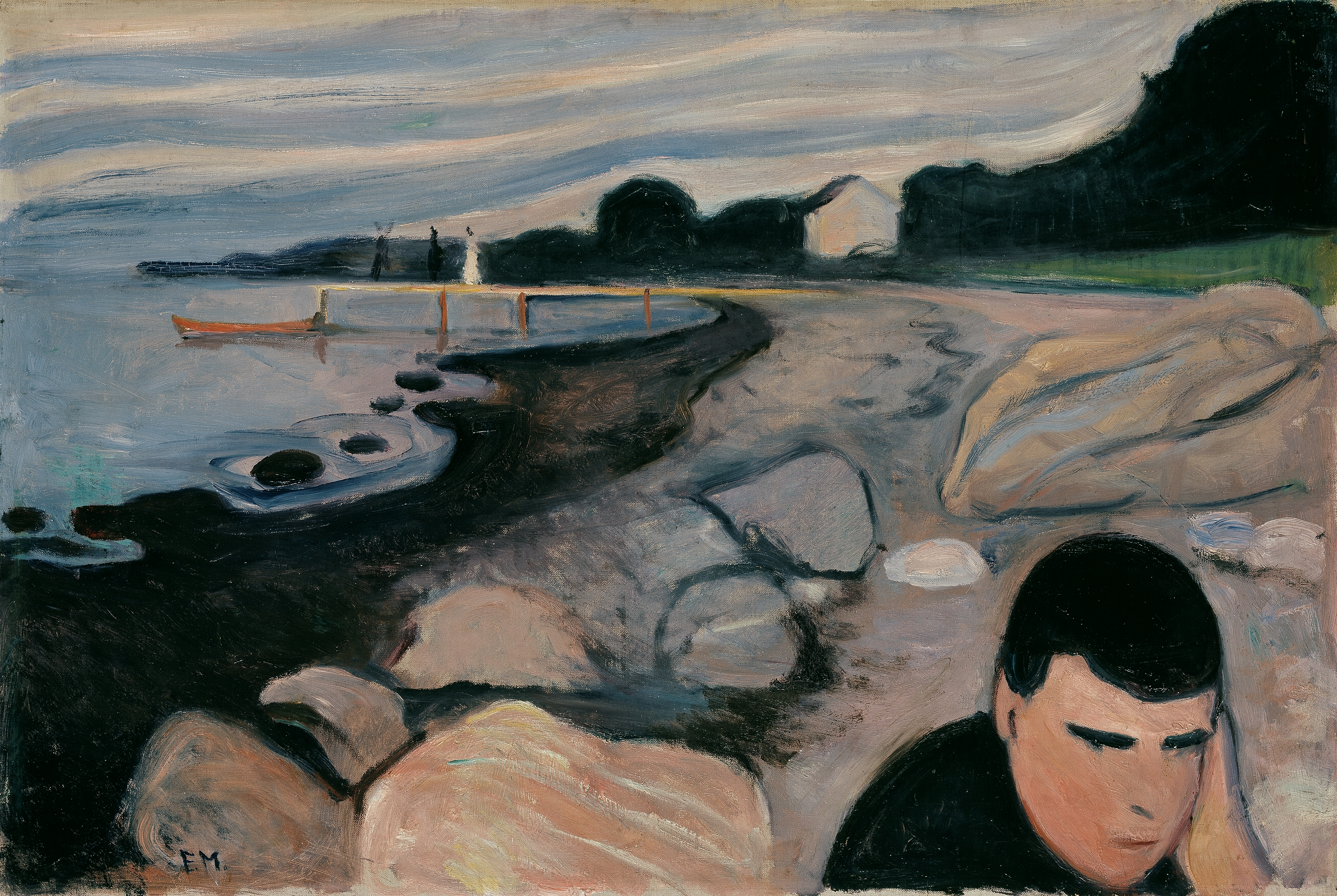
Melancholy (1892, detail)

The first version of the painting from 1891 is a mixture of different painting techniques: pastel, oil, and pencil. Parts of the canvas remained completely unpainted. According to Hans Dieter Huber, this gives the painting a dry, fresco-like effect. The later oil paintings also retain the flat forms with greatly simplified contours, reminiscent of Synthetism. There is no aerial perspective or shading, only the head and hand of the figure show three-dimensional plasticity. According to Tone Skedsmo and Guido Magnaguagno, the painting's broad brushstrokes and the "simplification and stylization of line, form, and color" anticipate the style of Munch's future works.

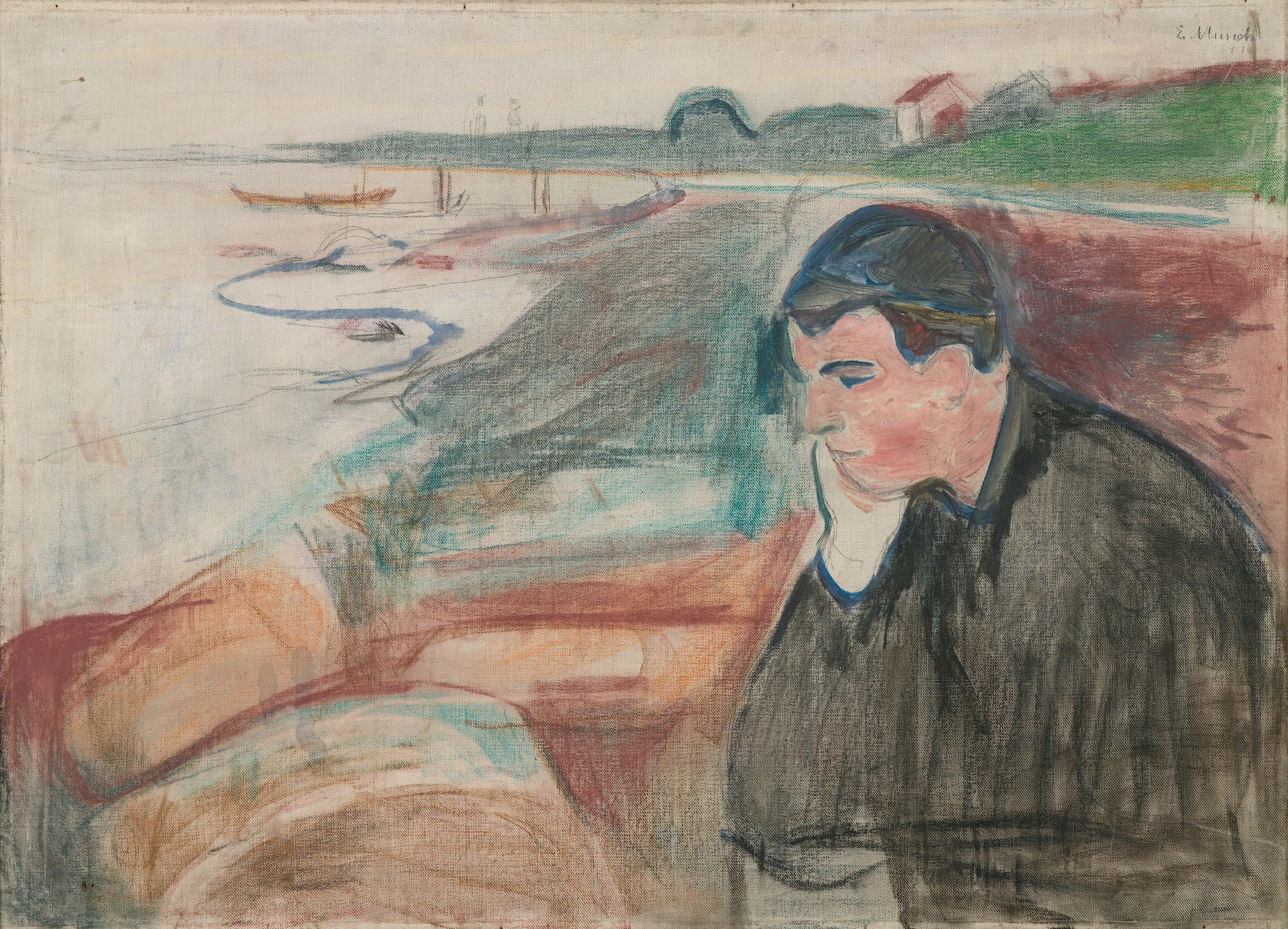
Evening. Melancholy, 1891. Oil, pencil and crayon on canvas. 73 × 101 cm. Munch Museum, Oslo.

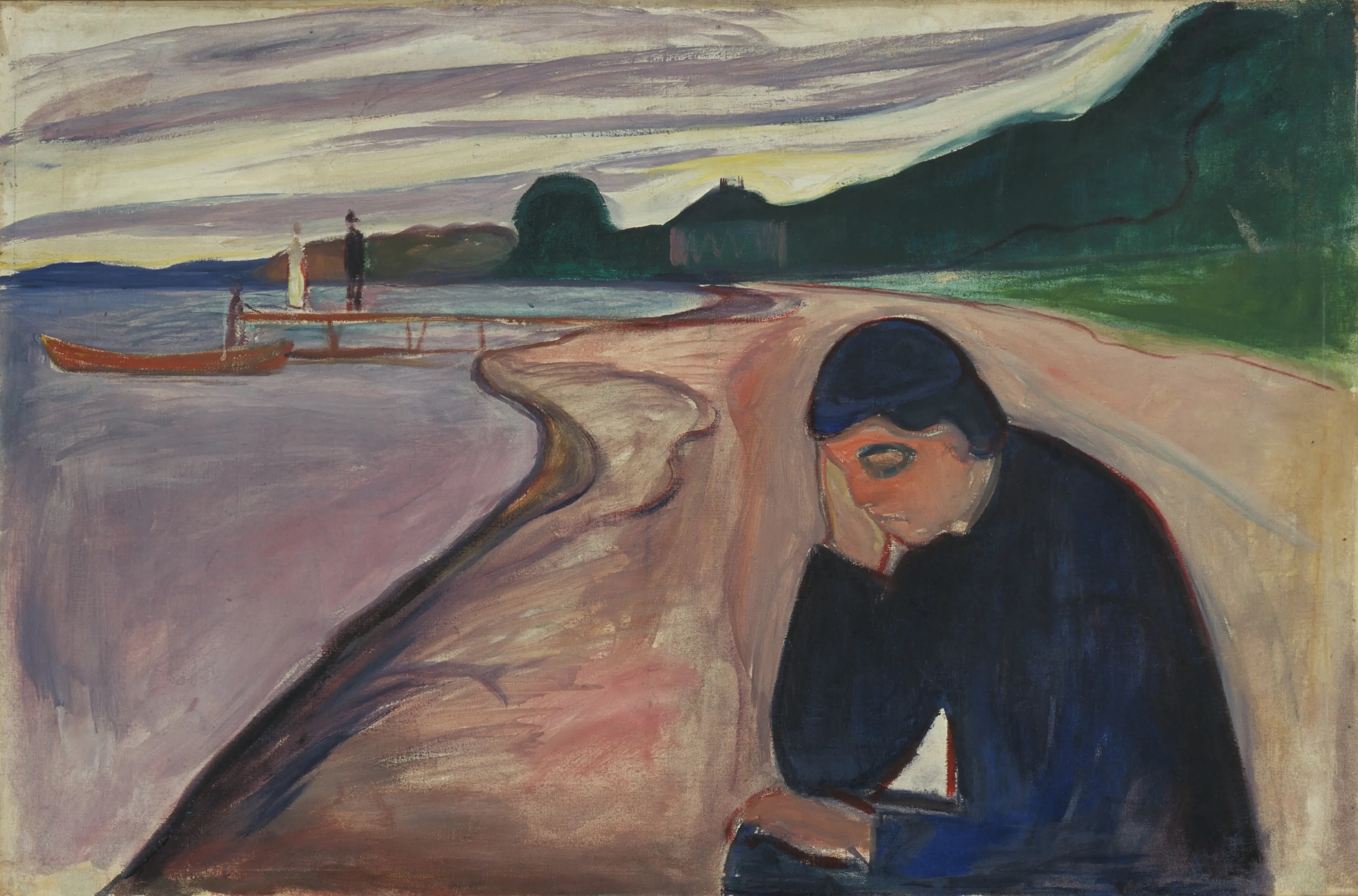
Melancholy, 1893. Oil on canvas. 86 × 129 cm. Munch Museum, Oslo.

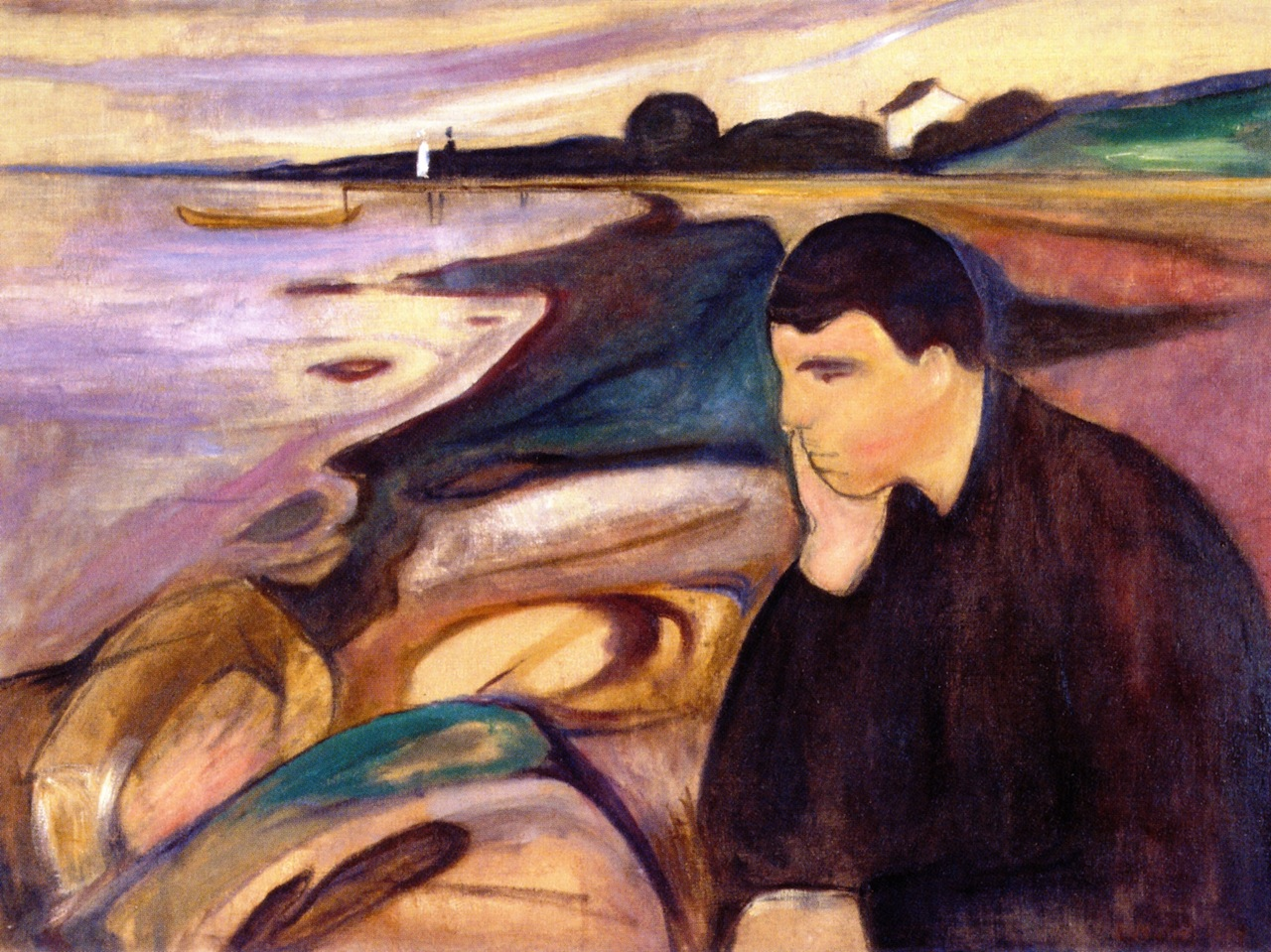
Melancholy, 1894. Oil on canvas. 72 × 98 cm. Private collection.

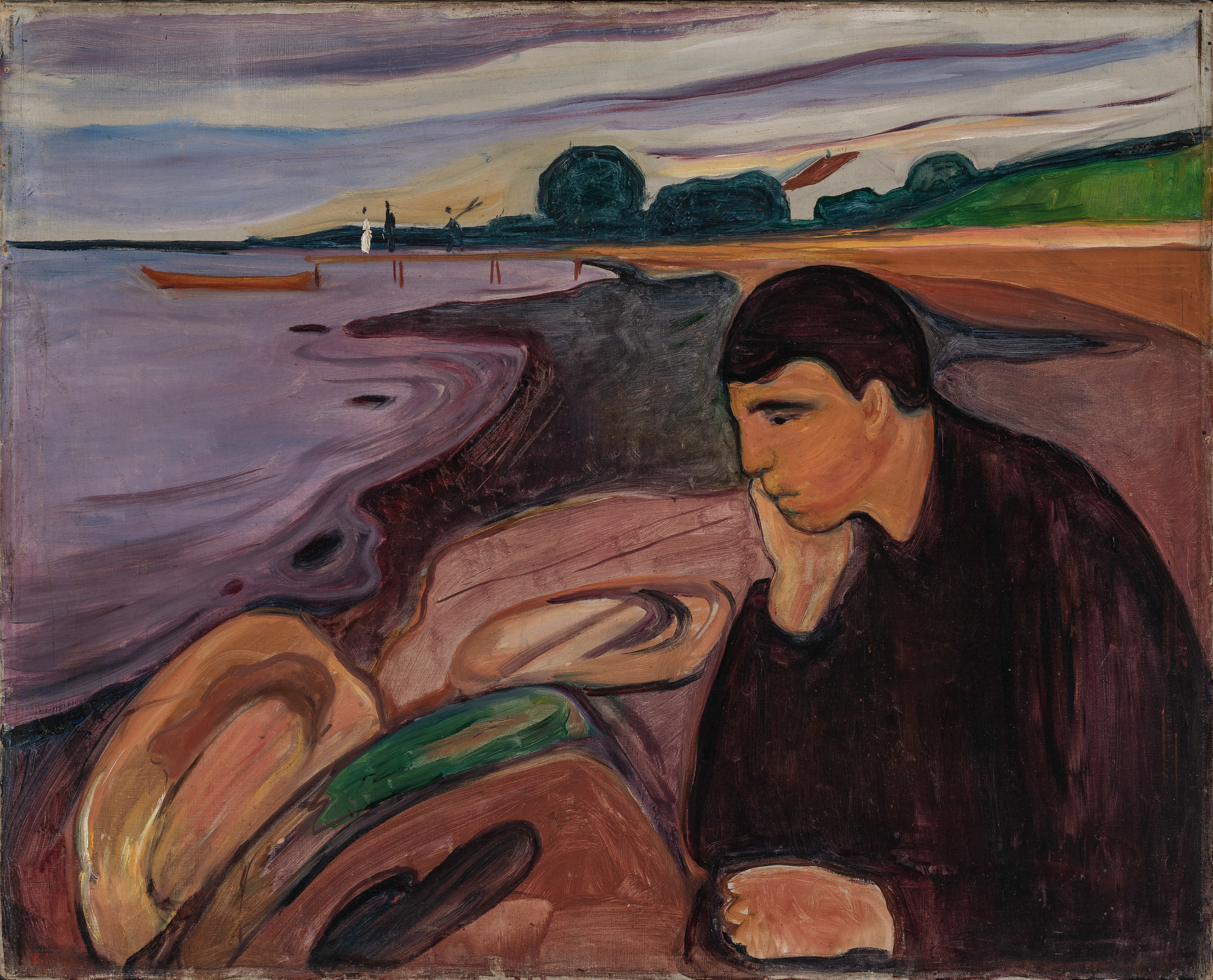
Melancholy, 1894–1896. Oil on canvas. 81 × 100.5 cm. Kunstmuseum Bergen.

== Interpretation ==
Alf Bøe sees Melancholy as a "major personal breakthrough" for Munch. After earlier attempts such as The Sick Child and Night in Saint-Cloud, Munch found in this key work the psychologically intense painting style that became characteristic of his symbolist works of the 1890s. According to Tone Skedsmo and Guido Magnaguagno, Munch's painting primarily expresses a mood. The painter's thoughts and emotions are transferred directly onto the canvas. Nature serves as the vehicle for the mood. From the large, simplified forms to the curved rhythm of the coastline to the dull tone of the color scheme, the composition is completely subject to the creation of a mood.

Hans Dieter Huber analyzes the effect of the colors, from the "greenish-yellow haze of jealousy" to the "snake-like blue-violet" of the shoreline, which connects the melancholic figure to the events on the jetty and seems to "ensnare and capture" him. The yellow boat, which gave the painting one of its alternative titles, also has the color of jealousy, as Christian Krohg pointed out: "Thanks to Munch for making the boat yellow—if it weren't, Munch would not have painted the picture." Shelley Wood Cordulack refers in particular to the unusual black color of the beach, which not only links the black figure in the foreground with the silhouettes of the same color in the background in terms of composition, thus revealing the reason for the melancholic mood, but is also considered color symbolically to be an expression of grief and melancholy.

Ann Temkin, chief curator of painting and sculpture at The Museum of Modern Art (MoMA), says that the smoothness of the beachline is reminiscent of both an inner world of imagination and an external landscape. For Arne Eggum, it symbolizes the loneliness and feeling of emptiness of the melancholic figure in the foreground, whose vision is evoked by the couple on the jetty. Reinhold Heller also sees the couple as a projection of the jealous man. The tension between illusion and reality is reinforced by the visual means used, such as the contrast between spatial depth and two-dimensional forms. Munch himself described in a note around 1894/95: "Jealousy – a long, desolate shore." Ulf Küster recalls the events in the painting in Ibsen's drama Ghosts. Just as Helene Alving in the drama tells of "ghosts" that the audience cannot see, the figure in the foreground of Munch's painting also seems to be communicating the events in the background to the viewer. Munch thus transferred the dramatic device of teichoscopy to painting.

Uwe M. Schneede sees the figure in the foreground as a mediator who breaks up the unity of the pictorial scene. On the one hand, it symbolizes the artist himself and his separation from the events, and on the other hand, it addresses the viewer directly and appeals to his sympathy. Unlike in early 19th-century art, the subject is no longer part of the action and does not form the center of the picture, but is cut off and even turned away at the edge. The three figures on the footbridge belong to another world; they symbolize the classic topos of setting off for an island of love and are bathed in bright, promising colors. What remains is the lonely, isolated individual, denied the happiness of others. Instead, he transforms the conflicts between the inner and outer worlds into a creative process. Melancholy thus already shows the basic constellation of Despair and The Scream, later paintings by the artist in which the rupture between an ego figure and its environment is further elaborated and develops into a "landscape of death". A later variation on the motif, also titled Despair, places the Jappe figure from Melancholy under the red sky of The Scream, which Heller describes as an "additive composition" that loses the intensity and impact of the earlier motifs.

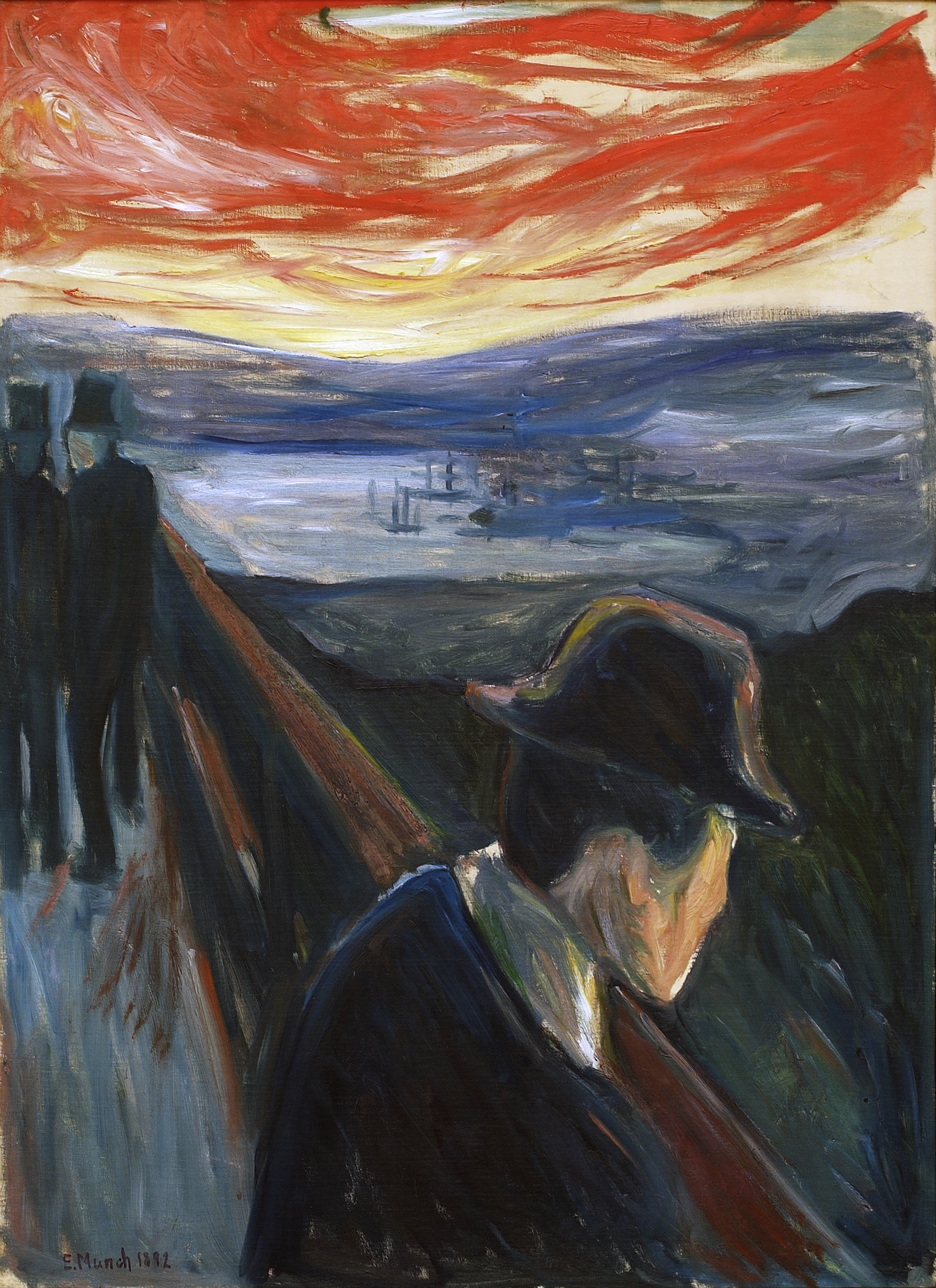
Despair, 1892, 92 × 67 cm, Thiel Gallery, Stockholm.

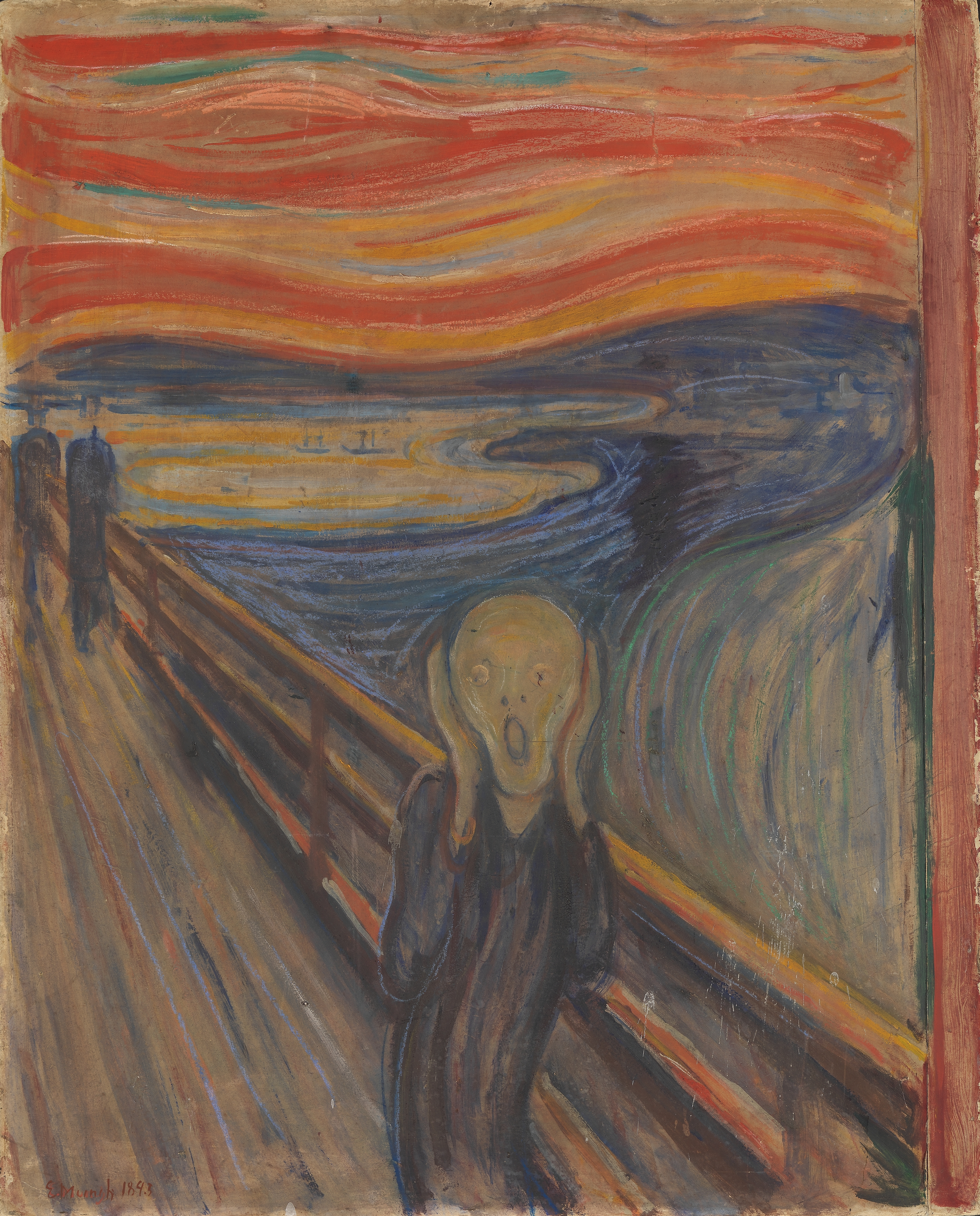
The Scream, 1893, 91 × 73.5 cm, National Museum of Norway, Oslo.

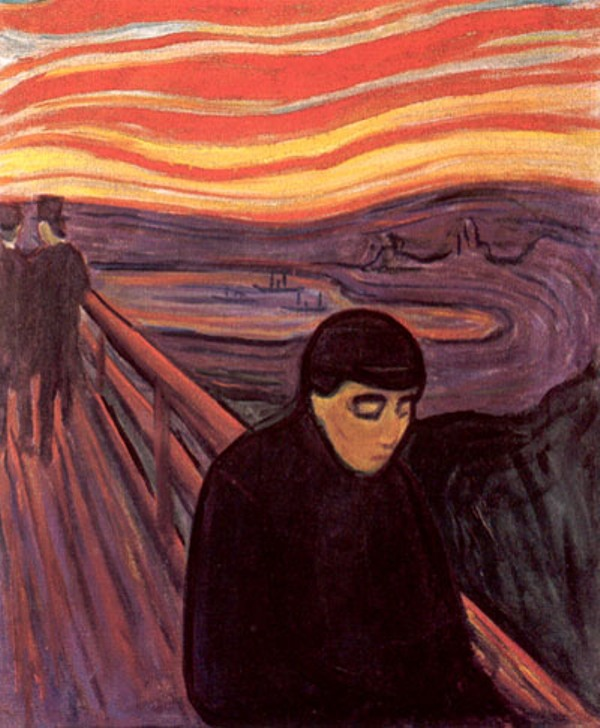
Despair, 1894, 92 × 72.5 cm, Munch Museum, Oslo.

== Background ==
The motif of a melancholic figure in a landscape has a long tradition in art history, dating back to Geertgen tot Sint Jans' John the Baptist in the Wilderness and Albrecht Dürer's Melencolia I. Arne Eggum sees a particular similarity to the etching Night by Max Klinger, who was well known in Kristiania (present day Oslo), and to Paul Gauguin's painting Christ on the Mount of Olives, in which, as in Munch's work, a representative figure expresses the suffering of the painter. Reinhold Heller confirms the connection to a motivic tradition, but rejects a concrete reference to Dürer or Gauguin, since Munch's style was fed less by art-historical models than by his own memories. Thus, the figure sitting on the shore in Munch's work becomes a kind of symbol that has detached itself from the specific occasion in order to express a fundamental human emotion. Precursors to the motif in Munch's work can be found, for example, in the pensive pose of the man at the window at night in Night in Saint-Cloud or the portrait of his sister Inger on the Beach, where nature also becomes a mirror of human emotions. The beach, often in the evening, remains a characteristic feature of Munch's work. Matthias Arnold describes: "People stand alone or in pairs—but even then lonely—on the shore and look out at the sea, this reflection of their soul."

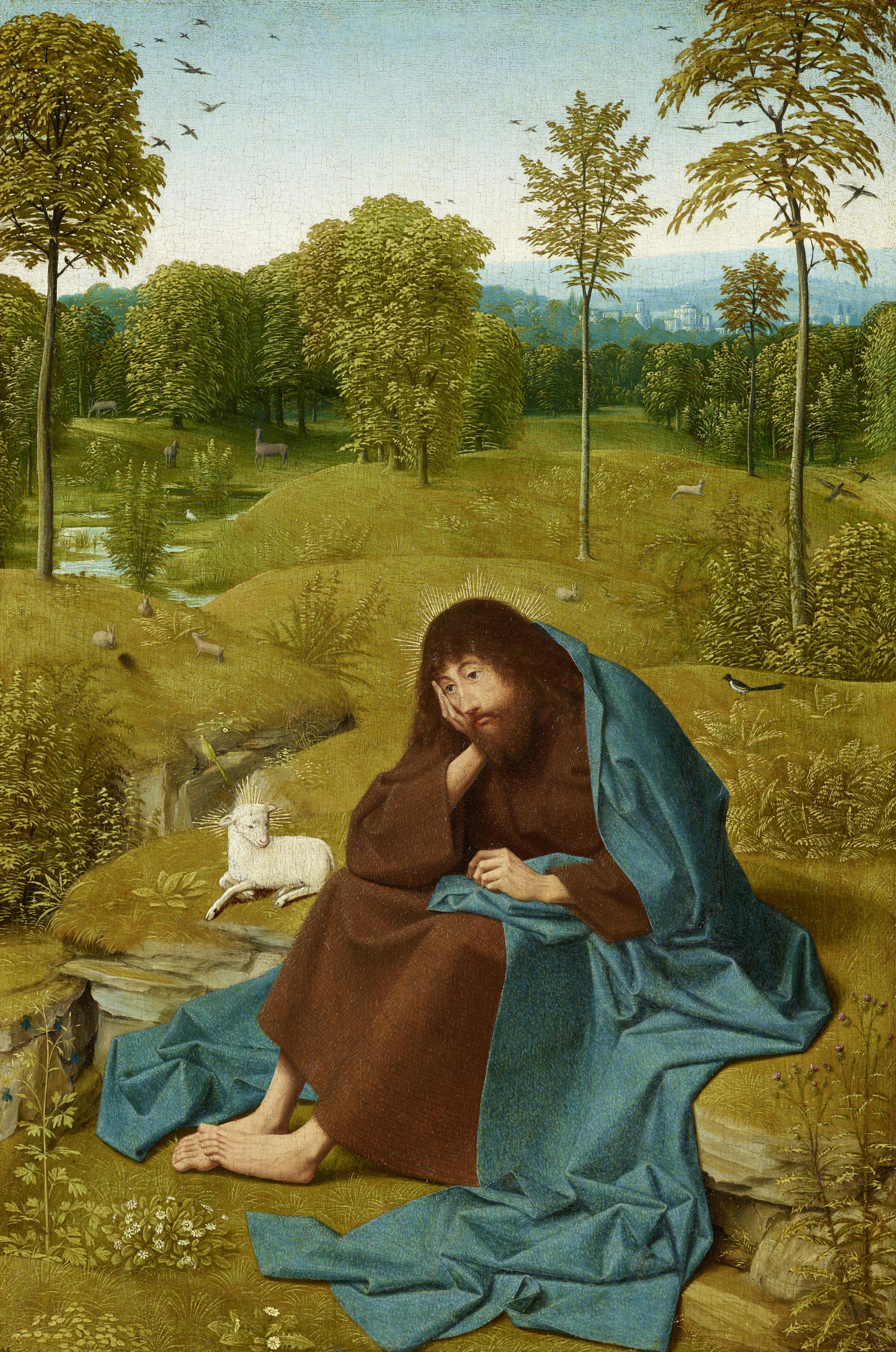
Geertgen tot Sint Jans: John the Baptist in the Wilderness, c. 1490, 41.5 x 27.9 cm, Gemäldegalerie Berlin.

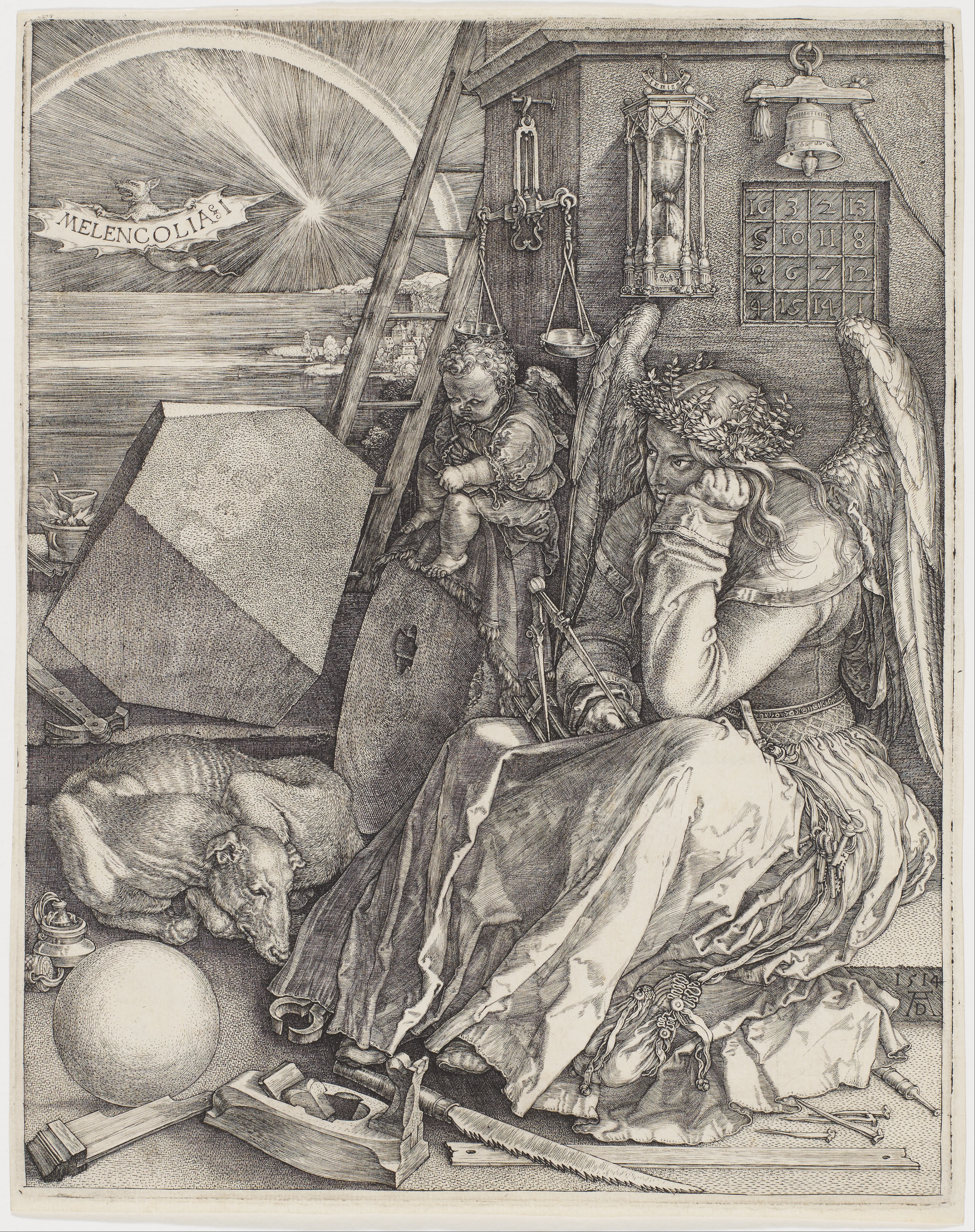
Albrecht Dürer: Melencolia I, 1514.

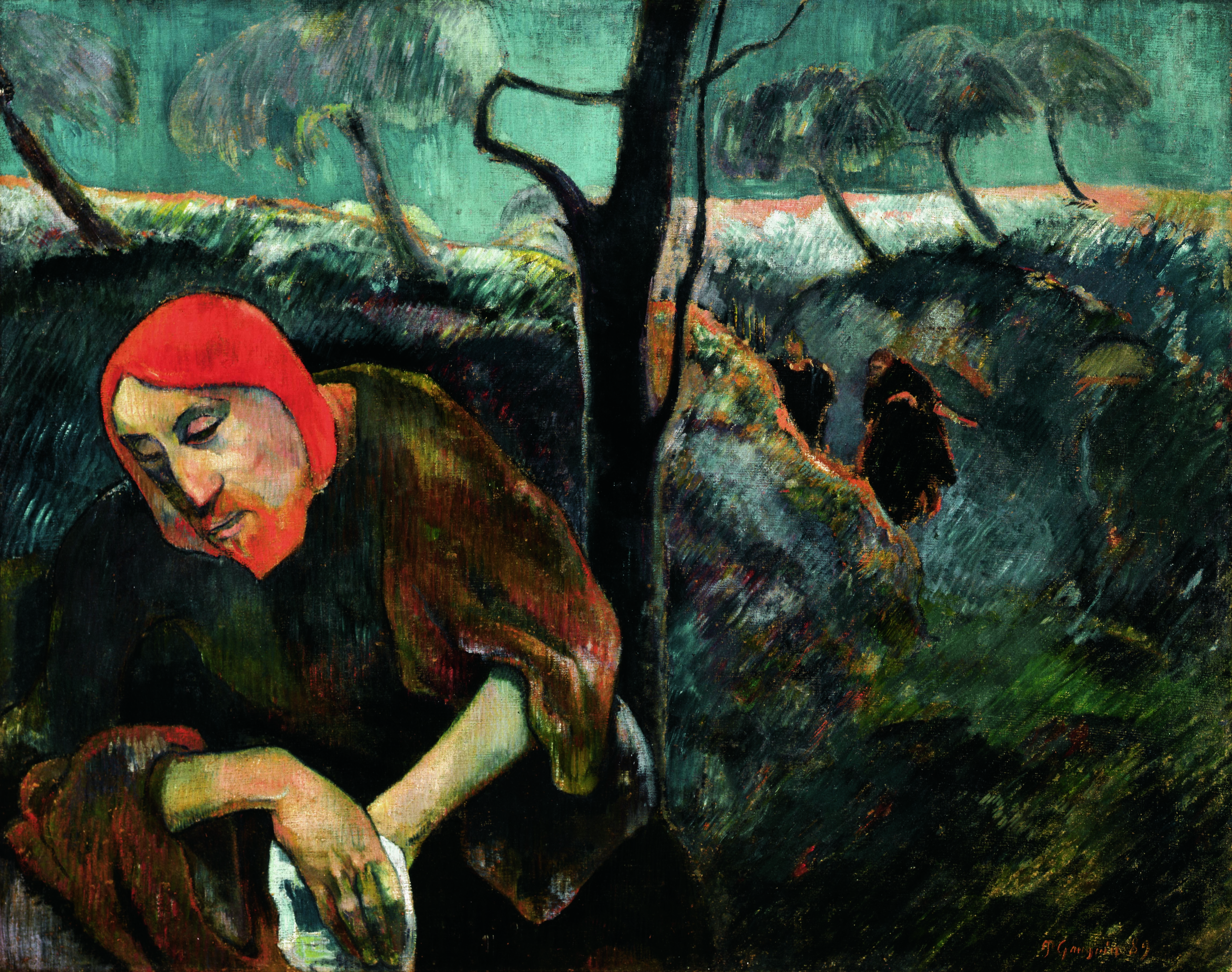
Paul Gauguin: Christ on the Mount of Olives, 1889, 72.4 x 91.4 cm, Norton Museum of Art, West Palm Beach.

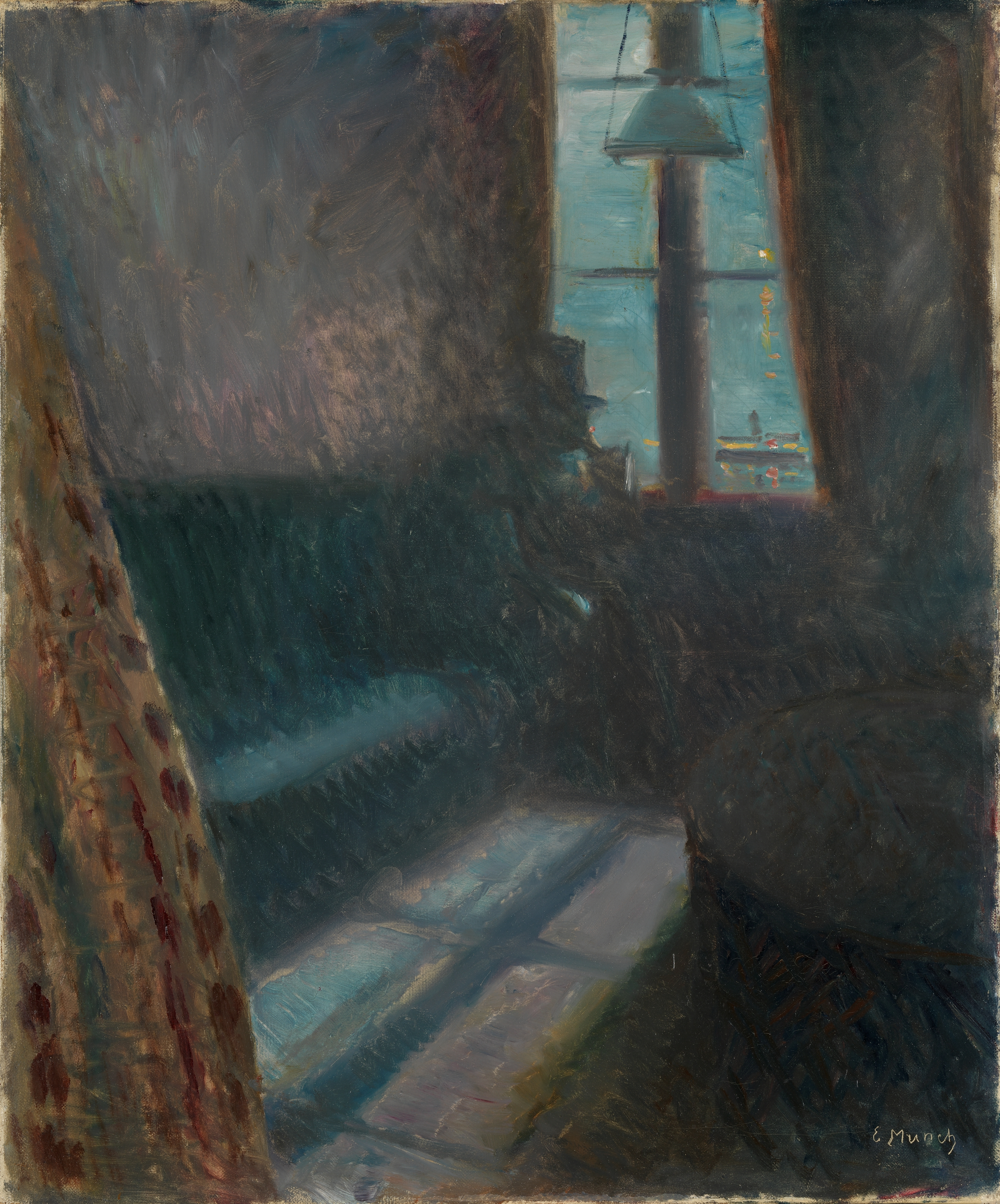
Edvard Munch: Night in Saint-Cloud, 1890, 64.5 x 54 cm, National Museum of Norway, Oslo.

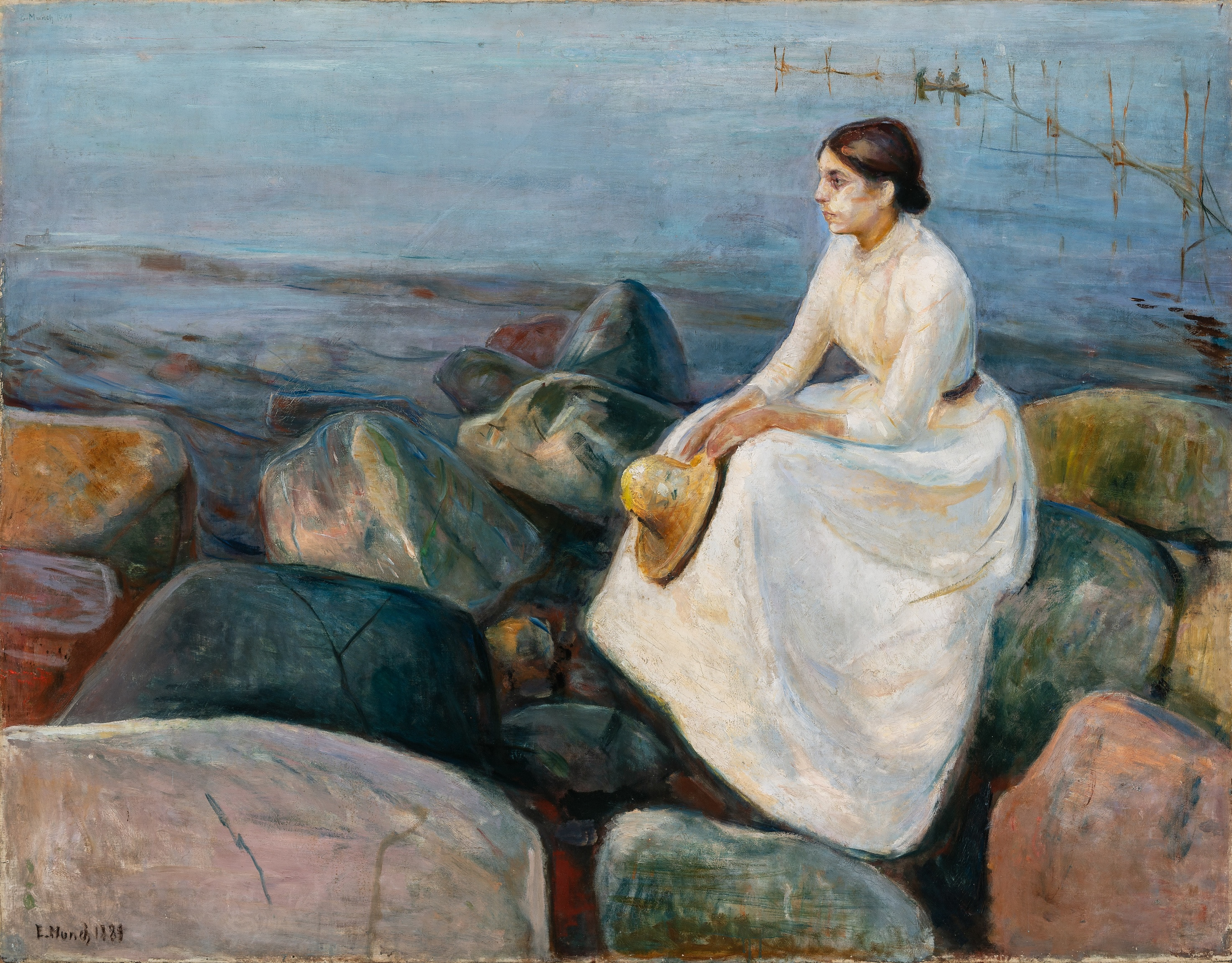
Edvard Munch: Inger on the Beach, 1889, 126 x 161 cm, Kunstmuseum Bergen.

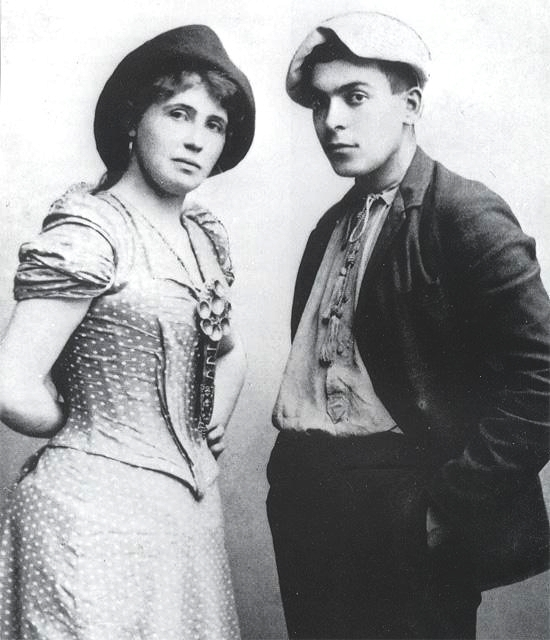
Oda Krohg and Jappe Nilssen in 1891

The specific inspiration for the painting came in the summer of 1891, which Munch traditionally spent in Åsgårdstrand, a small Norwegian coastal town on the Oslofjord that served as a summer retreat for many citizens and artists from nearby Kristiania. Munch's friend Jappe Nilssen and the painter couple Christian and Oda Krohg spent the summer in the same place, and Munch witnessed the unhappy love affair between his 21-year-old friend and the married woman, who was ten years his senior. The relationship awakened memories in Munch of his own, only a few years earlier and equally unhappy, love for Milly Thaulow. Munch had also been 21 years old when, in 1885, he fell in love with the wife of his cousin Carl Thaulow (a brother of the painter Frits Thaulow), a forbidden love that haunted him for a long time and which he processed between 1890 and 1893 in novelistic notes in which he gave his lover the name "Frau Heiberg". At the end of the affair, he declared: "After that, I gave up all hope of being able to love." According to Reinhold Heller, in the summer of 1891 Jappe Nilssen enabled his friend Munch to relive his own experiences a second time and to lend them artistic symbolism. Jappe, portrayed in a melancholic pose, thus becomes an ambiguous figure of identification for the painter himself.

In a prose poem probably written in the early 1890s, Munch captures the mood of the painting in his own words: "It was evening. I was walking along the sea – moonlight between the clouds." A man walks alongside a woman until he realizes that it is an illusion and that the woman is far away. Suddenly, he thinks he recognizes her on a long pier: "a man and a woman – they are now walking out onto the long pier – to the yellow boat – and behind it a man with oars." The gait and movements remind him of the woman, whom he knows is many miles away. "There they go down into the boat – she and he." They sail to an island, and the man imagines them walking there arm in arm, while he remains behind alone. "The boat gets smaller and smaller – the strokes of the oars echo across the surface of the sea – I was alone – the waves glided monotonously up to him – and lapped against the stone – But out there – the island lay smiling in the balmy summer night."

== History ==
During 1891, Munch created a large number of sketches on the theme of "melancholy", varying the position of the person in the foreground and the shoreline. Common to all the sketches was a flat, silhouette-like character, marking a change in style from the influence of Neo-Impressionism during his years in Paris to his future Synthetism and Symbolism. For Reinhold Heller, the number of sketches proves the importance of the motif for Munch, but also his intense struggle to find a new form of expression. For the autumn exhibition in Kristiania in 1891, Munch submitted a first version of Melancholy, then still titled Evening, along with three other works. It is generally assumed that this is the pastel that is now in the Munch Museum. Arne Eggum, on the other hand, suspects that the oil painting dated 1894 from a private collection may have been completed as early as 1891 and submitted for exhibition.

The reactions to Munch's new works were almost universally negative. Erik Werenskiold accused Munch of "leaving his work half-finished, smearing oil and pastel colors together, and leaving huge sections of his canvas completely unpainted, regardless of the atmosphere." Newspaper critics dismissed his paintings as "humorous". Ironically, Christian Krohg, who with his wife had served as the model for the couple on the footbridge, was the only positive voice: "It is an extremely moving picture, solemn and serious—almost religious." Krohg saw a great divide between the Norwegian tradition, to which his own paintings adhered, and Munch's works, which lacked any connection to their common predecessors. Munch's art spoke directly to the soul of the viewer: "He is the only one and the first to commit himself to idealism and dare to make nature, the model, etc., the vehicle for his mood and thus achieve more. Has anyone ever heard such a sound of color as in this painting?"

Munch spent the winter of 1891/92 in Nice on a scholarship, but even here he was far more preoccupied with the impressions he had taken with him from Norway in the summer than with his Mediterranean surroundings. He made his first preliminary sketches for the intense red sky of a sunset, which would later be seen in The Scream. However, Munch spent most of his time once again struggling with the Evening/Melancholy motif, from which he created a vignette for the Danish poet Emanuel Goldstein. Presumably in March 1892, before returning to Norway, Munch created the 1892 painting version based on the sketches for the vignette which passed from the estate of Charlotte and Christian Mustad to the Norwegian National Gallery in 1959, where it has been on display since 1970. Early drafts still showed the figure in profile, as seen in other versions, before Munch painted over it and turned the head downwards out of the painting. It was not until June 1892 that Munch finally completed work on the vignette, which had occupied him for six months.

From the first compilation of his works under the title Study for a Series: Love in 1893, Melancholy became an integral part of the so-called Frieze of Life, a cycle of Munch's central works on the themes of life, love, and death. In 1893, 1894, and 1894 to 1896, he created three further paintings based on the motif. Two woodcuts were created in 1896 and 1902. In Gerd Woll's catalogue raisonné of all of Munch's prints, they are called Evening. Melancholy I and Melancholy III. The two cuts are almost identical. However, only the 1902 version retains the direction of the paintings, while the 1896 version is mirrored. Both woodcuts consist of two separate plates, which were in turn divided to allow for different color applications. Munch experimented with a variety of color combinations in his prints.

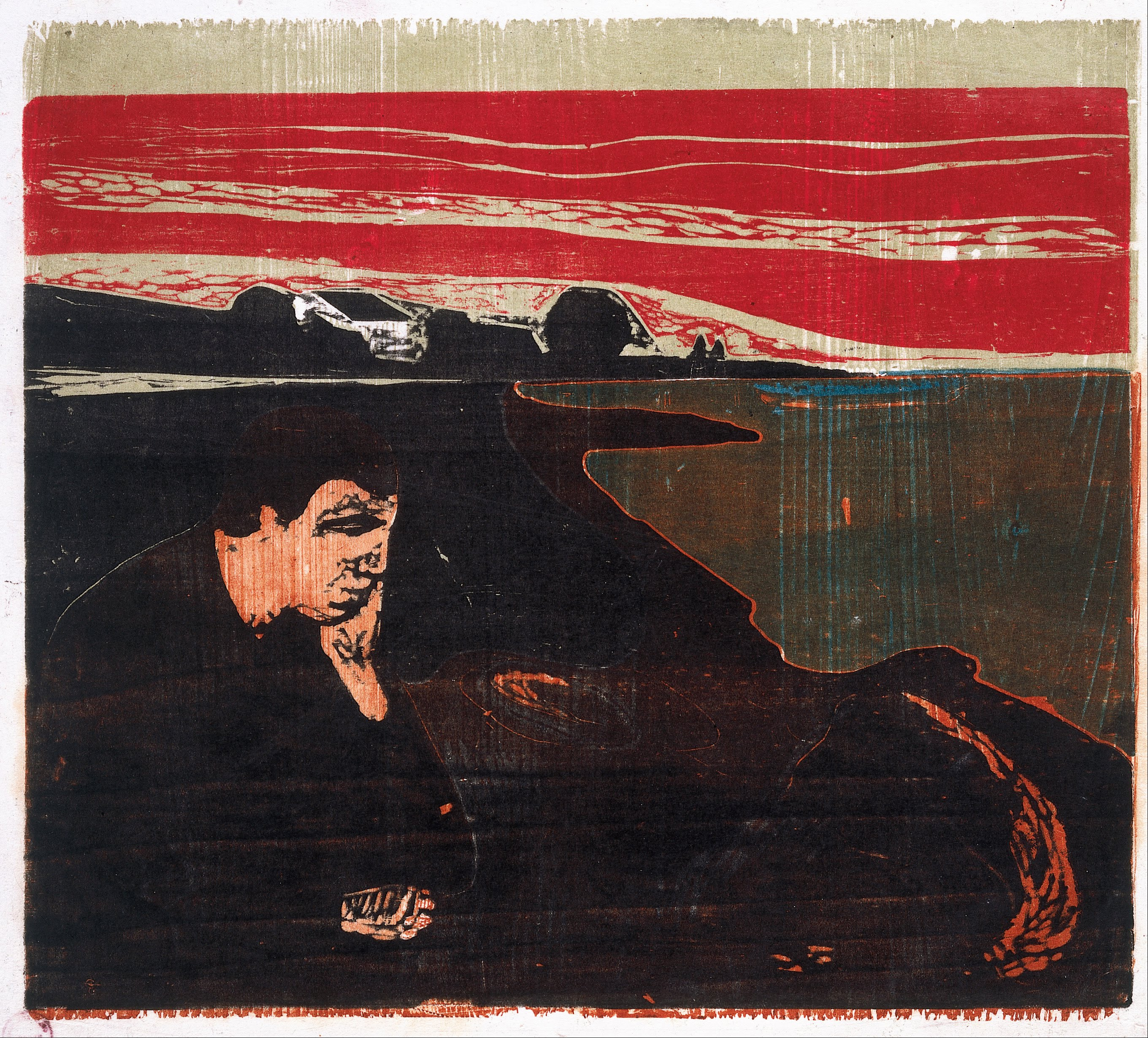
Evening. Melancholy I, 1896. Woodcut. 41.1 × 55.7 cm. Munch Museum, Oslo

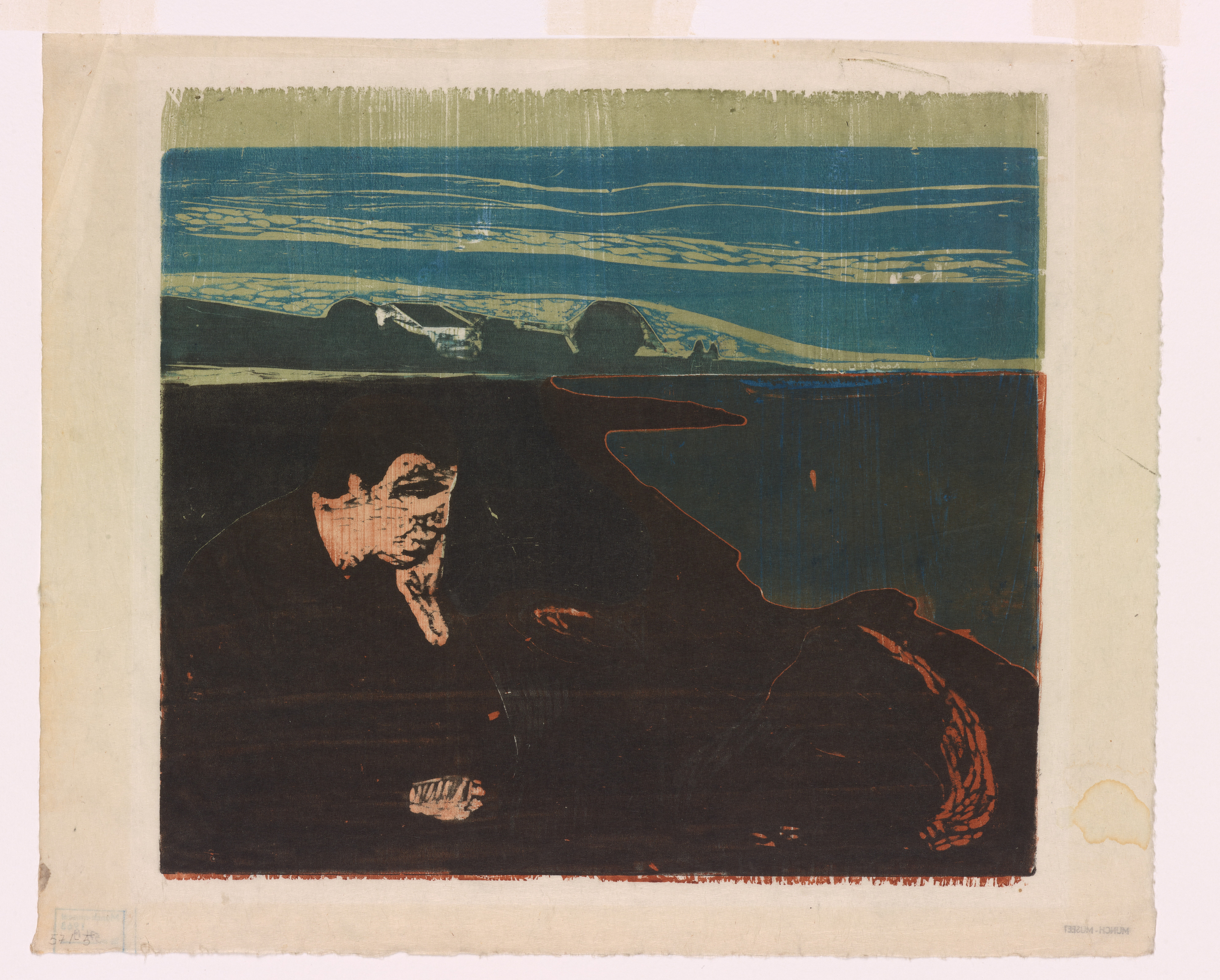
Evening. Melancholy I, 1896. Woodcut. 41 × 55.3 cm, Munch Museum, Oslo

Melancholy III, 1902. Woodcut. 38.7 × 47.8 cm, Thiel Gallery, Stockholm

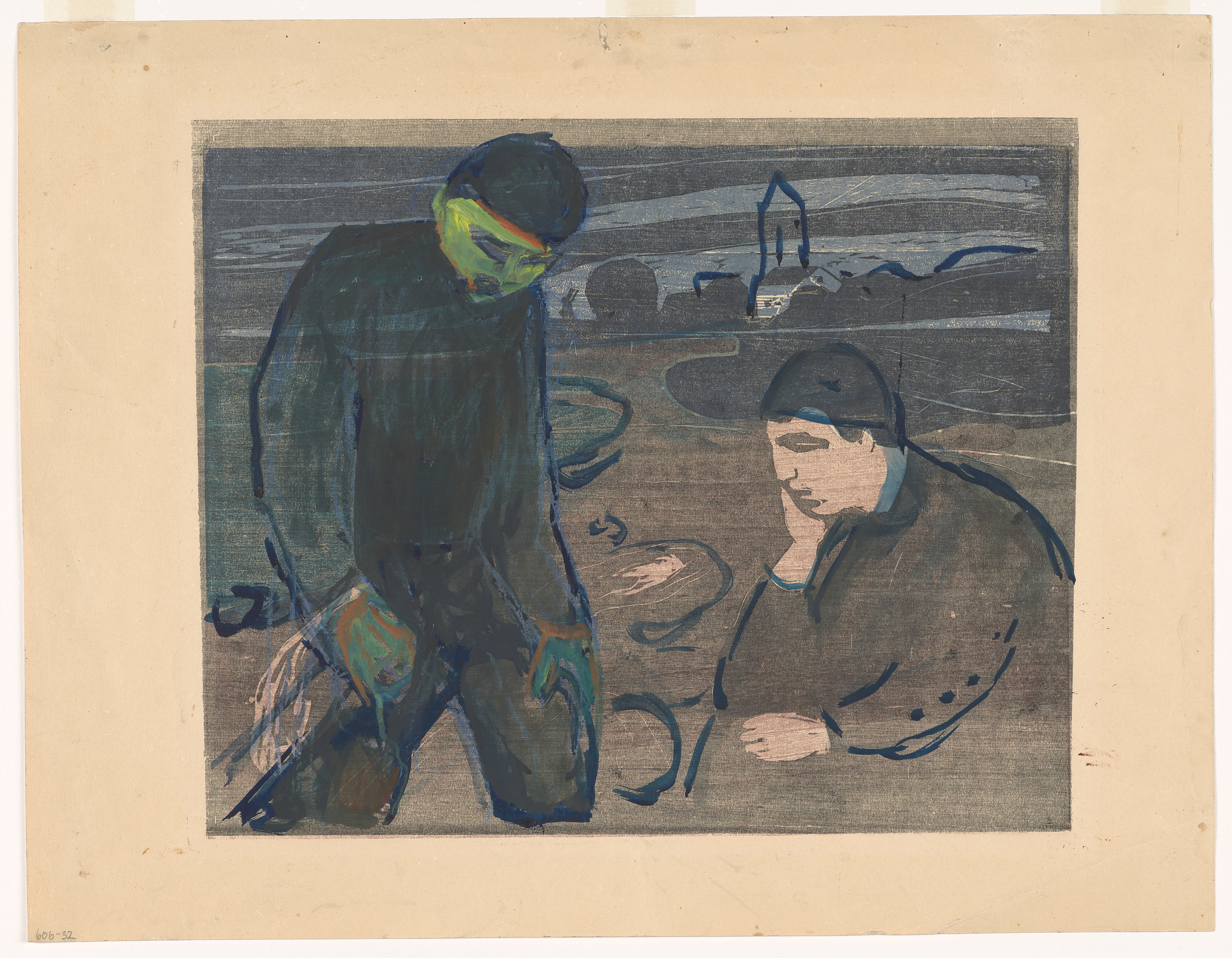
Melancholy III, 1902. Hand-colored Woodcut. 38.8 × 47.9 cm, Munch Museum, Oslo

Munch used the title Melancholy for two further motifs in his later works: the portrait of a crying woman on the beach (for example in the Reinhardt Frieze on display in the Neue Nationalgalerie in Berlin) and a portrait of his sister Laura, who suffered from depression from a young age.

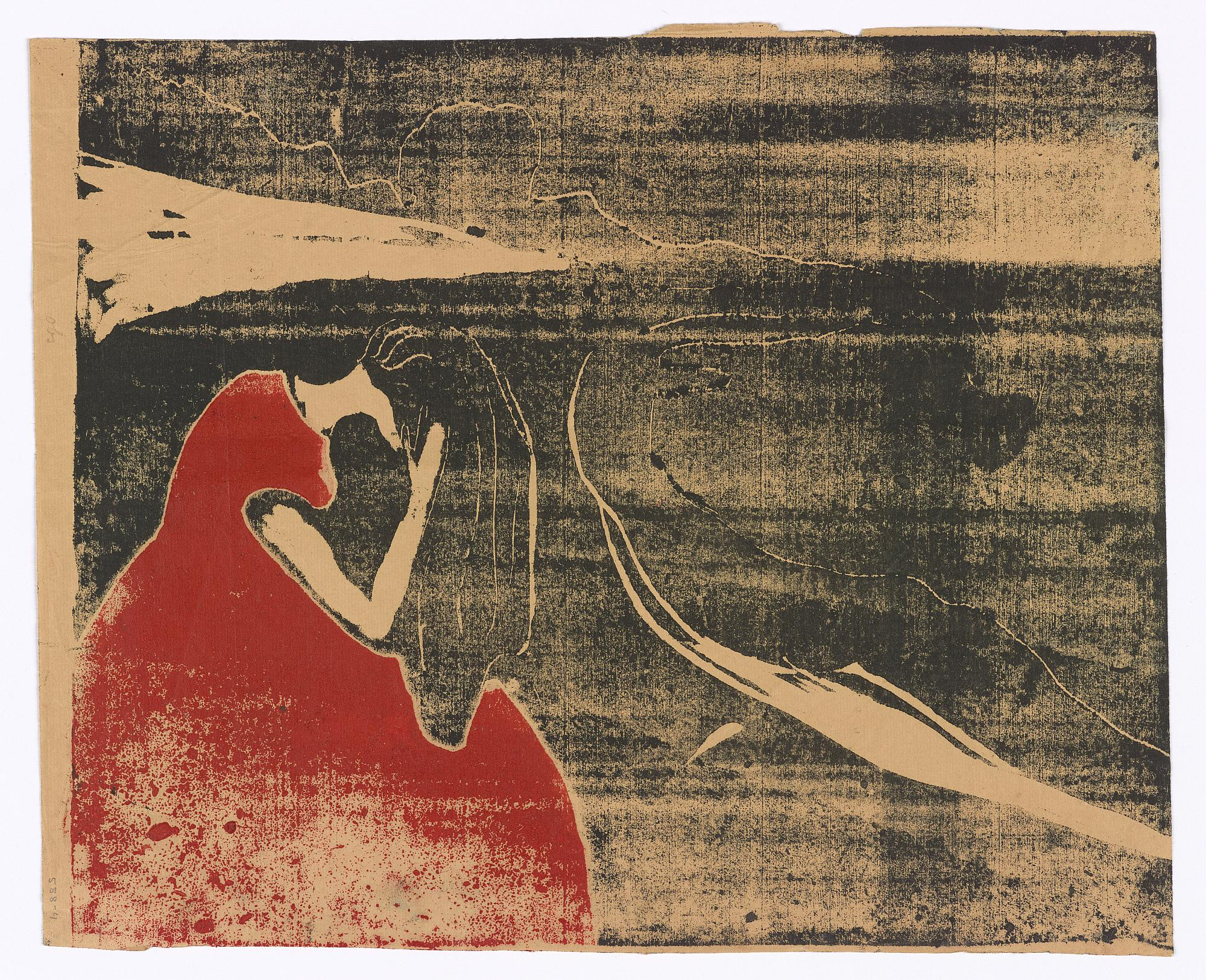
Melancholy II, 1898. Woodcut. 31.8 × 38.4 cm, Munch Museum, Oslo

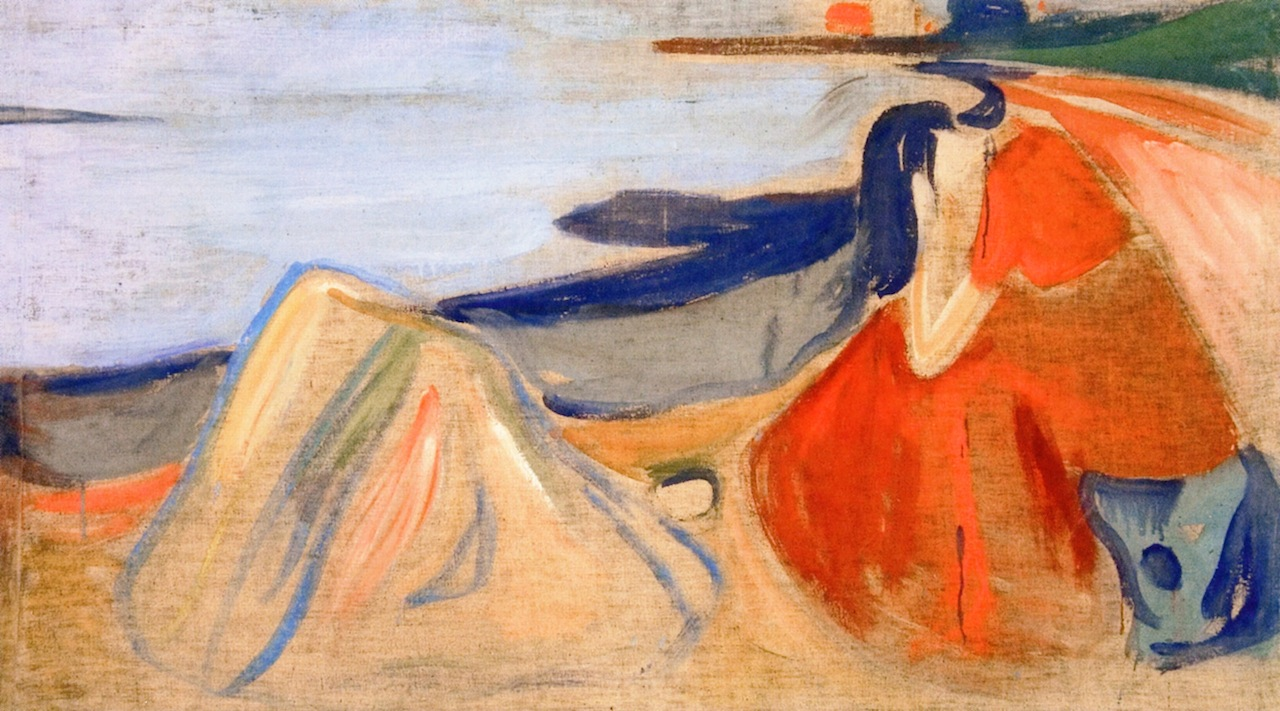
Melancholy (Reinhardt Frieze), 1906–07. Tempera on canvas. 90 × 160 cm, Neue Nationalgalerie, Berlin

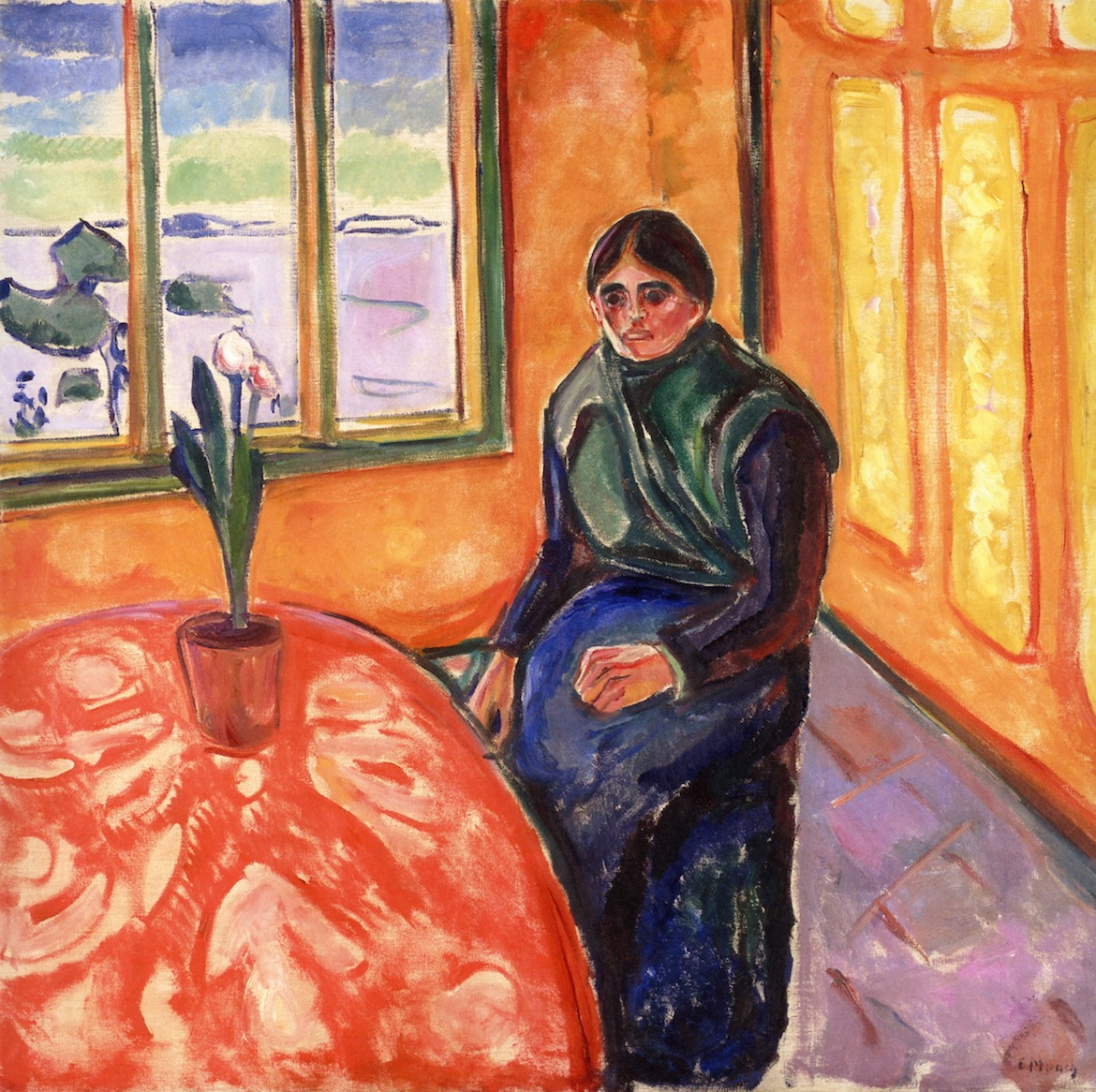
Melancholy, 1911. Oil on canvas, 120 × 125 cm, Stenersen Museum, Oslo

== See also ==
- List of paintings by Edvard Munch
