= Johannes Bergh =

Norwegian barrister

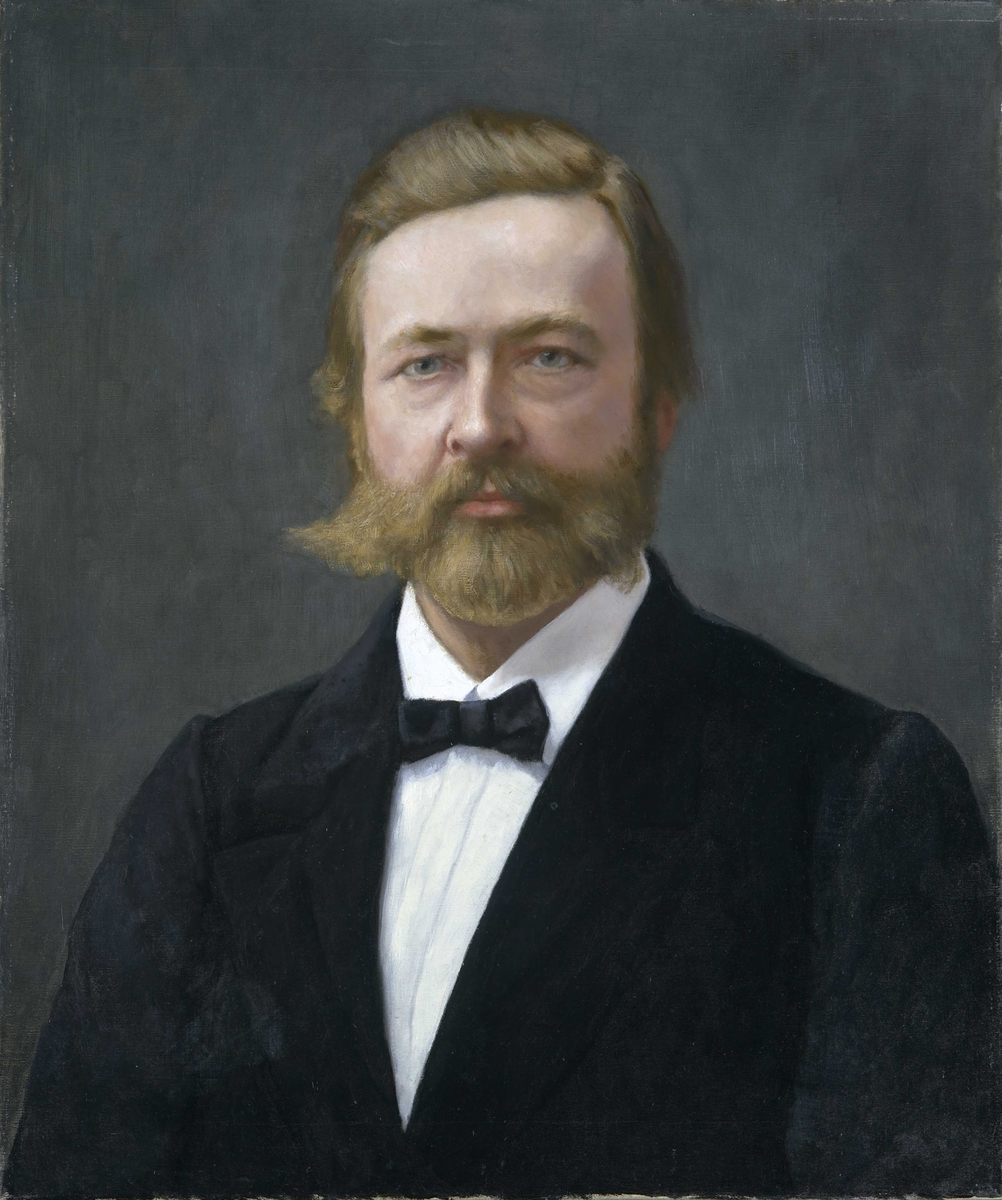
- Born: 18 February 1837; Åsnes
- Died: 8 March 1906 (aged 69)
- Occupation: Barrister
- Known for: Attorney General of Norway
- Children: Ludvig Bergh; Henrik Bergh
- Father: Haagen Ludvig Bergh
- Relatives: Nils Astrup (grandfather)
- Awards: Order of St. Olav (1890, 1894)

Johannes Bergh (18 February 1837 – 8 March 1906) was a Norwegian barrister.

He was born in Åsnes to Haagen Ludvig Bergh and Christine Fredrikke Døderlein. He was married to Anna Johanne Borchgrevink from 1861.

Bergh graduated as cand.jur. in 1856, and was barrister with access to work with the Supreme Court from 1862. He served as Attorney General of Norway from 1893 to 1904. He was decorated Knight, First Class of the Order of St. Olav in 1890, and Commander in 1894.

Civic offices
Preceded by Christian Lasson	Attorney General of Norway; 1893–1904	Succeeded by Karl Lous
