= Christian Lasson =

Norwegian jurist

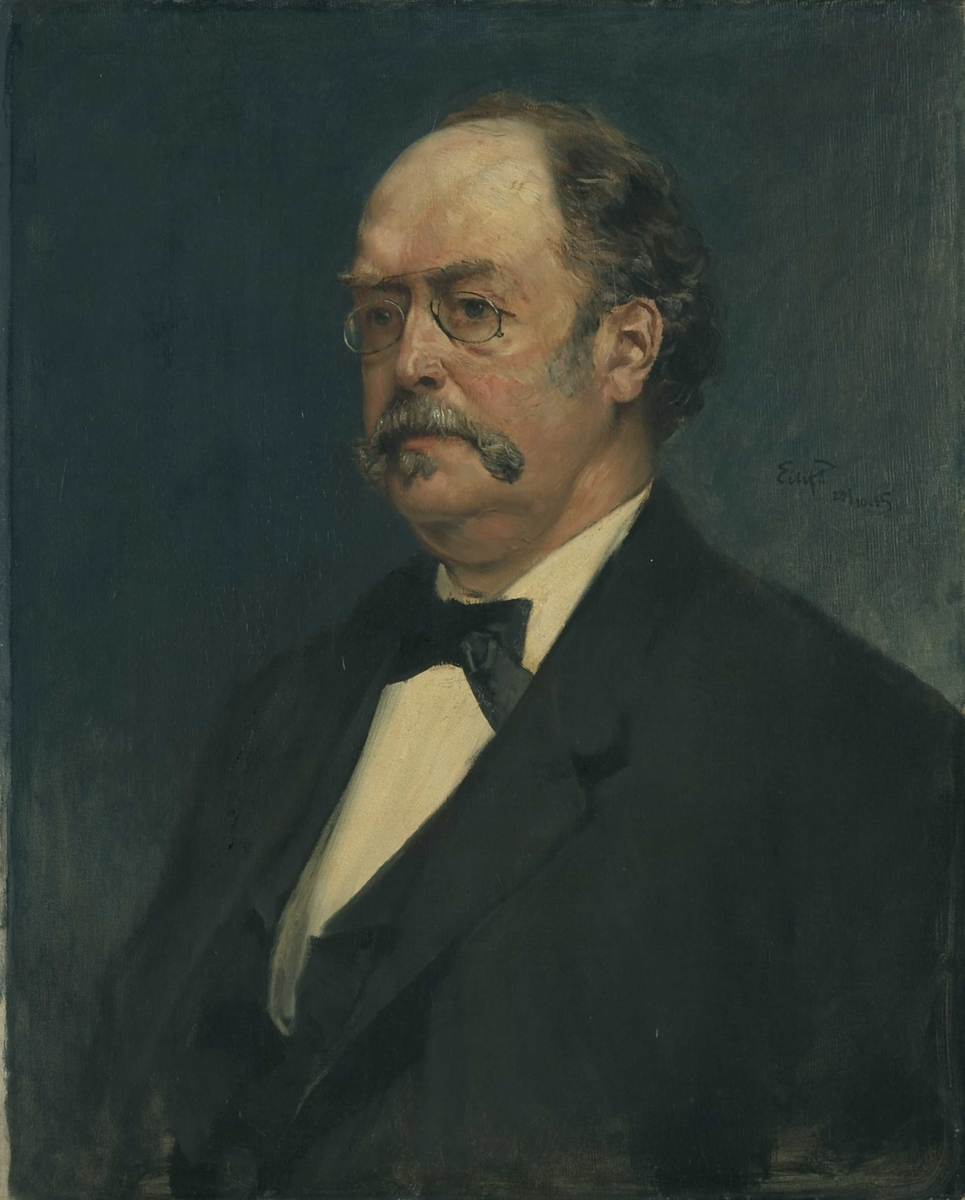
- Lasson portrayed by Eilif Peterssen
- Born: Christian Otto Carl Lasson; 3 July 1830; Christiania
- Died: 7 July 1893 (aged 63)
- Occupation: Barrister
- Known for: Attorney General of Norway
- Spouse: Alexandra Cathrine Henriette von Munthe af Morgenstierne (m. 1857; died 1881)
- Children: 11 (including Per Lasson, Oda Krohg and Bokken Lasson)
- Parent(s): Peder Carl Lasson; Ottilia Pauline Christine von Munthe af Morgenstierne
- Relatives: Bredo Henrik von Munthe af Morgenstierne Sr. (grandfather); Christian Krohg (son-in-law); Per Krohg (grandson); Halfdan Kjerulf (cousin); Frits Thaulow (son-in-law); Holger Drachmann (son-in-law); Vilhelm Dybwad (son-in-law)
- Awards: Order of St. Olav (1885)

Christian Otto Carl Lasson (3 July 1830 – 7 July 1893) was a Norwegian barrister.

== Personal life ==
Lasson was born in Christiania to jurist and politician Peder Carl Lasson (1798-1873) and Ottilia Pauline Christine von Munthe af Morgenstierne (1804-1886). In 1857 he married his cousin Alexandra Cathrine Henriette von Munthe af Morgenstierne (1838-1881). They had eleven children; among them were composer Per Lasson, painter Oda Krohg and singer Bokken Lasson.

== Career ==
Lasson was barrister with access to work with the Supreme Court from 1861. He served as Attorney General of Norway from 1873 to 1893. He was decorated Knight of the Order of St. Olav in 1885.

Legal offices
Preceded by Hans Christian Harboe Grønn	Attorney General of Norway; 1873–1893	Succeeded by Johannes Bergh
