= Hans Christian Harboe Grønn =

Norwegian jurist and politician

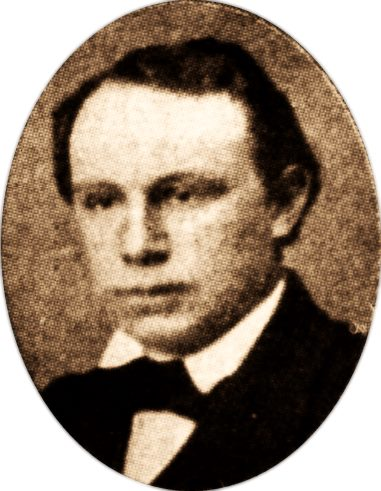
- Born: 9 January 1829
- Died: 18 February 1902 (aged 73)
- Occupation: Barrister
- Known for: Attorney General of Norway

Hans Christian Harboe Grønn (9 January 1829 – 18 February 1902) was a Norwegian barrister and politician.

== Career ==
Grønn was barrister with access to work with the Supreme Court. He served as Attorney General of Norway from 1870 to 1873.

He was elected representative to the Storting from the constituency Kristiania, Hønefos og Kongsvinger for the period 1877–1879.

Legal offices
| Preceded by Bernhard Dunker | Attorney General of Norway; 1870–1873 | Succeeded by Christian Lasson |
