= Jappe Nilssen =

Norwegian writer (1870–1931)

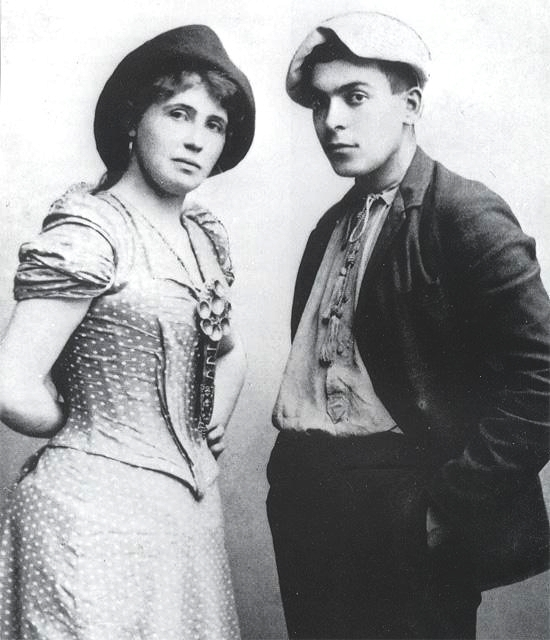
Oda Krohg and Jappe Nilssen, photo from 1891

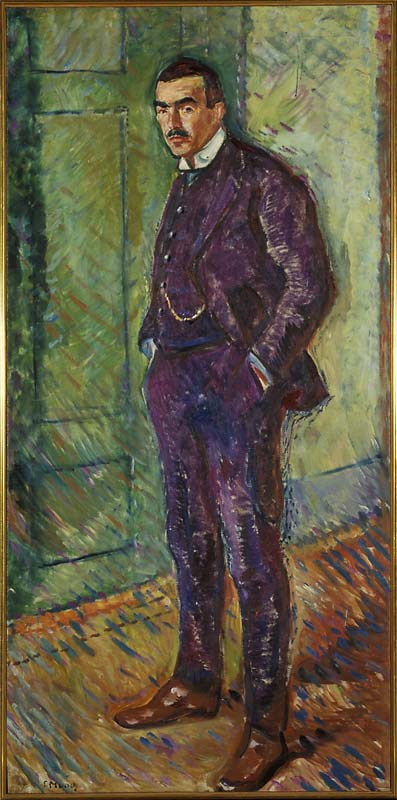
Edvard Munch: Jappe Nilssen (1909)

Jappe Jacob Nilssen (January 25, 1870 – 1931) was a Norwegian writer and art historian.

Nilssen was born in Oslo. He published two novels and a number of novellas, but is mainly known for his many contributions as an art critic to the newspaper Dagbladet. Nilssen was employed by Dagbladet from 1908 until his death. He was close friends with Edvard Munch, Oda Krohg, and Hans Jæger, and he is considered one of the "Kristiania Bohemians." Nilssen was the brother-in-law of the painter Thorolf Holmboe.

Edvard Munch painted a portrait of Nilssen in 1909, and he also created the painting The Physician Lucien Dedichen and Jappe Nilssen in 1925–1926. Both paintings are owned by the Oslo Municipal Art Collection. A drawing by Munch shows Nilssen together with Henrik Ibsen at the Grand Cafe. The painter Ludvig Karsten also created a portrait of Nilssen in 1915.

In 1891, Nilssen is said to have had an affair with Oda Krohg, who was ten years older than him and married to Christian Krohg. Edvard Munch wrote about this unhappy love affair, and it also provided the background for his 1891 painting Melancholy. Nilssen's first novel, Nemesis, describes the young writer Nils Falk, who has an unhappy love affair with a married woman ten years older than him.

In 1909, Jappe Nilssen and the director of the National Gallery, Jens Thiis, arranged an exhibition of 100 paintings and 200 sheets of graphics by Munch. The exhibition was a great success and was very important for Munch's general recognition. At the time, Munch had been admitted to a clinic in Copenhagen following a nervous breakdown.

== Works ==
- Nemesis (Copenhagen: Gyldendalske bokhandlerforlag, 1896), novel
- Solefald (Sunset; Kristiania: Aschehoug, 1903), novel
- Kun én gang vaar: fortælling (Only Once There Was: A Story; Kristiania: Aschehoug, 1904), novella
- Den gamle historie og andre fortællinger (The Old Tale and Other Stories; Kristiania, 1905), collection of novellas
- Faderglæde, og andre fortællinger (A Father's Joy and Other Stories; Kristiania: Aschehoug, 1911), collection of novellas
- Belgisk kunst i Norge (Belgian Art in Norway; Kristiania: Mittet & Co kunstforlag, 1918), folder of loose sheets
