= Per Lasson =

Norwegian composer (1859–1883)

- Born: 18 April 1859; Kristiania, Norway
- Died: 6 June 1883 (aged 24); Norway
- Occupation: Composer
- Notable work: Crescendo!
- Father: Christian Lasson
- Relatives: Oda Krohg (sister); Bokken Lasson (sister); Frits Thaulow (brother-in-law); Holger Drachmann (brother-in-law)

Per Lasson (April 18, 1859 — June 6, 1883) was a Norwegian composer.

== Biography ==
He was born in Kristiania (now Oslo), Norway. He was the son of barrister Christian Lasson (1830–93) and Alexandra Cathrine Henriette von Munthe af Morgenstierne (1838–81). His sisters included painter Oda Krohg (1860–1935) and cabaret singer Bokken Lasson (1871–1970). His sister Alexandra married painter Frits Thaulow, and his sister Soffi married Danish poet Holger Drachmann.

In 1876, he began law studies in Kristiania. In 1882, he developed a malignant tumor in the palate. He was operated on in Norway and Germany but died the following year.

His musical compositions were modest in number, consisting of 15 songs and 9 piano pieces besides an orchestra overture. His most notable composition is the piano solo Crescendo! (1882).
