= Bokken Lasson =

Norwegian singer

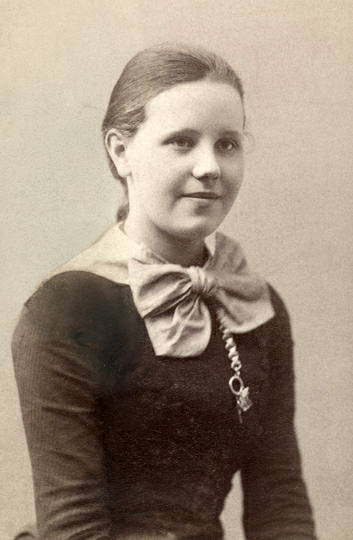
- Bokken Lasson c.1885
- Born: Caroline Lasson; 7 January 1871; Christiania, Norway
- Died: 3 August 1970 (aged 99)
- Occupations: concert and cabaret singer
- Known for: starting the Oslo cabaret Chat Noir in 1912
- Spouses: Michael Semionovitsch Feofanoff (m. 1904; div. 1916) Vilhelm Dybwad (m. 1916; died 1950)
- Parent(s): Christian Lasson; Alexandra Cathrine Henriette von Munthe af Morgenstierne
- Relatives: Per Lasson (brother); Oda Krohg (sister); Peder Carl Lasson (grandfather); Christian Krohg (brother-in-law); Per Krohg (nephew)

Caroline "Bokken" Lasson (7 January 1871 – 3 August 1970) was a Norwegian concert and cabaret singer. She is known for starting the Oslo cabaret Chat Noir in 1912, and also for introducing the children's song "Tuppen og Lillemor" to the Norwegian public.

== Early and personal life ==
Caroline Lasson was born in Christiania as the daughter of lawyer Christian Otto Carl Lasson and Alexandra Cathrine Henriette von Munthe af Morgenstierne. She was a granddaughter of lawyer and politician Peder Carl Lasson, Chief Justice of the Supreme Court of Norway. She was a sister of composer Per Lasson and painter Oda Krohg, and sister-in-law of the painters Christian Krohg and Frits Thaulow. She had a close relation to the Danish writer Holger Drachmann, who later married her sister. She was married to Russian writer Michael Semionovitsch Feofanoff from 1904 to 1916, and to barrister and songwriter Vilhelm Dybwad from 1916. She died in Oslo in 1970, 99 years old.

== Career ==
Lasson took song lessons with Eva Nansen, and later song education in Dresden. She made her concert debut in 1894, at Brødrene Hals' concert house in Kristiania. She started touring in 1895, visiting many European cities, singing while accompanying herself playing lute. She advanced from street singer to performing at cabarets and restaurants, and occasionally in musical comedies and plays, including performances at the Königliche Hoftheater in Stuttgart. After several years of touring she settled in Kristiania, where she had singing roles at musical comedies at Centraltheatret and Fahlstrøms Teater. In 1912, together with her later husband Vilhelm Dybwad, Lasson started the cabaret Chat Noir in Oslo, modelled after the Paris cabaret Le Chat Noir. Vilhelm Dybwad wrote songs for the cabaret, and her nephew Per Krohg made the first stage decorations. To start with, Chat Noir was a literary cabaret, and among its contributors were the poets Herman Wildenvey and Arnulf Øverland. Bokken Lasson chaired the Chat Noir until 1917, and the cabaret has lasted until today, more than hundred years. She made her first song recording in 1912, the songs "Tuppen og Lillemor" and "Det lille Vandspand". The 1912 recording of "Tuppen og Lillemor" is also found on the 1983 album Chat Noir og norsk revyhistorie. In the late 1920s, she started the Cabaret Intime, where she performed herself, along with other musicians such as Kirsten Flagstad, Maja Flagstad, Cally Monrad and Lalla Carlsen. Bokken Lasson was interested in antroposophy, educated at the Steiner school, was an active song educator, and continued her song career by giving concerts and being guest artist in musical comedies. She has published song books and autobiographical books.

In 1962 a bronze statue of her was revealed in Homansbyen in Oslo, sculptured by Joseph Grimeland.

== Select bibliography ==
- 67 viser fra det gamle Chat Noir, 1920
- Østens smil og tårer, 1931
- Slik var det dengang, 1938
- Livet og lykken, 1940
- Bokken Lassons jubileumsalbum, 1947

== Selected recordings ==
- "Tuppen og Lillemor" (1912)
- "Det lille Vandspand" (1912)
- "Maisangen" (1912)
- "Sorte øine" (1912)
- "Dukkerne" (1913)
- "O du søde glade jul" (1913)
- "Pierrot henter månen" (1913)
- "Hvor meget må man tjene" (1957)
- "Våren i Kristiania" (1957)
