= Haagen Ludvig Bergh =

Norwegian politician

Haagen Ludvig Bergh (24 February 1809 – 12 October 1863) was a Norwegian politician.

He was elected to the Norwegian Parliament in 1845, representing the constituency of Hedemarkens Amt. He worked as a chaplain there, but was eventually promoted to vicar (sogneprest). He was later re-elected in 1848, 1851, 1854, 1857, 1859 and 1862, the last two terms for the constituency of Smaalenenes Amt.

He was married to Anne Marie Louise Astrup (1822–1888), daughter of politician Nils Astrup. The couple had one son and one daughter.
