= Joseph Grimeland =

Norwegian sculptor

Joseph Grimeland (2 January 1916 – 10 October 2002) was a Norwegian sculptor.

== Biography ==
Grimeland was born in Kristiania (now Oslo), Norway. He was the son of Bertel Andreas Grimeland (1875–1966) and Margaret Thomas (1889–1963). He attended private school at Grimelandskolen in Asker which his father had founded and where he served as head master. In 1933, he entered the Norwegian National Academy of Fine Arts (Statens kunstakademi) where he had Wilhelm Rasmussen as an instructor. He debuted at the Autumn Exhibition (Høstutstillingen) in 1935.

Among his sculptures were Naken gutt from 1939 at the National Gallery of Norway and Oslopiken from 1951 at the Oslo City Hall. After the end of German occupation of Norway during World War II, he designed a number of war memorial. In 1946, he created a war monument (Krigsminnesmerket) in granite at Nordre Skøyen in Oslo. In 1980, his monument to Norwegian ships and sailors (Krigsseilermonumentet) was unveiled at Bygdøy peninsula in the district of Frogner of Oslo.

During the course of his career, he portrayed Hieronymus Heyerdahl (1950), Ole Reistad (1958), Bokken Lasson (1962), Anders Jahre (1975), Sigrid Undset (1977), Kirsten Flagstad (1981), Arnulf Øverland (1968) and Olaf Bull (1989). He also made stage decorations for Nationaltheatret. He chaired the Norwegian Sculptors' Association from 1974 to 1978.

== Honors ==
- King's Medal of Merit (Kongens fortjenstmedalje) in gold (1950)
- Order of St. Olav (1993)
- Ingeborg og Per Palle Storms ærespris (1997)

== Other sources ==
- Stig Andersen, Odd Nerdrum, Per Ung (1996) Joseph Grimeland (Oslo: Gyldendal) ISBN 9788205234451

== Related reading ==
- Grimeland, Joseph; Øistein Thurmann-Nielsen (1965) Moderne kunst - hvorhen? (Oslo Dreyer)
