= John the Baptist in the Wilderness =

Painting by Geertgen tot Sint Jans

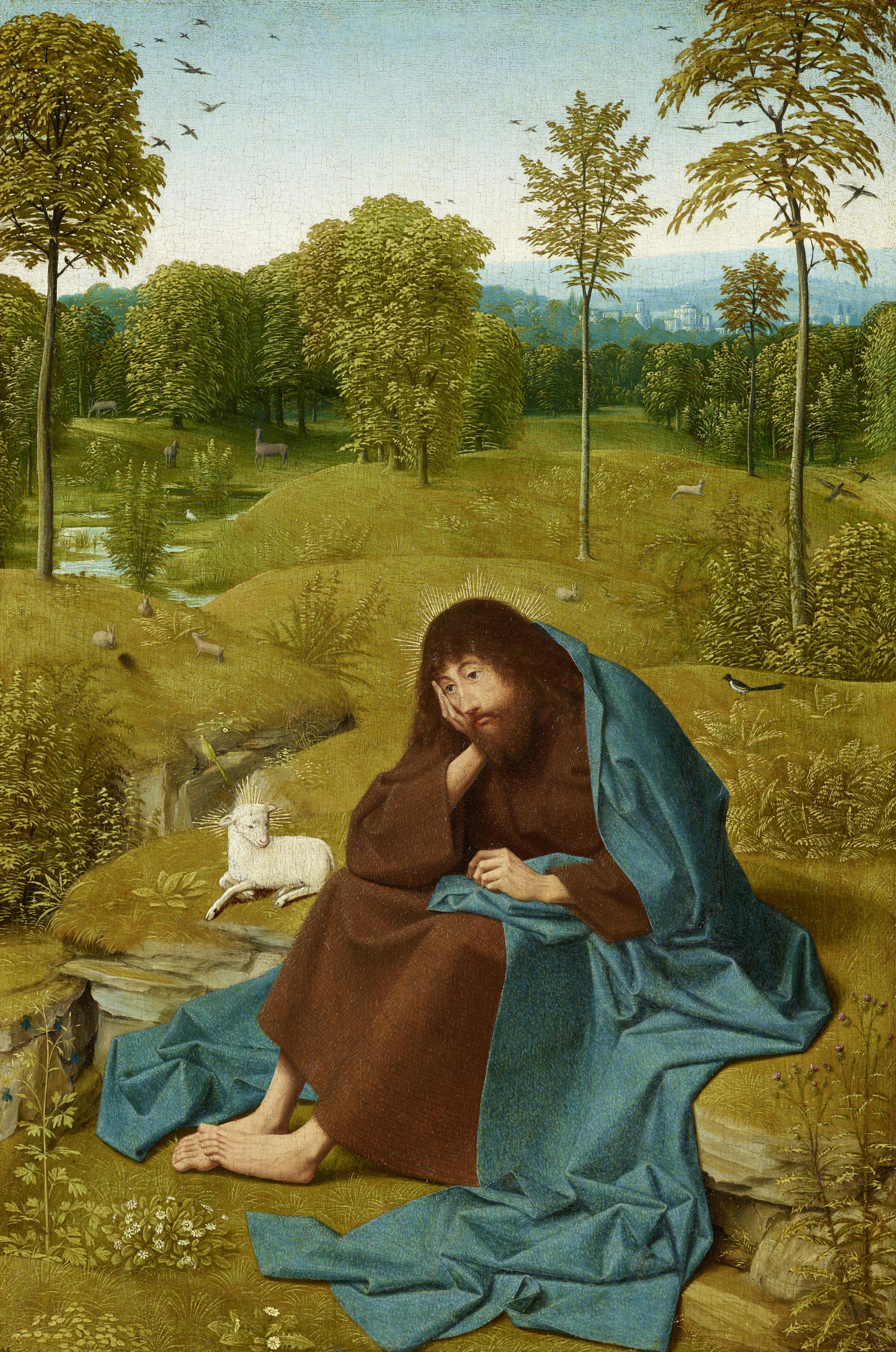
- Artist: Geertgen tot Sint Jans
- Year: 1480s
- Medium: oil on oak panel
- Dimensions: 41.5 cm × 27.9 cm (16.3 in × 11.0 in)
- Location: Gemäldegalerie, Berlin

John the Baptist in the Wilderness is a painting by Geertgen tot Sint Jans, made ca. 1480-1490. It is in the collection of the Gemäldegalerie, in Berlin. It was a meditation aid for pilgrims.

== History ==
It is not known when the panel was painted. Due to the similarity in style and execution with two panels that are certain to be by Geertgen, this panel is also attributed to him. These two panels are often dated around 1485, so that this period has also been proposed for this painting. The panel may subsequently be mentioned in 17th-century documents as a painting that was in the monastery of the Jansheren in Haarlem, but there is no further documentation from a later date. It resurfaces at the end of the 19th century, when it is in the possession of the English painter Charles West Cope. Initially it was believed to be a painting by Joachim Patinir, until it was attributed to Geertgen in 1902.

== Description ==
John the Baptist is the focal point in the painting, with a lamb by his side, in a kind of Garden of Eden setting.

The panel depicts John the Baptist, recognizable by his attribute, the lamb of God. John is in the wilderness, where he preached, according to the Gospel of Matthew (3:1-6). The brown garment, that according to Matthew was made of camel's hair, that John wears on the panel also refers the Gospel. However, the fact that John isolated himself in solitude and seems lost in his thoughts, as in the painting, are not stated in the Gospels. This element may have been inspired by the belief that John was a kind of forerunner of hermits (monks who live in seclusion), like for example in the Vita Christi, by Ludolph of Saxony.

John's feet are a special detail: they are possibly just a vivid representation of someone deeply in thought, but it has been suggested that the slightly crossed feet may refer to the crucifixion of Jesus or the Last Judgment.
