= Oda Krohg =

Norwegian artist (1860–1935)

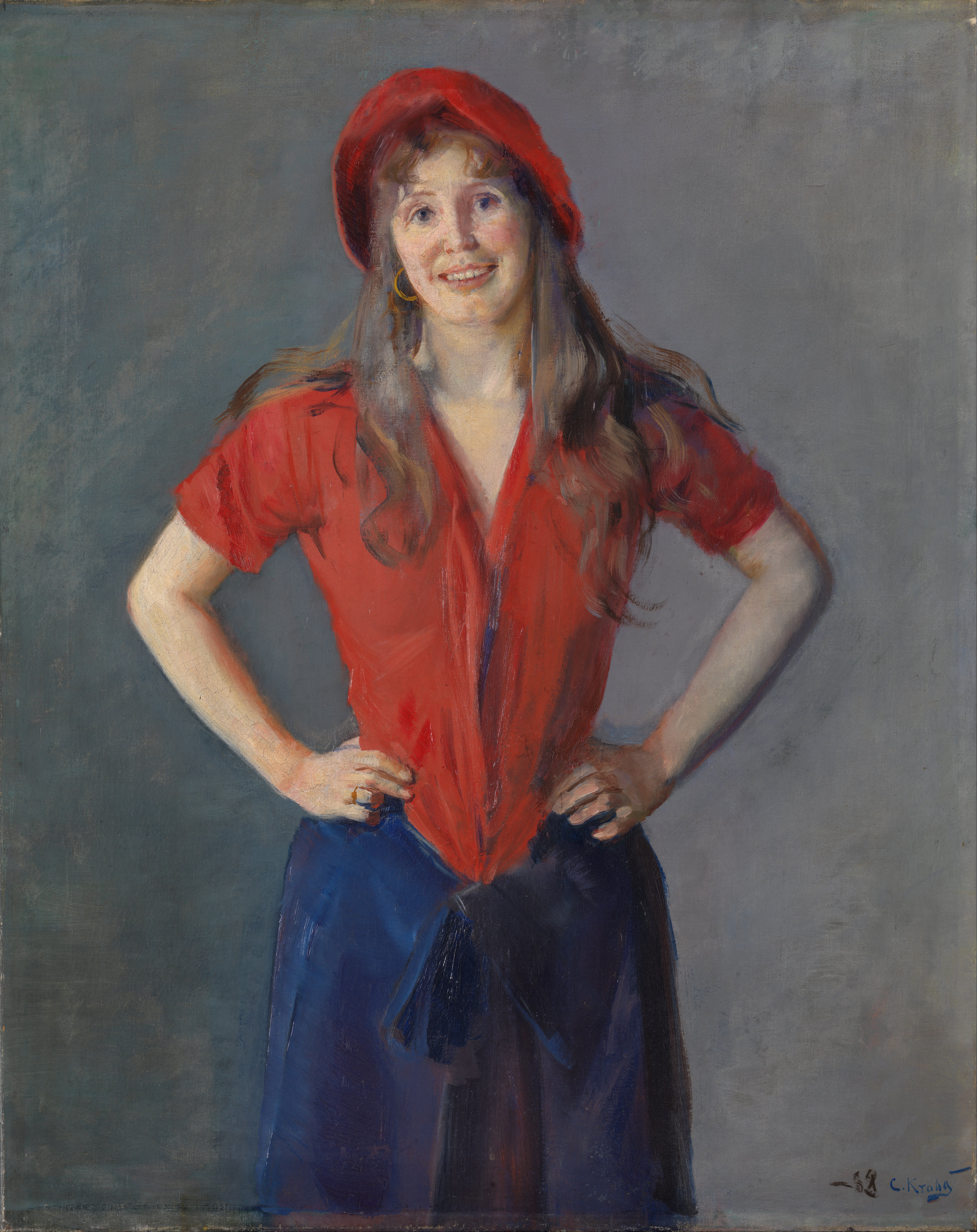
- Oda Krohg as Bohemian Princess, painted by husband Christian Krohg in 1886
- Born: Othilia Pauline Christine Lasson; 11 June 1860; Åsgårdstrand, Norway
- Died: 19 October 1935 (aged 75); Oslo, Norway
- Known for: Painting
- Spouses: Jørgen Engelhardt (m. 1881; div. 1888) Christian Krohg (m. 1888; died 1925)
- Children: 4, including Per
- Father: Christian Lasson
- Relatives: Per Lasson (brother); Bokken Lasson (sister); Peder Carl Lasson (grandfather)

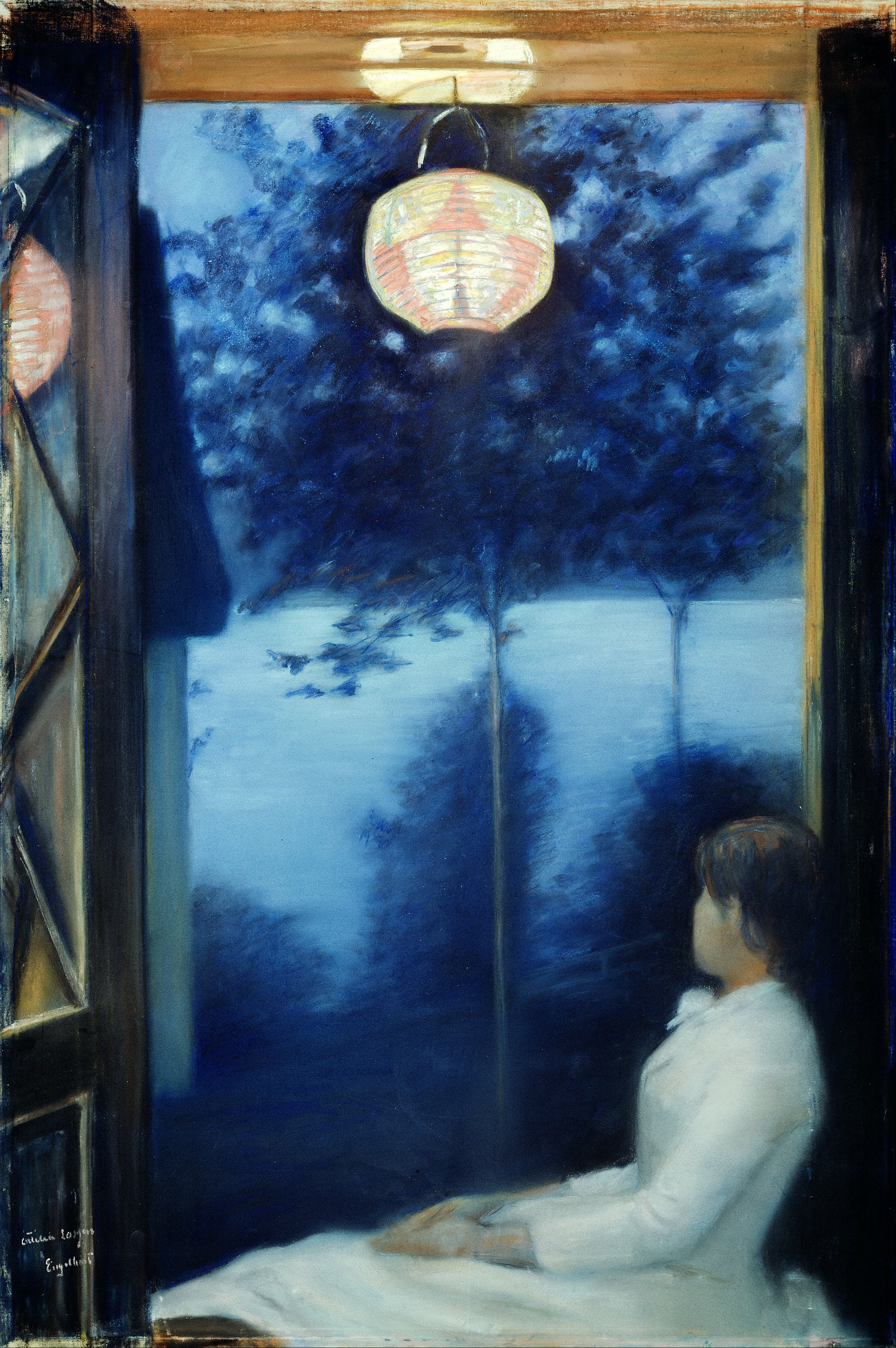
Debut work By the Oslofjord (Japanese lantern), 1886

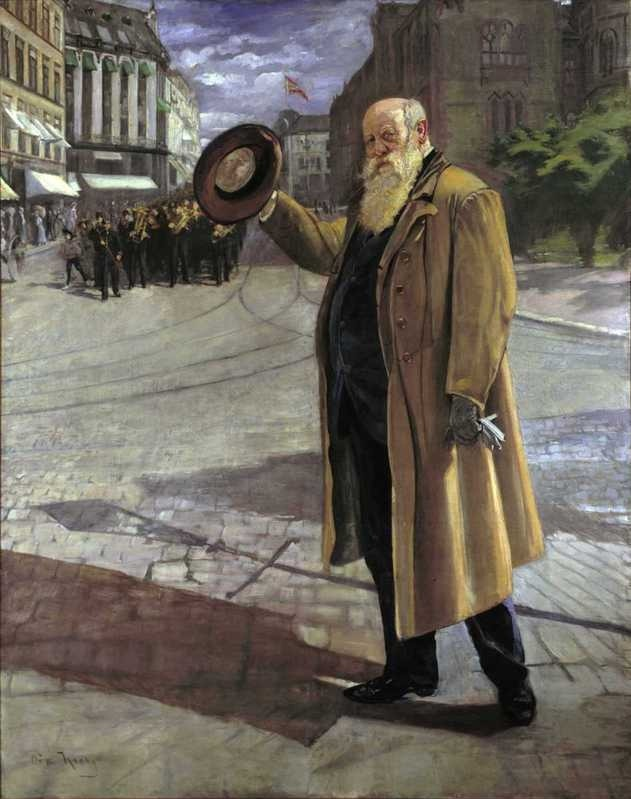
Portrait of the painter Christian Krohg

Oda Krohg (born Othilia Pauline Christine Lasson; 11 June 1860 – 19 October 1935) was a Norwegian painter, and the wife of her teacher and colleague Christian Krohg.

== Biography ==
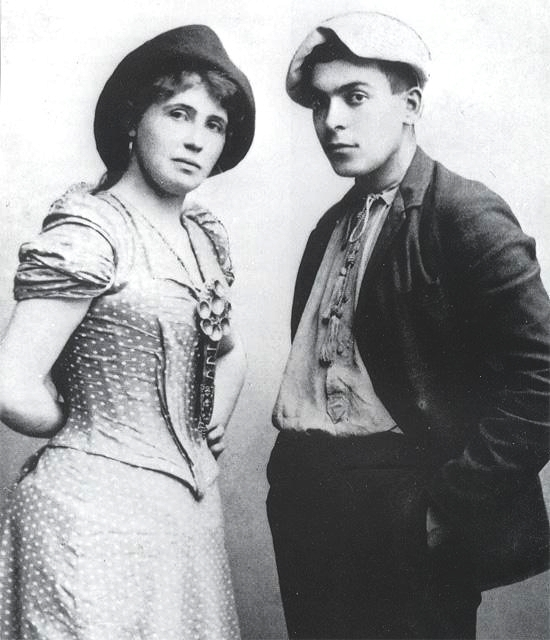
Oda with friend and lover, the poet Jappe Nilssen, in 1891

She was the second daughter of public attorney Christian Lasson and Alexandra Cathrine Henriette von Munthe af Morgenstierne. Her maternal grandmother Anastasia Sergeyevna Saltykova was a member of the Russian princely Saltykov that belonged to the high nobility; other members of this family were Field Marshal Prince Nikolai Saltykov and Catherine the Great's lover Sergei Saltykov. She grew up in a liberal-conservative household, along with eight sisters and two brothers. Her brother Per Lasson became a noted composer and her sister Caroline "Bokken" Lasson a singer and writer.

In 1881 she married the businessman Jørgen Engelhardt (1852–1921), with whom she had two children. She split from Engelhardt in 1883, and divorced him in 1888. In 1885 she became a student of Erik Werenskiold and Christian Krohg, the latter she would marry in October 1888. In 1885, their daughter Nana was born, and in 1889, their son Per, who also would be a notable painter.

=== Paris ===
In the period 1901–1909, the family lived in Paris. In Edvard Munch's etching kafeinteriør (1893), Oda is surrounded by bohemians and people close to them: Munch, Christian Krohg, Jappe Nilssen, Hans Jæger, Gunnar Heiberg and Jørgen Engelhardt. Oda is said to have had affairs with all of these men apart from Munch. In his book Syk Kjærlihet ("Diseased Love", 1893), Hans Jæger describes a love triangle where he was strongly in love with a woman who was to marry a painter. Oda is said to have been the model for the woman, and the book describes the relation between Jæger, Oda and Christian during the summer and autumn of 1888.

=== Berlin ===
In the 1890s the Krohgs moved to Berlin. During a quarrel with August Strindberg, who became provoked when Oda tuned his guitar in front of the guests at a party at Strindberg's favorite bar, "Zum Schwarzen Ferkel", the dramatist Gunnar Heiberg defended her.

=== Paris again ===
Oda Krohg and Heiberg soon fell in love and in 1897, she took one of her children, her son Per, and moved to Paris with Heiberg. Her husband took a position as an art instructor at Académie Colarossi in Paris not long thereafter and Oda obtained an artist's studio in Montparnasse. Within a short time she became acquainted with some of the leading artists in the city, including Henri Matisse. In 1903 she showed at the Salon de Paris, and a year later held her first exhibition at the Salon d'Automne, where she continued to be regularly involved until 1909. During this time she was in a relationship with the poet and art critic Jappe Nilssen. Oda separated from him and returned to her husband. A little while later they returned to Oslo.

== Works ==
Having little formal art education, she quickly absorbed the knowledge of the artistic environment she was a part of. Her debut was in 1886 with Ved Kristianiafjorden (Japansk lykt) («By the Oslofjord (Japanese lantern)»), which now is stored in the National Gallery of Norway. Her first years as an artist are seen as an example of new Romantic painting. Her later portrait works make another, more robust impression. Oda Krohg is known for her landscapes, among them Ved Kristianiafjorden (Japansk lykt) and Ved engen (Kinesisk lykt) («On the meadow (Chinese lantern)», 1889) and other works like En abonnent på Aftenposten («A subscriber to the Evening Post», 1887), Fra festen («From the party», 1892) and Rouge et Noir (1912) and the brave Christian Krohg på Karl Johan («Christian Krohg at Karl Johansgate», 1912). She also painted portraits of, among others, Aasta Hansteen, Ivar Arosenius, Gunnar Heiberg, Johanne Dybwad and Christian Krohg.

Oda was also a central figure in the anti-culture movement of the Kristiania Bohemians (Kristiania-bohemen) in the 1880s and 1890s. Her public image as the "Bohemian Princess" has to some extent obscured the impression of a competent painter. Krohg exhibited her work at the Palace of Fine Arts at the 1893 World's Columbian Exposition in Chicago, Illinois.

She was buried at the National Cemetery (Æreslund) at Vår Frelsers gravlund in Oslo.

== Legacy ==
Her life is described in Ketil Bjørnstad's novel Oda! (1983). The song "Sommernatt ved fjorden" (1978) by Ketil Bjørnstad, sung by the operasinger Ellen Westberg Andersen, describes Hans Jaeger and Oda Lasson in a small boat out on the fjord on a summer night.
