= Nils Astrup =

Norwegian politician

Nils Astrup (11 November 1778 – 26 September 1835) was a Norwegian politician.

He was elected to the Norwegian Parliament in 1820, representing the constituency of Nedenæs og Raabygdelagets Amt. He worked as a vogt there. He served only one term.

He was born in Ørskog. His father had immigrated from Slesvig. In 1816 in Molde he married Ingeborg Ross Müller (1788–1848) from Trondhjem. The couple had several children. Nils Astrup died in 1835 in Christiania. He was the great-grandfather of painter Nikolai Astrup, and also related to politician Hans Rasmus Astrup.
