= The Brian Jonestown Massacre discography =

- Studio albums: 20
- Extended plays: 14
- Live albums: 5
- Compilation albums: 6
- Singles: 24
- Video albums: 2

The discography of The Brian Jonestown Massacre (a San Francisco, California based, Revivalist band) consists of 20 studio albums, 14 EPs, five live albums, six compilation albums and 24 singles, as well as appearing on various artist releases and soundtracks. They have one rockumentary (Dig!) to their credit and a DVD release of their music videos titled Book of Days. Their music has been released by Bomp!, TVT and Tee Pee Records, among others.

== Studio albums ==
| Year | Title | Record label | Format |
|---|---|---|---|
| 1995 | Methodrone | Bomp! Records (later reissued by A Records) | CD, LP |
| 1995 | Spacegirl and Other Favorites | Candy Floss Records/Tangible Records (later reissued by The Committee To Keep Music Evil and A Records) | CD, LP |
| 1996 | Take It from the Man! | Bomp! Records/Tangible Records (later reissued by Tee Pee Records and A Records) | CD, LP |
| 1996 | Their Satanic Majesties' Second Request | Tangible Records (later reissued by The Committee To Keep Music Evil and A Records) | CD, LP |
| 1996 | Thank God for Mental Illness | Bomp! Records (later reissued by A Records) | CD, LP |
| 1997 | Give It Back! | Bomp! Records/Tangible Records (later reissued by Wise Records (Japan) and A Records) | CD, LP |
| 1998 | Strung Out in Heaven | TVT Records/Rock Records (Japan) (later reissued by A Records) | CD, LP |
| 2001 | Bravery, Repetition and Noise | The Committee To Keep Music Evil (later reissued by Substance Records (Japan), Chatterbox Records (Australia) and A Records) | CD, LP |
| 2003 | ...And This Is Our Music | Tee Pee Records (later reissued by Chatterbox Records (Australia) and A Records) | CD, LP |
| 2008 | My Bloody Underground | A Records | CD, LP |
| 2010 | Who Killed Sgt. Pepper? | A Records | CD, LP |
| 2012 | Aufheben | A Records/Diffuse Echo Records (Japan) (later reissued by Burger Records) | CD, LP, DD |
| 2014 | Revelation | A Records/Wise Records (Japan) (later reissued by Burger Records) | CD, LP, DD |
| 2015 | Musique de Film Imaginé | A Records | CD, LP, DD |
| 2016 | Third World Pyramid | A Records | CD, LP, DD |
| 2017 | Don't Get Lost | A Records | CD, LP, DD |
| 2018 | Something Else | A Records | CD, LP, DD |
| 2019 | The Brian Jonestown Massacre | A Records | CD, LP, DD |
| 2022 | Fire Doesn't Grow on Trees | A Records | CD, LP, DD |
| 2023 | The Future Is Your Past | A Records | CD, LP, DD |

== EPs ==
| Year | Title | Record label | Format |
|---|---|---|---|
| 1997 | This Is Why You Love Me | Tangible Records, Committee to Keep Music Evil, Org Records, A Records | 12", CD |
| 1998 | Love | Tangible Records, Committee to Keep Music Evil, A Records | 12", CD |
| 1999 | Bringing It All Back Home – Again | Tangible Records, Which? Records, Rock Records, A Records, Committee to Keep Music Evil | CD, LP |
| 2000 | Zero: Songs from the Album 'Bravery, Repetition, and Noise' | Committee to Keep Music Evil, A Records | CD |
| 2001 | If I Love You? | Tangible Records, Committee to Keep Music Evil, A Records | 12" |
| 2003 | If Love Is the Drug Then I Want to OD | Tee Pee Records | CD |
| 2005 | We Are the Radio | Tee Pee Records | CD, LP |
| 2008 | Just Like Kicking Jesus | 12 Tonar, A Records | 12", CD |
| 2009 | Smoking Acid | A Records | 12", CD |
| 2009 | One | A Records | 12", CD |
| 2013 | Fist Full of Bees (numbered; Record Store Day 2013) | A Records | 12" |
| 2013 | Revolution Number Zero (numbered) | A Records | 2×7", CD |
| 2014 | +/– EP (numbered) | A Records | 10" |
| 2015 | Mini Album Thingy Wingy | A Records | CD, LP, 2×10", DD |

== Singles ==
| Year | Title | Record label | Format |
|---|---|---|---|
| 1992 | "She Made Me" b/w "Evergreen" | Bomp! Records (BMP 140)/Tangible Records (TAN-1006) | 7” |
| 1993 | "Convertible" b/w "Enrique's Dream (Their Satanic Majesty's 2nd Request)" | Bomp! Records (BMP 143)/Tangible Records (TAN 1008) | 7” |
| 1994 | "Hide and Seek" b/w "Methodrone (Live at the Compound)" | Candy Floss Records (CF004)/Tangible Records (TAN 1013) | 7” |
| 1995 | "Cold to the Touch" b/w "Anemone" | Candy Floss Records (CF-012)/Tangible Records (TAN 1018) | 7” |
| 1996 | "Never Ever" b/w "Feelers" | Stanton Park Records (STP-023)/Tangible Records (TAN-1028) | 7” |
| 1997 | "Not If You Were the Last Dandy on Earth" b/w "Untitled" | The Committee to Keep Music Evil (EVIL 1) | 12” |
| 1998 | "Love b/w Wasting Away" (Demo)/"This Is Why You Love Me" | TVT Records (TVT-5781-2) | CD |
| 2003 | "Prozac vs Heroin" b/w "Nailing Honey to the Bee" | Numero Group (Numero 7) | 7” |
| 2003 | "If Love Is the Drug Then I Want to OD" b/w "When Jokers Attack" | Tee Pee Records (TPE-054) | 7” |
| 2010 | "Iluminomi" b/w "There's a War Going On" | A Records (AUK022-LP) | 10”, DD |
| 2016 | "La Façon Dont la Machine Vers l'Arrière" b/w "La Façon Dont la Machine Vers l'Arrière (Al Lover Remix)" | Höga Nord Rekords (HNR014) | 7”, DD |
| 2016 | "Bout Des Doigts" b/w "Fingertips" | A Records (AUK034-10) | 10”, DD |
| 2016 | "The Sun Ship" b/w "Playtime" | A Records (AUK035-10) | 10”, DD |
| 2017 | "Groove Is in the Heart" b/w "Throbbing Gristle" | A Records (AUK037-10) | 10”, DD |
| 2017 | "Open Minds Now Close" b/w "Melody's Actual Echo Chamber"/"Öppna Sinnen Stängs Nu" | A Records (AUK038-12) | 12”, DD |
| 2017 | "Dropping Bombs on the Sun (UFO Paycheck)" b/w "Geldenes Herz Menz" | A Records (AUK039-10) | 10”, DD |
| 2018 | "Hold That Thought" b/w "Drained" | A Records (AUK042-10) | 10”, DD |
| 2018 | "Forgotten Graves" b/w "Tombes Oubliées" | A Records (AUK044-10) | 10”, DD |
| 2021 | The Brian Jonestown Massacre: "Before You Forget" b/w The Telescopes: "Come Down My Love (Anton Newcombe Remix)" | A Records (AUK046-10), split single for Record Store Day 2021 | 10”, DD |
| 2022 | "The Real" b/w "Where Do We Go from Here?" | A Records (AUK047-10) | 10”, DD |
| 2022 | "Fudge" b/w "The Future Is Your Past" | A Records (AUK048-10) | 10”, DD |
| 2023 | "Abandon Ship (Martian Meltdown Mix)" b/w "Maybe Make It Right" | A Records (AUK051-10) | 10”, DD |
| 2024 | "Don't Look at Me" | A Records | DD |
| 2025 | "Makes Me Great" b/w "Out of Mind" | A Records (AUK142-10) | 10”, DD |

== Compilations ==
| Year | Title | Record label | Format |
|---|---|---|---|
| 1998 | This Is Why You Love Me (The Org-An-Ised Single Series) | Org Records | CD |
| 2004 | The Diane Perry Tape | N/A (download only) | MP3 |
| 2004 | Your Side of Our Story | N/A (download only) | MP3 |
| 2004 | Tepid Peppermint Wonderland: A Retrospective | Tee Pee Records/Smash Music (Australia) (later reissued by A Records) | CD, LP |
| 2011 | Singles Collection 1992–2011 | A Records | 2×CD |
| 2012 | Pol Pot's Pleasure Penthouse (early 1990s demo tape) | Burger Records (later reissued by A Records for Record Store Day 2017) | Cass, LP |

== Videos ==
| Year | Details |
|---|---|
| 2004 | Dig!: Director: Ondi Timoner; Released: January 18, 2004 (theatrically); Rockumentary; Format: DVD |
| 2008 | Book of Days: Director: Released: 2008; Collection of music videos; Format: DVD |

== Live albums ==
| Year | Title | Record label | Format |
|---|---|---|---|
| 1998 | Peel Sessions 1998: 1. "Who?"; 2. "Hide and Seek"; 3. "Feel So Good"; 4. "Jennifer"; 5. "True Love"; 6. "Stillborn"; 7. "Nailing Honey to the Bee"; 8. "Swallowtail"; 9. "Sailor (Clip)"; 10. "Free"; 11. "Somewhere"; 12. "Up"; 13. "Feel It"; 14. "Nailing Honey to the Bee (Again)"; 15. "Tschuss"; 16. Good Morning Girl" | N/A (download only) | MP3 |
| 2003 | Live at KVRX: 03/14/03: 1. "Swallowtail"; 2. "Going to Hell"; 3. "(David Bowie I Love You) Since I Was Six" | N/A (download only) | MP3 |
| 2005 | Live Lollapalooza: Chicago, IL, 07/23/05: 1. "Intro"; 2. "Whoever You Are"; 3. "Let Me Stand Next to Your Flower"; 4. "Nailing Honey to the Bee"; 5. "Hide and Seek"; 6. "When Jokers Attack"; 7. "Sailing"; 8. "Swallowtail"; 9. "Oh Lord/Jesus" (bonus track; Anton and Matt with The Dandy Warhols) | N/A (download only) | MP3 |
| 2005 | Live Transmusicales: Rennes, France, 12/09/05: 1. "Whoever You Are"; 2. "Nailing Honey to the Bee"; 3. "Let Me Stand Next to Your Flower"; 4. "Jennifer"; 5. "Servo"; 6. "Monster"; 7. "When Jokers Attack"; 8. "Swallowtail" | N/A (download only) | MP3 |
| 2008 | Live at the Hi-Fi: Melbourne, Australia, 30th August 2008: 1. "Whoever You Are"; 2. "Yeah Yeah"; 3. "Nailing Honey to the Bee"; 4. "Here it Comes"; 5. "Vacuum Boots"; 6. "Who?"; 7. "Hide and Seek"; 8. "When Jokers Attack"; 9. "Sailor"; 10. "A New Low in Getting High"; 11. "Evergreen"; 12. "Prefab Ambulatory Device" | The Hi-Fi Live | CD |

== Multiple-band compilations ==
The BJM have been featured on the following multiple-band compilations:

- Pure Spun Sugar, Track 12 – "Good Morning Girl" (CD, American Pop Project & Candy Floss, CF-017, AmPop 201CD, 1998)
- Delphonic Sounds Today!, Track 1 – "I Fought the Law (The Bobby Fuller Four)" (CD, DEL-FI Records, DFCD 2114, 1999)

In 1993 Bomp! and Tangible Records co-released a box set of six singles, each by a different San Francisco "psych" band. The bands were apparently handpicked by Anton Newcombe himself, and it is rumored that he also produced the music. Besides The Brian Jonestown Massacre, other bands featured included Orange, Nebtwister, and Hollowbody.

The other two singles (as credited to Acid and Reverb) are 4-track demos. Acid is by Newcombe and Travis Threlkel (who designed the box-cover and record sleeves), while Reverb is Threlkel and Geoffrey Bankowski, then a member of Hollowbody, currently recording as Good and Angry in New York City.

Tangible Singles Box

1. Hollowbody: "Shelter Island"/"Tangled" (TAN 1011/BMP 146)
2. Orange: "Starwheel"/"Feijoa" (TAN 1007/BMP 142)
3. Nebtwister: "Come on Down"/"Greedy Venus" (TAN 1009/BMP 144)
4. Acid: "Never, Ever"/"Thoughts of You" (TAN 1010/BMP 145)
5. The Brian Jonestown Massacre: "Convertible"/Enrique's Dream (Their Satanic Majesty's 2nd Request)" (TAN 1008/BMP 143)
6. Reverb: "Aftertouch"/"Matins" (TAN 1012/BMP 147)
