= List of The Brian Jonestown Massacre members =

The Brian Jonestown Massacre is an American rock band founded by Anton Newcombe (vocals, guitar), Matt Hollywood (guitar, vocals), Ricky Rene Maymi (drums, bass), Patrick Straczek (guitar) and Travis Threlkel (guitar) in the early 1990s in San Francisco.

== Members ==
=== Current members ===
The following were present on the band's most recent world tour:

- Anton Newcombe – vocals, guitar (1990–present)
- Joel Gion – tambourine, maracas (1994–1999, 2001, 2006–present)
- Hákon Aðalsteinsson – guitar (2018–present)
- Ricky Maymi – guitar (2003–present), bass, drums (1990–1993)
- Collin Hegna – bass (2004–2018, 2022–present)
- Hallberg Daði Hallbergsson – bass (2018, 2023–present)
- Emil Nikolaisen – keyboards (2023–present)
- Tobias Humble – drums (2025–present)

=== Former members ===
In alphabetical order:

- Dan Allaire – drums (2002–2018)
- Uri Rennert – drums (2022–2023, 2025)
- Brad Artley – drums (1996–1997)
- Alison Briggs – sitar (1999–2001, 2003–2004)
- Rob Campanella – keyboard, organ, guitar (2000–2018)
- Jeff Davies – Lead guitar, organ, backing vocals (1992–1999, 2001–2003)
- Frankie "Teardrop" Emerson – guitar (2000–2015)
- Brian Glaze – drums (1994–1998)
- Peter Hayes – guitar (1997–1998)
- Matt Hollywood – guitar, vocals, founding member (1990–1998, 2009–2015)
- Mara Keagle – vocals, percussion (Anemone)
- Dave Koenig – bass (2001–2004)
- Billy Pleasant — drums (1997—1999)
- Dan Lyons – drums (2023)
- Stuart Mann – drums (2018)
- Deborah 'Moogy' Morgan – keyboards, percussion, vocals (Only appeared at limited European shows)
- A.J. Morris – drums (1998)
- Sara Neidorf – drums (2018)
- Miranda Lee Richards – guitar, backing vocals (1995–1999)
- Shea Roberts – tambourine, guitar (2023) (filled in for Joel on Australian 2023 tour)
- Patrick Straczek – guitar (1991)
- Dean Taylor – guitar (1996–1999)
- Dawn Thomas – bass, guitar, accordion, flute (1993–1997)
- Travis Threlkel – guitar (1990–1993)
- Matthew J. Tow – guitar (2003)
- Vanessa "Singer" Hopkins – vocals (1992)
- Ryan Van Kriedt – guitar, keyboards (2015–2023)

== Comprehensive line-up history ==
	Guitar	Bass	Drums	Vocals	Miscellaneous, Guests, Etc.
1990–1991	Anton Newcombe Matt Hollywood; Ricky Maymi; Sean Curran; Patrick Straczek; Travis Threlkel	Matt Hollywood Ricky Maymi; Sean Curran	Ricky Maymi	Anton Newcombe Matt Hollywood	Sean Curran live shows only as guitarist or bassist when needed
1992	Anton Newcombe Matt Hollywood; Jeff Davies; Ricky Maymi; Travis Threlkel	Matt Hollywood Ricky Maymi; Sean Curran	Ricky Maymi	Anton Newcombe Matt Hollywood Vanessa "Singer"	Sean Curran live shows only as guitarist or bassist when needed
1993	Anton Newcombe Matt Hollywood; Jeff Davies; Ricky Maymi; Travis Threlkel; Elise Dye	Matt Hollywood Ricky Maymi; Sean Curran; Chris Dupré	Ricky Maymi Brant Graff	Anton Newcombe Matt Hollywood	Ian Sefchik - Guitar; Sean Curran live shows only as guitarist or bassist when needed
1994	Anton Newcombe Matt Hollywood; Jeff Davies; Elise Dye; Dean Taylor	Matt Hollywood Chris Dupré	Brian Glaze; Milo Warner Martin	Anton Newcombe Matt Hollywood	Joel Gion - Tambourine/Maracas Sophie Guenan - Tambourine; Mara Keagle - Organ; Dawn Thomas - Accordion
1995	Anton Newcombe Matt Hollywood; Jeff Davies; Elise Dye; Dean Taylor	Matt Hollywood Sean Curran	Brian Glaze; Milo Warner Martin Graham Bonnar	Anton Newcombe Matt Hollywood; Miranda Lee Richards; Mara Keagle	Joel Gion - Tambourine/Maracas Sophie Guenan - Tambourine; Mara Keagle - Organ (appears as "Mara Kagel" on Take It From The Man!); Dawn Thomas - Accordion; Sean Curran live shows only as guitarist or bassist when needed Eufloria - Vocals on "Evergreen" & "Wisdom (Demo)"; Paolo Simmonds- Vocals on "Everyone Says"
1996	Anton Newcombe Matt Hollywood; Jeff Davies; Dean Taylor; Derek Hoeckel	Matt Hollywood	Brian Glaze Mike Burns; Brad Artley	Anton Newcombe Matt Hollywood; Miranda Lee Richards; Mara Keagle	Joel Gion - Tambourine/Maracas Sean Curran live shows only as guitarist or bassist when needed Dawn Thomas - Accordion; Dan Knop - Vocals on "All Around You (intro)"
1997	Anton Newcombe Matt Hollywood; Jeff Davies; Robert Desmond; Dean Taylor; Miranda Lee Richards; Peter Hayes	Matt Hollywood	Brad Artley Jussi Tegelman; Adam Hamilton AJ Morris	Anton Newcombe Matt Hollywood; Robert Desmond; Miranda Lee Richards	Joel Gion - Tambourine/Maracas Robert Desmond - Cello; Raugust - Flute
1998	Anton Newcombe Matt Hollywood; Jeff Davies; Dean Taylor; Adam Le Blanc	Matt Hollywood Charles Mehling	Arik "Google Me" Ohlson Adam Hamilton; Aj Morris; Billy Pleasant; Marty Smith	Anton Newcombe Matt Hollywood; Miranda Lee Richards	Joel Gion - Tambourine/Maracas Miranda Lee Richards - Flute
1999	Anton Newcombe Jeff Davies; Dean Taylor; Miranda Lee Richards; Jeff Levitz; Lenny Pops; Bobby Hecksher; Christof Certik	Charles Mehling		Anton Newcombe Miranda Lee Richards	Joel Gion – percussion Christof Certik – keyboards Tony O'Neill – eyboards
2000	Anton Newcombe Frankie Emerson aka Frankie Teardrop; Jeff Levitz	Bobby Hecksher Tommy Dietrick	Hunter Crowley Greg Epman	Anton Newcombe	Mara Keagle - Vocals
2001	Anton Newcombe Jeff Davies; Frankie "Teardrop" Emerson; James Ambrose	Dave Koenig	Hunter Crowley	Anton Newcombe	Mara Keagle - Vocals on Bravery, Repetition and Noise (appears as "Mara") Joel Gion - Tambourine/Percussion; Raugust - Flute; Rob Campanella - Organ/Mellotron/Mandolin
2002	Anton Newcombe Jeff Davies; Frankie "Teardrop" Emerson; Kirpatrick Thomas	Dave Koenig	Dan Allaire	Anton Newcombe	Rob Campanella - Organ Jason Anchondo - Tambourine
2003	Anton Newcombe Frankie "Teardrop" Emerson; Ricky Maymi; Matthew J. Tow; Kirpatrick Thomas; Daniel "Bowerbird" Koontz	Dave Koenig; Tommy Dietrick	Dan Allaire	Anton Newcombe	Rob Campanella - Organ/Dobro/Piano/Mandolin Ed Harcourt - Vocals on "Here It Comes"; Daniella Meeker - Vocals on "Here It Comes"; Matt Tow - Vocals & wrote on "Starcleaner" (also wrote & sang on "A New Low In Getting High"); Joseph Campanella- whistling on "You Look Great When I'm Fucked Up"; Julie Carpenter - Violin/Cello/Vox on 'And This Is Our Music...'
2004	Anton Newcombe Frankie "Teardrop" Emerson; Ricky Maymi	Collin Hegna; Tommy Dietrick Dave Koenig	Dan Allaire Ryan Sumner; Brian Glaze	Anton Newcombe	Joel Gion - Tambourine/Maracas Rob Campanella - Organ; Zy Orange Lyn - Violin
2005	Anton Newcombe Frankie "Teardrop" Emerson; Ricky Maymi; Irina Yalkowsky	Collin Hegna	Dan Allaire	Anton Newcombe	Joel Gion - Tambourine/Maracas Rob Campanella - Organ; Sarabeth Tucek - Vocals on We Are The Radio
2006	Anton Newcombe Frankie "Teardrop" Emerson; Ricky Maymi; Irina Yalkowsky	Collin Hegna	Dan Allaire	Anton Newcombe	Joel Gion - Tambourine/Maracas Rob Campanella - Organ/Mellotron
2007	Anton Newcombe Frankie "Teardrop" Emerson; Ricky Maymi	Collin Hegna	Dan Allaire	Anton Newcombe	Joel Gion - Tambourine/Maracas Rob Campanella - Organ/Mellotron
2008	Anton Newcombe Frankie "Teardrop" Emerson; Ricky Maymi	Collin Hegna Will Carruthers	Dan Allaire	Anton Newcombe	Joel Gion - Tambourine/Maracas Rob Campanella - Organ/Mellotron; Henrik Baldvin Bjornsson - Vox
2009–2015	Anton Newcombe Matt Hollywood; Frankie "Teardrop" Emerson; Ricky Maymi	Collin Hegna	Dan Allaire	Anton Newcombe Matt Hollywood	Joel Gion - Tambourine/Maracas Rob Campanella - Organ/Mellotron
2015–2018	Anton Newcombe Ricky Maymi; Ryan Van Kriedt; Hákon Aðalsteinsson	Collin Hegna Hallberg Daði Hallbergsson	Dan Allaire	Anton Newcombe	Joel Gion - Tambourine/Maracas Ryan Van Kriedt - Organ/Mellotron
2022–2023	Anton Newcombe Ricky Maymi; Hákon Aðalsteinsson	Collin Hegna	Uri Rennert	Anton Newcombe	Joel Gion - Tambourine/Maracas
