= Tepid Peppermint Wonderland: A Retrospective =

Compilation album by The Brian Jonestown Massacre
- Released: November 16, 2004
- Genre: Psychedelic rock
- Length: 141:51
- Label: Tee Pee

The Brian Jonestown Massacre chronology
And This Is Our Music (2003)	Tepid Peppermint Wonderland: A Retrospective (2004)	We Are the Radio (2005)

Professional ratings
Review scores
Source	Rating
AllMusic	4/5 stars
Blender	3/5 stars
Classic Rock	4/5 stars
Pitchfork	6.5/10
The Village Voice	C+

Tepid Peppermint Wonderland: A Retrospective is a double compilation album by American psychedelic rock band The Brian Jonestown Massacre, released in 2004. The album is a best-of compilation spanning the band's career (with the exception of Strung Out in Heaven, due to legal issues).

== Track listing ==
Disc one

No.	Title	Original release	Length
1.	"All Around You (Intro)"	Their Satanic Majesties' Second Request (1996)	5:36
2.	"Who?"	Take It from the Man! (1996)	2:54
3.	"When Jokers Attack"	And This Is Our Music (2003)	3:43
4.	"Servo"	Give It Back! (1997)	3:24
5.	"Open Heart Surgery"	Bravery Repetition and Noise (2001)	4:15
6.	"If Love Is the Drug"	Originally from Zero EP (2000), re-recorded for If Love Is The Drug Then I Want To OD EP (2004)	3:59
7.	"IT Girl"	Thank God for Mental Illness (1996)	2:12
8.	"Sailor"	Bravery Repetition And Noise	3:44
9.	"Straight Up and Down"	Take It From The Man!	4:30
10.	"Anenome"	Their Satanic Majesties' Second Request	5:27
11.	"Wisdom"	Methodrone (1995)	5:17
12.	"Just for Today"	Bravery Repetition And Noise	4:17
13.	"Stars"	Thank God For Mental Illness	3:14
14.	"Vacuum Boots"	Take It From The Man!	2:55
15.	"Prozac vs. Heroin"	And This Is Our Music	3:54
16.	"She's Gone"	Methodrone	7:17

Disc two

No.	Title	Original release	Length
1.	"Nailing Honey to the Bee"	"Prozac Vs. Heroin" single (2003)	2:38
2.	"That Girl Suicide"	Methodrone	3:39
3.	"Nevertheless"	Bravery Repetition And Noise	3:29
4.	"Evergreen"	Methodrone	3:23
5.	"Starcleaner"	And This Is Our Music	2:28
6.	"Let Me Stand Next to Your Flower" (live)	Previously unreleased (studio version from Bravery Repetition And Noise)	3:29
7.	"Hide and Seek" (live)	Previously unreleased (studio version from Spacegirl and Other Favorites (1995))	4:18
8.	"In My Life"	Take It From The Man!	2:23
9.	"Mary Please"	Take It From The Man!	4:09
10.	"Talk - Action = Shit"	Thank God For Mental Illness	2:01
11.	"Oh Lord"	Take It From The Man!	3:21
12.	"This Is Why You Love Me"	Give It Back!	1:53
13.	"Not If You Were the Last Dandy on Earth"	Non-album single (1997)	2:46
14.	"Swallowtail" (live)	Previously unreleased (studio version from If I Love You? EP (2001))	6:26
15.	"Feel So Good"	Previously unreleased	4:42
16.	"Fucker"	Take It From The Man!	2:14
17.	"#1 Hit Jam"	Give It Back!	4:54
18.	"Ballad of Jim Jones"	Thank God For Mental Illness	2:15
19.	"Free and Easy, Take 2"	Thank God For Mental Illness	2:30
20.	"Stolen"	Bravery Repetition And Noise	1:27
21.	"Mansion in the Sky"	Bringing It All Back Home – Again EP (1999)	2:19
22.	"Sue"	Give It Back!	8:29

== Personnel ==
The song "If Love Is the Drug" contains uncredited vocals by Josie Fluri of the musical group New Roman Times.
