= The Lovetones =

Australian rock band

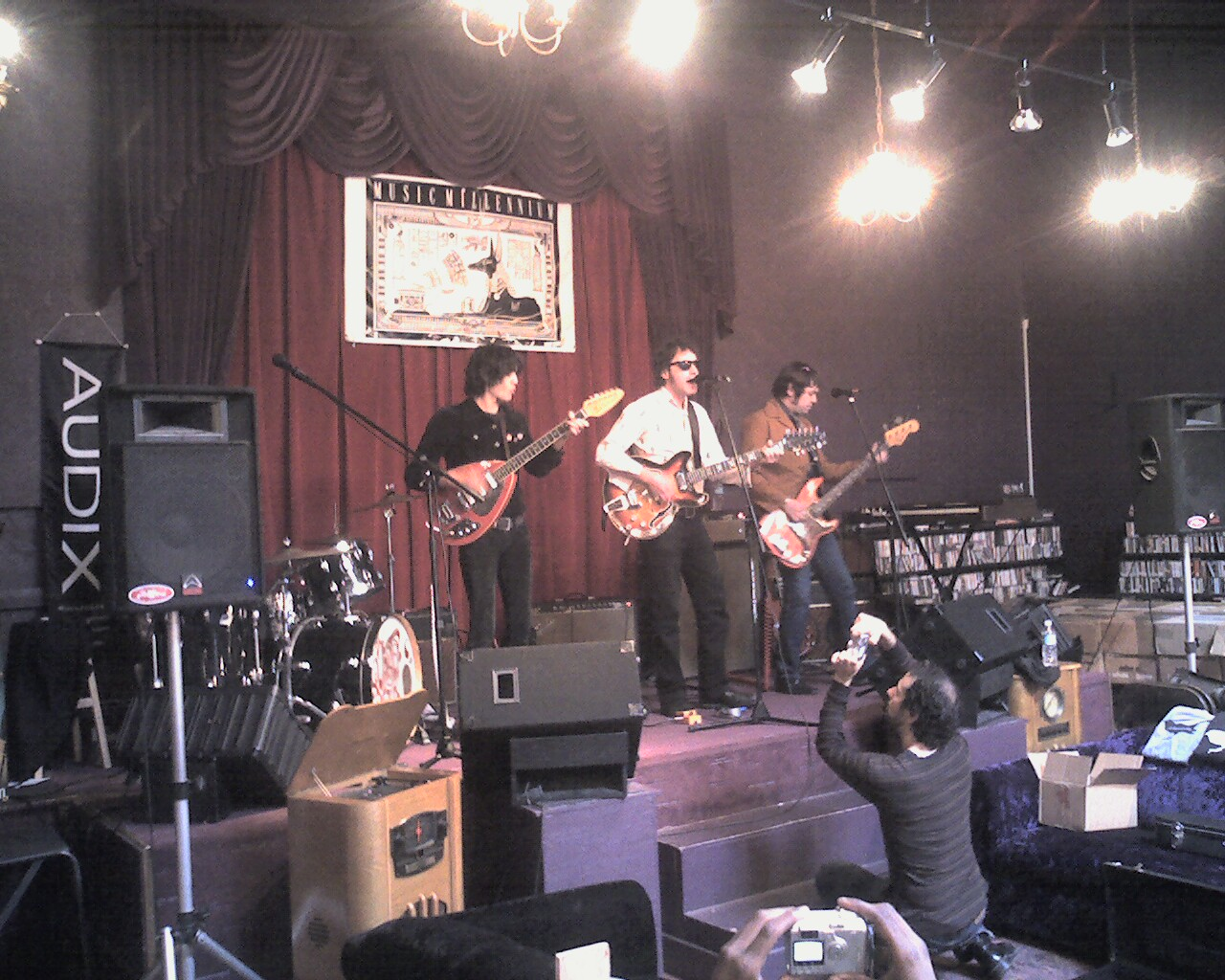
- The Lovetones playing at Kelly's Olympian in Portland, Oregon in June 2007

Background information
- Origin: Sydney and Melbourne
- Genres: Psychedelic rock, indie rock
- Years active: 2002–present
- Labels: Bomp! (US); Cargo (UK); Chatterbox (Australia); Tee Pee (US); Undercover (Australia)
- Members: Matthew J. Tow; Matthew Sigley; Liam Judson; Robert de Freitas Young; Chris Cobb
- Past members: Serge Luca; Nick Neal; Nick Hurford; Robert Campanella; Nelson Bragg
- Website: thelovetones.com

The Lovetones are an Australian psychedelic rock band.

== History ==
The Lovetones released their debut album, Be What You Want, in 2002 through Bomp! Records subsidiary The Committee to Keep Music Evil. The album was reviewed in Creem and Rolling Stone magazines.

After enjoying the critical success of Be What You Want, touring Australia extensively, and even supporting Morrissey during his first-ever solo Australian tour, Tow joined The Brian Jonestown Massacre in 2003. He contributed two tracks to their album, ...And This Is Our Music. Tow's opening track "Starcleaner" later also appeared on the BJM retrospective Tepid Peppermint Wonderland. In the same year, UK-based Fire Records invited The Lovetones to contribute to the James Joyce Chamber Music project alongside Mercury Rev, Sonic Youth, and REM's Peter Buck. In 2004, The Lovetones released the Stars EP, which coincided with their support of The Brian Jonestown Massacre on their tour of Australia.

The second album, Meditations, was released through New York's Tee Pee Records in late 2005. After returning from shows in the US in late 2005 and a 2006 appearance at SXSW, The Lovetones toured to support Meditations Australian release in May 2006. In June 2006, the band completed a European tour across 12 countries with The Brian Jonestown Massacre in support of Meditations, which was released in Europe through Tee Pee/Cargo Records and garnered an album review in the UK magazine Uncut.

The Lovetones recorded their third album, Axiom, during 2006, with sessions split between Figment Studios in Hollywood and the Sydney Opera House Recording Studio. It was released in June 2007 through Tee Pee Records.

Their fourth album, Dimensions, was released 4 November 2008 in Australia through Undercover Records and 6 April 2009 in North America through Planting Seeds Records.

The Lovetones performed a reunion show in Sydney on 31 July 2015. They released their latest single "Way the Light Dances" on 24 December 2022.

== Members ==
- Matthew J. Tow – vocals/guitars
- Matthew Sigley – bass/keyboards/vocals
- Liam Judson – guitars
- Robert de Freitas Young – guitars
- Chris Cobb – drums/percussion

== Discography ==
=== Albums ===
- Be What You Want (2003), Yep! Records / The Committee to Keep Music Evil
- Meditations (2005), Yep! Records / Tee Pee Records
- Axiom (2007), Yep! Records / Tee Pee Records
- Dimensions (2008), Yep! Records / Planting Seeds Records
- Lost (2010), Yep! Records / Planting Seeds Records
- Myriad (2020), Cleopatra

=== Singles ===
- "Be What You Want EP" (2002), Yep! Records
- "Give It All I Can EP" (2002), Yep! Records
- "Stars/It's Not Over Yet" (2003), Numero Group
- "Stars EP" (2003), Chatterbox Records
- "Wintertime In Hollywood" (split with Belles Will Ring) (2007), Various Artists Presents
- "Way The Light Dances" (2022), United Records NYC

=== Compilation ===
- "Provenance – Collected Works" (2012), Yep! Records/Undercover Music
