= Strung Out in Heaven =

Studio album by The Brian Jonestown Massacre
- Released: June 23, 1998
- Recorded: Early 1998
- Genre: Psychedelic rock
- Length: 47:12
- Label: TVT
- Producers: Anton Newcombe, Mark Dutton

The Brian Jonestown Massacre chronology
Give It Back! (1997)	Strung Out in Heaven (1998)	Bringing It All Back Home – Again (1999)

Strung Out in Heaven is the seventh studio album by American psychedelic rock band The Brian Jonestown Massacre. It was released on June 23, 1998, and was the band's first and only recording with the large independent label TVT Records.

== Background ==
After releasing a number of well-received recordings on the smaller psychedelia-focused Bomp! Records label, The Brian Jonestown Massacre were signed to a multi-record deal with TVT.

== Recording and content ==
Matt Hollywood contributed more to this record due to Anton Newcombe being incapable of writing as many songs as he was addicted to heroin at the time.

The album is named after a lyric from the David Bowie song "Ashes to Ashes".

"Wisdom" is a re-recording of the same song that originally appeared on the band's second album, Methodrone. "Dawn" is also a re-recording, with the original version appearing on Take It from the Man!. "Spun" is also a re-recording of the same song that appears on the band's album Thank God for Mental Illness.

=== Musical style ===
AllMusic's Jason Ankeny writes, "Settling into a blissfully psychedelic drift, the album opts not for the Stones-inspired raunch of before but for Byrds-like guitars, muffled drums and pulsating Hammond organ lines, all topped off by Anton Newcombe's half-stoned, half-shamanic vocals".

== Release ==
The recording didn't sell as many records as TVT had hoped, and they later mutually dissolved their remaining contractual obligations.

"Love" was released as a CD single, with a demo of "Wasting Away" as a B-side on TVT Records in 1998. "Love" and "Nothing to Lose" was also released as a double A-side single independently in 1997. The release featured "Let's Pretend It's Summer", "I've Been Waiting", "The Devil May Care (Mom & Dad Don't)" and an alternate version of "I've Been Waiting" as B-sides.

== Critical reception ==
Professional ratings
Review scores
Source	Rating
AllMusic	4/5 stars
Head Heritage	favorable

AllMusic praised the album, calling it "their least immediate, most restrained record to date [...] Strung Out in Heaven proves as engaging as their past efforts, with a focus and cohesiveness often lacking from their more visceral work", also calling it "the BJM's most mature outing yet". Head Heritage described it as "BJM's most easily accessible and truly genius album thus far."

== Legacy ==
The song Going to Hell is featured in American Pie as well as the "Faith, Hope & Trick" episode of Buffy the Vampire Slayer .

== Track listing ==
All tracks are written by The Brian Jonestown Massacre.

No.	Title	Length
1.	"Going to Hell" (lyrics/vocals Newcombe)	2:59
2.	"Let's Pretend It's Summer" (lyrics/vocals Newcombe)	3:37
3.	"Wasting Away" (lyrics/vocals Newcombe)	3:14
4.	"Jennifer" (lyrics/vocals Newcombe)	3:32
5.	"Got My Eye on You" (lyrics Hollywood/vocals Hollywood/Gion)	3:11
6.	"Nothing to Lose" (lyrics/vocals Newcombe)	2:52
7.	"Love" (lyrics/vocals Newcombe)	3:54
8.	"Maybe Tomorrow" (lyrics Hollywood, Taylor/vocals Hollywood)	4:13
9.	"Spun" (lyrics/vocals Hollywood (re-recording)	4:15
10.	"I've Been Waiting" (lyrics/vocals Newcombe)	4:25
11.	"Dawn" (lyrics/vocals Newcombe) (re-recording)	2:13
12.	"Lantern" (lyrics/vocals Newcombe)	3:27
13.	"Wisdom" (lyrics/Newcombe/vocals Newcombe/Richards) (re-recording)	5:29
Total length:		47:12

== Personnel ==
- Anton Newcombe – vocals, guitar, bass, drums
- Matt Hollywood – bass, guitar, vocals
- Jeffrey Davies – guitar, organ
- Dean Taylor – guitar
- Joel Gion – percussion
- Miranda Lee Richards – vocals, flute
- Adam Hamilton – drums
- Norm Block – drums
- Johnny Haro – drums
