= We Are the Radio =

EP by The Brian Jonestown Massacre
- Released: 2005
- Genre: Rock
- Length: 15:32
- Label: Tee Pee
- Producer: Anton Newcombe

The Brian Jonestown Massacre chronology
Tepid Peppermint Wonderland: A Retrospective (2004)	We Are the Radio (2005)	My Bloody Underground (2008)

Professional ratings
Review scores
Source	Rating
Allmusic	3.5/5 stars

We Are the Radio is an EP by The Brian Jonestown Massacre, released in 2005. It features Sarabeth Tucek on vocals, who also wrote the song "Seer" and co-wrote "Time Is Honey (So Cut the Shit)" with Anton Newcombe. The record was produced by The Committee To Keep Music Evil and distributed by Tee Pee Records. The music continues in the electronic direction that was taken by the previous Brian Jonestown Massacre record, And This Is Our Music. The record's title is also a reference to this album.

== Track listing ==
1. "Never Become Emotionally Attached to Man, Woman, Beast or Child" – 3:41
2. "Seer" – 2:31
3. "Time Is Honey (So Cut the Shit)" – 2:54
4. "Teleflows vs. Amplification" – 3:05
5. "God Is My Girlfriend" – 3:21

== Personnel ==
- Anton Newcombe - Vocals, guitar, bass, synthesiser
- Sarabeth Tucek - Vocals
- Dan Allaire - Drums
