= Methodrone =

Studio album by The Brian Jonestown Massacre
- Released: August 25, 1995
- Genres: Shoegaze, psychedelic rock
- Length: 67:06
- Label: Bomp!
- Producers: Naut Human, David Deresinski

The Brian Jonestown Massacre chronology
Methodrone (1995)	Spacegirl and Other Favorites (1995)

Methodrone is the debut studio album by American psychedelic rock band The Brian Jonestown Massacre. The album was released in August 25, 1995 by record label Bomp!.

== Content ==
The title of the album is a portmanteau of the drug methadone, used in treatment of heroin addiction, and the word "drone". The album's dreamy shoegaze rock sound is comparable to that of Spacemen 3 and My Bloody Valentine.

Methodrone is the only album to feature vocalists Elise Dye and Paola Simmonds. Drummers Brian Glaze and Graham Bonnar were also brought into the line-up to replace Ricky Maymi who had begun playing bass in the band. It was also Graham Bonnar's only appearance in the band.

=== Cover artwork ===
The faces featured on the cover artwork are, clockwise from top left, Brian Glaze, Matt Hollywood, Anton Newcombe and Dean Taylor. The water ripple effect and composition resembles the cover artwork of The Stranglers' 1981 record La folie. The ripple effect also resembles the artwork of Pink Floyd's 1971 record Meddle.

== Release ==
"She Made Me" and "Evergreen" were previously released as a double A-side single in 1992.

Methodrone was released in 1995 by record label Bomp!. The album was released following the departure of guitarist and founding member Travis Threlkel.

The album was re-released in 2007 on Anton Newcombe's A Records.

"Wisdom" was later re-recorded on the band's first and only album with TVT Records, Strung Out in Heaven. "Wisdom", "She's Gone", "That Girl Suicide" and "Evergreen" were included on the band's greatest hits compilation Tepid Peppermint Wonderland: A Retrospective.

== Critical reception ==
Professional ratings
Review scores
Source	Rating
AllMusic	3/5 stars

Methodrone was largely ignored upon its release, but managed to garner a favorable review in CMJ New Music Monthly, with Brian Bannin writing: "Everything moves with the slowness and presence of a disgraced monarch in exile... At its best, Methodrone has the tormented grace of accepting doom".

In 2018, Pitchfork ranked Methodrone at number 33 on its list of "The 50 Best Shoegaze Albums of All Time".

== Track listing ==
All tracks are written by The Brian Jonestown Massacre except where stated.

No.	Title	Length
1.	"Evergreen" (lyrics Newcombe)	3:24
2.	"Wisdom" (lyrics Newcombe)	5:20
3.	"Crushed" (lyrics Newcombe)	6:08
4.	"That Girl Suicide" (lyrics Newcombe)	3:41
5.	"Wasted" (lyrics Newcombe)	4:21
6.	"Everyone Says" (lyrics Newcombe)	4:15
7.	"Short Wave" (lyrics Newcombe)	2:47
8.	"She Made Me" (lyrics Newcombe)	4:42
9.	"Hyperventilation" (lyrics Newcombe)	9:53
10.	"Records"	1:50
11.	"I Love You" (lyrics Newcombe/Travis Threlkel)	4:11
12.	"End of the Day" (lyrics Newcombe)	5:09
13.	"Outback"	4:07
14.	"She's Gone" (lyrics Newcombe)	7:18
Total length:		67:06

Hidden track
No.	Title	Length
1.	"Methodrone" (lyrics Newcombe)	4:52

== Personnel ==
Personnel as per liner notes.

The Brian Jonestown Massacre

- Anton Newcombe – guitar, bass, drums, vocals
- Jeffrey Davies – guitar ("That Girl Suicide", "Hyperventilation")
- Rick Maymi – bass ("Evergreen", "Wisdom", "Short Wave", "She Made Me")
- Matt Hollywood – bass, vocals ("That Girl Suicide", "Wasted", "Hyperventilation")
- Brian Glaze – drums ("That Girl Suicide", "Wasted", "Hyperventilation")
- Graham Bonnar – drums ("Wisdom", "Crushed", "Everyone Says", "Short Wave", "She Made Me", "She's Gone")
- Elise Dye – vocals ("Evergreen")
- Paola Simmonds – vocals ("Everyone Says")

Engineering and mixing

- Anton Newcombe ("Evergreen", "Crushed", "Everyone Says", "Records", "Outback", "She's Gone")
- David Deresinski ("Records", "End of the Day", "Outback", "She's Gone")
- Eric Holland ("Evergreen", "Wisdom", "Short Wave", "She Made Me", "I Love You")
- John Karr ("End of the Day")
- Jessica Wing ("Evergreen")
- Adriene Gulyassy ("Evergreen", "Crushed", "That Girl Suicide", "Wasted", "Everyone Says", "Hyperventilation")
