= Bringing It All Back Home – Again =

Bringing It All Back Home -Again

EP by The Brian Jonestown Massacre
- Released: 1999
- Genre: Folk rock; country rock
- Length: 29:30
- Label: Which? Records
- Producer: Anton Newcombe

The Brian Jonestown Massacre chronology
Strung Out in Heaven (1998)	Bringing It All Back Home -Again (1999)	Bravery, Repetition and Noise (2001)

Professional ratings
Review scores
Source	Rating
AllMusic	4/5 stars

Bringing It All Back Home – Again is an EP by American psychedelic rock band The Brian Jonestown Massacre. It was released in 1999 by record label Which?

== Content ==
The album's title is a play on the Bob Dylan album Bringing It All Back Home.

The song "Arkansas" is a slightly reworked cover of a Charles Manson song found on Lie: The Love & Terror Cult.

== Personnel ==
Until 2012, this EP was the last release to feature Matt Hollywood, who left the band following an onstage argument, footage of which can be seen in the documentary film Dig!.

== Track listing ==
1. "The Way It Was" – 2:50
2. "Mansion in the Sky" – 2:19
3. "Reign On" – 4:31
4. "The Godspell According to A. A. Newcombe" – 3:18
5. "All Things Great & Small" – 3:06
6. "Arkansas Revisited" – 13:26

== Personnel ==
- Anton Newcombe – guitar, harmonica, vocals
- Joel Gion – tambourine, maracas
- Miranda Lee Richards – guitar, vocals
- Matt Hollywood – bass, guitar, vocals
- Jeff Levitz (credited as Jeff Levits) – guitar

Mastering

- Sam McCall/Resin Recording

Artwork

- Design, Art Direction – Mike Prosenko
- Photography By [Cover Photo] – Kelly White
- Photography By [Interior Photo] – Sandy Wilson
