= Matt Hollywood =

American indie rock guitarist and singer

- Born: June 11, 1973 (age 53); Syracuse, New York
- Origin: Ventura, California
- Genres: Indie Rock, Alternative Rock

Matthew Hollywood (born June 11, 1973) is an American indie rock guitarist and singer. He was a founding member and leader of the Portland-based indie rock band The Out Crowd, as well as a founding member of the psychedelic rock band The Brian Jonestown Massacre. He currently fronts the drone rock band The Rebel Drones.

He was born in Syracuse, New York in 1973. He grew up in and around Ventura, California, and now resides in Los Angeles, California.

== The Imajinary Friends ==
Hollywood had been involved with the neo-psychedelic/surrealist rock band, The Imajinary Friends, that spawned from the original line-up of The Brian Jonestown Massacre in 1993. The band consisted of Travis Threlkel, Ricky Maymi (both from The BJM), Matt Hollywood, Graham Bonnar (of Swervedriver) and Tim Digulla (later of Tipsy). The band recorded its debut album Lunchtime In Infinity on Bomp! Records in 1994. Hollywood left the band due to his full-time commitment to The BJM and was replaced by Jeremy Davies (brother of founding BJM-member Jeff Davies).

== The Brian Jonestown Massacre ==
Matt Hollywood was a founding member of neo-psychedelic rock band, The Brian Jonestown Massacre, with the initial line-up of Anton Newcombe (guitar/vocals), Travis Threlkel (guitar), Ricky Maymi (drums), Jeff Davies (guitar) and Hollywood (bass).

Hollywood was a member of The BJM for roughly seven years as mainly a bass guitar player, but was also known to play acoustically at times. Over this period, Hollywood contributed many musical ideas to the band. He composed and sang several of The BJM's songs, most notably "Oh Lord", "Maybe Tomorrow", "No Come Down" and "Not if You Were the Last Dandy on Earth"; the latter of which parodied The Dandy Warhols' single "Not if You Were the Last Junkie on Earth", and led many people to believe the Dandys and The BJM were fighting. Hollywood has said of the song: "It always amazed me how this song got taken as evidence that Anton (Newcombe) was 'stalking' the Dandys - since he didn't even write it." The song was featured in the Jim Jarmusch film Broken Flowers.

He appears on the 2004 documentary DiG! with The BJM, which also includes footage of the onstage altercation that led to his departure from the band.

In 2010, it was reported that he has returned to the studio with The Brian Jonestown Massacre and was once again a full-time member.

In 2014, Hollywood announced his first solo show taking place December 26 in Atlanta, Georgia, and that he would be backed by Atlanta-based rock and roll band Reverends.

== Post-BJM ==
=== Magic Fingers ===
Before forming The Out Crowd, Hollywood was in Magic Fingers with Eric Hedford (of The Dandy Warhols and We Are Telephone) and Spike Keating (of Swoon 23 and Black Rebel Motorcycle Club).

=== The Out Crowd ===
Hollywood formed the indie rock band The Out Crowd in late 2001 with drummer Stuart Valentine, guitarist Elliott Barnes and tambourine player Sarah Jane.

The group released their debut album Go on, Give a Damn which was produced by Gregg Williams (The Dandy Warhols) in early 2003. Their follow up Then I Saw The Holy City was produced by Brian Coates and released in the fall of 2004. Hollywood confirmed that the band broke up in 2006.

== Discography ==
=== Albums with The BJM ===
- Spacegirl & Other Favorites (1993) Candy Floss
- Methodrone (1995) Bomp! Records
- Their Satanic Majesties' Second Request (1996) Bomp! Records/Tangible
- Take It From The Man! (1996) Bomp! Records/Tangible/Tee Pee Records
- Thank God For Mental Illness (1996) Bomp! Records/Tangible
- Give It Back! (1997) Bomp! Records/Tangible
- Strung Out in Heaven (1998) TVT Records
- Bringing It All Back Home – Again (1999) Which? Records
- Who Killed Sgt. Pepper? (2010) A Records
- Aufheben (2012) A Records

=== Albums with The Out Crowd ===
- Go On, Give a Damn (2003) Elephant Stone Records
- Then I Saw the Holy City (2004) The Kora Records

=== Albums with The Bad Feelings ===
- Self Titled (2018)
