= Give It Back! =

Studio album by The Brian Jonestown Massacre
- Released: October 7, 1997
- Genre: Psychedelic rock
- Length: 55:11
- Label: Bomp!
- Producer: Anton Newcombe; Mark Dutton

The Brian Jonestown Massacre chronology
Thank God for Mental Illness (1996)	Give It Back! (1997)	Strung Out in Heaven (1998)

Give It Back! is the sixth studio album by the American psychedelic rock band The Brian Jonestown Massacre, released in 1997 by the Bomp! record label.

== Background and recording ==
Notably, this is the only album with Peter Hayes, who later founded the Black Rebel Motorcycle Club.

The sessions for the record were filmed for the documentary Dig!. Though only a couple of minutes of these sessions appear in the film, the second disc of the double-disc DVD has more footage from the sessions, including the recording of "Not If You Were the Last Dandy on Earth", the guitar track for "Servo" and the vocals for "Super-Sonic". The latter song includes a sample of The Dandy Warhols' song "Be-In", the opening track from their ...The Dandy Warhols Come Down album.

The stand out single on the album, "Not If You Were the Last Dandy on Earth", is best known for being a sardonic reply to The Dandy Warhols' single "Not If You Were the Last Junkie on Earth", which was itself directed at The Brian Jonestown Massacre. On the DVD commentary for Dig!, Matt Hollywood claims that he wrote the song in a tongue-in-cheek manner towards The Dandy Warhols, and goes on to discuss how Anton Newcombe even borrowed elements of The Dandy Warhols' sound. "Not If You Were the Last Dandy on Earth"" was used on the soundtrack of Jim Jarmusch's 2005 film Broken Flowers.

== Critical reception ==
Professional ratings
Review scores
Source	Rating
AllMusic	4/5 stars

The AllMusic reviewer, Richie Unterberger, wrote of the album, "About half of this is run-of-the-mill pseudo-'60s garage/psych with too many indulgent guitar breaks. They get a lot more interesting when they slow things down to a wasted quasi-junkie folk-rock mode."

== Track listing ==
1. "Super-Sonic" – 5:15
2. "This Is Why You Love Me" – 1:55
3. "Satellite" – 3:39
4. "Malela" – 3:09
5. "Salaam" – 1:44
6. "Whoever You Are" – 4:41
7. "Sue" – 8:30
8. "(You Better Love Me) Before I Am Gone" – 3:35
9. "Not If You Were The Last Dandy On Earth" - 2:45
10. "#1 Hit Jam" – 4:55
11. "Servo" – 3:23
12. "The Devil May Care (Mom & Dad Don't)" – 6:04
13. "Their Satanic Majesties' Second Request (Enrique's Dream)" – 5:35

== Personnel ==
- Anton Newcombe – vocals, guitar, bass, drums, keyboards, sitar
- Matt Hollywood – bass guitar, vocals, guitar
- Jeff Davies – guitar
- Peter Hayes – guitar
- Joel Gion – percussion
- Miranda Richards – vocals, guitar
- Jussi Tegelman – drums
- Adam Hamilton – drums
- Raugust – flute
