= The Out Crowd =

- Origin: Portland, Oregon, United States
- Genres: Neo-psychedelia, folk rock
- Years active: 2001–2006
- Labels: The Kora, Elephant Stone
- Past members: Matt Hollywood; Stuart Valentine; Elliott Barnes; Sarah Jane; Caleb Spiegel; Dave Hicks; Zedekiah Lost; Joe Patterson

The Out Crowd was a U.S. indie rock band featuring bass guitarist Matt Hollywood, a former member of The Brian Jonestown Massacre. He formed the group in late 2001 in Portland, Oregon with drummer Stuart Valentine, guitarist Elliott Barnes, bassist Joe Patterson and tambourine player Sarah Jane.

Go on, Give a Damn was produced by Gregg Williams (The Dandy Warhols) and released in early 2003 on Elephant Stone Records. The band toured on the American West Coast in 2003. Then I Saw The Holy City was produced by Brian Coates, engineer/producer for The Dandy Warhols, and released in the fall of 2004 on The Kora Records. The Out Crowd supported fellow neo-psychedelic bands Dead Meadow and The Warlocks nationally in 2004 as well as The Dandy Warhols on their 2005 North American tour. Matt Hollywood has confirmed that the band broke up in 2006.

Since the demise of the band, Matt Hollywood has been recording songs and playing shows for his new project The Rebel Drones, Sarah Jane joined Portland band The Upsidedown and Stuart Valentine has been releasing solo material. In 2009, Matt Hollywood rejoined the Brian Jonestown Massacre. Scotch Recordings re-released their second album on limited edition vinyl in 2016.

== Discography ==
- Then I Saw the Holy City (2004) The Kora Records
- Go On, Give a Damn (2003) Elephant Stone Records

== In the media ==
- The Out Crowd was featured briefly on the DVD extras of the movie Dig! about The Dandy Warhols and The Brian Jonestown Massacre
- Their song "C'mon Children" from Go On, Give a Damn was featured on the soundtrack for London (2005 film) starring Jessica Biel and Jason Statham
