= Aufheben (album) =

Studio album by The Brian Jonestown Massacre
- Released: May 7, 2012
- Genre: Neo-psychedelia; krautrock
- Length: 51:09
- Label: A

The Brian Jonestown Massacre chronology
| Who Killed Sgt. Pepper? (2010) | Aufheben (2012) | Revelation (2014) |

Professional ratings
Aggregate scores
| Source | Rating |
|---|---|
| Metacritic | 73/100 |
Review scores
| Source | Rating |
| AllMusic | 4/5 stars |
| Drowned in Sound | 7/10 stars |
| NME | 8/10 stars |
| Pitchfork | 6.3/10 |

Aufheben is the twelfth studio album by The Brian Jonestown Massacre. It was released in May 2012 on band leader Anton Newcombe's A Records label.

== Release ==
The album was available for free streaming prior to its release.

== Recording ==
Aufheben was recorded in Berlin at Anton Newcombe's studio and Ed East's studio "Studio East".

It is their first album to feature founding guitarist Matt Hollywood since his departure from the band in 1999.

== Content ==
The title of the album comes from a German word with several meanings, such as "to lift up", "to abolish" or "to preserve". In philosophy, it is used by Hegel to explain what happens when a thesis and antithesis interact.

The cover art was taken from the Pioneer plaque of a representative depiction of humans and Earth's location in the Solar System that had been engraved onto a gold-anodized aluminium plaque which was affixed to the exterior of the Pioneer 10 NASA probe.

== Track listing ==
1. "Panic in Babylon" – 4:39
2. "Viholliseni Maalla" – 4:37
3. "Gaz Hilarant" – 2:41
4. "Illuminomi" – 3:49
5. "I Want to Hold Your Other Hand" – 4:29
6. "Face Down on the Moon" – 5:08
7. "The Clouds Are Lies" – 3:21
8. "Stairway to the Best Party in the Universe" – 4:21
9. "Seven Kinds of Wonderful" – 5:21
10. "Waking Up to Hand Grenades" – 5:34
11. "Blue Order / New Monday" – 7:09

== Personnel ==
- Anton Newcombe – guitars, vocals, bass, keyboards, drums, electronics
- Will Carruthers – bass, backing vocals
- Matt Hollywood – guitar
- Constantine Karlis – drums
- Joel Gion – tambourine

Additional Musicians:

- Hallberg Daði Hallbergsson – guitar
- Hakon Adalsteinsson – guitar
- Eliza Karmasalo – vocals (track 2)
- Friederike Bienert – flute
- Thibault Pesenti – vocals (track 4)
- Fab Leseure – keyboards, electronics
