= Elephant Stone (band) =

Canadian indie rock band

- Origin: Montreal, Quebec, Canada
- Genres: Indie rock, psychedelic rock
- Years active: 2008 – present
- Labels: Elephants On Parade; Indiecater Records; Fuzz Club; Little Cloud Records
- Members: Rishi Dhir; Miles Dupire; Robbie MacArthur; Jason Kent
- Website: Official site

Elephant Stone is a Canadian indie rock band. Fronted by Rishi Dhir, the band incorporates aspects of traditional Indian music including the sitar, tabla, and dilruba with Western psychedelic rock.

== History ==
Dhir formed Elephant Stone in 2009 after he left The High Dials. The band combined Indian classical music and instrumentation with 1960s pop and rock.

The band's debut album, The Seven Seas, was released June 2, 2009, on Dhir's own Elephants on Parade label, with distribution by Fontana North. The album was a longlisted nominee for the 2009 Polaris Music Prize on June 15, 2009.

On July 4, 2009, The Seven Seas was released on Irish label Indiecater Records.

On February 12, 2013, their self-titled second album was released on Reverberation Appreciation Society.

The band's third full-length album, The Three Poisons, was released in 2014. In 2015, Burger Records released a cassette featuring a remixed version of The Three Poisons titled ES3PRMX. The cassette features collaborations with Anton Newcombe of The Brian Jonestown Massacre, Fabien Leseure, Tom Furse of The Horrors, Al Lover, Alex Maas of The Black Angels, Peter Holmstrom of The Dandy Warhols and JM Lapham of The Earlies.

In 2016, Elephant Stone released their fourth album, Ship of Fools. In 2017, they released an EP, Live at the Verge, and set out on a tour of Europe.

Elephant Stone released their fifth album, Hollow, on February 14, 2020.

== Discography ==
=== Albums ===
- The Seven Seas (2009)
- Elephant Stone (2013)
- The Three Poisons (2014)
- Ship of Fools (2016)
- Hollow (2020)
- Back Into the Dream (2024)
- Back Into the Garage: The Back Into the Dream Demos (2025)
- ASHA (2026)

=== EPs and singles ===
- The Glass Box EP 12" (2010) - mini album
- Love the Sinner, Hate the Sin b/w Strangers 7" (2012)
- American Dream (2020)
- Le voyage de M. Lonely dans la lune (2022)
- Elephant Stone presents "Hollow" (2022)
- Dawn, Day, Dusk (2023)

=== Remixes ===
- ES3PRMX (2015) - Remix of The Three Poisons, cassette
- Remix of Fools (2017) - Remix of Ship of Fools
- GLIDExTDSESRMXv1.1 (2017)- Remix of Glide (The Dream Syndicate)

=== Other appearances ===
- "Christmas Time (Is Here Again)" (Beatles cover) on Psych-Out Christmas (2013)
- "L.A. Woman" on A Psych Tribute to the Doors (2014)

== Awards and nominations ==
Year	Nominee / work	Award	Result
2022	Le voyage de M. Lonely dans la lune	GAMIQ - Rock EP of the Year	Winner
2009	The Seven Seas	Polaris Music Prize - Album of the Year	Long-Listed

== Personnel ==
=== Current band members ===
- Rishi Dhir – lead vocals, bass, sitar
- Miles Dupire-Gagnon – drums, backing vocals
- Robbie MacArthur – guitar, backing vocals
- Jason Kent – keys, guitar, backing vocals

=== Past band members ===
- Bobby Fraser – keys
- Jean-Gabriel Lambert – guitar, backing vocals
- Chris McCarron – guitar
- Mike O'Brien – guitar
- Jules Pampena – drums
- Greg Paquette – guitar
- Robb Surridge – drums
- Richard White – guitar
- Chris Wise – drums
- Stephen "The Venk" Venkatarangam – keys, sitar, bass

== See also ==
- Music of Canada
- Music of Quebec
- Canadian rock
- List of Canadian musicians
- List of bands from Canada
- Category:Canadian musical groups
