= Matthew J. Tow =

Australian musician

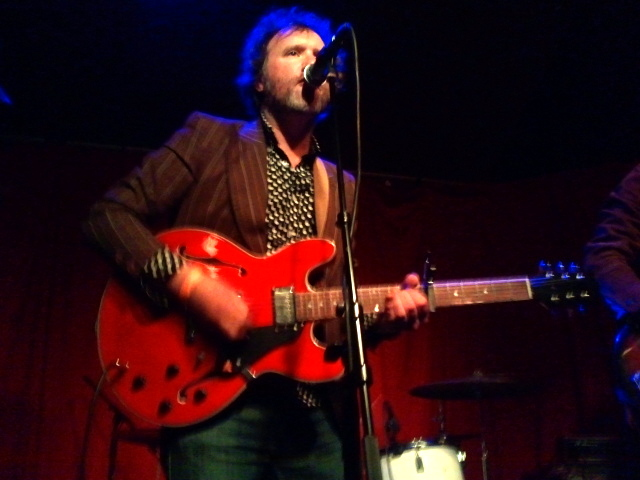
- Tow performing in 2013

Background information
- Also known as: Matt Tow
- Occupations: Musician, songwriter
- Instruments: Guitar, sitar, autoharp, bass guitar, keyboards, glockenspiel
- Years active: 1991–present
- Labels: Red Eye Records, Polydor Records, Universal, The Committee to Keep Music Evil/Bomp!, Undercover/Yep Records, Teepee Records, Cargo, Space Age Recordings, 3rd Stone Records, Summershine/Sub Pop, Planting Seeds Records, Cleopatra Records

Matthew J. Tow is an Australian singer-songwriter and multi-instrumentalist. Perhaps best known as the singer and guitarist of 1990s Sydney indie band Drop City, Tow currently fronts international neo-psychedelic rockers the Lovetones.

== Splash ==
Tow's first experience as a recording artist came with early 1990s Sydney indie band Splash (which also included singer-songwriter Gavin Mclean), who released a four-track EP titled Pendulum in 1991. The Tow–Mclean songwriting partnership would spill over onto early Drop City releases.

== Drop City ==
Tow formed Drop City (also known as Drop City Three) in Sydney at the beginning of 1993. Later that year, they recorded their first album A Revolution of Purely Private Expectations which was released on the Red Eye label through Polydor in 1994. Two more albums were to follow; Yesterday, Today and Tomorrow and, Chiaroscuro. After four albums, a handful of EPs, two Big Day Out appearances and tour support for artists such as the Stone Roses, Stereolab, Yo La Tengo and Manic Street Preachers, Drop City disbanded in late 2000 amid what Tow described as a 'tidal wave of indifference'.

Drop City discography:

Album	Year	Label
A Revolution Of Purely Private Expectations	1994	Red Eye Records, Polydor
Magic Transistor Radio	1995	Red Eye Records, Polydor
This Heavenly Machine	1997	Red Eye Records, Polydor
Yesterday, Today & Tomorrow	1999	Third Stone
The New Situation	2000	Rayman Recordings

== Colorsound ==
In 1994, Tow recorded a solo album You're Only As Good As Your Sound under the moniker of Colorsound which was picked up by Summershine Records in Australia. The following year it was released in the US on Sub Pop. He has since released a further four albums in this guise. These releases are typically instrumental and experimental.

Colorsound Discography:

Album	Year	Label
You're Only As Good As Your Sound	1994	Summershine Records
Soundtrack for an Imaginary Life	1998	Spaceage Recordings
Auspicious Beginnings	2001	Third Stone
You're Only As Good As Your Sound (reissue)	2002	Rayman Recordings
Kaleides into Me	2003	Rayman Recordings
A Higher Station	2004	Rayman Recordings

== Brian Jonestown Massacre ==
In 2003, Tow had the opportunity to join long-time friend Anton Newcombe and his San Francisco–based psychedelic outfit, The Brian Jonestown Massacre, touring the US and the UK with them for three months as a guitarist. He also contributed two songs to their 2003 album ...And This is Our Music. Tow's opening track "Starcleaner" later also appeared on the BJM retrospective Tepid Peppermint Wonderland.

== The Lovetones ==
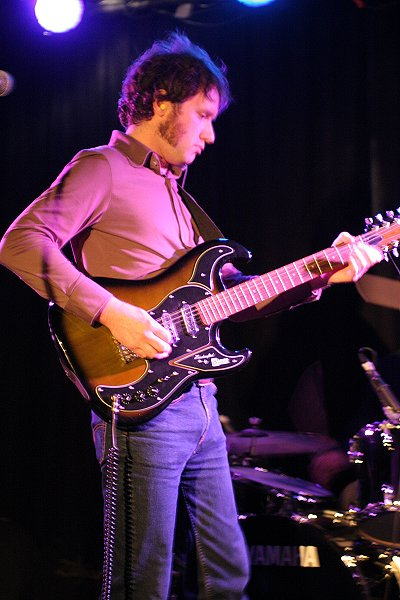
Tow with the Lovetones in 2006

The Lovetones released their debut album, Be What You Want, in 2002 through Bomp! Records. The album was reviewed in Creem and Rolling Stone magazine. The second album, Meditations, was released through New York's Tee Pee Records in late 2005. Returning from shows in the US in late 2005 and also at SXSW 2006, The Lovetones toured to support Meditations' Australian release in May 2006. In June 2006 The Lovetones completed a European tour across 12 countries with The Brian Jonestown Massacre in support of Meditations, released there through Tee Pee/Cargo Records, culminating in an album review in respected UK magazine Uncut. The Lovetones also recorded their third album, Axiom, during 2006 with sessions split between Figment Studios in Hollywood and the Sydney Opera House Recording Studio. The new album was released in June 2007 through Tee Pee Records.

The Lovetones performed a reunion show in Sydney on 31 July 2015. And in 2023 began releasing new singles: "Way the Light Dances", "Everything Changed", and 2024's "Seven Days" (a remake of a track off Matt's first solo album).

The Lovetones discography:

Album	Year	Label
Be What You Want	2003	Committee To Keep Music Evil (U.S.) / Yep! Records (Aus)
Meditations	2005	Tee Pee Records (U.S.) / Yep! Records (Aus)
Axiom	2007	Tee Pee Records (U.S.) / Yep! Records (Aus)
Dimensions	2009	Planting Seeds Records (U.S.)
Lost	2010	Planting Seeds Records (U.S.)
Provenance – Collected Works	2012	Yep! Records, Undercover Music (Aus)

== Personal life ==
Tow is married and lives in Sydney.

His first solo album, The Way of Things, was released in February 2013 and the follow-up, Shadows' Reign, was released in 2016 by Xemu Records.
