= Fist Full of Bees =

Fist Full of Bees may refer to:

- Fist Full of Bees (album), an album by Bride
- Fist Full of Bees (EP), an EP by The Brian Jonestown Massacre
- The painful sensation a baseball batter gets when he is jammed by a pitch
