= Bravery, Repetition and Noise =

Bravery Repetition and Noise

Studio album by The Brian Jonestown Massacre
- Released: October 16, 2001
- Recorded: 2001
- Genre: Psychedelic rock, neo-psychedelia
- Length: 43:29
- Label: Bomp!, The Committee to Keep Music Evil

The Brian Jonestown Massacre chronology
| Bringing It All Back Home – Again (1999) | Bravery Repetition and Noise (2001) | And This Is Our Music (2003) |

Professional ratings
Review scores
| Source | Rating |
|---|---|
| AllMusic | 4/5 stars |
| Pitchfork | 5.8/10 |

Bravery Repetition and Noise is the eighth studio album by American psychedelic rock band The Brian Jonestown Massacre. The album was released in October 16, 2001.

== Writing and production ==
All the songs were written by Anton Newcombe, except the track "Sailor," originally by The Cryan' Shames. The album was produced by Anton Newcombe and Rob Campanella with additional mixing by Courtney Taylor.

== Content ==
The front cover features American independent film director Jim Jarmusch. Incidentally, The Brian Jonestown Massacre's song "Not if You Were the Last Dandy on Earth" appears on the soundtrack to his film Broken Flowers.

== Track listing ==
All songs written by Anton Newcombe, except the track "Sailor," originally by The Cryan' Shames.

1. "Just for Today" – 4:18
2. "Telegram" – 2:33
3. "Stolen" – 1:30
4. "Open Heart Surgery" – 4:19
5. "Nevertheless" – 3:32
6. "Sailor" – 3:43
7. "You Have Been Disconnected" – 3:24
8. "Leave Nothing for Sancho" – 2:56
9. "Let Me Stand Next to Your Flower" – 4:55
10. "If I Love You?" – 2:31
11. "(I Love You) Always" – 3:29
12. "If I Love You? (New European Gold Standard Secret Babylonian Brotherhood Cinema Mix)" – 6:19
13. "If Love Is The Drug, Then I Want To Over-Dose (Bonus Track)" (Japanese edition) – 5:41
14. "New Kind Of Sick (Bonus Track)" (Japanese edition) – 13:04

== Personnel ==
The Brian Jonestown Massacre

- Anton Newcombe – vocals, guitar, bass, mini moog, mellotron, organ, drums, horns
- Jeffrey Davies – guitar, organ, fuzz, vocals
- Rob Campanella – Hammond organ, Mellotron, acoustic guitar, classical guitar, 12-string electric guitar, vox fuzz repeater
- Frankie Emerson – guitar
- Hunter Crowley – drums
- David Koenig – bass
- Bobby Hecksher – guitar
- James Ambrose – vocals, guitar
- Raymond Richards – pedal steel guitar
- Jeff Levitz (credited as Jeff Levitts) – guitar
- Mara Keagle – vocals
- Raugust – flute

Technical personnel

- Courtney Taylor-Taylor – additional mixing
- Mark Chelek – mastering
