= Sarabeth Tucek =

American singer and songwriter

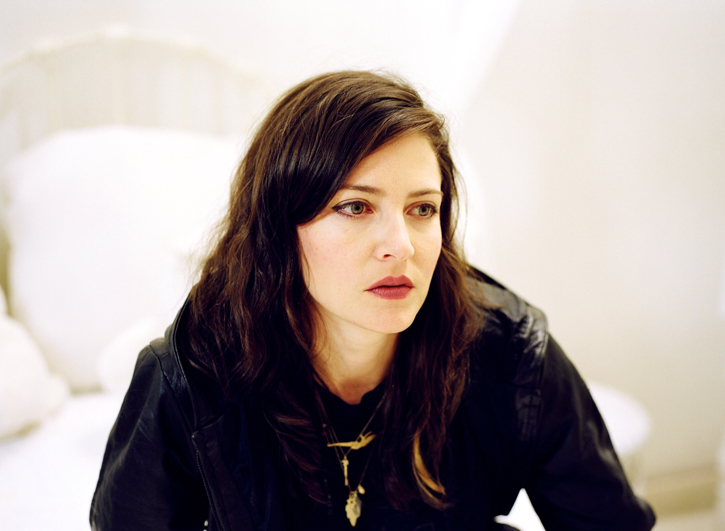

Background information
- Occupations: Musician, songwriter
- Instruments: Vocals, guitar
- Years active: 2003 – present
- Labels: Sonic Cathedral Recordings; The Echo Label
- Website: sarabethtucek.com

Sarabeth Tucek is an American singer and songwriter. Her self-titled first album was released in 2007, with a second album Get Well Soon in 2011.

== Life and career ==
She was born in Miami, Florida, and grew up in Manhattan, New York before moving to Westfield, New Jersey as a teenager. She graduated from Westfield High School. She initially intended a career in acting, only starting to play guitar and write songs after meeting Anton Newcombe of The Brian Jonestown Massacre. After moving to Los Angeles, she made her recording debut in 2003 as background vocalist on a Bill Callahan-produced album, Goodbye Little Doll by EZT (aka Colin Michael Gagon), and on Callahan's own album as (Smog), Supper. One of her earliest live performances is featured in the 2004 rockumentary Dig!, which chronicled the relationship between The Dandy Warhols and the Brian Jonestown Massacre. She also contributed material to Newcombe's 2005 EP release, We Are the Radio. One of Sarabeth's songs on that EP, "Seer," would later be retitled and released in 2006 on the British label Sonic Cathedral Recordings as Tucek's debut single, "Something for You".

She recorded her debut album, Sarabeth Tucek in 2006, with producers Ethan Johns and Luther Russell. The album was released by The Echo Label in 2007. As well as touring solo and with a band, she has toured and performed as a support act with Ray Lamontagne, Black Rebel Motorcycle Club, and Bob Dylan.

Influenced by Dylan, Cat Stevens and Neil Young, her singing voice has been compared to Karen Carpenter and her style to Cat Power and Neil Young. In 2009, after moving from Los Angeles back to her hometown, Sarabeth released an early version of a new song, "The Doctor", on the French label Wool and played some shows in that country. Following a break, she recorded her follow-up album Get Well Soon outside of Philadelphia, once again with Luther Russell at the helm. She contributed several songs to the soundtrack of the film Shit Year, directed by Cam Archer, which went to the Cannes Film Festival in 2010. After appearing on tribute records to artists as diverse as The Cure, Cy Coleman and Roky Erickson, her second album Get Well Soon, dealing with the aftermath of the death of her father, was released in March 2011, following which she toured the UK.

In 2023 she released her third album - "Joan of All" - released on Darkthing Records. This is a double album in terms of length and available on single CD or Vinyl, again produced by Luther Russell and Sarabeth Tucek. On 15 May 2023 she commenced a UK tour in support of the album with a band recruited in the UK - Drums; Rhii Williams, Bass; Charlie Fitzgerald, Keys & guitar; Ryan Rogers, Guitars; Luther Russell. The tour started at Rough Trade West, London, Marc Riley BBC 6 music in Salford, Manchester, Birkenhead, Selby, Newcastle, Glasgow, Kendal, Sheffield, Newport [IOW], Truro, Marlborough, Rough Trade Nottingham, Rough Trade Bristol, Rough Trade East London, Ramsgate, Corsham and finishing in Birmingham on 4 June after nearly a month. These dates were interspersed with promotional work with TV, radio and printed media including Mojo magazine.
