= The Future Is Your Past =

Studio album by the Brian Jonestown Massacre
- Released: February 10, 2023
- Recorded: 2020–2021
- Studios: Berlin, Germany
- Genre: Psychedelic rock
- Length: 39:15
- Language: English
- Label: A Records
- Producer: Anton Newcombe

The Brian Jonestown Massacre chronology
Fire Doesn't Grow on Trees (2022)	The Future Is Your Past (2023)

The Future Is Your Past is the 20th studio album by American psychedelic rock band the Brian Jonestown Massacre. The album was released on February 10, 2023 through A Records.

== Reception ==
According to the review aggregator Metacritic, The Future Is Your Past received "generally favorable reviews" based on a weighted average score of 69 out of 100 from five critic scores. Writing for Clash Music, Nick Roseblade gave this album an 8 out of 10, writing that "every song is absolutely fantastic" and calling it the band's best album in many years and continuing that it "feels like the start of a golden age of The Brian Jonestown Massacre". John Aizlewood of Mojo scored this release 3 out of 5 stars, praising individual tracks, but complaining that the album contains filler. An 8.0 out of 10 was given by The Spill Magazine's Ljubinko Zivkovic, stating that the songs "sound like a band at their most potent". Dan Gourlay of Under the Radar wrote that this album "embraces a multitude of styles and genres without ever allowing itself to be pigeonholed by any particular one" and rated it an 8 out of 10.

== Track listing ==
1. "Do Rainbows Have Ends" – 3:23
2. "Nothing Can Stop the Sound" – 3:29
3. "The Light Is About to Change" – 4:25
4. "Fudge" – 4:31
5. "Cross Eyed Gods" – 3:21
6. "As the Carousel Swings" – 4:58
7. "The Mother of All Fuckers" – 4:49
8. "All the Feels" – 3:09
9. "Your Mind Is My Cafe" – 2:26
10. "Stuck to Yous" – 4:44

== Personnel ==
The Brian Jonestown Massacre

- Anton Newcombe – vocals, guitar
- Hákon Aðalsteinsson – guitar
- Uri Rennert – drums

Additional personnel

- Andrea Wright – mixing

== See also ==
- List of 2023 albums
