= And This Is Our Music =

...And This Is Our Music

Studio album by The Brian Jonestown Massacre
- Released: 7 October 2003
- Genre: Rock
- Length: 54:12; 52:45 (re-release)
- Label: Tee Pee

The Brian Jonestown Massacre chronology
Bravery, Repetition and Noise (2001)	...And This Is Our Music (2003)	Tepid Peppermint Wonderland: A Retrospective (2004)

...And This Is Our Music is the ninth studio album by The Brian Jonestown Massacre, released on October 7, 2003, on Tee Pee Records. It was re-released on A Records, packaged alongside the "If Love Is the Drug, Then I Want to O.D" single, and was distributed in the UK through Cargo Records.

== Reception ==
Professional ratings
Review scores
Source	Rating
AllMusic	4/5 stars
Pitchfork	7.8/10

AllMusic's Jo-Ann Greene called the album "the musical equivalent of a carnival fun house, one never knows what one will find upon opening the door".

== Missing tracks ==
"The Wrong Way" and "The Right Way" appear only on the original pressing of the album. These tracks consist of short answering machine messages left for band leader Anton Newcombe. The first is left by Newcombe's obviously distraught friend, and the second is a far more consoling message from The Out Crowd's Sarah Jane. Permission was never granted to use these from the parties that left the messages, and due to this reason they were removed from subsequent versions of the album and do not appear on the version available for download from the band's website, though they do appear on the digital version available from Amazon and iTunes. The edition on the website also contains different mixes and different vocals on some tracks.

== Track listing ==
All songs written by Anton Newcombe, except where noted.

1. "The Wrong Way" – 0:23
2. "Introesque" – 0:59
3. "Starcleaner" (Matthew J. Tow) – 2:29
4. "Here to Go" – 5:25
5. "When Jokers Attack" – 3:47
6. "Prozac vs. Heroin" – 3:55
7. "Geezers" – 5:18
8. "Maryanne" – 2:05
9. "I Never Told You So" – 2:11
  - Replaced by "What Did You Say?" on the re-release at track 11.
10. "You Look Great When I'm Fucked Up" – 6:51
11. "Here It Comes" – 3:14
12. "Prozac vs. Heroin Revisited" – 4:38
13. "A New Low in Getting High" (Matthew J. Tow) – 3:40
14. "Some Things Go Without Saying" – 2:26
15. "Tschuss" – 4:54
16. "The Pregnancy Test" – 2:19
17. "The Right Way" – 0:48

== Musicians ==
- Anton Newcombe – vocals, guitar, bass, drums, synthesizer
- Rob Campanella – dobro, Mandolin, Hammond Organ
- Frankie Emerson – 12-string and 6-string guitar
- Matthew J. Tow – vocals, Guitar
- Ed Harcourt – vocals ("Here It Comes")
- Dave Koenig – bass ("Geezers")
- Raugust – flute
- Jud Pratt - Trombone ("Geezers")
- Daniel Allaire – drums, Percussion
- Daniella Meeker – vocals ("Here It Comes")
- Joseph Campanella – whistling ("You Look Great When I'm Fucked Up")
- Darren Rademaker – vocals ("Maryanne")
- Kurt Heasley – lead vocal ("Tschuss")
