= Musique de Film Imaginé =

Studio album by The Brian Jonestown Massacre
- Released: April 27, 2015
- Genre: Neo-psychedelia
- Length: 39:34
- Label: A
- Producer: Anton Newcombe

The Brian Jonestown Massacre chronology
Revelation (2014)	Musique de Film Imaginé (2015)	Mini Album Thingy Wingy (2015)

Professional ratings
Aggregate scores
Source	Rating
Metacritic	74/100
Review scores
Source	Rating
AllMusic	4/5 stars
Drowned in Sound	7/10

Musique de Film Imaginé is the fourteenth studio album by The Brian Jonestown Massacre, released on April 27, 2015.

The album is a soundtrack for an imaginary French film and pays homage to the great European film directors of the late 1950s and 1960s such as François Truffaut and Jean-Luc Godard. It includes guest performances from the French multi-instrumentalist SoKo and Italian actress, singer, and director Asia Argento. Musique de Film Imaginé was recorded in Berlin in August 2014.

== Track listing ==
No.	Title	Length
1.	"Après le vin"	3:15
2.	"Philadelphie Story"	4:05
3.	"La Dispute"	3:06
4.	"L' Enfer"	6:03
5.	"Elle s'échappe"	3:03
6.	"Le Cadeau"	1:29
7.	"Le Sacre du Printemps"	6:04
8.	"Le Souvenir"	2:18
9.	"Les Trois Cloches"	0:20
10.	"Bonbon"	1:39
11.	"L' Ennui"	3:03
12.	"Bonbon deux"	1:35
13.	"La Question"	0:38
14.	"Au sommet"	2:57
