= My Bloody Underground =

Studio album by the Brian Jonestown Massacre
- Released: April 15, 2008
- Recorded: August 2007
- Studios: Liverpool, England
- Genres: Neo-psychedelia, shoegazing
- Length: 78:27
- Label: A

The Brian Jonestown Massacre chronology
We Are the Radio (2005)	My Bloody Underground (2008)	Who Killed Sgt. Pepper? (2010)

Professional ratings
Aggregate scores
Source	Rating
Metacritic	51/100
Review scores
Source	Rating
AllMusic	4/5 stars
Drowned in Sound	8/10 stars
Pitchfork	2.6/10
PopMatters	2/10 stars

My Bloody Underground is the tenth studio album by American psychedelic rock band the Brian Jonestown Massacre, released on April 15, 2008 on A Records, a label set up by the band's leader, Anton Newcombe.

== Background ==
My Bloody Underground was recorded at first in Liverpool, England in August 2007; however Newcombe found that the album wasn't working out the way he'd hoped, and so, then decided to record the rest in Reykjavík, Iceland in October 2007.

The title of the album was originally believed to be a homage to the bands My Bloody Valentine, the Velvet Underground, and the Jesus and Mary Chain, being a combination of first two names (similar to the name of the band being a portmanteau of Rolling Stones member Brian Jones and the Jonestown Massacre) and a play on track name "My Little Underground" by the Jesus and Mary Chain. However, in an interview, Anton mentioned that the word "bloody" is used in place of the word "fucking".

Rough mixes of many of the songs from the sessions were first made available on the band's MySpace page, and then as a pre-release download from the official website on September 3, 2007.

== Musical style ==
My Bloody Underground contains more experimental sounds than previous BJM albums, especially with a collaboration with Mark Gardener, formerly of Ride, who co-wrote the song Monkey Powder. The album is a more avant-garde approach to producing and recording. The space rock/neo-psychedelia sound of the album can be attributed to Newcombe's large intake of psychedelic drugs and adopting a "no talking in the studio" policy while recording.

== Music videos ==
The music videos of the songs on the album have also been released on YouTube and as a music video compilation DVD titled Book of Days.

== Track listing ==
My Bloody Underground track listing
No.	Title	Length
1.	"Bring Me the Head of Paul McCartney on Heather Mill's Wooden Peg (Dropping Bombs on the White House)"	6:27
2.	"Infinite Wisdom Tooth / My Last Night in Bed With You"	6:06
3.	"Who Fucking Pissed in My Well?"	4:33
4.	"We Are the Niggers of the World"	5:19
5.	"Who Cares Why?"	8:20
6.	"Yeah - Yeah"	4:29
7.	"Golden Frost"	3:44
8.	"Just Like Kicking Jesus"	4:38
9.	"Ljósmyndir" (Icelandic for "Photographs")	4:08
10.	"Automatic Faggot for the People"	5:46
11.	"Darkwave Driver / Big Drill Car"	7:42
12.	"Monkey Powder"	6:55
13.	"Black Hole Symphony"	10:20
Total length:		78:27
