= Our Music =

Our Music may refer to:

- Notre musique (Our Music), 2004 film by Jean-Luc Godard
- Our Music (album), 2005 album by Burning Spear
- Bokura no Ongaku (Our Music), a Japanese music television show

== See also ==
- This Is Our Music (disambiguation)
