= Mini Album Thingy Wingy =

EP by The Brian Jonestown Massacre
- Released: November, 2015
- Genres: Psychedelic rock; neo-psychedelia; psychedelic folk
- Length: 33:38
- Label: A Recordings
- Producers: Anton Newcombe, Fab Leseure

The Brian Jonestown Massacre chronology
Musique de Film Imaginé (2015)	Mini Album Thingy Wingy (2015)	Third World Pyramid (2016)

Mini Album Thingy Wingy is an EP by American band The Brian Jonestown Massacre. It was released November 2015 under A Recordings.

A music video was produced for the song “Pish.” The video gained over a million views in the 10 years since its release.

== Track listing ==
No.	Title	Length
1.	"Pish"	4:58
2.	"Prší Prší"	4:49
3.	"Get Some"	4:18
4.	"Dust"	4:17
5.	"Leave It Alone"	5:58
6.	"Mandrake Handshake"	3:40
7.	"Here Comes the Waiting for the Sun"	5:58
