= Their Satanic Majesties' Second Request =

Studio album by The Brian Jonestown Massacre
- Released: June 18, 1996
- Recorded: 1995 at Bloody Angle Studios
- Genre: Psychedelic rock; neo-psychedelia; psychedelic folk
- Length: 73:53
- Label: Bomp!; Tangible

The Brian Jonestown Massacre chronology
Take It from the Man! (1996)	Their Satanic Majesties' Second Request (1996)	Thank God for Mental Illness (1996)

Alternative cover
- Reissue cover art

Their Satanic Majesties' Second Request is the fourth studio album by American psychedelic rock band The Brian Jonestown Massacre. It was released on June 18, 1996, by record label Tangible and distributed by Bomp! Records, and is the second of three full-length albums released by the band that year.

== Recording ==
Their Satanic Majesties' Second Request was recorded in 1995 at Bloody Angle Studios.

== Content ==
The album's title and music is influenced by The Rolling Stones' 1967 album Their Satanic Majesties Request.

Their Satanic Majesties' Second Request reveals vast experimentation with Indian drones, sitars, mellotrons, farfisas, didgeridoos, tablas, congas, and glockenspiels. Following in the footsteps of Keith Richards and Brian Jones, BJM capture and explore the psychedelic rock sound of the late 1960s. The opening track, All Around You (Intro), pays tribute to the showmanship of the Stones, calling one and all to the psychedelic trip that they are about to experience.

The song "Donovan Said" is itself a tribute to Donovan's "The Fat Angel", mimicking the vocal patterns of the verse at about a 3/4's of the speed.

== Critical reception ==
Professional ratings
Review scores
Source	Rating
AllMusic	4.5/5 stars

AllMusic's Jason Ankeny wrote: "their music is too rich to be merely retro, and too knowing to be merely slavish – the Stones themselves haven't made a record this strong or entertaining in years."

According to David Chang in Roadrunner, Anthony Bourdain told him that "Anemone" was his favorite song.

== Track listing ==
All songs on the album were written by Anton Newcombe, except for "No Come Down" and "Miss June '75", written by Matt Hollywood.

Side A

1. "All Around You (Intro)" – 5:35
2. "Cold to the Touch" – 3:20
3. "Donovan Said" – 4:42
4. "In India You" – 3:40

Side B

1. "No Come Down" – 5:48
2. "(Around You) Everywhere" – 0:56
3. "Jesus" – 6:30
4. "Before You" – 1:59
5. "Miss June '75" – 7:33

Side C

1. "Anenome" – 5:34
2. "Baby (Prepraise)" – 0:30
3. "Feelers" – 5:27
4. "Bad Baby" – 8:22

Side D

1. "Cause, I Lover" – 1:17
2. "(Baby) Love of My Life" – 1:06
3. "Slowdown (Fuck Tomorrow)/Here It Comes" – 6:46
4. "All Around You (Outro)" – 4:48

== Personnel ==
- Anton Newcombe – guitar, sitar, organ, vocals
- Matt Hollywood – bass, guitar, vocals, backing vocals
- Dean Taylor – guitar
- Joel Gion – percussion
- Brian Glaze – drums
- Mara Keagle – guitar, percussion, vocals ("Anemone"), backing vocals

The liner notes also contain a list of instruments appearing on the album:

"acoustic guitar, sitar, clavs, mellotron, tambora, echoplex-feedback-generator, electric guitar, dumbek, tablas, flute, farfisa, recorder, tape loops, drums, acoustic bass, shinni, chanter, didgeridoo, vox jaguar, French horn, viola, tuba, SMS serge, 12-string electric guitar, harmonium, tambourines, cabasa, conga, jimbe, accordion, celeste, glockenspiel, bells, fish, piano, hammond, cello, wolf horn, maracas, weird-fucking-Chinese-shit, tyco drum, vibes, woodwinds and other top secret crap."
