= Who Killed Sgt. Pepper? =

Studio album by The Brian Jonestown Massacre
- Released: February 23, 2010
- Recorded: 2009
- Studio: Iceland and at Studio East in Berlin
- Genre: Neo-psychedelia; electronic
- Length: 71:36
- Language: English, Icelandic, Russian
- Label: A

The Brian Jonestown Massacre chronology
My Bloody Underground (2008)	Who Killed Sgt. Pepper? (2010)	Aufheben (2012)

Singles from Who Killed Sgt. Pepper?
- 1. "The One" Released: November 23, 2009

Professional ratings
Aggregate scores
Source	Rating
Metacritic	61/100
Review scores
Source	Rating
AllMusic	4/5 stars
Clash	7/10
Consequence of Sound	B
Drowned in Sound	7/10
musicOMH	4/5 stars
NME	8/10 stars
Pitchfork	5.7/10
The Skinny	4/5 stars
Tiny Mix Tapes	1.5/5 stars
Under the Radar	5/10 stars

Who Killed Sgt. Pepper? is the eleventh studio album by American psychedelic rock band The Brian Jonestown Massacre. It was released in February 23, 2010 on band leader Anton Newcombe's A Records.

== Recording ==
The album was recorded in Iceland and at Studio East in Berlin.

== Personnel ==
The album guest features, among a variety of international musicians, Spacemen 3 bassist Will Carruthers and vocalists Unnur Andrea Einarsdottir and Felix Bondareff.

== Content ==
The album's title refers to The Beatles' 1967 album Sgt. Pepper's Lonely Hearts Club Band.

== Release ==
The album was available for free streaming prior to release, and like My Bloody Underground, music videos were made for each of the album's songs.

== Track listing ==
1. "Tempo 116.7 (Reaching for Dangerous Levels of Sobriety)" – 5:25
2. "Þungur hnífur" (Icelandic for "A Heavy Knife") – 4:04
3. "Lets Go Fucking Mental" – 4:41
4. "White Music" – 2:12
5. "This Is the First of Your Last Warnings" (Icelandic version) – 5:59
6. "This Is the One Thing We Did Not Want to Have Happen" – 7:11
7. "The One" – 4:15
8. "Someplace Else Unknown" – 6:23
9. "Detka! Detka! Detka!" (Russian for "Baby") – 5:20
10. "Super Fucked" – 6:36
11. "Our Time" – 2:56
12. "Feel It (Of Course We Fucking Do)" – 6:15
13. "Felt Tipped-Pen Pictures of UFOs" – 10:20

== Personnel ==
- Anton Newcombe – Vocals, guitar, electronics
- Will Carruthers – Bass, vocals (tracks 3, 6)
- Matt Hollywood – Guitar
- Unnur Andrea Einarsdottir – Vocals (tracks 5, 7)
- Felix Bondareff – Vocals (tracks 2, 9)
- Jón Sæmundur – Guitar
- Henrik Baldvin Bjornsson – Guitar
- Constantine Karlis – Drums

=== Weekly charts ===
Weekly chart performance for Who Killed Sgt. Pepper?
Chart (2010)	Peak position
French Albums (SNEP)	199
