= Revelation (The Brian Jonestown Massacre album) =

Studio album by The Brian Jonestown Massacre
- Released: May 19, 2014
- Recorded: 2012–2014
- Studio: Berlin, Germany
- Genre: Neo-psychedelia
- Length: 57:39
- Label: A
- Producer: Anton Newcombe

The Brian Jonestown Massacre chronology
Aufheben (2012)	Revelation (2014)	Musique de Film Imaginé (2015)

Professional ratings
Aggregate scores
Source	Rating
Metacritic	71/100
Review scores
Source	Rating
AllMusic	3.5/5 stars
NME	7/10 stars

Revelation is the thirteenth studio album by The Brian Jonestown Massacre. It was released in May 2014 on band leader Anton Newcombe's A Records label. Recorded between late 2012 and early 2014, it is the first album to be fully recorded and produced at Anton Newcombe's recording studio in Berlin. It peaked at number 135 on the UK album chart.

== Track listing ==
1. "Vad Hände Med Dem?" – 4:41 (co-writer Joakim Åhlund)
2. "What You Isn't" – 5:29
3. "Unknown" – 1:56
4. "Memory Camp" – 5:39
5. "Days, Weeks and Moths" – 4:20
6. "Duck and Cover" – 4:43
7. "Food for Clouds" – 5:18
8. "Second Sighting" – 3:41
9. "Memorymix" – 4:36
10. "Fist Full Of Bees" – 5:46
11. "Nightbird" – 3:26
12. "Xibalba" – 3:23
13. "Goodbye (Butterfly)" – 4:42

== Fist Full of Bees (EP) ==
Fist Full of Bees is an EP was released in 2013 and also produced by Anton Newcombe. Two of its three songs were later included on the album.

=== Track listing ===
1. "Fist Full of Bees"
2. "Food for Clouds"
3. "Everything Fades to White"

=== Weekly charts ===
Weekly chart performance for Revelation
Chart (2014)	Peak position
Belgian Albums (Ultratop Wallonia)	137
