= Something Else (The Brian Jonestown Massacre album) =

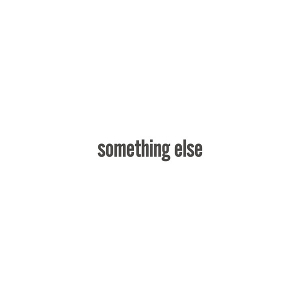

Studio album by The Brian Jonestown Massacre
- Released: June 1, 2018
- Length: 39:55
- Label: A Records

The Brian Jonestown Massacre chronology
Don't Get Lost (2017)	Something Else (2018)	The Brian Jonestown Massacre (2019)

Professional ratings
Aggregate scores
Source	Rating
Metacritic	69/100
Review scores
Source	Rating
AllMusic	3.5/5 stars

Something Else is the seventeenth studio album by American band The Brian Jonestown Massacre. It was released in June 2018 under A Recordings.

== Track listing ==
No.	Title	Length
1.	"Hold That Thought"	4:47
2.	"Animal Wisdom"	3:34
3.	"Psychic Lips"	3:49
4.	"Skin and Bones"	3:18
5.	"My Poor Heart"	3:49
6.	"My Love"	5:40
7.	"Who Dreams of Cats?"	3:34
8.	"Fragmentation"	3:08
9.	"Silent Stream"	8:16
