= This Is Our Music =

This Is Our Music is the name of two albums:

- This Is Our Music (Ornette Coleman album)
- This Is Our Music (Galaxie 500 album)

== See also ==
- Our Music (disambiguation)
