= The Brian Jonestown Massacre (album) =

Studio album by The Brian Jonestown Massacre
- Released: March 15, 2019
- Genre: Neo-psychedelia
- Length: 37:59
- Label: A Recordings

The Brian Jonestown Massacre chronology
Something Else (2018)	The Brian Jonestown Massacre (2019)	Fire Doesn't Grow on Trees (2022)

Professional ratings
Aggregate scores
Source	Rating
Metacritic	73/100
Review scores
Source	Rating
MusicOMH	4/5 stars

The Brian Jonestown Massacre is the eighteenth studio album by American band The Brian Jonestown Massacre. It was released in March 2019 under A Recordings.

== Track listing ==
No.	Title	Length
1.	"Drained"	3:43
2.	"Tombes Oubliées"	4:26
3.	"My Mind Is Filled with Stuff"	3:35
4.	"Cannot Be Saved"	3:58
5.	"A Word"	5:33
6.	"We Never Had a Chance"	6:11
7.	"Too Sad to Tell You"	3:30
8.	"Remember Me This"	2:50
9.	"What Can I Say"	4:13
Total length:		37:59

== Charts ==
Chart (2019)	Peak position
Scottish Albums (OCC)	34
