= Broken Flowers =

2005 French-American comedy-drama film by Jim Jarmusch

- Theatrical release poster
- Directed by: Jim Jarmusch
- Written by: Jim Jarmusch
- Story by: Bill Raden; Sara Driver
- Produced by: Jon Kilik; Stacey Smith
- Starring: Bill Murray; Jeffrey Wright; Sharon Stone; Frances Conroy; Jessica Lange; Tilda Swinton; Julie Delpy; Mark Webber; Chloë Sevigny; Christopher McDonald; Alexis Dziena
- Cinematography: Frederick Elmes
- Edited by: Jay Rabinowitz
- Music by: Mulatu Astatke
- Production companies: Five Roses; BAC Films
- Distributed by: Focus Features (United States); BAC Films Distribution (France)
- Release dates: May 16, 2005 (Cannes); August 5, 2005 (United States)
- Running time: 101 minutes
- Countries: United States; France
- Language: English
- Budget: $10 million
- Box office: $47.3 million

Broken Flowers is a 2005 comedy-drama film written and directed by Jim Jarmusch and produced by Jon Kilik and Stacey Smith. A co-production between France and the United States, the film focuses on an aging "Don Juan" who embarks on a cross-country journey to track down four of his former lovers after receiving an anonymous letter stating that he has a son. The film stars Bill Murray, Jeffrey Wright, Sharon Stone, Frances Conroy, Jessica Lange, Tilda Swinton, Julie Delpy, Mark Webber, Chloë Sevigny, Christopher McDonald, and Alexis Dziena.

The film was nominated for the Palme d'Or at the 2005 Cannes Film Festival and won the Grand Prix. It received generally positive reviews from critics and grossed $47.3 million worldwide on a $10 million budget.

== Plot ==
Don Johnston, a former Don Juan who made a small fortune in the computer industry, wants to live in quiet retirement. He is content to lounge around watching old movies and listening to classical or easy listening music. His current girlfriend, Sherry, is ending their relationship and moving out of his house when a letter in a pink envelope arrives.

Later Don reads the letter; it purports to be from an unnamed former girlfriend, informing him that he has a son who is nearly nineteen years old, and who may be looking for him. Initially, Don does not intend to do anything about it, but his busybody neighbor Winston, who is a mystery novel enthusiast, urges Don to investigate. Winston researches the current locations of the five women most likely to have written the letter and gives Don the information along with maps and flight reservations, and persuades him to visit them.

Ultimately Don meets with four women (the fifth one had died before the events of the film), each encounter worse than the last and each woman damaged in some way:

- Laura works as a closet and drawer organizer and is the widow of a race car driver. She is very warm and receptive to Don's visit, but has an uninhibited daughter, Lolita, who walks around the house without any clothes on before her mother arrives. Both mom and daughter are oblivious to the implications of the name "Lolita". That night, Laura sleeps with Don.
- Dora is a realtor. Once a "flower child" of the 1960s, she is now living a suburban conservative upper-middle class existence married to Ron. The couple sell neatly prefabricated houses and serve Don a meal of similar construction and character. The encounter, while friendly on the surface, belies a great deal of tension with Ron coming across as threatening, and Dora as pained and nervous.
- Carmen Markowski works as an "animal communicator". Don recalls how she was formerly so passionate about becoming a lawyer. She is cold to Don and seems to have a close relationship with her secretary, who is very protective of her and unimpressed by Don's sudden visit.
- Penny lives in a rural area amongst bikers. She appears to still harbor a great deal of resentment toward Don, and when he asks if she has a son, she becomes furious. Two men appear and beat Don up. The next morning, Don finds himself in his car, in the middle of a field, with a nasty cut near his left eye.

Later, Don stops at a florist to buy flowers from a young woman named Sun Green who treats his cut. Don leaves the flowers at the grave of the fifth woman, Michelle Pepe.

Finally, Don returns home where he finds a pink letter from Sherry, admitting she still likes him. He discusses the trip and second letter with Winston, who theorizes that Sherry might have written the original letter as a hoax. He then goes home to compare the two letters.

Don then meets a young man in the street (who was seen earlier) whom he suspects may be his son. He buys him a meal, but when he remarks that the young man believes that Don is his father, the young man becomes agitated and flees. Don attempts to chase the man but gives up, standing in the middle of a crossroads. Don watches a Volkswagen Beetle drive past and sees in it a young man (Note: Played by Bill Murray's son, Homer Murray) who resembles him. The young man wears the same type of Fred Perry tracksuit as Don and makes eye contact with him, while the same music Don had listened to on his trip plays from the passing car.

== Cast ==
- Bill Murray as Don Johnston
- Jeffrey Wright as Winston
- Sharon Stone as Laura
- Frances Conroy as Dora
- Jessica Lange as Carmen
- Tilda Swinton as Penny
- Julie Delpy as Sherry
- Mark Webber as The Kid
- Chloë Sevigny as Carmen's assistant
- Christopher McDonald as Ron
- Alexis Dziena as Lolita
- Larry Fessenden as Will
- Chris Bauer as Dan
- Pell James as Sun Green
- Heather Alicia Simms as Mona
- Brea Frazier as Rita

== Production ==
The ending of the story was left deliberately unresolved. Director Jim Jarmusch had each of the four female leads write their own pink paper letter "in character" to plant in each one's mind the possibility that she was the mother of Don's supposed son. The letter used in the film was a composite of the four. In relation to the ending, Jarmusch said that the film is about "yearning for something that you're missing and not necessarily being able to define what it is".

Murray said in a 2019 interview with the Associated Press that he requested to Jarmusch that the film be shot in locations within an hour of his house; Jarmusch complied with Murray's wishes, adding that Murray "gave us limitations that helped us."

Slates for the film shown on the DVD extra "Broken Flowers: Start to Finish" list the title of the film as Dead Flowers.

The film is dedicated to French director Jean Eustache. In an interview, Jarmusch said he felt close to Eustache for his commitment to making films in a unique and independent fashion.

=== Lawsuit ===
Reed Martin sued Jarmusch in March 2006, claiming that the director stole the film's concept from a very similar script that had circulated among several people eventually involved in the production. Jarmusch denied the charges and stated in response that Martin's claim has "absolutely no merit". On September 28, 2007, a federal district court judge dismissed Martin's lawsuit.

== Release ==
Broken Flowers premiered in Europe at 2005 Cannes Film Festival on May 16, 2005. It opened on August 5, 2005, in the US in a limited release. It was released on video January 3, 2006.

=== Box office ===
The film was released theatrically on August 5, 2005, earning $780,408 from 27 theaters. After 15 weeks in release, the movie ended with a domestic total of $13,744,960. The film fared much better internationally, taking in $32,975,531 to bring its total gross to $46,720,491.

=== Critical reception ===
At the 2005 Cannes Film Festival, the film was nominated for the Palme d'Or and won the Grand Prix. Review aggregator Rotten Tomatoes reports that 87% of 194 surveyed critics wrote a positive review, with an average rating of 7.49/10. The site's critical consensus reads: "Bill Murray's subtle and understated style complements director Jim Jarmusch's minimalist storytelling in this quirky, but deadpan comedy." On Metacritic, the film had an average score of 79 out of 100, based on 39 reviews from film critics, indicating "generally favorable" reviews.

According to Ken Tucker, "Broken Flowers relies on Bill Murray's persona, but it also turns that persona back on him. Instead of maintaining the satirical distance that made it easy to laugh at heartland eccentrics in, say, Alexander Payne's About Schmidt, Jarmusch's film avoids caricature, and Murray's poker face melts. Don feels a bittersweet regret at becoming exactly the sort of granite-faced wise guy Bill Murray has made his rep at enshrining. Murray is at a point in his career when his self-effacement has achieved high comic art, and he collaborates with Jarmusch at a point in his career when he's trying to be something more than hipster-serene. Both succeed, by committing to the notion that a yearning to be reborn within a hopeless, brittle soul is worthy of drama—as well as a deeper, gentler humor."

Peter Bradshaw called it "Jarmusch's most enjoyable, accessible work for some time, perhaps his most emotionally generous film - like Cronenberg, he has made a bold venture into the mainstream with a movie that creates a gentle cloud of happiness. It is, it must be said, a lot more forgiving about aging men than Alexander Payne's road-movies About Schmidt or Sideways, but it is still a very attractive piece of film-making, bolstered by terrific performances from an all-star cast, spearheaded by endlessly droll, seductively sensitive Bill Murray."

== Soundtrack ==
Music from Broken Flowers

Soundtrack album by Mulatu Astatke
- Released: August 2, 2005
- Genres: Jazz, rock, pop, soul, reggae, classical
- Length: 38:01
- Label: Decca

Professional ratings
Review scores
Source	Rating
Allmusic	link

The soundtrack to the film features an eclectic mix of music, chiefly using instrumentals by Ethiopian jazz artist Mulatu Astatke as the main score, mixed with garage rock (The Brian Jonestown Massacre, The Greenhornes, Holly Golightly), stoner metal (Sleep), soul (Marvin Gaye), rocksteady reggae (The Tennors), and classical (Gabriel Fauré's Requiem). The film's score was composed by Mulatu Astatke.

1. "There Is an End" (Holly Golightly with The Greenhornes) - 3:05
2. "Yegelle Tezeta" (Mulatu Astatke) - 3:14
3. "Ride Yu Donkey" (The Tennors) - 2:03
4. "I Want You" (Marvin Gaye) - 3:57
5. "Yekermo Sew" (Mulatu Astatke) - 4:03
6. "Not If You Were the Last Dandy on Earth" (The Brian Jonestown Massacre) - 2:49
7. "Tell Me Now So I Know" (Holly Golightly) - 2:02
  - Written by Ray Davies
8. "Gubèlyé" (Mulatu Astatke) - 4:35
9. "Dopesmoker" (Sleep) - 3:57
  - Abridged version of 63:31-minute track.
10. Requiem in D minor, Op. 48 ("Pie Jesu") (Oxford Camerata) - 3:30
  - Composed by Gabriel Fauré, fourth of seven-movement work.
11. "Ethanopium" (Dengue Fever) - 4:38
  - Instrumental, composed by Mulatu Astatke
12. "Unnatural Habitat" (The Greenhornes) - 2:08

Other songs in the film

Several songs in the film are not on the soundtrack album. They include:

- "Dreams" by The Allman Brothers Band
- "El Bang Bang" - Jackie Mittoo
- "Playboy Cha-Cha" - Mulatu Astatke
- "Mascaram Setaba" - Mulatu Astatke
- "Aire" (Pavan A 5 in C Minor) composed by William Lawes, performed by Fretwork
- "Fantasy" (A 6 in F Major) composed by William Lawes, performed by Fretwork
- "Alone in the Crowd" - Mulatu Astatke
