= Miranda Lee Richards =

American singer-songwriter (born 1975)

- Born: April 4, 1975 (age 51); San Francisco, California
- Occupations: Singer; songwriter
- Website: mirandaleerichards.com.

Miranda Lee Richards (born April 4, 1975) is an American singer-songwriter.

Her 2001 release The Herethereafter included original compositions such as "The Beginner", and a cover of The Rolling Stones' 1967 single "Dandelion". Her single "The Long Goodbye" reached the top five in Japan, and its music video was in heavy rotation on MTV Japan.

Richards grew up in San Francisco, the daughter of comic book artists Ted and Teresa Richards. She attended San Francisco's Ruth Asawa School of the Arts, and then took up modeling after graduation. She moved to Paris to continue her modeling career, but "hated" it and moved back to San Francisco. She met Kirk Hammett of Metallica through a friend, David Deresinski and he gave her guitar lessons and taught her to play Mazzy Star songs. She recorded some demos in her basement, which reached the ears of Anton Newcombe of The Brian Jonestown Massacre, which she joined briefly. After leaving them, she moved to Los Angeles, while she met the many musicians who would contribute to her debut.

She has also worked with Joe Firstman, and was reported to appear on several tracks on an upcoming Tricky release. In 2010, she was featured on the Delerium album Voice (An Acoustic Collection). She has also performed with The Good Listeners and The Jesus and Mary Chain.

Her "musical heroes" include Neil Young, John Lennon, The Rolling Stones, Blondie, Mazzy Star, Beck, and Chrissie Hynde. She also enjoys trip-hop bands including Massive Attack and the DJ culture of beat-making, the influence of which is apparent on The Herethereafter.

Her studio album Echoes of the Dreamtime was released on 29 January 2016 on London-based record label Invisible Hands Music. Existential Beast was released on June 16, 2017, also on Invisible Hands.

== Discography ==
- The Herethereafter (Virgin Records, 2001)
- Early November EP (2008)
- Light of X (Nettwerk Records, 2009)
- Echoes of the Dreamtime (Invisible Hands Music, 2016)
- Existential Beast (Invisible Hands Music, 2017)
