= Dig! =

- Theatrical release poster
- Directed by: Ondi Timoner
- Written by: Ondi Timoner
- Produced by: Ondi Timoner
- Starring: Anton Newcombe; Courtney Taylor-Taylor
- Cinematography: Vasco Nunes; David Timoner; Ondi Timoner
- Edited by: Ondi Timoner
- Production companies: Interloper Films; Celluloid Dreams
- Distributed by: Palm Pictures
- Release date: 18 January 2004
- Running time: 107 min.
- Country: United States
- Language: English
- Box office: $228,828

Dig! is a 2004 American documentary film by Ondi Timoner.

== Summary ==
The film explores the collision of art and commerce through the eyes of psychedelic rock groups The Dandy Warhols and The Brian Jonestown Massacre, focusing on the developing careers and the love-hate relationship of the bands' respective frontmen Courtney Taylor-Taylor and Anton Newcombe. It was shot over eight years (1996–2003) and compiled from over 2,500 hours of footage.

== Cast ==
The Brian Jonestown Massacre

- Anton Newcombe
- Jeffrey Davies
- Joel Gion
- Matt Hollywood
- Peter Hayes
- Dean Taylor

The Dandy Warhols

- Courtney Taylor-Taylor
- Peter Holmström
- Zia McCabe
- Brent DeBoer
- Eric Hedford

Additional cast

- David LaChapelle - photographer
- Genesis P-Orridge – commentator
- Adam Shore – commentator
- Miranda Lee Richards – musician
- David Deresinski – manager
- Harry Dean Stanton - actor

== Reception and legacy ==
The film was generally very well received critically. It currently has an approval rating of 89% on review aggregator website Rotten Tomatoes, based on 70 reviews, with an average rating of 7.8/10. The website's critical consensus reads, "So you wanna be a rock 'n' roll star? Dig! compellingly chronicles the ups and downs of the Dandy Warhols and the Brian Jonestown Massacre, two ambitious bands whose love/hate relationship embodies many of the potential pratfalls of the music business." On Metacritic, the film has a weighted average score of 76 out of 100, based on 28 critics, indicating "generally favorable" reviews.

BBC Movies called it "[e]rratic, tragic, and absolutely hilarious", saying, "Dig! is fantastic filmmaking" that "works as both a savagely funny rockumentary and a sardonic comment on the politics of selling out." An Empire review described its subject as the "microcosm of ‘indie’ music on the cusp of corporate take-over" and the film as "the perfect parable of the 1990s music industry" portraying a "riveting... mêlée of spiraling egos", also giving it a five-star rating.

Allmovie, while giving the film a generally positive review, criticized the film's emphasis, writing "DIG! isn't as concerned with differences in the groups' musical styles (few songs are heard for more than a few bars at a time) as it is with personalities and interpersonal conflict. In this regard, it echoes the purportedly superficial concerns of the fickle industry it depicts, and it's not entirely clear whether this is Timoner's intent [...] In the end, the music should matter more than it apparently does."

PopMatters gave the film a mixed review, commenting that "The film is less effective at conveying the genius of Anton Newcombe than the madness, possibly because the latter only requires a camera and Anton himself" but ultimately called it "fascinating" as a "behind-the-music-scenes glimpse".

It won the Documentary Grand Jury Prize at the 2004 Sundance Film Festival and was acquired by the Museum of Modern Art for their permanent collection.

Dave Grohl of Foo Fighters Fame declared Dig! as "his favorite horror film" while actor Jonah Hill also is a fan of the film. A digitally remastered extended cut, which premiered at Sundance's 40th Anniversary under the new title Dig! XX, adds an additional 40 minutes of footage.

=== Reactions from band members ===
Taylor-Taylor, Newcombe and Warhols guitarist Peter Holmström have all criticized the film as being unfair in its portrayal of Newcombe and The Brian Jonestown Massacre. On The Brian Jonestown Massacre's official website the film was denounced as reducing several years of hard work to "at best a series of punch-ups and mishaps taken out of context, and at worst bold faced lies and misrepresentation of fact."

Courtney Taylor-Taylor said in an interview: "It's a movie, not a documentary [...] She worked her ass off and forged a plot when there was no plot. She crafted the thing to swell and ebb by taking eight years of us and a year and a half of the Brian Jonestown Massacre". Holmstrom was generally displeased with the film initially, citing Timoner's use of footage that he claims "was not to be used" as a reason, but has maintained that "it's still a good film", though one "I would have done differently". Dandy Warhols drummer Brent DeBoer noted the film could have easily been a "feel-good story", but instead a few rare moments were specifically chosen to give the film a "Jerry Springer"-type storyline.

Awards
Preceded by Capturing the Friedmans	Sundance Grand Jury Prize: Documentary; 2004	Succeeded by Why We Fight
