= Ricky Maymi =

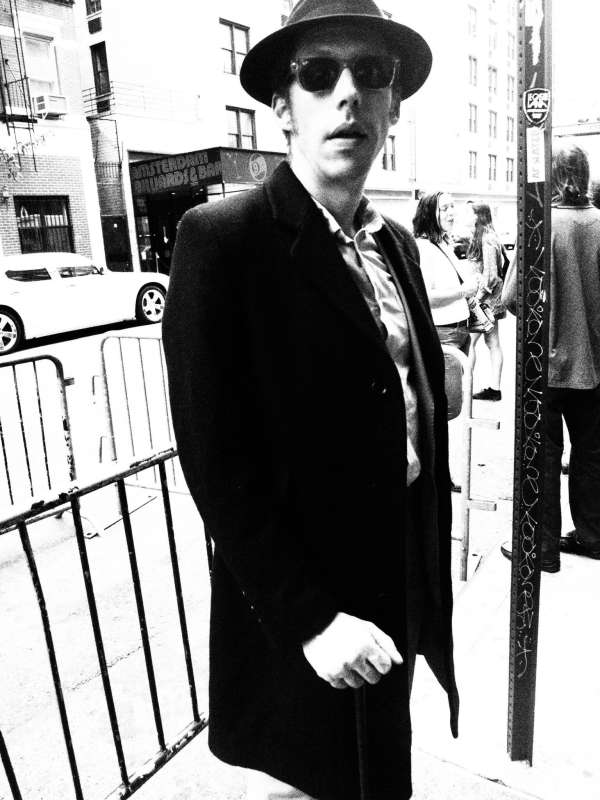

Background information
- Born: September 15, 1972 (age 53)
- Origin: San Francisco, California, U.S.
- Occupation: Musician
- Instruments: Guitar; bass; drums

Ricky Rene Maymi (/ˈmaɪmiː/) is an American rock musician, best known as an original member of the psychedelic rock band The Brian Jonestown Massacre.

== The Brian Jonestown Massacre ==
A founding member and original drummer of The Brian Jonestown Massacre, he then switched to guitar and finally on to bass guitar before leaving the band in 1993. He rejoined as 12-string guitarist in 2003.

== Other projects ==
In 2013 Maymi toured with psychedelic shoegaze band LSD and the Search for God and The Telescopes as a guitarist and in Canada as a drummer with Flavor Crystals.

Maymi has collaborated with Liverpool's The Wild Swans, fronted by Paul Simpson and has worked with Steve Kilbey of The Church.

Kilbey and Maymi recorded the album The Wilderness Years by David Neil, released in July 2011. The David Neil of the title is a fictional rock star "from days past" described in press material as the project's original songwriter. This pseudonym was created, Maymi has explained, as a means for the duo to achieve "creative liberation by not exactly having to be 'ourselves'".

Maymi has also performed and recorded alongside Kilbey in Underground Lovers guitarist Glenn Bennie's collaborative musical project GB3, for the Damaged/Controlled album, released in 2010 on Australian label Rubber Records. Kilbey and Maymi have also performed together in The Triffids for their "Secret In The Shape Of A Song" concerts in tribute to the late Triffids vocalist David McComb which took place in Sydney (2008), Melbourne (2008) and Perth (2009).

Maymi recorded and performed with the San Francisco-based rock band Mellow Drunk featuring Leigh Gregory from 2001 to 2009 and is a founding member of the neo-psychedelic/surrealist rock band The Imajinary Friends, which he continues to work with today. The lineup of The Imajinary Friends spawned from the initial lineup of The BJM. The band currently includes Travis Threlkel (of Tipsy, and formerly of the BJM) and Tim Digulla (of Tipsy).

Maymi added his magic to a project with old friends Sean Curran from The Sickerthings and Justin Welch from Elastica The band is The Stalwart lovers and their debut album, Love Songs From A Broken Heart, was released on April 18th 2025.
