= Joel Gion =

American rock percussionist

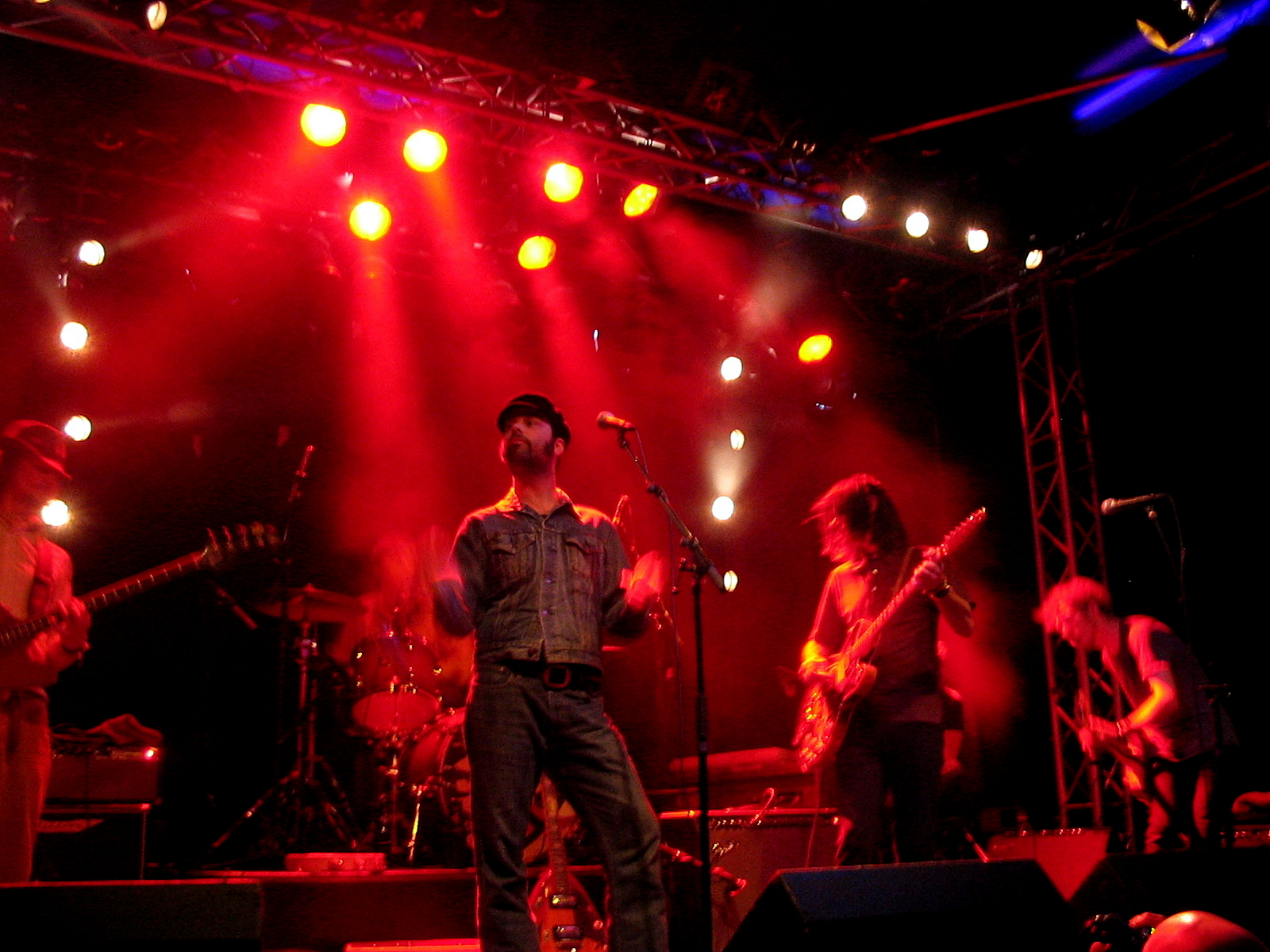
- Joel Gion (centre) performing with The Brian Jonestown Massacre

Background information
- Born: November 20, 1970 (age 55)
- Genres: Psychedelic rock; experimental; anti-folk; shoegaze; folk
- Instruments: Percussion; guitar; vocals
- Years active: 1994–present
- Labels: Bomp! Records; TVT Records; Tee Pee Records; A Records; The Reverberation Appreciation Society

Joel Gion (/ɡiːˈɒn/; born 1970 or 1971 (age 55–56) is an American musician, best known as the tambourine player for the psychedelic rock band The Brian Jonestown Massacre.

He was a guest star on the U.S. television show Gilmore Girls, where he played the tambourine in the fictitious band Hep Alien.

== The Brian Jonestown Massacre ==
He appeared in the 2004 documentary Dig! along with the rest of the Brian Jonestown Massacre, and is featured prominently on the cover of the DVD of the same film. His image is also on the cover of the Brian Jonestown Massacre album Thank God For Mental Illness (and a very distended image of him can be seen on Give It Back!). He is the second longest-serving member of the Brian Jonestown Massacre, after band leader Anton Newcombe.

He rejoined The Brian Jonestown Massacre for their 2006 tour and still plays tambourine and maracas with the band.

== Solo ==
In 2011 Gion released his first solo vinyl EP "Extended Play". In 2012, Gion released the single "Yes" as an advance of his upcoming solo album, which was due to be released in 2014. At the end of 2013, he formed a new group, Joel Gion & The Primary Colours, made up of Gion on guitar, percussion and vocals, Brian Jackson (guitar), Derek See (guitar and vocals), Galine Tumasova (bass, vocals), Raul Sanchez (drums), Yvonne Hernandez (percussion), and Kevin Wood (keyboards).

In August 2014, Gion released a solo album named Apple Bonkers on August 18 (UK) and 19 (US). The album is co-produced by members of the Brian Jonestown Massacre, Collin Hegna and Rob Campanelle, featuring actual (Daniel Allaire and Matt Hollywood) and former (Jeffrey Davies and Miranda Lee Richards) members of the Brian Jonestown Massacre, members of the Dandy Warhols (Pete Holmstrom), Dead Skeletons (Ryan Van Kriedt) and Warlocks (Jason Anchondo). The album is mainly composed of classic 1960s sounds, with influences from shoegaze, post-punk, psychedelia, alt-country and mod/beat music.

In November 2017, Gion released his eponymous titled album "Joel Gion" with a more personalized take on lounge in psychedelia.

In February 2024, Gion published In the Jingle Jangle Jungle, a memoir telling the story of the first ten years of The Brian Jonestown Massacre.

== Discography ==
- EP (2011) Goingion
- Apple Bonkers (2014) The Reverberation Appreciation Society
- Joel Gion (2017) Beyond Beyond Is Beyond Records
