= Jeffrey Davies (guitarist) =

American rock musician

Jeffrey Davies (born 1967 in Washington, D.C.) is an American rock musician best known as the original lead guitarist of the psychedelic rock band The Brian Jonestown Massacre. Davies is featured in the documentary Dig! by Ondi Timoner, as an active touring member of The Brian Jonestown Massacre. Davies co-wrote the theme song with Anton Newcombe for the HBO series 'Boardwalk Empire': "Straight Up and Down" from the 1996 album "Take It from the Man!" He played in the band from 1992 to 1999. He rejoined the band in 2001 only to quit again in 2003. Spending much of his early years in Washington D.C., Davies' family moved to New Mexico where he spent his teen years before eventually moving to San Francisco. It was while in San Francisco that he become a member of The Brian Jonestown Massacre, having replaced Patrick Straczek and appearing on the majority of their recordings. Davies has appeared as a guest guitarist and instrumentalist for the LA-based neo-psych experimental collective Kill Kill Kill.
