= The Brian Jonestown Massacre =

American rock band

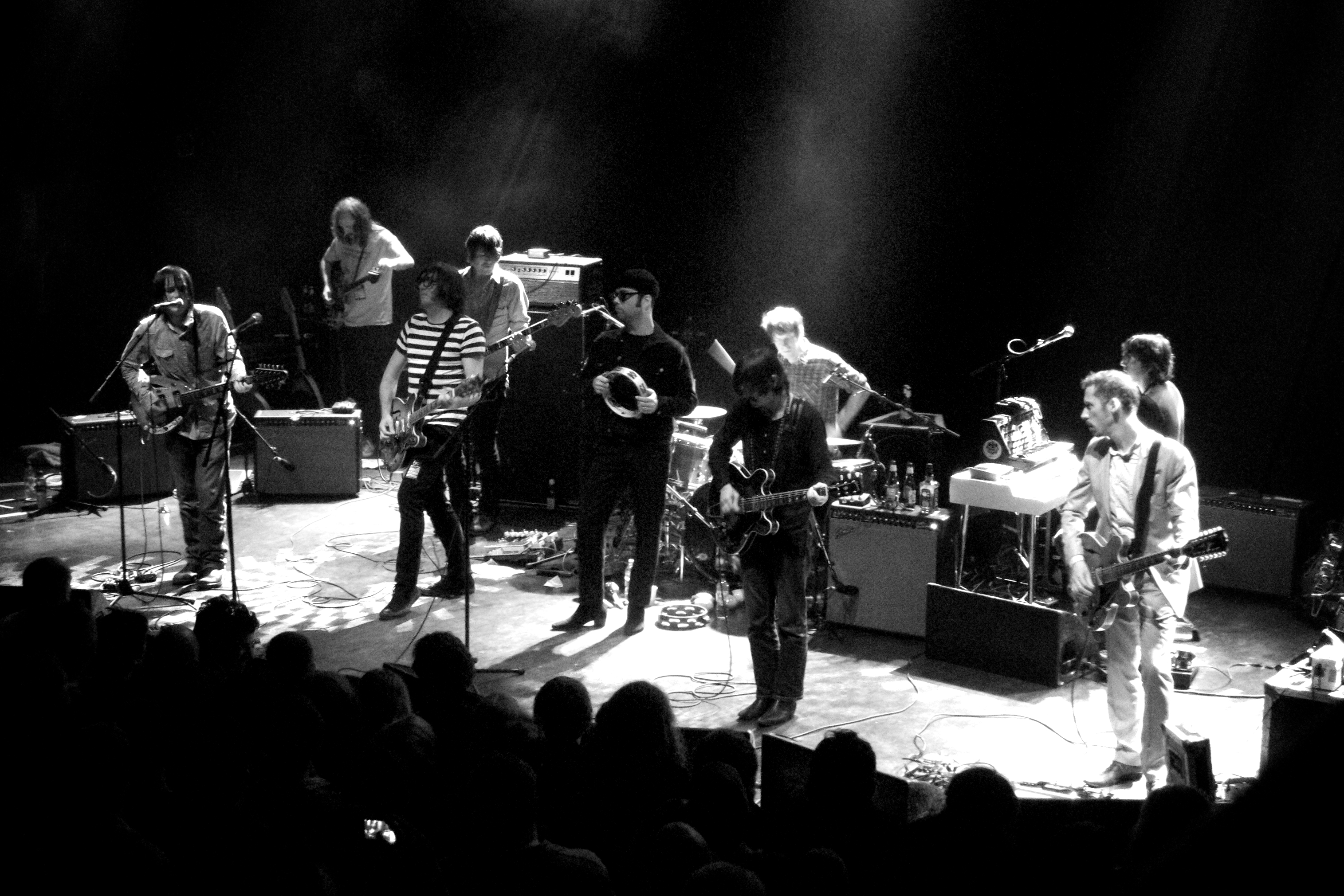
- The Brian Jonestown Massacre performing at Shepherd's Bush Empire, London, in 2012

Background information
- Origin: San Francisco, California, U.S.
- Genres: Psychedelic rock; garage rock; shoegaze; neo-psychedelia; folk rock
- Years active: 1990–present
- Labels: Bomp!; TVT; Tee Pee
- Members: Anton Newcombe; Hallberg Daði Hallbergsson; Ricky Maymi; Joel Gion; Hákon Aðalsteinsson; Tobias Humble; Emil Nikolaisen
- Past members: See Former members
- Website: thebrianjonestownmassacre.com

The Brian Jonestown Massacre is an American rock band founded and led by Anton Newcombe. It was formed in San Francisco in 1990 and has featured a revolving cast of members since forming.

Initially influenced by shoegaze and dream pop on their first two albums, the band would eventually shift towards a sound influenced by 1960s psychedelic rock and garage rock on their third album, Take It from the Man!. The collective has released 20 studio albums, six compilation albums, five live albums, 14 EPs and 24 singles, as well as two various-artist compilation albums to date.

The group has gained media notoriety for their tumultuous working relationships as well as the erratic behavior of Newcombe. The group received further notoriety when they were the subject of the 2004 documentary film called Dig!.

== History ==
=== 1990–1996: early years ===
The collective was founded by Anton Newcombe in San Francisco, California between 1990 and 1993. Their first albums were compilations of recording sessions and an early demo tape, titled Pol Pot's Pleasure Penthouse. This release became a popular bootleg.

The band recorded Spacegirl and Other Favorites in 1993, compiled from what Newcombe called his "studio trash". The album includes "Hide and Seek", which was released as a single in 1994. The band's debut album, Methodrone, was released in 1995 and developed largely out of the concepts explored on Spacegirl. It was heavily influenced by the shoegaze genre that had gained prominence several years prior to its release, and the album's ethereal rock sound is comparable to bands such as Galaxie 500, Spacemen 3 and My Bloody Valentine. Two tracks from the album, "She Made Me" and "Evergreen," were released as a double A-side single in 1992. Methodrone was recorded primarily at a studio in the Hunter's Point region of San Francisco called The Compound, where Naut Humon provided an environment for Newcombe to record for hours on end. The band released Spacegirl and Other Favorites later in 1995, with a limited pressing of 500 vinyl copies.

Over the next couple of years, the band shifted its sound from their more shoegaze, goth, and dream pop influences of the '80s and '90s into a '60s retrofuturist aesthetic. As lineup changes persisted, the band continued to record and in 1996 released three full-length studio albums. The first of these, Take It from the Man!, is rooted heavily in the maximum rhythm and blues aesthetic of the 1960s British Invasion. The album includes the song "Straight Up and Down," which was later used as theme music for the HBO television drama series Boardwalk Empire (2010–14), and was engineered by Larry Thrasher of the influential group Psychic TV.

The second of the band's 1996 album releases, Their Satanic Majesties' Second Request, reflects a pastiche of 1960s psychedelia. The album also includes vast experimentation with a variety of different instrumentation including Indian drones, sitars, Mellotrons, farfisas, didgeridoos, tablas, congas, and glockenspiels. The title of the album is a play on words of The Rolling Stones' 1967 album Their Satanic Majesties Request.

The third and final album released that year was Thank God for Mental Illness, a more stripped-down effort. Since the band did not have a drummer at the time, Newcombe took the opportunity to showcase more of his acoustic songwriting. The album explores more in-depth genres such as country and folk. At the end of the album Newcombe included an entire EP called Sound of Confusion, compiled largely from earlier BJM recordings. Sound of Confusion features both regular songs and more abstract sound collages.

=== 1997–1998: Give It Back!, signing to TVT and Strung Out in Heaven ===
The Brian Jonestown Massacre recorded their sixth album, Give It Back!, in 1997 after relocating to Los Angeles, California from San Francisco. The album was tracked in a few short days leading up to the band's first US tour and includes the track, "Not If You Were the Last Dandy on Earth", a sardonic reply to The Dandy Warhols' single "Not If You Were the Last Junkie on Earth", which had been perceived at the time as being directed at the BJM. "Not If You Were the Last Dandy on Earth" was featured on the soundtrack to Jim Jarmusch's 2005 film Broken Flowers. During this time, the BJM signed with TVT Records. This led to the release of the band's seventh full-length album, Strung Out in Heaven, in 1998, as well as their first-ever tours of the UK and Japan. Strung Out in Heaven did not sell as many records as TVT had hoped, and the relationship between the label and the band deteriorated. TVT eventually dissolved its remaining contractual obligations with the band.

=== 1999–2005: Bring It All Back Home – Again, Bravery Repetition and Noise, And This Is Our Music, Dig! and We Are the Radio ===
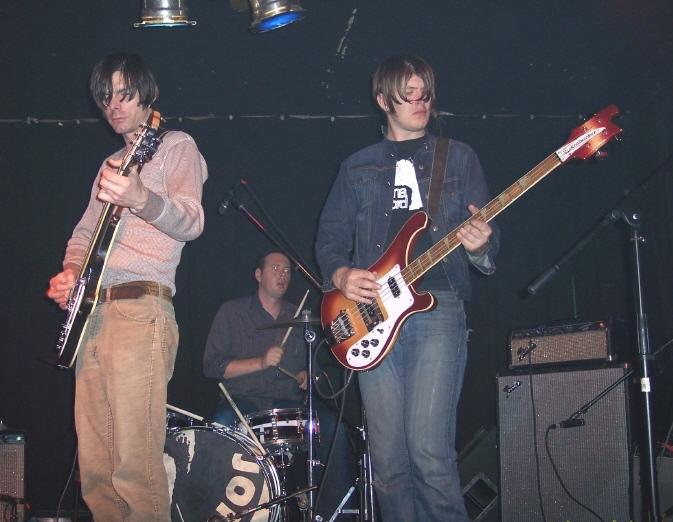
The band in 2004

In 1999, Which? Records released the EP, Bringing It All Back Home – Again, a collection of songs largely written and recorded around the time the band were working on Give It Back! and Strung Out in Heaven. In 2001, the band released their eighth studio album, Bravery, Repetition and Noise, which included the track "Sailor", a re-work of a song originally performed by The Cryan' Shames.

In 2003, the band released their ninth studio album, And This Is Our Music. And This Is Our Music was a step in a new direction for Newcombe and the group creatively, and emphasized more of the electronic music Newcombe had explored in the beginning days of the group. The album's title has been called a reference to the identically titled, but distinct, albums This Is Our Music by the artists Galaxie 500 and Ornette Coleman.

In 2004, the documentary Dig! was released about the group. Though acclaimed by critics, the band heavily criticized the film, believing it to misrepresent Newcombe and the band as a whole.

In 2005, the band released the EP We Are the Radio on Newcombe's own label, The Committee to Keep Music Evil, which features a close collaboration with independent singer-songwriter Sarabeth Tucek. This was the last BJM record to be recorded in the United States, as shortly after this Newcombe relocated to Europe.

=== 2008–2018: experimental music ===
The Brian Jonestown Massacre released their tenth studio album, My Bloody Underground, in 2008 on A Records. The album is directly inspired by the music made by bands My Bloody Valentine and The Velvet Underground. The record contains a highly experimental approach, and was recorded in collaboration with Mark Gardener, formerly of Ride, who co-wrote the song "Monkey Powder". The Brian Jonestown Massacre recorded both of their next releases in Iceland and Berlin.

An EP entitled One was released in November 2009 and featured the tracks "One", "This Is the First of Your Last Warning" (which also appears on their next album, Who Killed Sgt. Pepper?), an English version of "This Is The First of Your Last Warning", and then exclusive track, "Bruttermania".

Who Killed Sgt. Pepper?, the band's eleventh studio album, was released on February 23, 2010. It featured musicians Unnur Andrea Einarsdottir (who recorded vocals on My Bloody Underground), Felix Bondareff from the Russian band Amazing Electronic Talking Cave, as well as the musician Will Carruthers. Soon after the album's release, it was confirmed that Matt Hollywood had returned to the band after an eleven-year absence. According to Newcombe, he would feature on the band's next album and also toured with the band.

The Brian Jonestown Massacre released the album Aufheben on May 1, 2012. Newcombe stated that the album's title relates to Georg Wilhelm Friedrich Hegel's use of the term, whereby something is destroyed in order to preserve it.

Revelation, the band's thirteenth studio album, was released on May 19, 2014. It is the first album to be fully recorded and produced at Newcombe's recording studio in Berlin. Stylistically, the album mixes the traditional Brian Jonestown Massacre sound with Eastern influences.

Their next album, Musique de Film Imaginé, was released on April 27, 2015. The album was conceived as a soundtrack for an imaginary French film, and pays homage to European film directors of the late 1950s and 1960s such as François Truffaut and Jean-Luc Godard. It was recorded in Berlin in August 2014. This was followed in November 2015 by the EP Mini Album Thingy Wingy.

On October 28, 2016, the band released the album Third World Pyramid, which was preceded by the single "The Sun Ship". A few months later, on February 24, 2017, Don't Get Lost, was released having been preceded by seven singles.

On June 1, 2018, their 17th studio album, Something Else, was released.

=== 2019–present: recent activity ===
On March 15, 2019, the band released a self-titled album.

In March 2022, the band announced that two albums, Fire Doesn't Grow on Trees and The Future Is Your Past, were scheduled to be released in June and October 2022 respectively. The former was released on June 24, the latter had a delayed release and instead came out on February 10, 2023.

The band features on Danish duo The Raveonettes' 2023 covers compilation titled, The Raveonettes Presents: Rip It Off, where the BJM covered "Do You Believe Her" from The Raveonettes' 2002 EP Whip it On.

The band spent the majority of 2023 on tour around the world. On November 21, 2023, in the middle of their show at the Forum Theatre in Melbourne, Australia, an onstage brawl was sparked between Newcombe and guitarist Ryan Van Kriedt in which Newcombe hit Van Kriedt over the head with a guitar. The remainder of their Australian tour was canceled the next day. Newcombe did not comment on the incident until a November 2024 interview in which he explained:

Somebody threw a glass at me. I’m pretty good at dodging that stuff, but then the other guy in the group at the time —he’s no longer in the group — threw another bottle or glass back into the audience... I was trying to get security, the promoters, tour managers, anybody just to get this guy off the stage, and nobody paid attention. Ultimately, what happens is the buck stops with me. Some people think, ‘None of this stuff would happen if you just quit playing music.’ I get blamed for everything.

In February 2024, Joel Gion published In the Jingle Jangle Jungle, a memoir recounting the first ten years of the band's history from his perspective.

The band spent February 2025 on tour in the United Kingdom and Ireland. They later spent May of the same year on tour in France.

On April 25, 2025, the band released a double single "Makes Me Great / Out Of Body".

== Name origin ==
The band name is a portmanteau of deceased Rolling Stones founder and guitarist Brian Jones – a key figure in introducing Eastern influences into Western rock in the late Sixties – and the 1978 incident at cult leader Jim Jones' self-dubbed "Jonestown" settlement in Guyana where over 900 of his followers died in a mass murder-suicide known as the Jonestown Massacre.

== Musical style and influence ==
The Brian Jonestown Massacre has been characterized as psychedelic rock, garage rock, neo-psychedelia, and folk rock. Early on, the band exhibited shoegaze influences, resembling prominent bands in the genre such as Galaxie 500 and My Bloody Valentine on their first two albums, Methodrone and Spacegirl and Other Favorites. The band would eventually shift towards psychedelic rock and garage rock on Take It from the Man!, fully embracing neo-psychedelia upon the release of Their Satanic Majesties' Second Request.

The band has been cited as an influence by Leon James Kenny of Black Sonic Revolver, saying "we always listen to BJM before recording or demoing, their creativity inspires us. I remember the bench I was sat on when I first heard BJM album Take It From The Man! – I bought it in Piccadilly Records in Manchester, only because it had the most songs on it. A friend said I'd love them, so took a punt. I had a "discman" on me that day, so I sat on a bench in Castlefield on a lovely day and pressed play. I'll never forget that first encounter", while in 2011, Kristin Warnken of The Glossines included the album in a list of five albums "in her music player". Rishi Dhir of Canadian indie rock band Elephant Stone included "Who?" in his list of "The Best of the Brian Jonestown Massacre".

== Documentary ==
Along with Portland, Oregon alternative rock band The Dandy Warhols, The Brian Jonestown Massacre were the subjects of the 2004 documentary film Dig!. The film captured a love–hate relationship between both bands, highlighting the interaction of Newcombe with his counterpart in the Warhols, Courtney Taylor-Taylor. The film was recorded over the course of seven years by filmmaker Ondi Timoner, but largely focused on The Brian Jonestown Massacre from late 1996 to mid-1998. Dig! won the Documentary Grand Jury Prize at the 2004 Sundance Film Festival.

In January 2024, Dig! XX premiered at the 2024 Sundance Film Festival to celebrate the 20th anniversary of the documentary. This version of the documentary featured both 40 minutes of additional footage as well as new narration by Joel Gion.

== Members ==
The lineup of the band is subject to frequent changes. As of September 2025, the current lineup are as follows:

- Anton Newcombe – lead vocals, guitar (1990–present)
- Ricky Maymi – guitar (1992, 2003–present), drums (1990–1991), bass (1992–1993)
- Joel Gion – tambourine (1994–1999, 2001, 2004–present)
- Hákon Aðalsteinsson – guitar (2018–present)
- Hallberg Daði Hallbergsson – bass (2018, 2023–present)
- Emil Nikolaisen – keyboards, guitars, vocals, flute, taishogoto (2023–present)
- Tobias Humble – drums (2025–present)

== Discography ==
Studio albums

- Methodrone (1995)
- Spacegirl and Other Favorites (1995)
- Take It from the Man! (1996)
- Their Satanic Majesties' Second Request (1996)
- Thank God for Mental Illness (1996)
- Give It Back! (1997)
- Strung Out in Heaven (1998)
- Bravery, Repetition and Noise (2001)
- And This Is Our Music (2003)
- My Bloody Underground (2008)
- Who Killed Sgt. Pepper? (2010)
- Aufheben (2012)
- Revelation (2014)
- Musique de Film Imaginé (2015)
- Third World Pyramid (2016)
- Don't Get Lost (2017)
- Something Else (2018)
- The Brian Jonestown Massacre (2019)
- Fire Doesn't Grow on Trees (2022)
- The Future Is Your Past (2023)
