= Anton Newcombe =

American musician

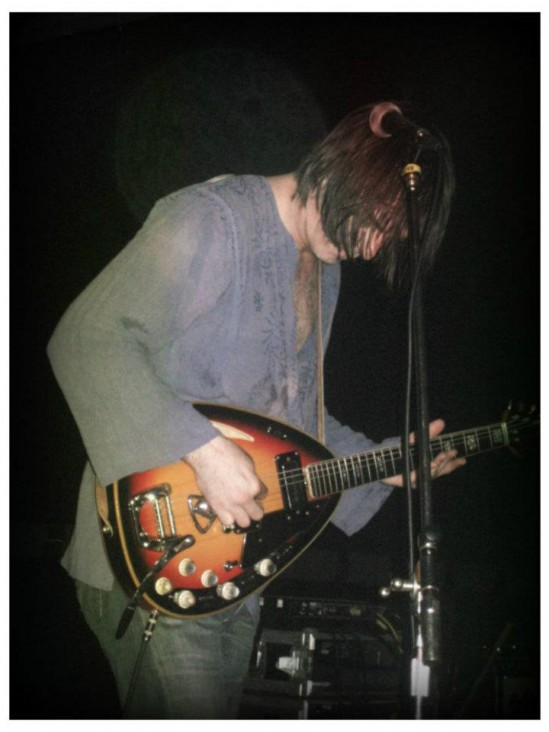
- Newcombe performing in 2012

Background information
- Born: Anton Alfred Newcombe; August 29, 1967 (age 59)
- Origin: Newport Beach, California, U.S.
- Genres: Psychedelic rock, experimental, anti-folk, shoegaze, folk
- Instruments: Vocals; guitar; bass guitar; double bass; sitar; tambura; keyboards; piano; accordion; drums; cello; koto; shamisen; mandolin; lute; hurdy-gurdy; bagpipes; harmonica; flute
- Years active: 1990–present
- Labels: Bomp! Records, TVT Records, Tee Pee Records, A Records, 12 Tónar

Anton Alfred Newcombe (born August 29, 1967) is an American singer, songwriter, multi-instrumentalist, and producer who is the founder and lead musician of the rock band The Brian Jonestown Massacre.

Newcombe was the subject of the 2004 documentary film Dig!, along with Portland, Oregon alternative rock band The Dandy Warhols.

== Early life ==
Newcombe was raised on the working-class west side of Costa Mesa, California, and mostly lived in his mother's garage. He was known to his family and friends as "Tony", and adopted the moniker "Anton" after moving to San Francisco. He recounts that his mother, who was largely homebound, "disconnected from [him] emotionally" when he was a child. His alcoholic father left the household when Newcombe was a toddler. In middle and high school, Newcombe, a punk, was bullied by his classmates. As he was largely unsupervised by his mother, he engaged in delinquent behavior, such as theft, hard drug use, and partying.

Newcombe began playing the piano at a young age, and began performing in local punk groups in his early teen years. His first lead role was in a band called Chronic Disorder. After it broke up, he founded Electric Cool Aide with some of his friends. He dropped out of high school to play in the band, which soon began playing at clubs in Huntington Beach. The band broke up as a result of Newcombe's adversarial behavior, and Newcombe formed the short-lived band Homeland before moving to San Francisco at 17 in order to pursue his interest in psychedelic rock. He soon began recruiting for his new band, which he wanted to call Blur, but soon became The Brian Jonestown Massacre.

== Career ==
Besides The Brian Jonestown Massacre, Newcombe has worked with several bands, most notably The Dandy Warhols, The High Dials, The Manvils, Innaway, and The Quarter After. He recorded and produced Dead Meadow's album Got Live if You Want It, and recorded a cover of Ewan MacColl's song "Dirty Old Town" with Lorraine Leckie on her 2008 album Four Cold Angels.

=== The Brian Jonestown Massacre ===
Newcombe founded the musical group The Brian Jonestown Massacre in San Francisco, in 1990. Core members in the early years included Matt Hollywood, Jeffrey Davies, Joel Gion, Travis Threlkel, Peter Hayes, Patrick Straczek, Ricky Maymi, Brian Glaze, Elise Dye and Dean Taylor, although the line up was subject to frequent changes. Newcombe wrote most of the group's songs, with Hollywood collaborating or contributing others on occasion. Following Hollywood's departure from the group in 1998, Newcombe's name became almost synonymous with The Brian Jonestown Massacre. Newcombe was also heavily involved in the post-production of his albums, often engineering and mixing them on his own. A prolific artist, he authored over 150 songs in a 15-year period.

In 2016, he composed the soundtrack for British indie film Moon Dogs, directed by Philip John.

During the 2022–23 European Tour with The Brian Jonestown Massacre, Newcombe gave away free tickets to each of his shows in raffles that raised money for Oxfam.

=== Tess Parks & Anton Newcombe ===
Newcombe recorded two albums with Toronto singer-songwriter Tess Parks: I Declare Nothing in 2015, and the eponymous Tess Parks & Anton Newcombe in 2018.

=== L'Épée ===
In 2019, Newcombe founded the musical group L'Épée along with French film star Emmanuelle Seigner and The Limiñanas.

== A Recordings Ltd ==
Newcombe performing in 2018

Newcombe founded the record label A Recordings Ltd., where he releases records for The Brian Jonestown Massacre and other artists including Dead Meadow and the Vacant Lots.

== Behavior and personal life ==
Newcombe's volatile behavior is well-documented and has significantly impacted his life and career. James Balmont writes that "[The Brian Jonestown Massacre's] attempts to break into the mainstream had been repeatedly thwarted – usually through self-sabotage by their frontman Anton Newcombe." He has been accused of physically abusing his bandmates from his earliest projects in Costa Mesa. Newcombe has gotten in fistfights with other musicians in The Brian Jonestown Massacre on several occasions, perhaps most infamously at the Viper Room in 1996, when Newcombe brawled with his bandmates onstage during an industry showcase, probably denying the band a major label deal. More recently, Newcombe fought with bandmates at a show in Melbourne in 2023. Newcombe has also been accused of violent and abusive conduct toward audience members. Newcombe's life and behavior have been impacted by drug addiction, alcoholism and depression. He became addicted to heroin after his father's suicide (on Newcombe's birthday) in 1997, which almost lead to the band's breakup.

Part of Newcombe's life is featured prominently in the documentary film Dig! which focuses on the tense relationship between The Brian Jonestown Massacre and The Dandy Warhols as both bands struggle for success. Newcombe disliked Dig!. which he claimed misrepresented his band's dynamic.

Newcombe and his wife, Katy, have a son, Wolfgang Gotthardt Newcombe, who was born in 2003. He moved full-time to Berlin in 2006, where he still lived as of 2026. He does not speak German fluently. He describes himself as "kind of conservative by nature", but is a critic of Donald Trump.
