= Way Out West discography =

- Studio albums: 5
- EPs: 2
- Compilation albums: 2
- Singles: 25
- Music videos: 4

The following is a comprehensive discography of Way Out West, an English electronic music duo. Their discography comprises five studio albums, two compilation albums, two EPs, twenty five singles and other releases.

== Albums ==
=== Studio albums ===
| Title | Album details | Peak chart positions | |
| Title | Album details | UK | UK Dance |
|---|---|---|---|
| Way Out West | Released: 1 September 1997; Label: Deconstruction Records; Formats: CD, CS, digital download, vinyl | 42 | — |
| Intensify | Released: 20 August 2001; Label: Distinct'ive Records; Formats: CD, digital download, vinyl | 61 | — |
| Don't Look Now | Released: 5 October 2004; Label: Distinct'ive Records; Formats: CD, digital download, vinyl | 137 | — |
| We Love Machine | Released: 20 September 2009; Label: Hope Recordings; Formats: CD, digital download | — | — |
| Tuesday Maybe | Released: 16 June 2017; Label: Anjunadeep; Formats: CD, digital download, vinyl | — | 7 |
"—" denotes a recording that did not chart or was not released in that territory.

=== Compilation albums ===
| Title | Album details |
|---|---|
| We Love Machine – The Remixes | Released: 19 April 2010; Label: Hope Recordings; Formats: CD, digital download, vinyl |
| Tuesday Maybe (Remixed) | Released: 2 February 2018; Label: Anjunadeep; Formats: Digital download |

== Extended plays ==
| Title | Album details | Charts |
| Title | Album details | UK |
|---|---|---|
| UB Devoid | Released: 9 October 2000; Label: Deconstruction Records; Formats: CD, digital download, vinyl | 146 |
| Sunday Maybe | Released: 20 April 2018; Label: Anjunadeep; Formats: Digital download | — |
"—" denotes a recording that did not chart or was not released in that territory.

== Singles ==
| Title | Year | Peak chart positions | | | | Album |
| Title | Year | UK | UK Dance | NED | US Dance | Album |
|---|---|---|---|---|---|---|
| "The Jug" (as Echo) | 1992 | — | — | — | — | Non-album singles |
| "Avalanche" (as Echo) | 1993 | — | — | — | — | Non-album singles |
| "Paradise (Is the Sound)" (as Sub-Version 3) | 1993 | — | — | — | — | Non-album singles |
| "Montana" | 1994 | — | — | — | — | Non-album singles |
| "Shoot" | 1994 | — | — | — | — | Non-album singles |
| "Ajare" (Original release) | 1994 | 52 | 7 | — | — | Way Out West |
| "Domination" | 1996 | 38 | 2 | — | — | Way Out West |
| "The Gift" (featuring Joanna Law) | 1996 | 15 | 2 | — | 39 | Way Out West |
| "Blue" | 1997 | 41 | 7 | — | — | Way Out West |
| "Ajare" (1997 re-release) | 1997 | 36 | 3 | — | — | Way Out West |
| "The Fall" | 2000 | 61 | 36 | 41 | — | Intensify |
| "Intensify" | 2001 | 46 | 12 | — | — | Intensify |
| "Mindcircus" (featuring Tricia Lee Kelshall) | 2002 | 39 | 1 | — | 15 | Intensify |
| "Stealth" (featuring Kirsty Hawkshaw) | 2002 | 67 | 3 | — | — | Intensify |
| "Muthaf**ka" | 2003 | 83 | 8 | — | — | Non-album single |
| "Anything but You" | 2004 | 97 | 25 | — | — | Don't Look Now |
| "Don't Forget Me" | 2005 | 246 | — | — | — | Don't Look Now |
| "Killa" | 2005 | — | — | — | — | Don't Look Now |
| "Spaceman" | 2008 | — | — | — | — | Non-album single |
| "Only Love" | 2009 | — | — | — | — | We Love Machine |
| "Future Perfect" | 2009 | — | — | — | — | We Love Machine |
| "Surrender" | 2010 | — | — | — | — | We Love Machine |
| "The Gift" (2010 re-release) | 2010 | — | — | — | — | We Love Machine – The Remixes |
| "Tuesday Maybe" | 2016 | — | — | — | — | Tuesday Maybe |
| "Set My Mind" | 2016 | — | — | — | — | Tuesday Maybe |
| "Oceans" (featuring Liu Bei) | 2017 | — | — | — | — | Tuesday Maybe |
| "The Call" (featuring Doe Paoro) | 2017 | — | — | — | — | Tuesday Maybe |
| "Slam" | 2017 | — | — | — | — | Tuesday Maybe |
| "Sunday Maybe" | 2018 | — | — | — | — | Sunday Maybe |
"—" denotes a recording that did not chart or was not released in that territory.

== Remixes ==
- 1992: Echo – "The Jug"
- 1993: Sub-Version 3 – "Paradise (Is the Sound)"
- 1993: Eight – "I Believe in Emotion"
- 1993: Echo – "Avalanche"
- 1993: A Certain Ratio – "Tekno"
- 1994: Anthony White – "Love Me Tonight"
- 1994: Royal 'T' – "Coming Back for More"
- 1994: Sasha – "Magic"
- 1994: Marcella Detroit – "I Feel Free"
- 1994: Flybaby – "Fiesta"
- 1994: A Certain Ratio – "Wild Party"
- 1994: Respect featuring Hannah Jones – "Young Hearts Run Free"
- 1994: Subliminal Cuts – "Le Voie Le Soleil"
- 1995: Reel 2 Real featuring The Mad Stuntman – "Conway"
- 1995: Liquid – "Sweet Harmony"
- 1995: Bel Canto – "We've Got to Work It Out"
- 1995: Dubstar – "Not So Manic Now"
- 1995: Dubstar – "Stars"
- 1995: José Padilla – "Sabor De Verano"
- 1995: Kamasutra – "Censored"
- 1995: Movin' Melodies Production – "La Luna"
- 1995: John Digweed – "Love Me Tonight"
- 1996: Faithless – "Salva Mea"
- 1996: 108 Grand – "Tonight"
- 1996: Castle Trancelott – "Indoctrinate"
- 1996: Lucky Monkeys – "Bjango"
- 1996: Saint Etienne – "Angel"
- 1996: Last Rhythm – "Last Rhythm"
- 1996: Harmonix – "Landslide"
- 1996: The Tabernacle – "I Know the Lord"
- 1996: X-Press 2 – "Tranz Euro Xpress"
- 1996: Way Out West – "Domination"
- 1996: Freak Power – "New Direction"
- 1996: JX – "There's Nothing I Won't Do"
- 1996: Roni Size / Reprazent – "Share the Fall"
- 1997: Clanger – "Seadog"
- 1997: Marco Zaffarano – "The Band"
- 1997: Republica – "Bitch"
- 1997: Way Out West – Ajare
- 1997: B.B.E. – "Desire"
- 1997: Section X – "Atlantis"
- 1997: The Orb – "Toxygene"
- 1998: Paul van Dyk – "For an Angel"
- 1998: Jonathan Peters Presents Luminaire – "Flower Duet"
- 1998: Karen Ramirez – "Troubled Girl"
- 1998: Liquid Child – "Diving Faces"
- 1998: Natalie Imbruglia – "Smoke"
- 1998: Opus III – "Fine Day"
- 1999: Lost Witness – "Happiness Happening"
- 1999: Orbital – "Nothing Left"
- 1999: Hybrid – "If I Survive"
- 1999: Lightning Seeds – "Life's Too Short"
- 1999: Inner City – "Good Life"
- 1999: Lustral – "Everytime"
- 1999: Joi – "Asian Vibes"
- 1999: Caspar Pound – "Pioneers of the Warped Groove"
- 2000: James Holden – "Horizons"
- 2000: Kosheen – "Catch"
- 2000: Futura Sound – "Call My Name"
- 2000: Submarine – "Sunbeam"
- 2000: Ultra Violet – "Heaven"
- 2000: Antarctica – "Return to Reality"
- 2000: Freefall featuring Jan Johnston – "Skydive"
- 2000: DFM – "Lovin' U"
- 2001: BT – "Shame"
- 2001: Tiësto – "Suburban Train"
- 2001: Tarrentella – "Karma"
- 2001: Joshua Ryan – "Pistolwhip"
- 2001: Way Out West – "Intensify"
- 2001: Vertigo – "Above It All"
- 2002: Way Out West – "Mindcircus"
- 2002: Ding Fei Fei – "Forgotten Moon"
- 2002: Sunscreem – "Perfect Motion"
- 2002: Lustral – "Broken"
- 2002: Way Out West – "Stealth"
- 2003: Dusk – "Stars"
- 2003: Sattva – "Echo of Silence"
- 2004: Unkle & Ian Brown – "Reign"
- 2005: Camp & Leutwyler Present BCML – "Mr Horowitz"
- 2005: Way Out West – "Don't Forget Me"
- 2007: General Midi – "Never Gonna Stop the Show"
- 2009: Sudha featuring Zoë Johnston – "Leche"
- 2010: Way Out West – "The Gift"
- 2016: Charlotte OC – "Darkest Hour"

== Music videos ==
| Year | Song | Director | Album |
|---|---|---|---|
| 1996 | "The Gift" (featuring Joanna Law) | None | Way Out West |
| 1997 | "Blue" | None | Way Out West |
| 2002 | "Mindcircus" (featuring Tricia Lee Kelshall) | None | Intensify |
| 2009 | "Only Love" (Digital exclusive single) | None | We Love Machine |
