= List of UK Dance Singles Chart number ones of 2002 =

These are The Official UK Charts Company UK Official Dance Chart number one hits of 2002. The dates listed in the menus below represent the Saturday after the Sunday the chart was announced, as per the way the dates are given in chart publications such as the ones produced by Billboard, Guinness, and Virgin.

Issue date	Song	Artist
5 January ^{[a]}	"Gotta Get Thru This"	Daniel Bedingfield
12 January	"Body Rock"	Shimon & Andy C
19 January	"Drifting Away"	Lange featuring Skye
26 January	"Star Guitar"	The Chemical Brothers
2 February	"The Drill"	Dirt Devils
9 February	"Sleep Talk"	ATFC featuring Lisa Millett
16 February	"So Lonely"	Jakatta
23 February	"To Get Down"	Timo Maas
2 March	"Thrill Me"	Junior Jack
9 March	"Something"	Lasgo
16 March	"Its Gonna Be (A Lovely Day)"	Brancaccio & Aisher
23 March	"On the Run"	Tillmann Uhrmacher
30 March	"Mindcircus"	Way Out West featuring Tricia Lee Hall
6 April	"Shake Ur Body"	Shy FX & T-Power featuring Di
13 April	"Lethal Industry"	DJ Tiësto
20 April	"Lazy"	X-Press 2 featuring David Byrne
27 April	"Lazy"	X-Press 2 featuring David Byrne
4 May	"Come With Us/The Test"	The Chemical Brothers
11 May	"At Night"	Shakedown
18 May	"At Night"	Shakedown
25 May	"La La Land"	Green Velvet
1 June	"You Can't Go Home Again"	DJ Shadow
8 June	"Punk"	Ferry Corsten
15 June	"Madagascar"	Art of Trance
22 June	"Love Story"	Layo & Bushwacka!
29 June	"Get Me Off"	Basement Jaxx
6 July	"Mother"	M Factor
13 July	"Reckless Girl"	Beginerz
20 July	"It Just Won't Do"	Tim Deluxe featuring Sam Obernik
27 July	"It Just Won't Do"	Tim Deluxe featuring Sam Obernik
3 August	"It Just Won't Do"	Tim Deluxe featuring Sam Obernik
10 August	"Safe From Harm"	Narcotic Thrust
17 August	"Fascinated"	Raven Maize
24 August	"DJ Nation"	Nukleuz DJs
31 August	"Just The Way You Are"	Milky
7 September	"Rippin Kittin"	Golden Boy with Miss Kittin
14 September	"Two Months Off"	Underworld
21 September	"Two Months Off"	Underworld
28 September	"Fly With Me"	Coloursound
5 October	"Take Me with You"	Cosmos
12 October	"Days Go By"	Dirty Vegas
19 October	"Pressure Cooker"	G Club presents Banda Sonara
26 October	"Shined On Me"	Praise Cats
2 November	"Shiny Disco Balls"	Who Da Funk featuring Jessica Eve
9 November	"Shiny Disco Balls"	Who Da Funk featuring Jessica Eve
16 November	"LK (Carolina Carol Bela)"	D.Kay, Marky & XRS featuring Stamina MC
23 November	"Diamond Life"	Little Louie Vega and Jay "Sinister" Sealee starring Julie McKnight
30 November	"Obsession"	Tiësto featuring Junkie XL
7 December	"Revolution"	BK
14 December	"Revolution"	BK
21 December	"Live Or Die / South Manz"	Dillinja
28 December	"Wolf"	Shy FX

== Notes ==
- ^{a} – the single was simultaneously number-one on the singles chart.

== See also ==
- 2002 in music
