= Thank God for Mental Illness =

Studio album by the Brian Jonestown Massacre
- Released: October 25, 1996
- Recorded: July 11, 1996
- Studio: Our House (San Francisco)
- Genre: Psychedelic folk; country rock; country blues; lo-fi; folk rock
- Length: 63:43
- Label: Bomp!
- Producer: Anton Newcombe

The Brian Jonestown Massacre chronology
Their Satanic Majesties' Second Request (1996)	Thank God for Mental Illness (1996)	Give It Back! (1997)

Thank God for Mental Illness is the fifth album by the American psychedelic rock band the Brian Jonestown Massacre. After releasing Take It from the Man! and Their Satanic Majesties' Second Request in mid-1996, both of which display influences from 1960s psychedelic music, departing from the band's earlier shoegaze sound, the band recorded Thank God for Mental Illness through "tangible custom lo-fi stereo" in their San Francisco home studio on July 11, 1996, with the budget of $17.36.

The album shows another musical palette for the group, taking influence from country blues and psychedelic folk music, with one review calling it "an incredibly strange acoustic venture." The album is divided into two parts; the first part features mostly acoustic lo-fi songs of a short length, whilst the other half is a series of songs and pieces merged into one track named "Sound of Confusion", that features both regular songs and more abstract sound collages.

Released on October 25, 1996, by record label Bomp!, it was the third and final full-length album released by the band in that year. The album title was lead singer Anton Newcombe's personal jab at insults directed towards him. The album was critically acclaimed and was hailed for, among numerous points, its lo-fi quality and influences. Several critics drew out comparisons to Bob Dylan. The album has since been hailed as one of the band's greatest, and Newcombe's own record label A Records re-released the album on CD in 2007 and on LP in 2016, the latter marking the first time it was issued on LP.

== Background and recording ==
After spending 1995 signing to Bomp! Records and releasing their debut album Methodrone, which featured a shoegazing-influenced style, and re-releasing Spacegirl and Other Favorites, a collection of the band's earliest recordings from 1993, the group changed their direction considerably, and under the influence of 1960s British rock and psychedelic music, recorded Take It from the Man! and Their Satanic Majesties' Second Request respectively from 1995 to 1996, both of which were then released in mid-1996. Becoming their most prolific year for releases, the group decided to record a third album for release in 1996, again showing a different influence, namely from folk music, although again presenting it in a psychedelic style.

Self-produced by band leader Anton Newcombe, the entire album was recorded on July 11, 1996 "live" in the band's home studio in San Francisco, California; the studio is referred to in the liner notes as "Our House." The album only cost $17.36 to record, a sum that Newcombe paid for entirely. The liner notes state the album was recorded in "tangible lo-fi custom stereo" in order to "keep the faith." The very small budget has entered legendary status, with Tiny Mix Tapes recalling of the recording sessions:

"According to Dig!, most of the band's recorded work from this period was done as follows: a bright-eyed and bushy-tailed rep from an upstart record company would hear the band, feel very enthusiastic about the sound, and (against better judgement) would pull some strings and get the band a week or so of studio time. During that week, the group would virtually camp out in the studio and in that short amount of time, somehow manage to record an entire album. This album was that formula on steroids: legend has it that this entire album was recorded in one day, for under $20. Perhaps this factor contributed to what turned out to be one of the band's greatest strengths; that is, their ability to simply create the music, without ever taking a self-conscious pause to question whether more bells and whistles here or there would make the album more appealing. This album came during the middle of a time when the band put out six albums in four short years. The antithesis of Sean Lennon's recording style, so to speak, but for this group, any other way just wouldn't seem right."

== Music and lyrics ==
Marking another direction for the band, Thank God for Mental Illness has been described as an acoustic-based, psychedelic lo-fi album taking strong influences from country, blues, and folk. Jason Ankeny of AllMusic described the album as "the BJM's down-and-dirty country-blues outing", whilst the Phoenix New Times called it a "blusey, acoustic folk album," and SF Weekly described it as an "incredibly strange acoustic venture." Wondering Sound agreed the album was "country-tinged" and said it allowed the band to pioneer "a malevolent and incendiary take on psychedelic rock, one that located a sinister undercurrent in the hippy dream and coaxed it to the surface." Under the Radar described the album as "Dylan-esque," whilst Pitchfork Media more specifically described Newcombe's performance on the album as "busker-Dylan esque." In his interview with Newcombe, Ben Vendetta from Vendetta Mag observed a folk rock influence on the album, noting that he does "go off in different directions" on his records; Newcome agreed although adding "but its all psychedelic, you know what I mean? Its all being psychedelic." Debaser detected another influence in "the roots of the Californian rock of the sixties," noting the possible influence of Skip Spence, Quicksilver Messenger Service and acid rock. Newcombe's singing is often plaintive through the album, with "mawkish synthetic texts."

"Mental Illness shows a portrait of a band in the midst of their creative peak (which arguably spanned several albums), at a time when the songs just seemed to create themselves."

— Tiny Mix Tapes

The album is divided into two parts; the first part features mostly acoustic lo-fi songs of a short length, described by one reviewer as "loose bohemian tunes," whilst the other half is a series of songs and pieces merged into one track named "Sound of Confusion", that features both regular songs and more abstract sound collages. The first seven minutes is the sound of passing cars, described by one reviewer as "motorway sound effects," and an incoherent religious chant performed by Newcombe, followed in other places by "electrical delirium". Debaser said that "Sound of Confusion" is to the band what "Sister Ray" is to the Velvet Underground, saying the comparison is "certainly not unreasonable." Opening song "Spanish Bee" was described by Tiny Mix Tapes as "a playfully dramatic number that eases nicely into the rest of the album." "It Girl" features a "stylish Spaghetti Western vibe." "13" was described by Tiny Mix Tapes as "one of the funniest tracks." In the words of one reviewer, "Stars" exemplifies how Newcombe's "Dylan-esque lyrics resonate by being both straightforward and poignant," highlighting the lyrics "My face explodes teardrops into tears/And every second I'm not with you/Well it seems like years" as an example.

== Packaging and release ==
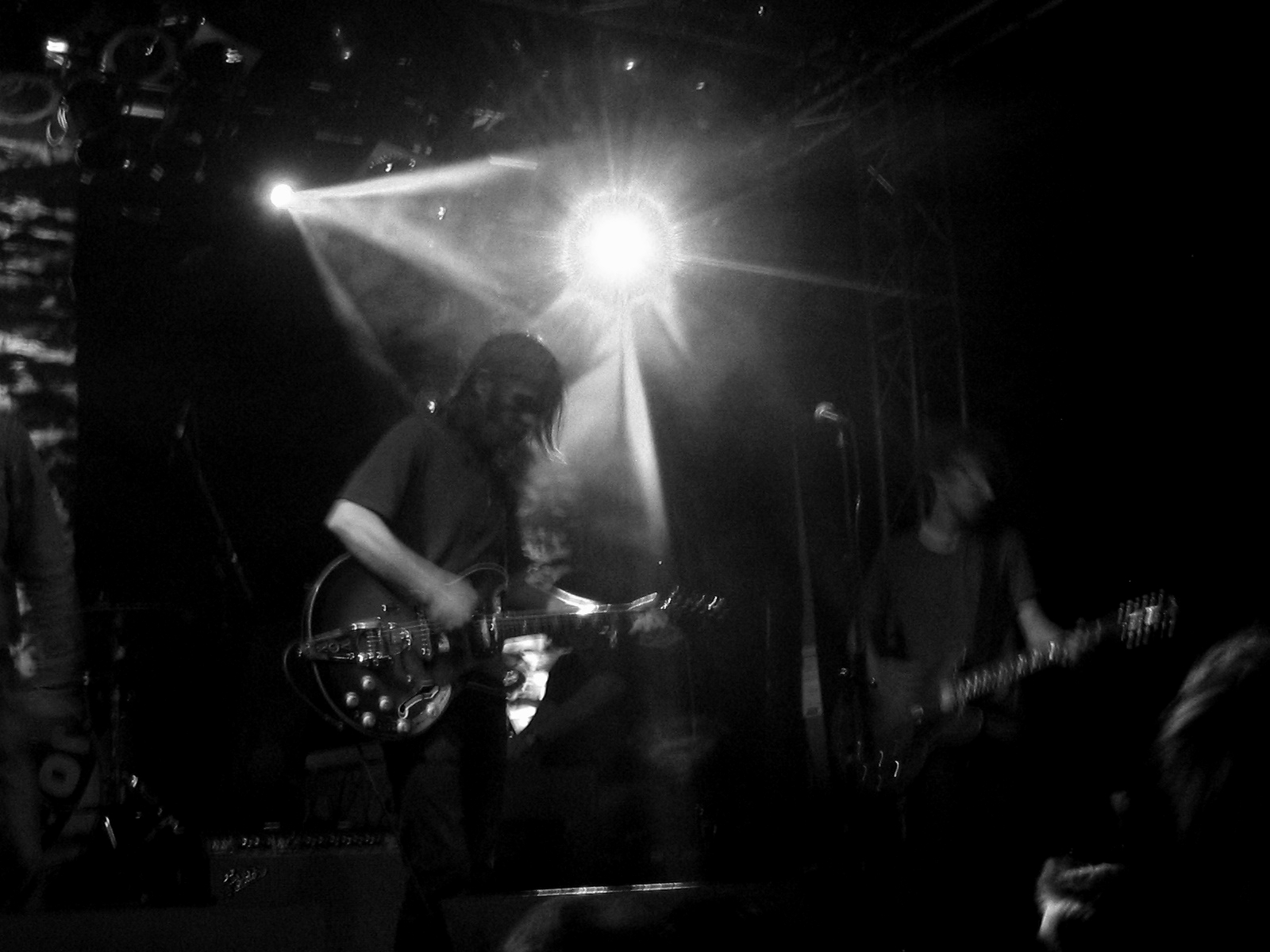
Anton Newcombe's A Records re-released the album in 2007.

A crazed-looking photograph of the band's tambourine player Joel Gion appears on the album cover, perhaps reflecting the album title Thank God for Mental Illness, which was chosen by Newcombe; when asked by The Guardian if he was debunking people's perception of the mentally ill cult rocker with the album title, Newcombe responded "No, it was about me. Because people – my mom, whoever – always said, 'You're insane.' So it was a jab at that whole thing. I was like, 'I'm insane? OK, well thank God for mental illness.' It was a personal statement." A reviewer for Sentimentalist Mag said that, alongside Take it from the Man!, the album title was his favorite because it's a "simple, direct [statement] that immediately [reveals] the provocateur mind of main man/songwriter Anton Newcombe."

Released on October 25, 1996, by Bomp! Records, Thank God for Mental Illness was the third and final album the band released in 1996. It was the only Brian Jonestown Massacre album that Newcombe gave a copy of to his father, who committed suicide less than a year later. Much of Ondi Timoner's rockumentary film about the band Dig!, released in 2004, was filmed in the aftermath of the release of the album; the BBC stated that the album "was their main album at the time of the film." The album was not a commercial success, and was only ever released on CD; many of the band's other albums had been issued on LP. However, on January 18, 2016, an LP edition was released in the UK by Newcombe's own record label A Records. A Records also released a remastered CD edition in the UK in 2007.

== Critical reception ==
Professional ratings
Review scores
Source	Rating
AllMusic	4/5 stars
Tiny Mix Tapes	4.5/5 stars
xsilence	14/20

The album was critically acclaimed. AllMusic's Jason Ankeny wrote that "with Thank God for Mental Illness, their third collection of absolutely stunning music in less than a year, the Brian Jonestown Massacre parallels the prolific and effortless brilliance of the Rolling Stones at their fevered late-1960s peak; the sheer scope of their achievements is stunning – rarely are bands quite so productive, or quite so consistently amazing. [...] while it lacks the blistering immediacy of their previous material, the album swaggers and struts with all of the group's usual attitude intact, coming complete with a loose, offhanded feel perfectly accenting the overall atmosphere of debauchery". SF Weekly called the album "incredibly strange" but still said it was "worthy." Drowned in Sound retrospectively comments that its "ably demonstrates" the band creating "some wonderful music pretty much unparalleled by any of their peers."

Tiny Mix Tapes rated the album four and a half stars out of five, saying "Mental Illness proves once again that the only thing necessary to make a great rock album is that spark: that spontaneous, effortless charm which is impossible to duplicate, no matter how many producers or professional musicians one brings into the studio." xsilence retrospectively rated the album 14 out of 20, saying it was a hard disc to access "but not without interest, that only fans and purists are likely to appreciate its true value. After all, this vintage sound, is not it simply The White Stripes before their time?" They said "the sound is crappy [...] and that's really what gives charm to this disc." Debaser said that "this is not their best album," but "is definitely the disk with which it is worthwhile to know them. It's like a shooting star that cannot burn. And one of the disks that surely if we ever explain why the nineties are not just throwaway we could take as an example."

Today the album is regarded as one of the band's best. Several years after its release, Sara Sherr for the Daily News said it might be the band's best album and described it as sounding "like an even blacker version of the Rolling Stones' Paint It Black." That same year, LA Weekly said the album was "their only consistent album" and "also their most committed to slavering R&B and minor-key Appalachian melancholy." In 2015, Cracked Magazine said the album is "still known as one of the BJM’s best and most interesting albums." FBI Radio described the album as "iconic" and Angel Fire described it as "stunning," whilst Skiddle called the album "classic." Debaser called it "the best and most hidden." The Line of Best Fit said the album showed the band at their best.

== Legacy ==
Musician Jo Rose, when asked by Louder Than War an interview about his goals for the future, made comment at the album, answering "I spent a lot of time trying to get attention from a label, quite directly and I got very down but then I just went back to writing. I bought The Brian Jonestown Massacre – Thank God for Mental Illness – and its like a Q and A, like; ‘Did you try to sell your soul’ and Anton Newcome replied; ‘I tried but the queue was too long’ So I said fuck it! Now I’m just having a nice time"

== Track listing ==
All tracks are written by The Brian Jonestown Massacre, except where noted.

No.	Title	Writer(s)	Length
1.	"Spanish Bee"		3:48
2.	"It Girl"		2:12
3.	"13"		2:35
4.	"Ballad of Jim Jones"		2:14
5.	"Those Memories" (Alan O'Bryant cover)	Alan O'Bryant	2:01
6.	"Stars"		3:15
7.	"Free and Easy, Take 2"		2:28
8.	"Down"		3:52
9.	"Cause I Love Her"		1:14
10.	"Too Crazy to Care"		1:22
11.	"Talk - Action = Shit"		2:07
12.	"True Love"		3:32
13.	"Sound of Confusion": I. "Fire Song"; II. "Fuck You For Fucking Me"; III. "Spun"; IV. "Kid's Garden"; V. "Wasted"		33:03: 11:56; 3:52; 4:20; 7:23; 5:19
Total length:			63:43

== Personnel ==
- Anton Newcombe – guitar, bass, drums, vocals
- Matt Hollywood – bass
- Jeff Davies – guitar
- Dean Taylor – guitar
- Joel Gion – percussion
- Travis Threlkel – guitar
- Ricky Maymi – bass
- Brian Glaze – drums
- Mara Keagle – guitar, percussion
- Greg Helton – drums
