= Women in space (disambiguation) =

Women in space have flown and worked in outer space.

Women in space may also refer to:

- Chinese women in space
- Mercury 13, or the Woman in Space Program, 1959–1962

== See also ==
- List of women astronauts
- Spacewoman (disambiguation)
- Spacegirl (disambiguation)
- Lady Astronaut (disambiguation)
