= Eli & Fur =

English DJ duo

- Origin: London, England
- Genres: House music, deep house
- Occupations: DJ, Producers & Singer / Songwriters
- Years active: 2012–present
- Labels: Defected Records, Anjunadeep, NYX Music
- Members: Eliza Noble Alta Lora; Jennifer Skillman
- Website: www.eliandfur.com

Eli & Fur are a DJ and electronic music producer duo comprising Eliza Noble and Jennifer Skillman, hailing from London, England.

== Biography ==
Eli & Fur met as teenagers while attending sixth form at Hurtwood House. The group has a background in songwriting and while they started out in DJ music, they are moving into live acts using Ableton software. Eli & Fur write and play their own tracks, which creates a sound that is "distinctly electronic, mixing house and dance beats."

The duo’s debut track, "You’re So High" (2013) reached the top 3 on Hype Machine and has since received over 70 million views on YouTube. Their debut EP, Illusions was released by NYX Records on July 22, 2013.

Eli & Fur toured the United States in 2015.

In December 2018, they were featured in a travel advertisement for Kayak, creating music with sounds sourced during a trip to Japan.

== Discography ==
=== Studio albums ===
- Found in the Wild (2021)
- Dreamscapes (2024)

=== Remix albums ===
- Found in the Wild (Remixed) (2021)

=== Extended plays ===
- Illusions (2013)
- California Love (2015)
- Night Blooming Jasmine (2018)
- Into The Night (2019)

=== Singles ===
==== As lead artist ====
- "Sea of Stars" (2012, NYX)
- "Nightmares" (2013, NYX)
- Davidian & Eli & Fur - "Let it Go" (2013, NYX)
- "Feel the Fire" (2014, Anjunadeep)
- "Hold Me Down" (2016, NYX) (Beatport exclusive)
- "On My Own" featuring Forrest (2016, NYX)
- TACHES x Eli & Fur - "Lookalike" (2016, Different)
- "Chlo" / "Wendy Legs" (2017, Anjunadeep)
- «Otherside» (2020, Spinnin' Deep)
- «Walk The Line» / «Big Tiger» (2020, Anjunadeep)
- «Carbon» (2021, Anjunadeep)
- "Burning" (2021), featuring Camden Cox
- «Temptation» (2022, Anjunadeep)
- MEDUZA x Eli & Fur - «Pegasus» (2023, Anjunadeep)
- «Where I Find My Mind» (2023, Anjunadeep)

==== As featured artist ====
- Clancy featuring Eli & Fur - "I Wanna Know" (2014, Anjunadeep)
- Erick Morillo featuring Eli & Fur - "Thunder & Lightning" (2016, Subliminal)

=== Guest appearances ===
- MANIK featuring Eli & Fur - "Far Away" (2014, Anjunadeep) (from Far Away / Mulberry)
- Way Out West featuring Eli & Fur - "Running Away" (2017, Anjunadeep) (from Tuesday Maybe)
- CamelPhat and Eli & Fur - "Waiting" (2020, Sony) (from Dark Matter)

=== Remixes ===
- Apres - "Chicago" (Eli & Fur Remix) (2015, SubSoul)
- Chase & Status And Blossoms - "This Moment" (Eli & Fur Remix) (2017, Virgin)
