= Spaceman =

Spaceman most commonly refers to:

- Astronaut or cosmonaut, a person trained to operate or serve aboard a spacecraft

Spaceman may also refer to:

== Film and television ==
- Spaceman (1997 film), an American science fiction comedy film
- Spaceman (2016 film), an American biographical film
- Spaceman (2024 film), an American science fiction drama
- Space-Men, a 1960 Italian science fiction film
- Leo Spaceman, a character in the TV sitcom 30 Rock
- "Spaceman", an episode of the TV series Servant

== Music ==
- The Spacemen, a 1959 studio band led by Sammy Benskin

=== Albums ===
- Spaceman (Ace Frehley album), 2018
- Spaceman (Nick Jonas album), 2021
- Spaceman (mixtape), by Octavian, 2018
- Spaceman, an EP by Verdena, 2001

=== Songs ===
- "Spaceman" (4 Non Blondes song), 1993
- "Spaceman" (Babylon Zoo song), 1996
- "Spaceman" (Bif Naked song), 1998
- "Mr. Spaceman", by the Byrds, 1966
- "Spaceman" (Hardwell song), 2012
- "Spaceman" (Harry Nilsson song), 1972
- "Spaceman" (The Killers song), 2008
- "Spaceman" (Nick Jonas song), 2021
- "Spaceman", by Dave Matthews Band from Big Whiskey & the GrooGrux King, 2009
- "Spaceman", by Electric Callboy featuring FiNCH from Tekkno, 2022
- "Spaceman", by Journey from Next, 1977
- "Spaceman", by Mumzy Stranger from Journey Begins, 2010
- "Space Man", by Sam Ryder, 2022
- "Space Man", by Smash Mouth from Get the Picture?, 2003
- "Spaceman", a 2008 song by Way Out West
- "The Spaceman", by Hypnogaja from The Kill Switch, 2003

== People with the nickname or stage name ==
- Dominic Dale (born 1971), Welsh professional snooker player and commentator
- Ace Frehley (1951–2025), American musician and member of the band Kiss
- Bill Lee (left-handed pitcher) (born 1946), American baseball pitcher
- Spaceman Patterson (born 1954), American musical artist
- Jason Pierce (born 1965), English musician and member of the band Spacemen 3

== Other uses ==
- Spaceman (comics), a comic book miniseries
- Solway Firth Spaceman, a 1964 photograph

== See also ==
- Man in Space, a Wernher von Braun TV special
- Men in Space, a novel
- Men into Space, TV series
- “D’Yer Wanna Be A Spaceman?”, a song by Oasis from the single Shakermaker
- Seaman (rank)
- Spaceboy (disambiguation)
- Spacewoman (disambiguation)
- Starman (disambiguation)
- Extraterrestrial (disambiguation)
- Alien (disambiguation)
