= Take It from the Man! =

Studio album by The Brian Jonestown Massacre
- Released: May 28, 1996
- Recorded: November 1995 – February 1996
- Studios: Dance Home Studio; Lifesource Studios, Emeryville, California
- Genres: Garage rock; psychedelic rock
- Length: 69:13
- Label: Bomp!
- Producer: Larry Thrasher

The Brian Jonestown Massacre chronology
Spacegirl & Other Favorites (1995)	Take It from the Man! (1996)	Their Satanic Majesties' Second Request (1996)

Take It from the Man! is the third studio album by American psychedelic rock band the Brian Jonestown Massacre. After recording their shoegaze-influenced debut album Methodrone (1995) and releasing a collection of early recordings, Spacegirl & Other Favorites, the band took influence from 1960s British psychedelic garage rock and recorded Take it from the Man! from November 1995–February 1996. After recording the entire album with an unnamed producer who scrapped the recordings, the band re-recorded the album on a minimal budget, mostly at Lifesource Studios in Emeryville, California with production from Psychic TV's Larry Thrasher, whose usual "studio" approach was vetoed out by the band's back-to-basics approach.

The album's psychedelic garage rock has often been compared to the Rolling Stones. Released by Bomp! Records on May 28, 1996, it is the first of three full-length albums released by the band in 1996, preceding Their Satanic Majesties' Second Request and Thank God for Mental Illness. The album was released to critical acclaim, with journalists praising the exuding of its influences and spirit. Frontman Anton Newcombe has since named the album as one of his favorites by the band. The album has featured in several "best of" lists and has been cited by several musicians as an influence. "Straight Up and Down", which is featured in two alternate versions on the album, later became the theme music for Boardwalk Empire.

== Background ==
In 1995, the Brian Jonestown Massacre, led by frontman Anton Newcombe, along with bassist Matt Hollywood, guitarist Dean Taylor, organist Mara Regal, accordionist Dawn Thomas, drummer Brian Glaze, and "Spokesman for the Revolution" Joel Gion released their debut album Methodrone which featured a shoegazing-influenced style. Although the album was critically acclaimed, the band never returned the album's sound "in full," and issued Spacegirl & Other Favorites later in the year, a collection of the band's earliest recordings from 1993. Looking for a change in direction, and under the influence of 1960s British rock music, the band soon began work on Take it from the Man!. In the liner notes, Newcombe jokingly recalls the album's conception:

"I, Anton A. Newcombe, do solemnly swear that the ghost of Brian Jones came to me in the studio and asked me to make this record. P.S. He also asked that I kick the shit out of old Mick and Keith for ripping off his band, girl and money, having him murdered, being glad he's dead, and for not being very nice people."

== Recording ==
According to the liner notes, Take It from the Man! was recorded "live" between November 1995 and February 1996 at Dance Home Studio and Larry Thrasher's Lifesource Studios in Emeryville, California, with digital editing undertaken at Music Box, Hollywood. The band initially recorded Take It from the Man! with an unnamed producer who, in wanting to "get on board", recorded the album and "chopped it up to make it like so perfect" and then requested 3% of the royalties, leading the band to "just [laugh] in his face." As a result, the producer, as Newcombe recalled it, "got so pissed and he said he was going to destroy the recording. I was like, 'Fuck you dude. Then I'm gonna kick your ass the minute I see you on the street.' He did end up destroying it but I let him off the hook as far as the violence."

" Larry Thrasher from Psychic TV was interested and told us how Genesis [P-Orridge] had seen our band and somehow conversation started and Larry wanted to produce us so he borrowed this studio from Counting Crows or something for us to record in."

— Anton Newcombe.

With the band needing to re-record the album in its entirety, Larry Thrasher from Psychic TV became interested in the band and producing the album, and borrowed a recording studio, possibly belonging to Counting Crows, for the band to record in, presumably his Lifesource Studios credited in the liner notes. Newcombe stated that, with a line-up of Newcombe, Dean Taylor (guitar), Matt Hollywood (bass) and Brian Glaze (drums), the band showed up on the day of recording without guitarist Jeff Davies because "he was a junkie" and so Newcombe's girlfriend Dawn played guitar instead. The album was recorded on a minimal budget.

When the band turned up to the studio, they were surprised to find that Thrasher had "about sixteen microphones set up for the drums," because the band preferred a stripped down studio approach; Newcombe stated that "I asked him, 'What the hell is this?' and he said, 'Well, these are for the drums…' and I was like, 'We don't need sixteen mics for the drums. Take all of these away. I'm gonna use three mics for the drums and we're gonna record it live, all at once. We're just gonna put all the guitar amps down the hallway, the drums will be in here, and we'll put on headphones and we'll just play our set.' We record everything the same way, so that's what we did and then at the end he whipped out all of these effects when mixing at his studio and I just asked him, 'What are all of these for?' and he said, 'You can't have it sound the same on every song' and I'm like 'Bullshit, that's the charm of this,' we just try and get a certain sound." Newcombe noted that "Straight Up and Down" was mixed to cassette.

The band were recording their follow up album Their Satanic Majesties' Second Request (1996) concurrently with Take It from the Man!, although not in the same studio or with the same producer. Newcombe recalled "recording Take It from the Man in the day time and then recording Their Satanic Majesties' Second Request in the nighttime. I was doing them simultaneously. I would go and stay at this one studio and then take the train out to the other one so instead of being homeless I was going between these two studios and crashing on the couches and doing two, 18 song records at the same time."

== Music ==
Finding the band exploring further territory, Take It from the Man! was another change of style for the band, taking a large influence from 1960s British garage rock, particularly the early work of the Rolling Stones. The Phoenix New Times characterized the album as "psychedelic garage rock". Under the Radar said the album was "Rolling Stones-referencing," while Consequence of Sound said the record carried a "mid '60s era Stones rock & roll feel." Laut more broadly said the album "deals with British music from the 60s," noting "(David Bowie I Love You) Since I Was Six" as an example. Angel Fire said the album was "inspired by the gritty R&B of Aftermath or 12x5. The feedback and production is total 90's, but the style is straight 1964, and a glorious style it is." Joel Gion talked down the recognized similarities, saying "Take It from the Man was largely described as a December's Children nuts and bolts Rhythm & Blues sound. We don't purposely go out for that. We just like that music. I think there were higher standards for music during the '60s. You could take Top 40 music from then and check out the quality."

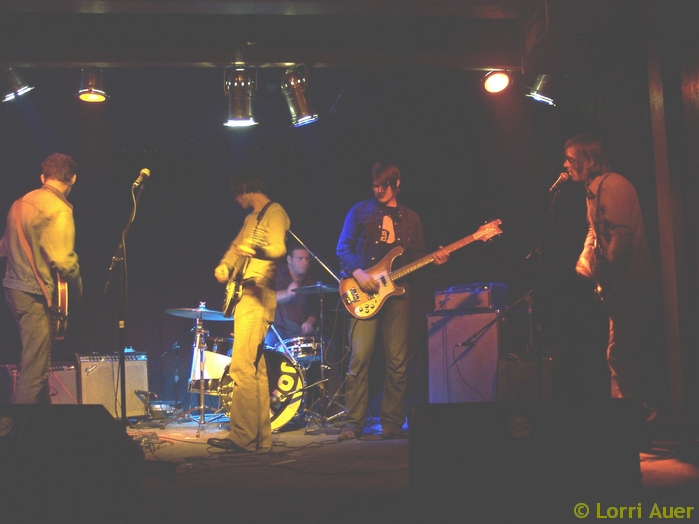
The Brian Jonestown Massacre in 2004.

All of the songs on Take It from the Man! were written by Newcombe, except for "Oh Lord", "B.S.A.", "Cabin Fever" and "In My Life", which were written by Matt Hollywood. Referring to the songs "Caress" and "Who?", Newcombe stated "I might have written those songs getting drunk up in Portland at Zia's Zia McCabe of the Dandy Warhols] house with everybody after a show. I used to really love writing songs in front of people with acoustic guitars or whatever just to show off with my mates, it used to make me really happy to be clever." Characterizing it as the album's epitome, Jason Ankeny of AllMusic said that opening song "Vacuum Boots" sets up the album's "gritty, swaggering R&B-influenced rock, delivered with remarkable assurance and attitude." "B.S.A." is an electric blues song which "[swaggers] like mad." "(David Bowie I Love You) Since I Was Six" is, as the name suggests, a tribute to David Bowie and has been described as "such a nice way to mix up the album."

"Dawn" was later re-recorded on the band's first and only album with TVT Records, Strung Out in Heaven (1998). The Village Voice characterized "Mary, Please" as "trippy with partially dejected yet sincere lyricism" and "filled with meticulously placed tambourine and cymbals." "Straight Up and Down", which "blisters with energy," appears twice on the album as two different takes of varying length on tracks 6 and 18. The long version of "Straight Up and Down", in particular, clearly indicates two of the band's biggest '60s influences, as by the final minutes of the song, the vocals mimic both the "Woo-woo!" backing vocals from the Rolling Stones' song "Sympathy for the Devil" and the "Na-na-na-na!" vocals from The Beatles' song "Hey Jude"; Ankeny described the song as an "epic finale."

== Release ==
Take It from the Man! was released on CD and double LP on May 28, 1996, by independent record label Bomp! Records as their second release on the label, and was the first of three albums that the band released that year, followed by Their Satanic Majesties' Second Request and Thank God for Mental Illness. The album was not a commercial success. In 2006, Tee Pee Records released two different anniversary double LP editions in the United States; the standard edition was printed on black vinyl while the special edition was printed on translucent blue and green vinyl. On June 25, 2007, Newcombe's A Records released a remastered CD edition in the UK, who also issued the translucent blue and orange double LP edition in the same country on August 16, 2010, and a remastered CD edition in the US on February 16, 2012.

The packaging of Take It from the Man! prominently features the Union Jack, reflecting the British influence on the album, and the American flag reflecting the band's home nation. Thrasher wrote an essay on his preference for analog recording over digital recording in the liner notes. After a Vendetta Mag journalist told Newcombe he "especially loved" the essay, Newcombe stated "I really like getting together with my friends and writing that kind of stuff. We just talk about ideas. So many people don't even have a clue why they're doing stuff or they can't tell you. They won't admit it. I really love music and I want to put out stuff that isn't out there. I don't care what people think...if they think it's derivative or invoking a certain time period or what have you. I'm just doing it because it's the music I like. It doesn't exist unless I animate it."

== Critical reception ==
Professional ratings
Review scores
Source	Rating
AllMusic	4.5/5 stars

The album was released to critical acclaim, with reviewers praising its influence and tight sound. AllMusic's Jason Ankeny described the album as "brilliant" and said that "singer Anton Newcombe is half madman and half shaman, and he commands each delirious moment with absolute mastery, emerging not so much a disciple of Mick Jagger but as a serious threat to the throne."" He said that tracks like "Who?," "(David Bowie I Love You) Since I Was Six," and "Straight Up and Down" are "simply amazing, evoking rock's golden age without ever disintegrating into slavish devotion–clearly, the BJM is a group that believes in killing their idols"

Skiddle called it a "classic" album. Pitchfork said that, alongside the band's other 1996 albums, Take it from the Man! "essentially mapped out the boundaries of their sound." Jumping Fences ranked the album at number 6 in their list of the top 10 albums of 1996. In 2014, French magazine Rock & Folk included the album in their list of "555 Disques 1954–2014: Soixante Ans de Rock'n'Roll" ("555 Records 1954–2014: Sixty Years of Rock 'n' Roll"). Alongside Thank God for Mental Illness, FasterLouder called it the band's "sublime high watermark."

== Legacy ==
In 1998, Newcombe stated that Take It from the Man!, alongside Give It Back!, Thank God for Mental Illness and Their Satanic Majesties Second Request were his favorite albums by the band; "I like those four records a lot." Amy Haben of Please Kill Me found similarities with the band's later album Mini Album Thingy Wingy (2015), saying the latter album is "reminiscent of their roots with genius melodies equivalent to 1996's Take It From The Man! only toned down a tad." In 2015, The Village Voice included "Mary, Please" in their list of "Ten Nineties Earworms That Just Get Better with Age," saying the song "isn't quite as dancy as 'Not If You Were the Last Dandy on Earth' or as mesmerizing as 'It Girl,' but it is just as essential and equally good." As the album was the first of three from the band in 1996, in 2014, Music Times included the band "7 Artists Who Released Multiple Classic Albums in One Year." "(David Bowie I Love You) Since I Was Six" was included on What Youth's" Stay Tuned playlist, praising the production and strained vocals.

Several bands have cited the record as an influence; Leon James Kenny of Black Sonic Revolver cited the album as an influence, saying "we always listen to BJM before recording or demoing, their creativity inspires us. I remember the bench I was sat on when I first heard BJM album Take It From The Man! – I bought it in Piccadilly Records in Manchester, only because it had the most songs on it. A friend said I'd love them, so took a punt. I had a "discman" on me that day, so I sat on a bench in Castlefield on a lovely day and pressed play. I'll never forget that first encounter," while in 2011, Kristin Warnken of the Glossines included the album in a list of five albums "in her music player." Rishi Dhir of Canadian indie rock band Elephant Stone included "Who?" in his list of "The Best of the Brian Jonestown Massacre".

In 2010, "Straight Up and Down" was used as the theme music for the popular television period drama series Boardwalk Empire starring Steve Buscemi on the American cable network HBO. Some fans were reported confused at the song's inclusion as the theme music over a piece of period-appropriate music; the series' creator Terence Winter explained "I wanted unexpected. I didn't want to do some Charleston, which didn't really kick in until 1924 anyway, and everything I heard from the period had people doing the Charleston." While experimenting with the opening, Winter says he paired the footage of one of its scenes with several different pieces of music before settling on "Straight Up and Down"; "I had been a fan of the Brian Jonestown Massacre, so we tried it, and I said to the editor, that really works for me."

== Track listing ==
All songs written and composed by The Brian Jonestown Massacre, except "Straight Up and Down" and "Monster", written by Newcombe and Jeff Davies.

No.	Title	Length
1.	"Vacuum Boots"	3:02
2.	"Who?"	2:53
3.	"Oh Lord"	3:20
4.	"Caress"	2:30
5.	"(David Bowie I Love You) Since I Was Six"	3:24
6.	"Straight Up and Down"	4:30
7.	"Monster"	3:16
8.	"Take It from the Man"	2:40
9.	"B.S.A."	4:32
10.	"Mary, Please"	4:10
11.	"Monkey Puzzle"	4:03
12.	"Fucker"	2:12
13.	"Dawn"	2:00
14.	"Cabin Fever"	7:56
15.	"In My Life"	2:22
16.	"The Be Song"	3:26
17.	"My Man Syd"	1:50
18.	"Straight Up and Down [long version]"	11:07
Total length:		69:13

== Personnel ==
- Anton Newcombe – guitar, bass, organ, mellotron, drums, vocals
- Matt Hollywood – bass, guitar, vocals
- Dean Taylor – guitar
- Dawn Thomas – guitar
- Brian Glaze – drums
- Joel Gion – percussion
- Mara Keagle – guitar
- Jeffery Davies - Guitar
