= Diamond dust (disambiguation) =

Diamond dust is a ground-level cloud composed of tiny ice crystals.

Diamond dust may also refer to:

== Arts and entertainment ==
=== Film ===
- Diamond Dust (2018 film), a 2018 Egyptian film
- Bleach: The DiamondDust Rebellion, a 2007 Japanese anime film

=== Literature ===
- Diamond Dust, an 1880 book by Jennie Fowler Willing
- Sweet Diamond Dust and Other Stories, a 1989 short story collection by Rosario Ferré
- Diamond Dust and Other Stories, a 2000 short story collection by Anita Desai
- Diamond Dust, a 2002 novel by Peter Lovesey

=== Music ===
- "Diamond Dust", a song by Jeff Beck from the 1975 album Blow by Blow
- "Diamond Dust", a song by Way Out West from the 2017 album Tuesday Maybe

== Other uses ==
- Diamond dust, a profissional wrestling aerial technique innovated by Masato Tanaka
- Diamond Dust, the codename of a nuclear test conducted as part of Operation Mandrel and Project Vela Uniform
- Diamond Dust, glitter particles developed by artist Stuart Semple

== See also ==
- Diamond powder, small diamonds used as an abrasive
