= Spacewoman =

Spacewoman or space woman may refer to:

- Women in space, women who have traveled to outer space
  - List of women astronauts
- Space Woman, a 1998 album by Selina Martin
- Spacer Woman, a 1983 song by British rock band Charlie
- Spacewomen, fictional characters in the 1980 kaiju film Gamera: Super Monster

== See also ==
- Women in space (disambiguation)
- Spacegirl (disambiguation)
- Spaceman (disambiguation)
- Lady Astronaut (disambiguation)
- The Space Lady (born 1948), American musician
- Memoirs of a Spacewoman, a 1962 science fiction novel by Naomi Mitchison
