= Spacegirl =

Spacegirl or Space Girl may refer to:

== Music ==
- "Spacegirl", a song by The Brian Jonestown Massacre from the 1995 album Spacegirl and Other Favorites
- "Spacegirl", a song by The Killjoys from the 1996 album Gimme Five
- "Spacegirl", a song by Drugstore from the 1998 album White Magic for Lovers
- "Spacegirl Blues", a song by Gerald V. Casale from the 2005 album Kamchatka
- Spacegirls, a 2015 album by Hästköttskandalen
- "Space Girl", a 2020 song by Frances Forever

== Other uses ==
- SpaceGirl, original name of 1990s video game No Gravity
- "The Spacegirls", a 1997 comic published in 2000 AD comics
- Space Girl and Bird, a 2003 painting by Banksy
- Spacegirl, a 2008 comic by Travis Charest
- Zita the Spacegirl, a 2011–2014 trilogy of graphic novels by Ben Hatke

== See also ==
- Spacewoman (disambiguation)
- Spaceboy (disambiguation)
- Spice Girl (disambiguation)
