= Why Try =

Why Try may refer to:

- "Why Try", a song by Ariana Grande from My Everything
- "Why Try", a song by Chastity Belt from Time to Go Home
- "Why Try", a song by Green Velvet from the deluxe edition of Whatever
- "Why Try", a song by J.R. Writer from History in the Making
- "Why Try", a song by the Kaleidoscope from Side Trips
- "Why Try", a song by Limp Bizkit from Gold Cobra
- "Why Try", a song by Ginger Root
- "Why Try", a song by Tank and the Bangas
- "Why Try", a song by Young Summer
