= Mindcircus =

Single by Way Out West featuring Tricia Lee Kelshall

from the album Intensify
- Released: 17 April 2002
- Length: 5:47
- Label: Distinct'ive (UK); Nettwerk (US); Black Hole (remixes)
- Songwriter(s): Jody Wisternoff; Nick Warren; Tricia Lee Kelshall; Imogen Heap
- Producer(s): Wisternoff; Warren

Way Out West singles chronology
"Intensify" (2001)	"Mindcircus" (2002)	"Stealth" (2002)

Tricia Lee Kelshall singles chronology
"Mindcircus" (2002)	"Sensify Me" (2012)

"Mindcircus" is a song by English electronic music duo Way Out West featuring singer Tricia Lee Kelshall. It was released on 17 April 2002 through Distinct'ive Records, as the third single from Way Out West's second studio album Intensify. The song peaked at #39 in the UK Singles Chart in 2002, and reached number 1 in the UK Dance Chart. The popularity of the song was extended by a remix from Gabriel & Dresden, which featured on Tiësto's In Search of Sunrise 3: Panama.

== Background ==
Following "Intensify", "Mindcircus" was released as the third single from Intensify. In 2002, Black Hole released Mindcircus (Remixes) which reached #6 on Billboard's US Dance Club Songs chart. A music video for the song was also filmed.

BBC Music's 2002 review of Intensify described the song positively, praising Trisha Lee Kelshall's vocal performance. Christian Hopwood wrote "Trisha Lee Kelshall provides a firm tie to their house moorings as her vocals chisel a melancholy edge to the lush arrangements of "Mindcircus"".

== Formats and track listings ==
CD single
No.	Title	Length
1.	"Mindcircus" (Original Radio Edit)	3:33
2.	"Mindcircus" (Gabriel & Dresden Radio Edit)	3:42
3.	"Mindcircus" (Phunk Investigation Remix)	6:25
4.	"Mindcircus" (Fred Numf vs Etienne Overdijk Remix)	6:04

Mindcircus (Remixes)
No.	Title	Length
1.	"Mindcircus" (Gabriel & Dresden Club Mix)	9:35
2.	"Mindcircus" (Phunk Investigation Dub)	7:49
3.	"Mindcircus" (Tarrentella: Redanka Dub)	9:24

Digital download
No.	Title	Length
1.	"Mindcircus" (Original Radio Edit)	3:34
2.	"Mindcircus" (Gabriel & Dresden Radio Edit)	3:55
3.	"Mindcircus" (Phunk Investigation Remix)	7:28
4.	"Mindcircus" (Fred Numf vs Ettienne Overdijk Remix)	7:35
5.	"Mindcircus" (Way Out West Club Mix)	7:36
6.	"Mindcircus" (Gabriel & Dresden Club Mix)	10:30
7.	"Mindcircus" (Tarrentella - Redanka Dub Mix)	9:40
8.	"Mindcircus" (Original)	5:47
9.	"Mindcircus" (Phunk Investigation Dub Mix)	7:55
10.	"Mindcircus" (Tarrentella - Redanka Vocal Mix)	10:32
11.	"Mindcircus" (Jay Walsh Black Ice Remix)	9:17
12.	"Mindcircus" (Phunk Investigation Edit)	3:36

== Charts ==
Chart (2002)	Peak position
UK Singles Chart (OCC)	39
UK Dance Chart (OCC)	1
US Dance Club Songs (Billboard)	15

Remixes

Chart (2002)	Peak position
US Dance Club Songs (Billboard)	6

== See also ==
- List of UK Dance Singles Chart number ones of 2002
