= Green Velvet (album) =

Compilation album by Green Velvet

Compilation album by Green Velvet
- Released: April 25, 2000
- Genre: Techno; house
- Length: 71:58
- Label: F-111/Warner Bros. Records
- Producer: Green Velvet

Green Velvet chronology
The Nineties (1993 A.D. Through 1999 A.D.) (1999)	Green Velvet (2000)	Whatever (2001)

Green Velvet is a compilation album by Green Velvet. It was released on F-111/Warner Bros. Records in 2000.

== Critical reception ==
Professional ratings
Review scores
Source	Rating
AllMusic	4.5/5 stars
The New Rolling Stone Album Guide	4/5 stars

Andy Kellman of AllMusic stated that "the compilation is an endless barrage of slick spots, surely enough to entertain and convert and definitely a concise way to please the already informed." M. Tye Comer of CMJ New Music Report wrote, "In his deep, monotone drawl, Velvet (the alter ego of Chicago house producer Curtis A. Jones, a.k.a. Cajmere) humorously muses about his life's many miseries over tough drum beats and sparse, yet gritty '80s synthesizers." Michael Paoletta of Billboard described it as "A quirky mix of trance, techno, electro, and house". The songs “Percolator,” “Flash,” and many others were recorded, engineered and mixed by Jerome Mikulich of the Playroom Recording Studio, which was located in Chicago Heights, IL, and was relocated in 1994 to downtown Chicago, IL, on 520 N. Michigan Ave.

== Track listing ==
All tracks are written by Green Velvet.

No.	Title	Length
1.	"Flash"	5:47
2.	"Answering Machine"	4:49
3.	"The Stalker"	6:26
4.	"Coïtus (Remix)"	5:28
5.	"Land of the Lost"	4:08
6.	"Thoughts"	4:17
7.	"Water Molecule"	6:27
8.	"Leave My Body"	4:53
9.	"Destination Unknown"	7:56
10.	"Percolator 2000"	3:09
11.	"The Red Light"	4:37
12.	"Abduction"	5:03
13.	"Help Me" (hidden track)	8:56
