= Way Out West (Way Out West album) =

Studio album by Way Out West
- Released: 1 September 1997
- Recorded: 1994−97
- Genre: Big beat; trip hop; progressive house
- Length: 67:12
- Label: Deconstruction Records
- Producer: Jody Wisternoff; Nick Warren

Way Out West chronology
Way Out West (1997)	Intensify (2001)

Singles from Way Out West
- 1. "Ajare" Released: 3 November 1994; 2. "Domination" Released: 16 February 1996; 3. "The Gift" Released: 2 September 1996; 4. "Blue" Released: 18 August 1997

Professional ratings
Review scores
Source	Rating
AllMusic	4/5 stars
Music Week	3/5 stars

Way Out West is the debut studio album by English electronic music duo Way Out West. It was released on 1 September 1997 by the since defunct record label Deconstruction Records, and peaked at 42 in the UK Albums Chart that year. The album includes its four singles, "Ajare", "The Gift", "Domination", and "Blue".

== Background ==
The album's release was promoted by its four singles: "Ajare", "The Gift", "Domination" and "Blue", all released on Deconstruction Records. "The Gift" remains the group's highest charted song on the UK Singles Chart to date, peaking at number #15. Both "The Gift" and "Domination" peaked at number 2 on the UK Dance Chart. Despite its success, the album does not have record of charting outside of the UK.

Several samples from various music were used to create the album. On the topic of sampling, Wisternoff stated in an interview that "beforehand we ... came from poor backgrounds where we had (...) a sampler ... So we *had* to sample to get the sounds we imagined of." Most notably, "Blue" loosely samples the melody of the theme from the film Withnail and I, "The Gift" samples Joanna Law's cover of "The First Time Ever I Saw Your Face", (titled "First Time Ever") and "Ajare" samples "Do Your Dance" by Rose Royce.

== Critical reception ==
Upon release, Way Out West was met with positive reviews from critics. John Bush from Allmusic summarised the album as "a varied, engaging debut". In a review of Way Out West's second studio album Intensify, Christian Hopwood from BBC Music commented that "it [Intensify] might lack the variety of the first album [Way Out West]", he also praised "King of the Funk", describing it as "excellent".

== Track listing ==
No.	Title	Writer(s)	Length
1.	"Blue"	Jody Wisternoff; Nick Warren; David Dundas; Rick Wentworth	5:16
2.	"The Gift" (featuring Joanna Law)	Wisternoff; Warren; Ewan MacColl; Jason Greenhalgh; Brian Smith	7:21
3.	"Domination" (Mururoa Mix)	Wisternoff; Warren	8:41
4.	"Dancehall Tornado"	Wisternoff; Warren	7:45
5.	"Questions Never Answered"	Wisternoff; Warren	8:44
6.	"Sequoia"	Wisternoff; Warren	8:01
7.	"Ajare"	Wisternoff; Warren; Tilat Siddiqui	5:44
8.	"Drive By"	Wisternoff; Warren	6:39
9.	"King of the Funk"	Wisternoff; Warren; Cesar Marin; David Lee Roth; Michael Anthony	5:38
10.	"Earth"	Wisternoff; Warren; Alison Cole	3:17
Total length:			67:12

== Charts ==
Chart	Peak position
UK Albums Chart (OCC)	42

== Personnel ==
Way Out West

- Jody Wisternoff – Keyboards, synths, samples, programming (all tracks)
- Nick Warren – Engineering, mixing (all tracks)

Sampled artists

- Joanna Law – Vocals (track 2)
- David Dundas – Writing, arrangement (track 1)
- Rick Wentworth – Writing, arrangement (track 1)
- Ewan MacColl – Writing, arrangement (track 2)
- T. Siddique – Writing, arrangement (track 7)
- Cesar Marin – Writing, arrangement (track 9)
- David Lee Roth – Writing, arrangement (track 9)
- Eddie Van Halen – Guitar (track 9)
- Michael Anthony – Writing, arrangement (track 9)
- Thomas Chong – Vocals (track 9)
- Alison Cole – Writing, arrangement, guitar (track 10)

== In popular culture ==
- "The Gift" was performed live on an episode of the British television program Top of the Pops.
- "Domination (Mururoa Mix)" was the version featured on the album (uncredited on CD and vinyl versions, credited on music download track listing).
- "King of the Funk" was featured on the 1998 compilation album Dope On Plastic! 5.
- On music download stores, the album's release date was written as "1990" (for unknown reasons) but later changed to "1 January 1997"
- "Earth", the last track, (and the "Earth (Waveform Remix)") features a quote (twice, near the beginning and near the end) from H. G. Wells' 1895 novella, The Time Machine, "the whole surface of the earth seemed changed, melting and flowing under my eyes". The unique mysterious male voice sounds like actor/director John Huston or actor/director Leonard Nimoy. Nimoy did a 1994 adaptation yet the audio sampled is not from that Nimoy recording nor many of the audio book versions and movie available on YouTube, if they even include that quote in their adaptation.
- "Ajare" was used by ITV during their Formula One coverage as part of a highlights package of the 1997 season.
