= Spice Boys =

Spice Boys may refer to:

- Spice Boys (footballers), a group of Liverpool F.C. players from the 1990s
- Spice Boys (House of Representatives of the Philippines), a group of Filipino congressmen

== See also ==
- Spice Girl (disambiguation)
