= Back to Mine: Nick Warren =

Mixtape by Nick Warren
- Released: 1999
- Genres: Progressive house, trance
- Label: Ultra
- Compiler: Nick Warren

Nick Warren chronology
Global Underground 008: Brazil (1998)	Back to Mine: Nick Warren (1999)	Global Underground 011: Budapest (1999)

Back to Mine: Nick Warren is a DJ mix album, the first in the Back to Mine series, compiled and mixed by Nick Warren.

The mix focuses on downtempo tracks, with Allmusic calling it "a smart and non-confrontational mix safe from predawn noise complaints". CMJ New Music Report called it a "felicitous cocktail of psilocybin and mescaline".

Iain Stewart, in The Rough Guide to Ibiza and Formentera, viewed Warren's mix as one of the best in the series.

== Track listing ==
No.	Title	Original Artist	Length
1.	"The Mission"	Sequential	1:57
2.	"Warmth Reheated"	Talismantra	6:54
3.	"This Way"	Skanna	6:46
4.	"This Love" (feat. Elizabeth Fraser)	Craig Armstrong	5:54
5.	"Autumn Leaves (Irresistible Force Remix)"	Coldcut	9:22
6.	"Go (Jam and Spoon in Dub Mix)"	Moby	6:38
7.	"Wormhole"	Glide	3:22
8.	"Gutaris Breeze"	John Beltran	6:48
9.	"Spiritual Technology"	Symbiosis	5:00
10.	"Past"	Sub Sub	2:38
11.	"La Chatte Rouge"	Affaires a Faire	4:44
12.	"Part-y-time"	Gianni Marchetti	3:14
13.	"Space Van"	Glide	9:00
