= Walk in Love =

Studio album by Green Velvet
- Released: 2005
- Genres: House; techno
- Length: 55:17
- Label: Relief Records
- Producer: Green Velvet

Green Velvet chronology
Whatever (2001)	Walk in Love (2005)	Lost & Found (2009)

Professional ratings
Review scores
Source	Rating
AllMusic	3/5 stars

Walk in Love is the third studio album by Green Velvet. It was released on Relief Records in 2005.

== Track listing ==
All tracks are written by Green Velvet.

No.	Title	Length
1.	"UFOs"	3:15
2.	"Temptation"	4:40
3.	"Overcome the Flesh"	3:17
4.	"No Sex"	4:26
5.	"Walk in Love"	5:01
6.	"War on the Saints"	4:03
7.	"Other Side"	5:23
8.	"Bathroom"	4:05
9.	"Cuz of U"	3:46
10.	"Victory"	6:18
11.	"Come Back"	5:27
12.	"Pin-Up Girl"	5:36

== Personnel ==
Credits adapted from the CD edition's liner notes.

- Green Velvet – vocals, production
