= The Gift (Way Out West song) =

Single by Way Out West featuring Miss Joanna Law

from the album Way Out West
- Released: 2 September 1996; 15 March 2010 (re-release)
- Length: 7:20
- Label: Deconstruction Records
- Songwriters: Jody Wisternoff; Nick Warren; Nick Bracegirdle
- Producers: Wisternoff; Warren

Way Out West singles chronology
"Domination" (1996)	"The Gift" (1996)	"Blue" (1997)

Joanna Law singles chronology
"You're Mine" (1992)	"The Gift" (1996)	"Forgiveness" (2000)

"The Gift" is a song by English electronic music duo Way Out West featuring English singer Joanna Law, credited as Miss Joanna Law. It was released on the since defunct record label Deconstruction Records on 2 September 1996. The song reached #15 on the UK Singles Chart that year, and also peaked at #2 on the UK Dance Chart. It is the third single from their eponymous debut studio album, Way Out West (1997).

== Background ==
The song uses a sample from Joanna Law's cover of "The First Time Ever I Saw Your Face", titled "First Time Ever". After its release, a music video for the song was also filmed. The song has been featured on many compilation albums, including Judge Jules' Trance Nation Anthems on Ministry of Sound.

"The Gift" received a 2010 update when Deconstruction re-released the song with additional remixes by Gui Boratto, Michael Woods, Tek-One and Way Out West themselves. The group's own remix of the song featured on their 2010 remix album, We Love Machine – The Remixes.

== Formats and track listings ==
CD single
No.	Title	Length
1.	"The Gift" (Radio Edit)	4:25
2.	"The Gift" (Original Mix)	7:20
3.	"The Gift" (Club Mix)	8:18

Vinyl
No.	Title	Length
1.	"The Gift" (Original Mix)	7:20
2.	"The Gift" (Club Mix)	8:18

2010 remixes
No.	Title	Length
1.	"The Gift" (Way Out West's 2010 Remix)	7:54
2.	"The Gift" (Gui Boratto's Fallopian Remix)	7:43
3.	"The Gift" (Michael Woods Remix)	6:45
4.	"The Gift" (Tek-One Remix)	6:25

== In popular culture ==
- The song is featured as the theme music for the 1998 MTV music television series, True Life.
- The song was performed live on the British television show Top of the Pops in 1996.
- Portions of the song were used in a British television commercial for Halifax bank in 1996/97.

== Charts ==
Chart (1996)	Peak position
UK Singles Chart (OCC)	15
UK Dance Chart (OCC)	2
UK Airplay (Music Week)	28
US Dance Club Songs (Billboard)	39
