= Constant Chaos =

Studio album by Green Velvet
- Released: January 25, 1999
- Genre: Techno; house
- Length: 73:20
- Label: Music Man Records
- Producer: Green Velvet

Green Velvet chronology
Constant Chaos (1999)	The Nineties (1993 A.D. Through 1999 A.D.) (1999)

Constant Chaos is the debut studio album by Green Velvet. It was released on Music Man Records in 1999.

== Critical reception ==
Professional ratings
Review scores
Source	Rating
AllMusic	4/5 stars

John Bush of AllMusic wrote, "Though none of the previous Green Velvet club favorites are reprised for his album, Cajmere has created a raft of future classics, all along the same lines." Peter Margasak of Chicago Reader commented that "his austere mix of robotic rhythms, analog synth squelches, and occasionally hallucinatory lyrics sounds like nothing else out there." Richard Brophy of Hot Press described the album as "a minefield of personal traumas and reflections on the woes of our world".

== Track listing ==
All tracks are written by Green Velvet

No.	Title	Length
1.	"Thoughts"	5:02
2.	"Coïtus"	8:45
3.	"Abduction"	5:04
4.	"Save the World"	4:43
5.	"Electrocution"	5:42
6.	"Happy"	4:51
7.	"Strange"	7:13
8.	"Technology's Out of Control"	7:22
9.	"Water Molecule"	7:02
10.	"Killer Bees"	6:54
11.	"Stormy Weather"	4:59
12.	"Pursuit"	5:16

== Personnel ==
Credits adapted from the CD edition's liner notes.

- Green Velvet – vocals, instruments, production, engineering
- The Misfits – additional vocals (2)
- Michael Voltattorni – photography
- Phreddy Lee – photography
