= Spaceboy =

Spaceboy or Space Boy may refer to:

- Space Boy (1973 film), a short film
- "Spaceboy", a song by the Smashing Pumpkins from the 1993 album Siamese Dream
- Space Boy, a fictional character in the 1998–2004 TV series Rolie Polie Olie
- Spaceboy, an alias of Luther Hargreeves, a fictional character in The Umbrella Academy comic book series
- "Space Boy", a 2007 novella by Orson Scott Card
- Space Boy, an ongoing webcomic by Stephen McCranie (WebToons)

== See also ==
- Spaceman (disambiguation)
- Spacegirl (disambiguation)
- Space Cowboy (disambiguation)
- Boy in Space, a Swedish singer-songwriter
- "Hallo Spaceboy", a 1995 song by David Bowie
- Space Boy Soran, or Zoran, Space Boy, a 1965–1966 Japanese TV series
- "A Space Boy Dream", a song by Belle and Sebastian from the 1998 album The Boy with the Arab Strap
