= The Nineties (1993 A.D. Through 1999 A.D.) =

Compilation album by Green Velvet
- Released: October 25, 1999
- Recorded: 1993–1999
- Genre: Techno; house
- Length: 76:59
- Label: Music Man Records
- Producer: Green Velvet

Green Velvet chronology
Constant Chaos (1999)	The Nineties (1993 A.D. Through 1999 A.D.) (1999)	Green Velvet (2000)

The Nineties (1993 A.D. Through 1999 A.D.) is a compilation album by Green Velvet. It was released on Music Man Records in 1999.

== Critical reception ==
Professional ratings
Review scores
Source	Rating
AllMusic	4/5 stars

Prasad Bidaye of Exclaim! wrote, "For those who've never had the Green Velvet experience, this 12-track best-of compilation makes for a good introduction, featuring most of his classic tracks." He added, "Considering how techno purists tend to celebrate its conventional instrumental form, Green Velvet's bizarre narratives reclaim the human voice as an organic, yet estranged force in music."

== Track listing ==
All tracks are written by Green Velvet.

No.	Title	Length
1.	"Flash"	7:10
2.	"Answering Machine"	5:33
3.	"The Red Light"	4:38
4.	"Land of the Lost"	5:10
5.	"The Stalker"	6:26
6.	"Coïtus (Remix)"	5:26
7.	"Thoughts"	5:02
8.	"Leave My Body"	5:08
9.	"Water Molecule"	7:02
10.	"Help Me"	9:27
11.	"Destination Unknown"	9:11
12.	"Preacher Man"	8:21
