= Spice Girl (disambiguation) =

A Spice Girl is a member of English girl group the Spice Girls.

Spice Girl may also refer to:

- "Spice Girl", a song by rapper Aminé on the album Good for You
- Spice Girl, a character in JoJo's Bizarre Adventure
- "Spice Girl", an episode of JoJo's Bizarre Adventure: Golden Wind

== See also ==
- Spice Boys (disambiguation)
