= Intensify =

Studio album by Way Out West
- Released: 20 August 2001
- Genre: Trance; trip hop
- Length: 64:05
- Label: Distinct'ive Records
- Producer: Jody Wisternoff; Nick Warren

Way Out West chronology
Way Out West (1997)	Intensify (2001)	Don't Look Now (2004)

Singles from Intensify
- 1. "The Fall" Released: 27 November 2000; 2. "Intensify" Released: 6 August 2001; 3. "Mindcircus" Released: 17 April 2002; 4. "Stealth" Released: 19 August 2002

Professional ratings
Review scores
Source	Rating
AllMusic	3/5 stars
BBC	Positive

Intensify is the second studio album by English electronic music duo Way Out West, released on 20 August 2001 by Distinct'ive Records. The album was marked by a move from the defunct Deconstruction Records label to Distinctive, and a change in their sound, from club instrumentals and sampled vocals to a mixture of club tracks and original songs.

== Release ==
On 27 November 2000, Way Out West released the album's first single, "The Fall", through BMG; the former parent company of the group's previous label Deconstruction Records (defunct in 1998). "The Fall" peaked at #61 on the UK Singles Chart and was followed by the group's final release on BMG, the UB Devoid EP. In 2001, the group were signed to Distinct'ive Records, and released the album's second single and title track, "Intensify", shortly before the album's release date, on 6 August 2001. “Distinct'ive” then released Intensify worldwide on 20 August 2001 to success, with the album peaking at #61 on the UK Albums Chart.

In 2002, after the album's release, its third single "Mindcircus" (featuring Tricia Lee Kelshall) was released and, supported by a remix from Gabriel & Dresden, reached number 1 in the UK Dance Chart that year. The album's final single, "Stealth" (featuring Kirsty Hawkshaw), was released on 19 August 2002 and reached #67 on the UK Singles Chart that year.

The track "Activity" appears on the soundtrack to the 2001 PlayStation 2 videogame, Kinetica.

=== Artwork ===
The front cover art features a photograph of southern San Francisco's Bernal Heights, Portola and Bayview neighborhoods around sunrise, visibly including the Bayshore Freeway, Bayview Park, Candlestick Park stadium and San Francisco Bay.

== Critical reception ==
Upon release, Intensify was met with generally positive reviews from critics. Dean Carlson from Allmusic summarised the album as "a glittering, expressive trance record". Christian Hopwood from BBC Music commented that "it might lack the variety of the first album (Way Out West)", although he also praised the album, claiming it has a "wide screen, cinematic feel".

== Track listing ==
No.	Title	Writer(s)	Length
1.	"The Fall" (album edit)	Jody Wisternoff; Nick Warren; Kosma; Mercer; Parsons; Prévert	7:08
2.	"Activity"	Wisternoff; Warren	4:50
3.	"Call Me"	Wisternoff; Warren	4:44
4.	"Hypnotise"	Wisternoff; Warren; Edward Barton	5:56
5.	"Sharkhunt"	Wisternoff; Warren	5:33
6.	"Stealth" (featuring Kirsty Hawkshaw)	Wisternoff; Warren; Kirsty Hawkshaw; Birgitte Birnie	5:43
7.	"UB Devoid"	Wisternoff; Warren	4:58
8.	"Mindcircus" (featuring Tricia Lee Kelshall)	Wisternoff; Warren; Tricia Kelshall; Imogen Heap	5:47
9.	"Secret"	Wisternoff; Warren	6:58
10.	"Intensify Part 1"	Wisternoff; Warren; Ally Kennen	6:58
11.	"Intensify Part 2"	Wisternoff; Warren; Kennen; A Watson	5:25
Total length:			64:05

Digital bonus track
No.	Title	Length
12.	"The Fall" (Bedrock Dub Vocal Mix)	9:58

== Personnel ==
=== Way Out West ===
- Jody Wisternoff - production, keyboards, synths, samples, drum programming
- Nick Warren - production, keyboards, engineering, mixing

=== Additional musicians ===
- Adam Pickard - drums ("Mindcircus") additional programming ("Call Me", "Stealth")
- Ally Kennen - vocals ("Intensify (Part 01)", "Intensify (Part 02)")
- Imogen Heap - writing ("Mindcircus")
- Tricia Lee Kelshall - vocals ("Mindcircus")
- Kirsty Hawkshaw - vocals ("Stealth")

== Charts ==
Chart	Peak position
UK Albums Chart (OCC)	61

== Release history ==
Country	Date	Format	Label
Worldwide	20 August 2001	CD, Digital download	Distinct'ive Records
Worldwide	1 September 2001	Vinyl	Distinct'ive Records
