= Green Velvet =

American electronic musician

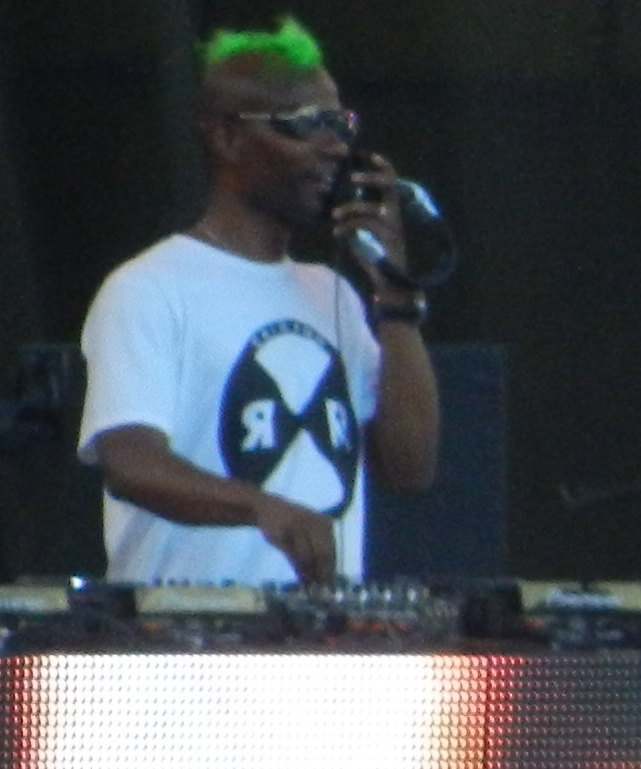
- Green Velvet performing at the 2012 Spring Awakening Music Festival

Background information
- Also known as: Cajmere; Geo Vogt; Half Pint; Curan Stone; Gino Vittori
- Born: Curtis Alan Jones; April 26, 1968 (age 58); Chicago, Illinois, U.S.
- Genres: House; techno
- Occupations: Singer; record producer; DJ
- Years active: 1991–present
- Labels: Relief; Cajual; Music Man; F-111/Warner Bros.
- Website: www.cajual.com

Curtis Alan Jones (born April 26, 1968), better known by his stage name Green Velvet, is an American disc jockey, singer and record producer. He is also known as Cajmere, Geo Vogt, Half Pint, Curan Stone, and Gino Vittori.

== Early life ==
Curtis Alan Jones was born on April 26, 1968, in Chicago, Illinois. He grew up listening to blues, jazz, funk, and rock. In the mid 1980s, he was introduced to house music via the radio. He started making music with a "sixty-buck keyboard, a cheap four-track and a cheap drum machine".

Jones graduated from the University of Illinois at Urbana–Champaign with a degree in chemical engineering. After attending the University of California, Berkeley, he moved back to Chicago in 1991.

== Career ==
In 1991, Jones started releasing his music under the Cajmere moniker. In 1992, he founded a record label, Cajual Records. In that year, he released a collaborative single with Dajae, titled "Brighter Days" that peaked at number 2 on the Billboard Hot Dance Music/Club Play chart. In the same year, he released the single "Coffee Pot (It's Time for the Percolator)" also known as "Percolator”, which was recorded at the Playroom Recording Studio by Jerome Mark Mikulich. Rolling Stone included it on its "20 Best Chicago House Records" list in 2014 while Mixmag included it on its "20 Best US Rave Anthems of the '90s" list in 2019. In 1993, he founded another label, Relief Records.

In 1995, he released a single, "Flash", under the Green Velvet moniker. It reached number 1 on the Billboard Dance Club Songs chart. Billboard included it on the "10 Essential '90s Rave Jams" list in 2019. Mixmag included it on the "20 Best US Rave Anthems of the '90s" list in 2019.

Green Velvet's debut studio album, Constant Chaos, was released in 1999. In 2000, he released a compilation album, Green Velvet. He released Whatever in 2001, Walk in Love in 2005, and Unshakable in 2013.

In 2014, he teamed up with Claude VonStroke to form the side project Get Real. The duo's debut single, "Mind Yo Bizness" / "Snuffaluffagus", was released in 2016. The duo's second single, "Jolean", was released in 2019.

In 2015, he released a collaborative album with Carl Craig, titled Unity.

DJ Mag has described Green Velvet as "a stalwart figure in both house and techno".

== Personal life ==
In the mid-2000s, Green Velvet revealed on Myspace that he had become a born-again Christian, after his drink was (allegedly) spiked with GHB.

== Discography ==
=== Studio albums ===
- Constant Chaos (1999) (as Green Velvet)
- Whatever (2001) (as Green Velvet)
- Walk in Love (2005) (as Green Velvet)
- Unshakable (2013) (as Green Velvet)
- Unity (2015) (as Green Velvet, with Carl Craig)

=== Compilation albums ===
- The Nineties (1993 A.D. Through 1999 A.D.) (1999) (as Green Velvet)
- Green Velvet (2000) (as Green Velvet)
- Lost & Found (2009) (as Green Velvet)
- It's Time (2010) (as Cajmere)
- Too Underground for the Main Stage (2013) (as Cajmere)

=== DJ mixes ===
- The Future Sound of Chicago: Cajual Relief (1995) (as Cajmere, with DJ Sneak)
- Wheels of Steel Vol. 1 (1997) (as Cajmere)
- Techno Funk (2000) (as Cajmere)
- Sessions (2006) (as Cajmere vs Green Velvet)

=== Extended plays ===
- Underground Goodies Vol. I (1991) (as Cajmere)
- Underground Goodies Vol. II (1992) (as Cajmere)
- Underground Goodies Vol. III (1992) (as Cajmere)
- Underground Goodies Vol. IV (1992) (as Cajmere)
- Dreaming (1992) (as Cajmere, with Derrick Carter)
- Underground Goodies (1993) (as Cajmere)
- Let Me Be (1993) (as Underground Goodies)
- Velvet Tracks (1993) (as Green Velvet)
- Underground Goodies Vol V (1994) (as Cajmere)
- Underground Goodies Vol. VI (1994) (as Cajmere)
- Destination Unknown (1997) (as Green Velvet)
- Chicago (2010) (as Cajmere, with Gene Farris)
- New Gotham (2010) (as Cajmere, with Gene Farris)
- The Chicago Jazz (2011) (as Cajmere, with Gene Farris)
- Elevated Tracks (2011) (as Cajmere, with Gene Farris)
- Go Dancing (2011) (as Cajmere, with Gene Farris)
- Chicago Style (2011) (as Cajmere, with Gene Farris)
- Playground (2011) (as Cajmere, with Gene Farris)
- White Label (2012) (as Cajmere, with Gene Farris)
- Black Label (2012) (as Cajmere, with Gene Farris)
- Taste of Chi-Town (2012) (as Cajmere, with Gene Farris)
- Jungle Love (2014) (as Cajmere, with Gene Farris)
- It's All About Me (2014) (as Green Velvet, with Jay Lumen)

=== Singles ===
- "Keep Movin'" (1991) (as Cajmere, with Nané)
- "Brighter Days" (1992) (as Cajmere, with Dajae)
- "Chit Chat" (1992) (as Cajmere)
- "Percolator" (1992) (as Cajmere)
- "Feelin' Kinda High" (1994) (as Cajmere)
- "Flash" (1995) (as Green Velvet)
- "Get Up Off Me" (1995) (as Cajmere, with Dajae)
- "H*rny" (1995) (as Cajmere)
- "Only 4 U" (1996) (as Cajmere)
- "The Stalker" (1996) (as Green Velvet)
- "Answering Machine" (1997) (as Green Velvet)
- "Lookin' for a Man" (1997) (as Cajmere)
- "Feelin'" (1998) (as Cajmere)
- "Nasty" (2001) (as Cajmere)
- "La La Land" (2001) (as Green Velvet)
- "Genedefekt" (2002) (as Green Velvet)
- "Coitus" (2002) (as Green Velvet)
- "Sometimes I Do" (2003) (as Cajmere, with Walter Phillips)
- "Midnight" (2004) (as Cajmere, with Walter Phillips)
- "I Need U" (2004) (as Cajmere, with Dajae)
- "Nude" (2004) (as Cajmere)
- "Come" (2004) (as Cajmere)
- "Powered" (2004) (as Cajmere)
- "House-Werk" (2004) (as Cajmere)
- "Say U Will" (2005) (as Cajmere, with Dajae)
- "The Bathroom" (2005) (as Green Velvet)
- "Temptation" (2005) (as Green Velvet)
- "No S*x" (2005) (as Green Velvet)
- "Cuz of You" (2005) (as Green Velvet)
- "Shake & Pop" (2006) (as Green Velvet)
- "Bigger than Prince" (2013) (as Green Velvet)
- "Voicemail" (2014) (as Green Velvet, with Patrick Topping)
- "Suga" (2015) (as Green Velvet, with Technasia)
- "Mind Yo Bizness" / "Snuffaluffagus" (2016) (as Green Velvet, with Claude VonStroke)
- "Keep Pushin' (Harder)" (2017) (as Green Velvet, with Riva Starr)
- "Jolean" (2019) (as Green Velvet, with Claude VonStroke)
- "Fuzion" (2019) (as Green Velvet, with Layton Giordani)
- "Unapologetic Raver" (2020) (as Green Velvet, with Eli Brown)
- "Critical" (2021) (as Green Velvet, with CamelPhat)
- "My Cheri" (2021) (as Green Velvet, with Mihalis Safras)
