= Tuesday Maybe =

Studio album by Way Out West
- Released: 16 June 2017
- Recorded: 2013–17
- Genre: Electronica; progressive house; chill-out; ambient
- Length: 57:59
- Label: Anjunadeep
- Producer: Jody Wisternoff; Nick Warren

Way Out West chronology
We Love Machine (2009)	Tuesday Maybe (2017)

Singles from Tuesday Maybe
- 1. "Tuesday Maybe" Released: 19 February 2016; 2. "Set My Mind" Released: 9 September 2016; 3. "Oceans" Released: 20 April 2017; 4. "The Call" Released: 19 May 2017; 5. "Slam" Released: 9 June 2017

Professional ratings
Review scores
Source	Rating
EDMtunes	(positive)
The Department of Dance	8/10
Flux BPM Online	10/10
The Nocturnal Times	8.1/10

Tuesday Maybe is the fifth studio album by English electronic music duo Way Out West, released on 16 June 2017 on Anjunadeep. It is the duo's first album after their near eight-year hiatus. The album was preceded with the release of its titular single on 19 February 2016, and "Set My Mind" on 9 September 2016. Additionally, three singles were released in the following year: "Oceans" (featuring Liu Bei), "The Call" (featuring Doe Paoro) and "Slam". On 2 February 2018, a remix album titled Tuesday Maybe (Remixed) was released on digital download stores. On 20 April 2018, an EP comprising chill-out mixes of tracks from the album, titled Sunday Maybe, was released.

== Background ==
After the release of the Way Out West's fourth studio album We Love Machine in 2009, Wisternoff and Warren briefly parted ways and pursued solo DJ and artist careers. In 2012, Wisternoff signed to Anjunadeep released his debut album as a solo artist, Trails We Blaze. He later began touring with Warren once again, and the duo reunited as Way Out West, touring with several tracks that would later feature on the album.

The duo signed to Anjunadeep in 2016 and began releasing singles for the album's release in the following year. On 16 June 2017, the album was released to positive reviews.

The album's title comes from the lyrics of "Petrococadollar" by Scritti Politti, which the title track, "Tuesday Maybe", samples.

== Track listing ==
No.	Title	Writer(s)	Length
1.	"Running Away" (featuring Eli & Fur)	Jody Wisternoff; Nick Warren; Eliza Noble; Jennifer Skillman	5:00
2.	"Set My Mind"	Wisternoff; Warren	3:42
3.	"Oceans" (featuring Liu Bei)	Wisternoff; Warren; Richard Walters	5:00
4.	"Lullaby Horizon"	Wisternoff; Warren	5:13
5.	"The Call" (featuring Doe Paoro)	Wisternoff; Warren; Sonia Kreitzer	4:26
6.	"Slam"	Wisternoff; Warren	6:04
7.	"We Move in the Dark" (featuring Hendrik Burkhard)	Wisternoff; Warren; Hendrik Burkhard	4:54
8.	"Diamond Dust"	Wisternoff; Warren	4:27
9.	"A Sheltered Place"	Wisternoff; Warren	5:35
10.	"Closer" (featuring Krister Linder)	Wisternoff; Warren; Krister Linder	4:53
11.	"Tuesday Maybe"	Wisternoff; Warren	8:11
Total length:			57:59

Tuesday Maybe (Remixed)
No.	Title	Length
1.	"Tuesday Maybe" (Modd Extended Mix)	7:21
2.	"Lullaby Horizon" (Ben Bohmer Extended Mix)	6:31
3.	"Tuesday Maybe" (Guy J Extended Mix)	9:22
4.	"Set My Mind" (Luttrell Remix)	5:13
5.	"Tuesday Maybe" (Atish Extended Mix)	6:39
6.	"A Sheltered Place" (Phaeleh Extended Mix)	5:51
7.	"Tuesday Maybe" (I:Cube's Sunrise Remix)	7:10
8.	"Set My Mind" (Brassica Remix)	5:40
9.	"Tuesday Maybe" (Amateur Dance Remix)	10:32
10.	"Set My Mind" (Maxxi Soundsystem Remix)	7:14
Total length:		63:12

== Personnel ==
Way Out West

- Jody Wisternoff – keyboards, synths, samples, programming, writing
- Nick Warren – engineering, mixing, writing

Featured artists

- Eliza Noble – vocals, writing (track 1)
- Jennifer Skillman – vocals, writing (track 1)
- Richard Walters – vocals, writing (track 3)
- Sonia Kreitzer – vocals, writing (track 5)
- Hendrik Burkhard – vocals, writing (track 7)
- Krister Linder – vocals, writing (track 10)

== Sunday Maybe ==
Sunday Maybe

EP by Way Out West
- Released: 20 April 2018
- Recorded: 2017–18
- Genre: Electronica; chill-out
- Label: Anjunabeats

Way Out West EP chronology
UB Devoid (2000)	Sunday Maybe (2018)

Singles from Sunday Maybe
- 1. "Sunday Maybe" Released: 3 April 2018

On 3 April 2018, Way Out West announced an extended play (EP) titled Sunday Maybe; comprising five chill-out mixes of tracks from Tuesday Maybe. The EP was released on Anjunadeep, on 20 April 2018. Its release was supported by its titular single, "Sunday Maybe", on 3 April 2018.

=== Track listing ===
Digital download
No.	Title	Writer(s)	Length
1.	"Oceans (Sunday Maybe Mix)" (featuring Liu Bei)	Wisternoff; Warren; Walters	3:53
2.	"Sunday Maybe"	Wisternoff; Warren	5:30
3.	"Closer (Sunday Maybe Mix)" (featuring Krister Linder)	Wisternoff; Warren; Linder	4:28
4.	"Lullaby Horizon (Sunday Maybe Mix)"	Wisternoff; Warren	4:19
5.	"We Move in the Dark (Sunday Maybe Mix)" (featuring Hendrik Burkhard)	Wisternoff; Warren; Burkhard	7:34

== Charts ==
Chart	Peak position
UK Dance Chart (OCC)	7

== Release history ==
Tuesday Maybe

Country	Date	Format	Label
Worldwide	16 June 2017	Digital download	Anjunadeep
Worldwide	16 June 2017	CD	Anjunadeep
Worldwide	20 April 2018	Vinyl	Anjunadeep

Sunday Maybe

Country	Date	Format	Label
Worldwide	20 April 2018	Digital download	Anjunadeep
Worldwide	20 April 2018	Vinyl	Anjunadeep
