= Whatever (Green Velvet album) =

Studio album by Green Velvet
- Released: November 16, 2001
- Genre: Techno; house
- Length: 49:53
- Label: Relief Records
- Producer: Green Velvet

Green Velvet chronology
Green Velvet (2000)	Whatever (2001)	Walk in Love (2005)

Whatever is the second studio album by Green Velvet. It was originally released on Relief Records in 2001.

== Critical reception ==
Professional ratings
Aggregate scores
Source	Rating
Metacritic	80/100
Review scores
Source	Rating
AllMusic	3/5 stars
Pitchfork	7.0/10
The New Rolling Stone Album Guide	3.5/5 stars

At Metacritic, which assigns a weighted average score out of 100 to reviews from mainstream critics, the album received an average score of 80, based on 6 reviews, indicating "generally favorable reviews".

== Track listing ==
All tracks are written by Green Velvet

Original edition (2001)
No.	Title	Length
1.	"Genedefekt"	3:30
2.	"La La Land"	5:01
3.	"Stranj"	4:52
4.	"When?"	5:34
5.	"Sleepwalking"	4:52
6.	"Stop Lyin'"	4:38
7.	"Minimum Rage"	7:05
8.	"GAT (The Great American Tragedy)"	3:06
9.	"Waitin' 4 the Day 2 End"	3:26
10.	"Dank"	7:49

Reissue edition (2001)
No.	Title	Length
1.	"La La Land"	5:01
2.	"Genedefekt"	3:30
3.	"Sleepwalking"	4:52
4.	"Why Try"	4:35
5.	"Waitin' 4 the Day 2 End"	3:26
6.	"Stop Lyin'"	4:38
7.	"GAT (The Great American Tragedy)"	3:06
8.	"Stranj"	4:52
9.	"When?"	5:34
10.	"Minimum Rage"	7:05
11.	"Dank"	2:46

Australian edition (2002)
No.	Title	Length
1.	"Genedefekt"	3:30
2.	"La La Land"	5:01
3.	"Sleepwalking"	4:52
4.	"Why Try"	4:35
5.	"Waitin' 4 the Day 2 End"	3:26
6.	"Stop Lyin'"	4:38
7.	"GAT (The Great American Tragedy)"	3:06
8.	"Stranj"	4:52
9.	"When?"	5:34
10.	"Minimum Rage"	7:05
11.	"Dank"	2:46

Australian edition (2002): bonus disc
No.	Title	Length
1.	"La La Land (Poxy Music vs Kid Kenobi Remix)"	8:49
2.	"La La Land (Biz E Reshuffle)"	4:50
3.	"La La Land (Futureshock Club Mix)"	7:48
4.	"La La Land (Par-T-One Mix)"	7:36
5.	"La La Land (Zzino vs Filterheadz Mix)"	7:44
6.	"La La Land (Dave Clarke Remix)"	5:36
7.	"Genedefekt (Cajmere Mix)"	6:27
8.	"Genedefekt (Geo Vogt Mix)"	6:31

== Personnel ==
Credits adapted from the original CD edition's liner notes.

- Green Velvet – vocals, performance, production, artwork, design
- Curan Stone – additional background vocals (2, 9)
- Walter Phillips – additional background vocals (2, 10)
- Hugo Moya – additional background vocals (10)
- Christopher Nazuka – additional background vocals (10)
- Larry Sturm – engineering
- Vandy Christie – engineering
- Bryon Rickerson – engineering assistance
- Chris Morales – engineering assistance
- Lane Wintz – engineering assistance
- Collin Jordan – mastering
- Brendan J. Gleeson – artwork, design
- Rob Pivato – photography
- Karen Chesley – photography
- Michael Voltattorni – photography

== Charts ==
Chart (2001)	Peak position
Belgian Albums (Ultratop Flanders)	33
