= Jody Wisternoff =

British musician (born 1973)

- Born: Joseph Wisternoff; 25 November 1973 (age 52)
- Origin: Bristol, England
- Genre: Electronic
- Occupations: DJ; record producer; remixer
- Instrument: Digital audio workstation
- Years active: 1988–present
- Labels: Anjunadeep, Hope, Distinct'ive
- Member of: Way Out West
- Website: soundcloud.com/jodywisternoff

Joseph Wisternoff (born 25 November 1973) is an English electronic music producer and DJ.

He is best known as one half of the electronic music duo Way Out West, and also as a solo producer of dance music spanning early 1990s hardcore to deep house.

== Biography ==
Wisternoff's first break came in the late 1980s as one half of the duo Tru Funk Posse (with brother Sam Wisternoff) when Bristol-based producers Smith & Mighty opened up their studio to them. Their tracks were playlisted by DJ Tim Westwood and the brothers appeared in The Face magazine.

In the early 1990s, Wisternoff DJ'd at clubs such as Universe and Fantasia and produced tracks with DJ Die (now of Reprazent fame) under the name Sub Love, along with singer and songwriter Sue Brice (Coco Star), the vocalist of Fragma's Toca's Miracle.

Wisternoff met fellow DJ Nick Warren in a Bristol record shop, which led to the birth of the progressive house act Way Out West. Fusing the dub sounds of Bristol with club beats, the duo saw great success in the mid to late '90s with tracks like "The Gift" and "Ajare", and their eponymous debut album Way Out West. Way Out West continues to the present day, having released their fifth studio album Tuesday Maybe in 2017.

In the mid-to late-1990s, Wisternoff was a resident DJ at Temptation, a leading Friday night techno and jungle club night at Bristol's Lakota nightclub, which was promoted by Bristol-based producer Leon Alexander of Hope Recordings. In 1997, he released his first mix album, The Silver Planet Collection Volume 1, followed by the well-received "Way Out There – A Progressive DJ Mix" in 2001.

Wisternoff also has an extensive solo remix back catalogue for artists such as Leama & Moor, Moussa Clarke, Ikon, Coalesced, Dana Bergquist & Peder G, and Andrew Bennett & Rico Soarez. More recently, Wisternoff has been producing solo 1980s-inspired electro house tracks, with five singles released thus far: "Cold Drink, Hot Girl," "Nostalgia," "Starstrings," "Welcome to Your Life," and "Lassoo / No Longer Strangers."

Wisternoff's debut solo album, Trails We Blaze, was released on 28 May 2012 on the Anjunadeep record label. The first single from the album, "How You Make Me Smile" (featuring vocals from Pete Josef), was released two weeks prior to the full album release, on 15 May 2012. It was accompanied by an official video capturing the uplifting essence of the track. The second single from the album, "Just One More," was released on 6 August, which once again featured vocals from Pete Josef.

== Discography ==
=== Solo releases ===
==== Studio albums ====
- Trails We Blaze (2012)
- Nightwhisper (2020)
- Welcome to My World (2024)

==== Mix albums ====
- Way Out There: A Progressive DJ Mix (2001)
- Anjunadeep 05 (2013)
- Anjunadeep 06 (2014)
- Anjunadeep 07 (2015)
- Anjunadeep 08 (2016)
- Anjunadeep 09 (2017)
- Anjunadeep 10 (2019)
- Anjunadeep 11 (2020)
- Anjunadeep 12 (2021)
- Anjunadeep 13 (2022)
- Anjunadeep 14 (2023)
- Anjunadeep 15 (2024)
- Anjunadeep 16 (2026)

==== Singles ====
- "Cold Drink, Hot Girl" – 2006 (Distinct'ive)
- "Nostalgia" - 2006 - (In Charge)
- "Starstrings" - 2007 - (Dirty Soul)
- "Welcome to Your Life" - December 2009 - (Dirty Soul)
- "Lassoo" - February 2009 - (Anjunadeep)
- "Vintage / Shivver" - September 2011 (Anjunadeep)
- "How You Make Me Smile" - May 2012 (Anjunadeep)
- "Just One More" - August 2012 (Anjunadeep)
- "Paramour" - November 2014 (Anjunadeep)
- "The Bridge" - May 2015 (Anjunadeep)
- "For All Time" (featuring Hendrik Burkhard) - January 2018 (Anjunadeep)
- "Emochine" - March 2020 (Anjunadeep)
- "Story of Light" - April 2020 (Anjunadeep)
- "Sweetest Thing" - November 2024 (Anjunadeep)

=== Solo remixes ===
- 2000: Poseidon - "Supertransonic" (Jody 'Way Out West' mix)
- 2006: Leama & Moor - "Distance Between Us" (Jody Wisternoff Mix)
- 2007: Andrew Bennett & Rico Soarez - "Light of Hope" (Jody Wisternoff Remix)
- 2007: Moussa Clarke featuring Fisher - "Love Key" (Jody Wisternoff Mix)
- 2007: Cerf, Mitiska, and Jaren - "Me and U" (Jody Wisternoff Vocal Remix)
- 2007: IKON - "Signs" (Jody Wisternoff Remix)
- 2008: Coalesced - "Cortina" (Jody Wisternoff Remix)
- 2008: Orkidea & David West - "Metaverse" (Jody Wisternoff Remix)
- 2008: Chymera - "Parelo" (Jody Wisternoff Mix)
- 2008: Astral Tiger - "Miami Nice" (Jody Wisternoff Remix)
- 2009: Andrelli & Blue - "Transparent" (Jody Wisternoff Remix Edit)
- 2012: Above & Beyond - "Alchemy" (Jody Wisternoff Remix)
- 2016: Chicane - "Saltwater" (Jody Wisternoff Remix)
- 2017: Xinobi - "Far Away Place" (Jody Wisternoff & James Grant Remix)
- 2018: All Hail the Silence - "Diamonds in the Snow" (Jody Wisternoff Remix)

=== With Way Out West ===
==== Studio albums ====
- Way Out West - 1997 (Deconstruction)
- Intensify - 2001 (Distinct'ive)
- Don't Look Now - 2004 (Distinct'ive)
- We Love Machine - 2009 (Hope)
- Tuesday Maybe - 2017 (Anjunadeep)
