= La La Land (Green Velvet song) =

Single by Green Velvet

from the album Whatever
- Released: 2001
- Genre: Electroclash
- Length: 5:19
- Label: Relief Records
- Songwriter: Green Velvet
- Producer: Green Velvet

"La La Land" is a song by Green Velvet, released as a single in 2001 on Relief Records. It is from Green Velvet's second studio album, Whatever. The song peaked at number 12 on the Billboard Dance Club Songs chart.

== Track listings ==
2001 original edition vinyl (Relief Records)
No.	Title	Length
1.	"La La Land (12" version)"	5:19
2.	"La La Land (Geo Vogt remix)"	5:11

2001 Belgian edition CD (Music Man Records)
No.	Title	Length
1.	"La La Land (radio edit)"	3:23
2.	"La La Land (extended mix)"	5:19

2001 French edition CD (Hot Tracks)
No.	Title	Length
1.	"La La Land (radio edit)"	3:23
2.	"La La Land (Dave Clarke mix)"	5:33

2001 Australian edition CD (Hussle Recordings)
No.	Title	Length
1.	"La La Land (radio edit)"	3:23
2.	"La La Land (original 12" version)"	5:19
3.	"La La Land (Future Shock club mix)"	7:47
4.	"La La Land (Zzino vs. Filterheadz mix)"	7:44
5.	"La La Land (Dave Clarke remix)"	5:33

2001 German edition CD (Superstar Recordings)
No.	Title	Length
1.	"La La Land (radio edit)"	3:23
2.	"La La Land (Dave Clarke radio edit)"	3:40
3.	"La La Land (extended mix)"	5:19
4.	"La La Land (Dave Clarke mix)"	5:33
5.	"La La Land (Thomas Krome mix)"	6:42
6.	"La La Land (Zzino vs. Filterheadz mix)"	7:44
7.	"La La Land (instrumental)"	3:34

2002 Swedish edition CD (Foundation)
No.	Title	Length
1.	"La La Land (radio edit)"	3:23
2.	"La La Land (extended mix)"	5:19
3.	"La La Land (Dave Clarke remix)"	5:33
4.	"La La Land (FK dub)"	9:35
5.	"La La Land (Zzino vs. Filterheadz remix)"	7:44
6.	"La La Land (Geo Vogt mix)"	5:11
7.	"La La Land (Dave Clarke radio cut)"	3:40

2019 Spanish edition digital (MindCoded Productions)
No.	Title	Length
1.	"La La Land (MindCoded remix)"	7:21

== Charts ==
Chart (2001–2002)	Peak position
Belgium (Ultratop 50 Flanders)	22
Germany (GfK)	48
UK Singles (Official Charts)	29
UK Dance (Official Charts)	1
US Dance Club Songs (Billboard)	12
