= Way Out West (duo) =

English electronic music duo

- Also known as: Echo; Sub-Version 3
- Origin: Bristol, England
- Genres: Electronic; trip hop; breakbeat; house; progressive house; big beat; Progressive Breaks
- Years active: 1992–present
- Labels: Deconstruction Records; Distinct'ive Records; Anjunadeep
- Members: Jody Wisternoff; Nick Warren
- Past members: Emma Everett
- Website: www.wayoutwestmusic.co.uk

Way Out West are an English electronic music duo comprising Jody Wisternoff and Nick Warren. Originating in Bristol, England, they rose to fame in the 1990s with their UK-charting singles "The Gift" and "Ajare", and their debut studio album Way Out West was released in 1997 to critical and commercial success. Their 2001 follow-up, Intensify, also garnered chart success, along with its singles "The Fall", "Intensify" and "Mindcircus", the latter of which reached number one on the UK Dance Chart.

Way Out West temporarily became a trio in 2004 with the addition of singer Omi (Emma Everett) for their third studio album, Don't Look Now. In 2009, their fourth album We Love Machine was released, and after a near eight-year hiatus, they released their fifth album Tuesday Maybe in 2017.

Additionally, they are known for their remixes for artists such as Sasha, Reel 2 Real, Paul van Dyk, Orbital, BT and Tiësto. They have produced and performed together for over twenty five years, and have both had success as solo musicians and DJs respectively.

== History ==
=== 1992–97: Way Out West ===
In the early 1990s, the duo met in a record store that Nick Warren was working in, and discovered their similar direction in music. They then initially produced music under the names Sub-Version 3 and Echo while also releasing remixes as Way Out West, as a side-project. Following the success of their remixes, Way Out West became their main project and the duo signed a deal with Deconstruction Records.

Way Out West began releasing singles in 1994, including "Shoot", "Montana", and "Ajare". "Ajare" became a club hit, initially peaking at No. 52 in the UK Dance Chart that year. In 1996, the duo released another two singles: "Domination", and the UK Top 15 hit, "The Gift" (which sampled Joanna Law's cover version of "The First Time Ever I Saw Your Face"). "The Gift" would later be used for the title theme of the MTV television show True Life.

On 1 September 1997, the duo released their eponymous debut studio album, Way Out West. The album included most of their previous singles, and also spawned the singles "Blue" (a reinterpretation of the theme from the film Withnail and I), and a 1997 re-release of "Ajare", which achieved greater success than the original, charting at position No. 36 in the UK.

=== 2000–02: Intensify ===
On 27 November 2000, Way Out West released their single, "The Fall", (which sampled Coldcut's cover of "Autumn Leaves") through BMG; the former parent company of the group's previous label Deconstruction (defunct in 1998). "The Fall" peaked at No. 61 on the UK Singles Chart and was followed by the group's final release on BMG, the UB Devoid EP. Two of the EP's tracks would later go on to feature on their then-upcoming album.

On 20 August 2001, Way Out West released their second studio album, Intensify. The album's release was marked by a move from the defunct Deconstruction Records to Distinctive Records, and a change in their sound, from club instrumentals and sampled vocals to a mixture of club tracks and original songs. Singles from the album included "The Fall", "Mindcircus" (which reached number 1 in the UK Dance Chart), and the club hit "Intensify". "Activity" from this release also appeared in the 2001 PlayStation 2 game Kinetica and the Paul van Dyk album The Politics of Dancing.

=== 2003–04: Don't Look Now ===
In 2003, the duo released the song "Killa", which was later remixed by Orkidea and gained club popularity. "Killa" was also featured the 2005 video game Juiced.

In 2004, Way Out West became a trio with the addition of vocalist Omi (Emma Everett), the group's only ever third member.

Later that year, the group then released their third studio album, Don't Look Now. Excluding "Killa", the album spawned two singles: "Anything but You" (featured in the video game Tiger Woods PGA Tour 07) and "Don't Forget Me" (featured in season two of Grey's Anatomy). Other songs from the album include "Melt" (appeared in The O.C. as well as the season 2 episode "Bones of Contention" for the series Numb3rs), and "Just Like a Man" (appeared on season 3, episode 8 of CSI: Miami).

=== 2008–10: We Love Machine ===
In 2008, Way Out West contributed the song "Evelina" to the Survival International charity album, Songs for Survival.

In 2009, Way Out West returned as a duo and moved to the label Hope Recordings, of which Nick Warren continues to be the A&R manager. The duo's fourth album, We Love Machine, was released on 5 October 2009. The song "Only Love" with Jonathan Mendelsohn performing vocals (their first collaboration with a male vocalist) was the first single from the album, released on 31 August 2009, followed by "Future Perfect" on 7 December. The album was released on Hope Recordings and Armada Music.

In April 2010, Deconstruction Records re-released "The Gift" together with remixes by Logistics, Gui Boratto, Tek-One and Michael Woods; Way Out West themselves also recorded a new remix of the track.

Later that year, We Love Machine – The Remixes was released via Hope Recordings. The release featured remixes of tracks from We Love Machine by producers such as Scuba, Henry Saiz, Jaytech and D. Ramirez.

=== 2017–present: Tuesday Maybe ===
In April 2017, Way Out West announced their fifth studio album Tuesday Maybe, with the release of three web-exclusive singles: "Oceans" (featuring Liu Bei), "The Call" (featuring Doe Paoro) and "Slam". The album also features their 2016 singles "Tuesday Maybe" and "Set My Mind". The album was released on 16 June 2017 through Anjunadeep.

In January 2018, Wisternoff hosted a Reddit AMA and hinted at upcoming work from Way Out West, claiming "Me and Nick are working on new material together". He also announced a then upcoming remix album for Tuesday Maybe. On 2 February 2018, the remix album, Tuesday Maybe (Remixed), was released on digital download stores.

In 2018, Way Out West announced a five track EP comprising chill-out remixes of songs from Tuesday Maybe, titled Sunday Maybe. The EP's release was supported by the single "Sunday Maybe" on 3 April 2018, and was released on 20 April, on Anjunadeep.

== Members ==
- Jody Wisternoff - production, mixing, keyboards, synths, samples, programming (1992–present)
- Nick Warren - production, mixing, engineering (1992–present)

=== Former members ===
- Emma Everett (Omi) - lead vocals (2004)

== Live performances ==
In support of their third studio album Don't Look Now in 2004, the duo expanded from their DJ roots to a full-fledged touring collective, playing at festivals such as Glastonbury 2004, Creamfields, and The Glade. The band had supported Faithless on their Australian tour in October 2004, and embarked on their own tour in the US in May and November 2004.

In September 2017, Way Out West announced a UK concert tour to promote the release of Tuesday Maybe through their social media. The tour commenced in February 2018 and concluded in March the same year.

=== 2001–03, 2016 ===
- Jody Wisternoff - keyboards, synths, samples, programming
- Nick Warren - keyboards, engineering
- Adam Pickard (The Orb, The String Cheese Incident) - drums, electronic percussion

=== 2004 ===
- Jody Wisternoff - keyboards, synths, samples, programming
- Nick Warren - keyboards, engineering
- Omi (Emma Everett) - vocals
- George Vjestica (Groove Armada, Nick Cave and the Bad Seeds) - guitars
- Joe Allen (Alison Moyet, Roni Size) - bass
- Damon Reece (Massive Attack, The Orb, Goldfrapp, Spiritualized, Echo & the Bunnymen, Lupine Howl. - drums, electronic percussion

=== 2017–present ===
- Jody Wisternoff - keyboards, synths, samples, programming
- Nick Warren - engineering, electronic percussion

== Discography ==
Studio albums

- Way Out West (1997)
- Intensify (2001)
- Don't Look Now (2004)
- We Love Machine (2009)
- Tuesday Maybe (2017)
