= Don't Look Now (album) =

Studio album by Way Out West
- Released: 5 October 2004
- Genre: Electronic; trip hop; progressive house; big beat
- Length: 76:23
- Label: Distinct'ive Records
- Producer: Jody Wisternoff; Nick Warren

Way Out West chronology
Intensify (2001)	Don't Look Now (2004)	We Love Machine (2009)

Singles from Don't Look Now
- 1. "Anything but You" Released: 21 June 2004; 2. "Don't Forget Me" Released: 14 March 2005; 3. "Killa" Released: 15 October 2005

Professional ratings
Review scores
Source	Rating
AllMusic	2.5/5 stars
Resident Advisor	4.5/5

Don't Look Now is the third studio album by English electronic music group Way Out West. It was released on 5 October 2004 on Distinct'ive Records. It is the only studio album by Way Out West as a trio, with the addition of singer Omi (Emma Everett). The album peaked at number 137 on the UK Albums Chart on release.

== Background ==
Don't Look Now is Way Out West's second and final album release on Distinct'ive Records. The album's lead single, "Anything but You", was released on 21 June 2004 and peaked at 97 on the UK Singles Chart that year. This was followed by the album's release later that year, on 5 October 2004. In 2005, after the album's release, two more singles were released; "Don't Forget Me" on 14 March 2005 (peaked at 246 on the UK Singles Chart), and "Killa" on 15 October 2005 (released on Solaris Recordings and supported by a remix from Orkidea). Ally Kennen, vocalist on "Intensify" from Intensify, reprised her role as vocalist for "Just Like a Man".

The song "Absinthe Dreams" samples "Hushaby Mountain" from Chitty Chitty Bang Bang, and the song "Everyday" samples "Tiergarten" by Tangerine Dream, from Le Parc.

== Critical reception ==
Upon release, Don't Look Now was met with mixed to positive reviews from critics. John Bush from Allmusic described the album negatively, claiming "[the album] isn't impressive", summarising it as "an admitted grab for pop-chart fame", and rated it 2.5 stars out of 5. However, Antonella Sirec from Resident Advisor wrote a positive review, summarising the album as "a pleasurable and sumptuous experience", describing it as "portraying an aspect of electronic dance music as it should be heard", and rated it 4.5 out of 5.

== Track listing ==
No.	Title	Writer(s)	Length
1.	"Anything but You"	Jody Wisternoff; Nick Warren; Emma Everett	5:41
2.	"Don't Forget Me"	Wisternoff; Warren; Everett	5:14
3.	"Everyday"	Wisternoff; Warren	5:55
4.	"Apollo"	Wisternoff; Warren	8:25
5.	"Chasing Rainbows"	Wisternoff; Warren	5:39
6.	"Fear"	Wisternoff; Warren; Everett	7:38
7.	"Coming Home"	Wisternoff; Warren	5:03
8.	"Just Like a Man"	Wisternoff; Warren; Ally Kennen	5:26
9.	"Killa"	Wisternoff; Warren	10:58
10.	"Northern Lights"	Wisternoff; Warren; Ulrich Schnauss	7:46
11.	"Melt"	Wisternoff; Warren; Everett	5:27
12.	"Absinthe Dreams"	Wisternoff; Warren	3:10
Total length:			76:23

Bonus mix CD
No.	Title	Artist(s)	Length
1.	"Walk"	Deaf Center	0:25
2.	"Four Squares"	Adam Johnson	3:11
3.	"Stinger"	Agent 001	2:30
4.	"Meeting Dave Dish" / "Rainbows In the Sky" (Natural High Movement Mix)	Martin Buttrich / The Hypnotist	4:12
5.	"Lost"	Paul Hughes	4:12
6.	"Out of Area" (Habersham & Numinous Mix)	Blue Room Project	6:51
7.	"Pulse of Life"	Way Out West	5:52
8.	"Surrender" (Your Love Breaks Mix)	Palava	6:51
9.	"Implantat"	2 Dollar Egg	1:09
10.	"Seaside Floater"	Introvert	8:44
11.	"Gold Is Your Metal" (Paper Faces Mix)	Themroc	4:51
12.	"Carrier"	David West	5:39
13.	"The Awakening"	Kaito	4:09
14.	"Loveworld" (Ulrich Schnauss Instrumental Mix)	HRK	5:22

== Personnel ==
Way Out West

- Jody Wisternoff – production, keyboards, synths, samples, drum programming (all tracks), percussion (Fear)
- Nick Warren – production, engineering, mixing (all tracks)
- Emma Everett (Omi) – vocals ("Anything but You", "Don't Forget Me", "Fear", "Melt")

Additional personnel

- Adam Pickard – drums, drum programming (all except track 6 & 12)
- Damon Reece - drums ("Fear")
- Marcus Dahl – guitars ("Anything but You", "Don't Forget Me")
- Ally Keenan – vocals ("Just Like a Man")
- Steven Robshaw – guitars, string arrangements ("Just Like a Man")
- Keeling Lee – additional guitars ("Northern Lights")

== In popular culture ==
- The song "Killa" was featured in the 2005 video game Juiced.
- "Anything But You" was featured in the video game Tiger Woods PGA Tour 07.
- "Don't Forget Me" was featured in season two of Grey's Anatomy.
- "Melt" appeared in The O.C. and the season 2 episode "Bones of Contention" from the series Numb3rs.
- "Just Like a Man" appeared on season 3, episode 8 of CSI: Miami.
- An abbreviated version of "Pulse of Life" appeared on the soundtrack of the 2005 futuristic racing video game Wipeout Pure.

== Charts ==
Chart	Peak position
UK Albums Chart (OCC)	137
