= We Love Machine =

2009 studio album by Way Out West

Studio album by Way Out West
- Released: 21 September 2009
- Genres: Electronic; progressive house; ambient
- Labels: Hope Recordings (UK); 405 Recordings (Australia); Universal Records (Russia and Greece); Armada Music (Netherlands)
- Producers: Jody Wisternoff; Nick Warren

Way Out West chronology
Don't Look Now (2004)	We Love Machine (2009)	Tuesday Maybe (2017)

Singles from We Love Machine
- 1. "Only Love" Released: 7 September 2009; 2. "Future Perfect" Released: 10 November 2009; 3. "Surrender" Released: 21 December 2010

Professional ratings
Review scores
Source	Rating
AllMusic	3/5 stars
Resident Advisor	4/5 stars

We Love Machine is the fourth studio album by English electronic music duo Way Out West, released on 21 September 2009 by Hope Recordings. The album is considered the group's move away from the trip hop genre and a further venture into their progressive house style, and gathered generally positive reviews. It features the lead single and EP "Only Love", and web exclusive release, "Future Perfect". On 19 April 2010, a remix album was released, titled We Love Machine – The Remixes.

== Release ==
We Love Machine was preceded with the release of its lead single "Only Love", its music video and its EP of the same name on Hope Recordings on 7 September 2009 to promote the then upcoming album. After the album's release, a second single was released titled "Future Perfect" on Hope Recordings, released web-exclusively.

The album was released by Hope Recordings on 21 September 2009 in the UK. It was then later released on 405 Recordings in Australia, on Universal Records in Greece and Russia, Armada Digital in the Netherlands, High Note Recordings in Taiwan, and Love Da Records in Hong Kong.

== Track listing ==
All tracks are written by Jody Wisternoff and Nick Warren.

No.	Title	Length
1.	"We Love Machine"	5:57
2.	"One Bright Night"	6:04
3.	"Only Love"	6:53
4.	"Bodymotion"	6:32
5.	"Pleasure Control"	6:32
6.	"Future Perfect"	6:24
7.	"Survival"	5:35
8.	"Ultraviolet"	7:52
9.	"Tales Of The Rabid Monks"	5:52
10.	"Surrender"	6:37
11.	"The Doors Are Where The Windows Should Be"	3:51
12.	"Tierra Del Fuego"	3:00

Digital bonus track
No.	Title	Length
13.	"Sparkle"	5:57

== We Love Machine – The Remixes ==
We Love Machine – The Remixes

Remix album by Way Out West
- Released: 19 April 2010
- Recorded: 2009–10
- Genre: Electronica
- Labels: Hope Recordings; TME (Russia); Armada (Netherlands)
- Producers: Jody Wisternoff, Nick Warren

Way Out West compilation chronology
We Love Machine – The Remixes (2010)	Tuesday Maybe (Remixed) (2018)

Singles from We Love Machine – The Remixes
- 1. "The Gift (Way Out West's 2010 Mix)" Released: 15 March 2010

Professional ratings
Review scores
Source	Rating
AllMusic	3/5 stars

On 19 April 2010, Way Out West released a remix album titled We Love Machine – The Remixes through Hope Recordings. It is composed of remixes from We Love Machine, as the title suggests, with the exception of two instrumental mixes and the final track; Way Out West's remix of their 1996 hit single "The Gift".

=== Track listing ===
All tracks are written by Jody Wisternoff and Nick Warren except where noted.

Digital download
No.	Title	Length
1.	"Surrender" (Sommerstad Remix)	6:03
2.	"Surrender" (Eelke Kelijn Remix)	7:21
3.	"Bodymotion" (Joen Lebens Remix)	7:57
4.	"We Love Machine" (Jaytech Remix)	7:16
5.	"Future Perfect" (Ruben De Ronde Remix)	7:34
6.	"Bodymotion" (Seb Dhajje Remix)	9:49
7.	"Surrender" (Tom Glass Remix)	7:36
8.	"Tales Of The Rabid Monks" (Envotion Remix)	6:19
9.	"Tierra Del Fuego" (Paul Keeley 4th Movement Mix)	8:07
10.	"Bodymotion" (D. Ramirez Instrumental Remix)	7:52
11.	"Bodymotion" (D. Ramirez Remix)	7:52
12.	"Bodymotion" (Instrumental)	6:32
13.	"One Bright Night" (Scuba's Broken Window Dub)	6:00
14.	"One Bright Night" (Instrumental)	6:02
15.	"Surrender" (Henry Saiz Remix)	9:07
16.	"UltraViolet" (Guy J Remix)	8:04
17.	"The Doors Are Where The Windows Should Be" (Michael Cassette Remix)	7:02
18.	"The Gift" (Way Out West's 2010 Mix)	7:54

==== CD ====
Disc 1
No.	Title	Length
1.	"Surrender" (Sommerstad Remix)	6:03
2.	"Surrender" (Eelke Kelijn Remix)	7:21
3.	"Bodymotion" (Joen Lebens Remix)	7:57
4.	"We Love Machine" (Jaytech Remix)	7:16
5.	"Future Perfect" (Ruben De Ronde Remix)	7:34
6.	"Bodymotion" (Seb Dhajje Remix)	9:49
7.	"Surrender" (Tom Glass Remix)	7:36
8.	"Tales Of The Rabid Monks" (Envotion Remix)	6:19
9.	"Tierra Del Fuego" (Paul Keeley 4th Movement Mix)	8:07

Disc 2
No.	Title	Length
10.	"Bodymotion" (D. Ramirez Instrumental Remix)	7:52
11.	"Bodymotion" (D. Ramirez Remix)	7:52
12.	"Bodymotion" (Instrumental)	6:32
13.	"One Bright Night" (Scuba's Broken Window Dub)	6:00
14.	"One Bright Night" (Instrumental)	6:02
15.	"Surrender" (Henry Salz Remix)	9:07
16.	"UltraViolet" (Guy J Remix)	8:04
17.	"The Doors Are Where The Windows Should Be" (Michael Cassette Remix)	7:02
18.	"Spaceman" (Robert Babicz Mix)	11:16
