= Skiddle =

Primary ticket outlet based in the United Kingdom

Skiddle Ltd
- Company type: Private
- Industry: Live Entertainment
- Founded: 2001; 25 years ago
- Founders: Ben Sebborn; Richard Dyer
- Headquarters: Preston, Lancashire, UK
- Number of locations: 4 offices
- Area served: Europe
- Revenue: £158 million (2024)
- Owner: Ben Sebborn; Richard Dyer
- Number of employees: 50-150
- Website: www.skiddle.com

Skiddle Ltd is a primary ticket outlet and online events guide based in the UK, with offices in Manchester, Liverpool, London and Preston dealing with event bookings, registrations, promotion and online ticket sales.

It concentrates its core business in the three main areas of gigs, clubs and festivals, plus lifestyle events such as food and drink, sports, days out and entertainment.

The company has a gross turnover in excess of £100 million and over 70 employees.

== History ==
Skiddle was launched in May 2001 initially as a What's on Guide for Preston in Lancashire. It was incorporated as Skiddle Ltd in January 2006. In February 2014, Skiddle acquired new 5,000 sq ft (460 m^{2}) premises in Longridge to support expansion.

In August 2015, Skiddle launched an iOS app with mobile 'box office' functionality. The app works with Bluetooth printers and iZettle card-readers, allowing tickets to be purchased and printed closer to gig start times.

In November 2015, the firm announced an intern program with the University of Salford, with the aim of giving students insights into the industry and to develop journalism skills.

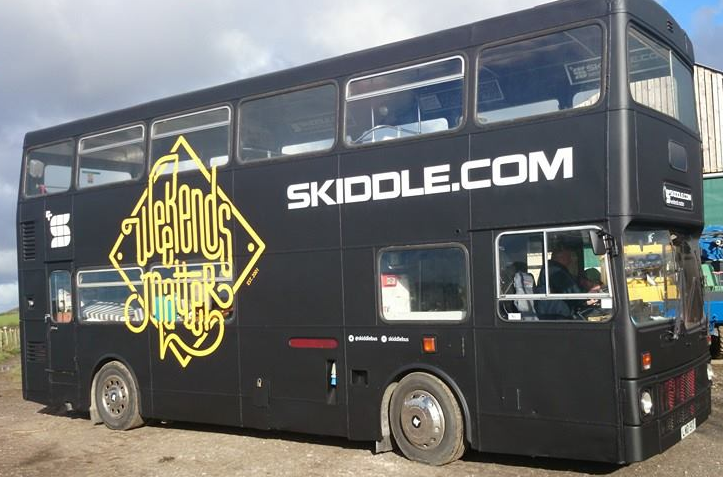
The Skiddle Bus

== Industry involvement ==
In 2013, Skiddle announced its white-label ticket shop, already in use by Mixmag, would also be powering Debenhams' Box Office. During October 2015, Skiddle was chosen as the official ticket website for the BBC Radio 1Xtra Live event in Leeds.

Skiddle has sponsored a range of festivals, tents and gigs mainly in the UK.

- In 2005, the firm sponsored its first dance tent at The Wickerman Festival.
- At the 2010 RockNess Festival, the firm introduced the SKIDDLEBUS, a multimedia broadcast bus for live coverage allowing festival-goers to upload their content. The bus is now a regular feature at UK festivals as well as being used by the BBC.
- Skiddle sponsored the Bass Music Awards in 2013, its inaugural year, and continued this sponsorship through 2015.
- In 2015, Skiddle attended the Isle of Wight Festival, Reading and Leeds Festivals and Creamfields, providing up to 10,000 pairs of 3D-printed Wellington boots to attendees.

== Charity work ==
In 2011, Skiddle announced its sponsorship of the charity Campaign Against Living Miserably (C.A.L.M). A checkout donation scheme on the Skiddle website has helped to raise money for several UK charities. A donation in 2015 for over £15,000 was presented to the Anthony Nolan trust, with previous benefactors including Macmillan and the Disasters Emergency Committee.

In 2016, Skiddle announced it would be aiming to raise £100,000 for Macmillan Cancer Support in memory of a colleague who died from cancer. This target was later increased to £300,000.

The total raised to date for charities is over £300,000.

== Awards ==
Skiddle has received a Hitwise Top 10 Award every month since 2008 and in August 2011 Skiddle was awarded the Hitwise Top 6 Award, making it one of the most viewed websites in the UK within its category.

In March 2012, Skiddle was awarded 'Online Business of The Year' by the Lancashire Business Review's "Red Rose Awards".

In February 2016, Skiddle won 'Best Ticketing Company' at the Event Production Awards in London.

In April 2017, Skiddle was awarded with two Ticketing Technology Awards, for Customer Service and Moving On Up, recognising recent innovation and focus on customer satisfaction.
