= Spacegirl and Other Favorites =

Studio album by The Brian Jonestown Massacre
- Released: November 10, 1995
- Recorded: 1993
- Genre: Rock, shoegazing
- Length: 43:55 (original); 73:07 (reissue)
- Label: Committee to Keep Music Evil

The Brian Jonestown Massacre chronology
Methodrone (1995)	Spacegirl and Other Favorites (1995)	Take It from the Man! (1996)

Professional ratings
Review scores
Source	Rating
AllMusic	2.5/5 stars

Spacegirl and Other Favorites is the second studio album by The Brian Jonestown Massacre. The album was released in November 10, 1995.

== Background ==
"Hide and Seek" was released as a single in 1994. The song "Swallowtail" was also written during these sessions, although a studio recording was not released commercially until 2001. Live versions of both these songs appear on Tepid Peppermint Wonderland: A Retrospective.

== Track listing ==
All tracks are written by The Brian Jonestown Massacre.

No.	Title	Length
1.	"Crushed" (Newcombe)	5:54
2.	"That Girl Suicide" (Newcombe)	3:37
3.	"Deep in the Devil's Eye & You" (Newcombe)	5:23
4.	"Kids Garden" (Newcombe)	7:22
5.	"When I Was Yesterday" (Newcombe)	3:57
6.	"Records" (Newcombe)	0:41
7.	"Spacegirl" (Newcombe)	11:40
8.	"Spacegirl Revisited" (Newcombe)	5:21
Total length:		43:55

2003 CD reissue bonus tracks

All songs written and composed by The Brian Jonestown Massacre.

No.	Title	Length
9.	"After the Fall" (Newcombe)	4:31
10.	"Thoughts of You" (Newcombe)	5:23
11.	"Hide and Seek" (Newcombe)	3:59
12.	"Never Ever!" (Newcombe)	6:02
13.	"Ashtray" (Newcombe)	5:13
14.	"Fire Song" (Newcombe)	4:04
Total length:		73:07

== Personnel ==
- Anton Newcombe – guitar, vocals, organ
- Jeffrey Davies – guitar
- Thravis Threlkel – guitar
- Matt Hollywood – bass
- Rick Maymi – drums
