= Lady Astronaut =

Lady Astronaut may refer to:

- First Lady Astronaut Trainees, participants in the 1960s privately-funded Woman in Space Program, commonly known as the Mercury 13
- The Lady Astronaut Universe, a 2012–2024 series of books by Mary Robinette Kowal

== See also ==
- Women in space
- List of women astronauts
