= Doe Paoro =

American singer-songwriter (born 1984)

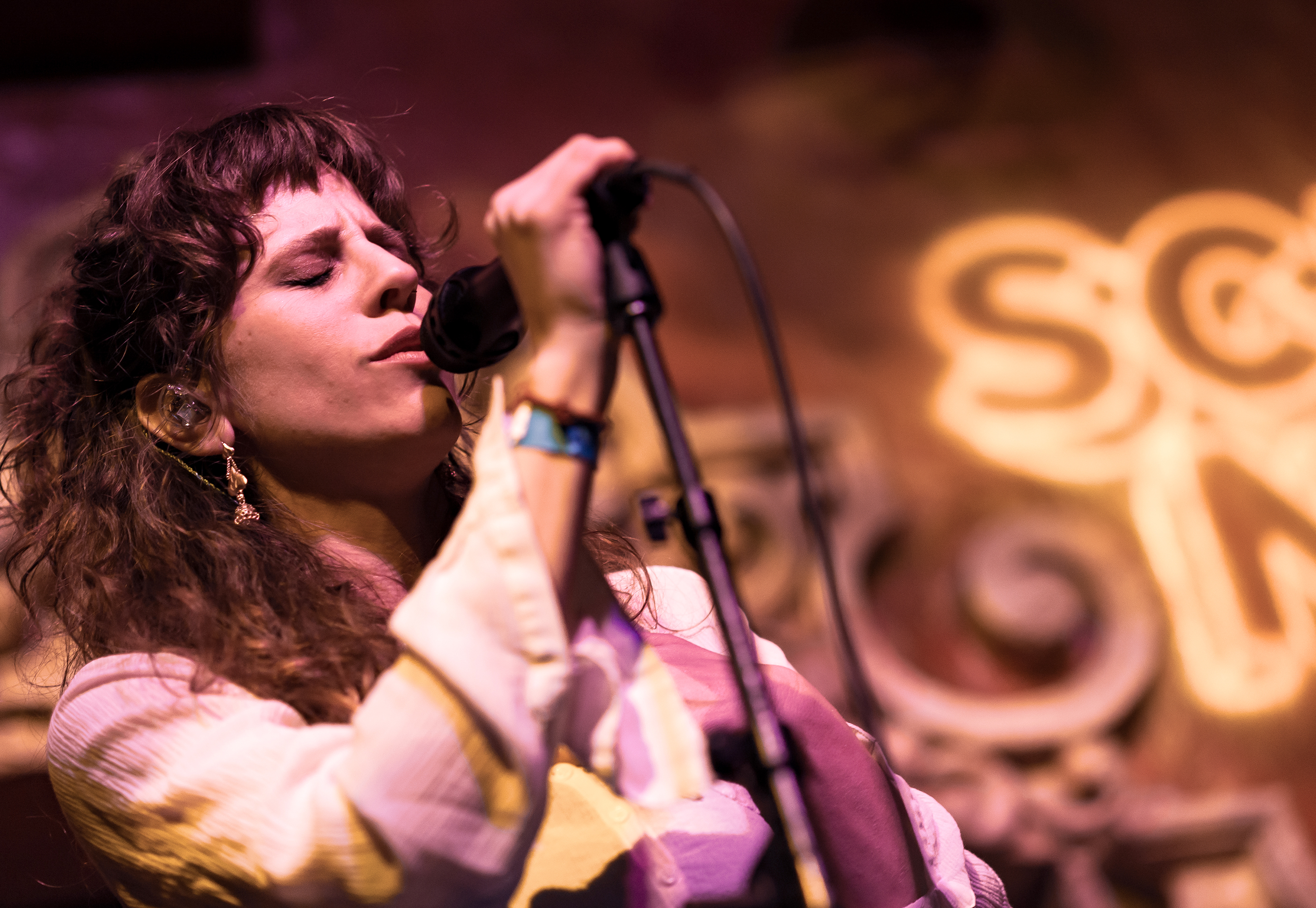
- Doe Paoro performing in 2018

Background information
- Born: Sonia Jill Kreitzer; September 19, 1984 (age 42); Syracuse, New York, United States
- Genres: Indie pop; alternative dance; alternative R&B; soul
- Years active: 2011–present
- Labels: White Iris; ANTI-
- Website: doepaoro.com

Sonia Jill Kreitzer (born September 19, 1984), known by her stage name Doe Paoro, is an American singer-songwriter based in Los Angeles, California. Her music blends elements of pop, dubstep, soul, and R&B, and bears a strong influence of Lhamo, a Tibetan folk opera tradition. Her debut EP, Slow to Love, which Paoro composed while isolated in a cabin near her hometown of Syracuse, New York, was released in February 2012. Her first full-length album, After, followed in September 2015 and received critical acclaim. She has since issued two further studio albums as well as two EPs.

== Background ==
Doe Paoro, who possesses the vocal range of a contralto, has performed at Bonnaroo, SXSW, Osheaga, and CMJ, as well as numerous venues throughout the U.S. She often opens her live performances with an a cappella Tibetan prayer, and she credits Vipassanā meditation with having a strong influence over the themes explored in her work, which include attachment, detachment, compassion, and disconnection from the human experience.

She has been compared to Fiona Apple, James Blake, Adele, and Lykke Li, among others.

== Career ==
=== Beginnings and Slow to Love ===
A self-taught pianist and singer, Doe Paoro trained in the Tibetan theatre tradition of Lhamo while traveling alone through the Himalayas. During this period, she also spent several weeks practicing silent meditation, which allowed her to reflect on the "space between silence and sound". In December 2011, she released a cover of the Baltimore synthpop band Future Islands' song "Little Dreamer". She followed it with the original singles "Can't Leave You" and "Born Whole" in January 2012. In February, she issued her debut EP, Slow to Love. She was named an artist to watch by Stereogum shortly thereafter.

=== After ===
Her first full-length album, After, was published through ANTI- in September 2015, to critical acclaim. It included the track "Hypotheticals", which was featured on season 4 of the TV series Girls. NPR's All Songs Considered listed her on their Six Musical Discoveries You Can't Miss list that year.

=== Soft Power, Living Through Collapse ===
In October 2018, Doe Paoro released her third studio album, Soft Power, which was produced by Jimmy Hogarth and features Leo Abrahams on guitar. It was recorded live to tape and is an exploration of power dynamics.

In September 2025, she issued her fourth studio album, Living Through Collapse.

== Discography ==
Studio albums

- After (2015)
- Soft Power (2018)
- Living Through Collapse (2025)

EPs

- Slow to Love (2012)
- Ink on the Walls (2014)
- Divine Surrendering (2022)

Other albums

- 432Hz Chakra Suite, Vol. 1 with Float Waves (2021)
- 30 Minute Guided Meditation (Body Scan) (2021)
- 432Hz Chakra Suite, Vol. II: Sacred Sounds with Float Waves (2022)
