= Nick Warren =

English record producer

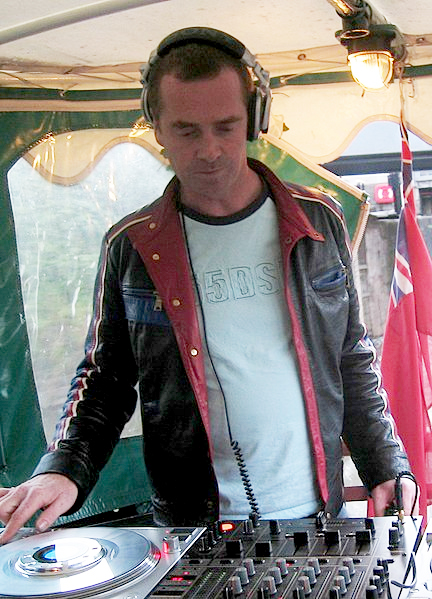
- Nick Warren in 2004

Background information
- Born: Nicholas John Warren; 24 October 1968 (age 57)
- Origin: Bristol, England
- Genres: Electronic dance, house, breakbeat, Progressive House
- Occupations: DJ; record producer; remixer
- Years active: 1988–present
- Labels: Balance Music, Global Underground, Hope Recordings, Peacefrog
- Member of: Way Out West
- Website: djnickwarren.com

Nicholas John Warren (born 24 October 1968) is an English DJ and record producer. He is best known as a member of the electronic music duo Way Out West, his record label and global live events brand, The Soundgarden, and for his albums released in the Global Underground series. He is also head of A&R for the record label Hope Recordings.

== Biography ==
In 1988, Nick Warren began DJing in Bristol, playing mainly reggae and indie music until house music became more popular in the UK. By the early 1990s, Warren had become one of the more popular DJs in Bristol, performing regularly at the superclub Vision and DJing for Massive Attack.

While working at a record store in 1994, Warren met producer Jody Wisternoff and the two decided to work together. Their first collaboration was on the track "Paradise is the Sound" which they released under the artist name Sub-Version 3. Warren describes Wisternoff as being the more technical of the two, while Warren states that he "bring[s] most of the sounds into our projects" and an understanding of what music needs in order for it to be successful at dance clubs. Their next two releases were issued under the name Echo, with Way Out West being the name of their remix project. The duo soon adopted the name for their act and signed a deal with Deconstruction Records.

In the mid 1990s, Warren began a residency at Liverpool dance club Cream. In 1997, Warren was given the opportunity to mix the second entry in the still young Global Underground series. The album, Global Underground 003: Prague, is a live set of Warren's from Prague. Although labelled as 003, this was actually only the second release on the Global Underground label. This began a relationship with Global Underground which led to Warren creating seven additional mix albums for the series, including Global Underground 008: Brazil, Global Underground 011: Budapest, Global Underground 018: Amsterdam, Global Underground 024: Reykjavík, Global Underground 028: Shanghai, Global Underground 030: Paris, and Global Underground 035: Lima. Warren stated that he feels comfortable working with Global Underground due to an underlying trust between himself and the label.

In December 2000, Way Out West was dropped by Deconstruction, which had since been bought by BMG, as the label felt that Way Out West's album would not do well commercially. Way Out West then signed a three-album contract with Distinct'ive Records, turning down offers from other labels such as Bedrock. Their first album on Distinct'ive was Intensify, which featured the singles "The Fall", "Intensify", and "Mindcircus". "The Fall" used lyrics taken from the Cole Porter song "Autumn Leaves" and "Mindcircus" features vocals written by Imogen Heap. For the next Way Out West album, Don't Look Now (2004), Warren and Wisternoff brought in vocalist Omi and drummer Damon Reece. As of early 2007, Way Out West had begun work on new material. Warren made this possible because he is now head A&R of Hope Recordings, the label in which their last single "Spaceman" was released in 2008. In 2008, Global Underground released Warren's next compilation, Global Underground 035: Lima. Before this album, Warren had sold over 110,000 compilations in the Global Underground series in the UK alone.

Way Out West's fourth album, titled "We Love Machine", was released on 6 October 2009. The song "Only Love" featuring Jonathan Mendelsohn on vocals (the album marks their first collaboration with a male vocalist) was the first single from the album, released 31 August 2009. The deluxe edition of the album on Hope Recordings is available at their own website.

In 2010, Warren released a remix of Grafiti's song Spooky Trains and a remix of General Midi's song 'Absinth'. Also in 2010, Warren released on Bedrock Recordings, with the track In Search of Silver and he began his The Soundgarden show on Frisky Radio, a bi-monthly venture in which Nick played a wide range of different sets on this popular station. The show was discontinued in 2018.

2011 marked Hope Recordings' 100th release, taken on by none other than Nick Warren himself. The track was titled 'Buenos Aires' – as Warren feels a special connection with the city, having played there on several occasions. "I am in love with the city of Buenos Aires and have the most amazing time, each and every time I go there to play. I started writing this tune after playing there last year". Hope Recordings' next release was by Tom Glass, titled 'Naive' for which Nick did his own 'Psychedelic Wheel' Remix. In November 2011, Nick released another solo single, Rumbletump, on Hernan Cattaneo's Sudbeat label.

On 25 August 2012 Warren announced via his Facebook page that he would be compiling the next Renaissance Masters series album, set for a January 2013 release. He demonstrated his excitement for the release stating "These are exciting times for electronic music with genres and styles more eclectic than ever before and with this album for the Masters series I hope to highlight some of the most breathtaking and diverse electronic music in 2012."

In 2015, Warren expanded his The Soundgarden radio shows into a global live events brand. After an initial season in Ibiza, the brand found particular initial success in the South American markets, with highlights including shows at Destino Arena, Mar Del Plata and Parque Riviera, Montevideo, Uruguay, as well as annual boat parties at Amsterdam Dance Event and Miami Music Week alongside Hernán Cattáneo's Sudbeat label.

Off the back of its success in the live arena, The Soundgarden has subsequently expanded into a respected Progressive and Melodic House record label. A&R'd exclusively by Warren, the label has released numerous EPs and singles from artists including Modd, Luka Sambe, Black 8, Nicolas Rada, and Warren himself, as well as compilations and samplers for major electronic music events such as Miami Music Week and Amsterdam Dance Event.

In 2017, Warren and Jody Wisternoff released their fifth studio album as Way Out West, Tuesday Maybe, on Anjunadeep. In 2018, the duo subsequently released an EP of extended chill-out versions of tracks from Tuesday Maybe, entitled Sunday Maybe, on Anjunadeep.

For in-studio mixing, Nick Warren uses Ableton Live, ProTools, and some Logic Pro on a Macintosh.

On 19 September 2025, Warren released his debut solo studio album Turbulence via The Soundgarden.

== Selected discography ==
Studio albums

- Turbulence (2025)

Mix albums

- 1997: Global Underground 003: Prague (Boxed)
- 1998: Global Underground 008: Brazil (Boxed)
- 1999: Back to Mine: Nick Warren (DMC Publishing)
- 1999: Global Underground 011: Budapest (Boxed)
- 2000: Global Underground 018: Amsterdam (Boxed)
- 2001: Renaissance: Revelation (Ultra Records)
- 2003: Global Underground 024: Reykjavík (Global Underground Ltd.) (Billboard Top Electronic Albums No. 25)
- 2005: Global Underground 028: Shanghai (Global Underground Ltd.) (Billboard Top Electronic Albums No. 14)
- 2007: Global Underground 030: Paris (Global Underground Ltd.) (Billboard Top Electronic Albums No. 20)
- 2008: Global Underground 035: Lima (Global Underground Ltd.)
- 2011: Balance 018 (Balance Music)
- 2013: Renaissance: The Master Series, Part 19 (Renaissance Recordings)
- 2014: Nick Warren Presents The Soundgarden (Hope Recordings)
- 2019: Balance Music presents The Soundgarden

Singles

- 2007: Nick Warren & Jimmy Van M – "One & Only" (Hope Recordings)
- 2010: Nick Warren – "In Search of Silver" (Bedrock Records)
- 2011: Nick Warren – "Buenos Aires" (Hope Recordings)
- 2011: Nick Warren – "Rumbletump" – Sudbeat
- 2013: Nick Warren – "Devil's Elbow" (Hope Recordings)
- 2013: Nick Warren – "La Fabrica" (Hope Recordings)
- 2014: Nick Warren - "Alta" (Soulfood)
- 2015: Nick Warren & Guy Mantzur – "Sad Robot" (Bedrock)
- 2017: Nick Warren & Tripswitch – "Savannah" (Sudbeat)
- 2018: Nick Warren & Nicolas Rada – "Land of Dreams" (The Soundgarden)
