= List of bands from Los Angeles =

Los Angeles has been home to many new and established music bands. Some of the bands originating from greater Los Angeles, including Orange County and the Inland Empire, include:

== 0-9 ==
- 16
- 213
- 2Cents
- 2nd II None
- 400 Blows
- 5uu's
- 78violet
- 8mm
- 98 Degrees
- 98 Mute

== A ==
- Abe Vigoda
- Above the Law
- Abysmal Dawn
- The Adored
- Against All Will
- Agent Steel
- The Aggrolites
- A.i.
- The Airborne Toxic Event
- Akwid
- Alcatrazz
- Allah-Las
- Tha Alkaholiks
- Art Alexakis
- Aimee Allen
- Alton McClain and Destiny
- Ambrosia
- Amen
- American Pearl
- Animotion
- Ken Andrews
- Angel City Chorale
- Angeles
- Angry Samoans
- Animals as Leaders
- Ankla
- Aria
- Ariel Pink's Haunted Graffiti
- Armored Saint
- Army Navy
- As Blood Runs Black
- Atban Klann
- Audioslave
- Autograph
- Autolux
- Avenged Sevenfold
- AWOLNATION

== B ==
- B2K
- Bad Religion
- Badlands
- Bags
- Bates Motel
- Bang Tango
- The Bangles
- Devendra Banhart
- The Beach Boys
- Beck
- Before the Mourning
- Beowülf
- Best Coast
- Beware of Safety
- The Big Phat Band
- Bigelf
- The Bird and the Bee
- Birtha
- Bitch
- The Black Eyed Peas
- Black Flag
- Black Label Society
- Black 'n Blue
- The Black Pine
- The Blasters
- Bleached
- Blind Melon
- Body Count
- Bryndle
- Bread
- Brides of Destruction
- Phoebe Bridgers
- Buckcherry
- Buffalo Springfield
- BulletBoys
- Buster
- Butcher Babies
- The Byrds

== C ==
- Candygram for Mongo
- Canned Heat
- Capital Cities
- Captain Beefheart
- The Carpenters
- The Chambers Brothers
- Channel 3
- Charles Wright & the Watts 103rd Street Rhythm Band
- Children
- Chicano Batman
- China White
- Chokebore
- Christian Death
- Circle Jerks
- Cirith Ungol
- Coal Chamber
- Coasters
- Coconut Records
- Cold Forty Three
- Cold War Kids
- Concrete Blonde
- Crazy Town
- Crosby, Stills & Nash
- Cryptic Slaughter
- Cruzados
- A Cursive Memory
- Cypress Hill

== D ==
- Dada
- Damn Yankees
- Dark Angel
- Dawes
- Dead Meadow
- Dead Sara
- The Deadly Syndrome
- Deap Vally
- Descendents
- Dia de los Muertos
- The Dickies
- The Dils
- dios
- The Distillers
- Divine Heresy
- The Divine Madness
- Djinn
- Djoir
- Dokken
- Don and Dewey
- The Doors
- downset.
- Dramarama
- Dream Syndicate
- Drift
- Dum Dum Girls

== E ==
- Eagles
- Eagles of Death Metal
- Echosmith
- Edward Sharpe & The Magnetic Zeros
- Eels
- Eighteen Visions
- Electric Guest
- Electric Prunes
- Electric Skychurch
- Evildead
- Excel
- The Exies
- Eye Alaska
- Eyes of Fire
- Eyeshine

== F ==
- The Faceless
- Failure
- Family of the Year
- Fanny
- Far East Movement
- Faster Pussycat
- Fear
- Fear Factory
- Felony
- Femme Fatale
- FIDLAR
- Fishbone
- Fitz and the Tantrums
- Five Finger Death Punch
- Flattbush
- The Flesh Eaters
- Flo & Eddie
- Flogging Molly
- Flying Lotus
- Lita Ford
- Fort Minor
- Foster the People
- Foxygen
- From First to Last
- The Furys

== G ==
- Germs
- The Ghost Inside
- Giant Drag
- Global City
- Globus
- The Go-Go's
- Goatsnake
- Grade 8
- Graf Orlock
- Gram Rabbit
- The Grass Roots
- Great White
- Greg & Steve
- Grouplove
- The Gun Club
- Guns N' Roses

== H ==
- Haim
- Half Way Home
- Haunted Garage
- Health
- Hed PE
- Hellion
- Hellogoodbye
- Hepcat
- Herb Alpert
- Hirax
- Hole
- The Hollywood Argyles
- The Hollywood Flames
- Hollywood Rose
- The Hollywood Stars
- Hollywood Undead
- Julia Holter
- Bob Holz
- Honk
- Hoobastank
- Horse the Band
- Hotwire
- House of Lords
- The Human Abstract
- Human Drama
- HWA

== I ==
- Icarus Line
- Icebird
- Los Illegals
- Illuminati Hotties
- Ima Robot
- Incubus
- In This Moment
- Infectious Grooves
- The Iron Maidens
- IMx

== J ==
- Jack Mack and the Heart Attack
- Jack's Mannequin
- Jan and Dean
- Jane's Addiction

== K ==
- Keel
- King Kobra
- Kitten
- Kommunity FK
- Mike Krol
- Kush
- Kyuss
- The Kids of Widney High

== L ==
- L7
- L.A. Guns
- Lady Danville
- L.A.P.D.
- Latin Playboys
- Lavender Diamond
- Leatherwolf
- Letlive.
- Lifehouse
- The Linda Lindas
- Linkin Park
- Little Feat
- Lizzy Borden
- LMFAO
- Los Lobos
- Local Natives
- Loggins and Messina
- London
- London After Midnight
- Loomis & the Lust
- Los Angeles League of Musicians
- Love
- Love/Hate
- Low vs. Diamond
- LPG
- Lyrics Of Two

== M ==
- Malice
- The Mamas and The Papas
- The Marías
- Maroon 5
- Medication
- Medicine
- Megadeth
- Metallica
- Methods of Mayhem
- Metro Station
- Midnight Movies
- Mika Miko
- A Million Pieces
- Minutemen
- Missing Persons
- MKTO
- Moaning
- Monkees
- The Motels
- Mothers of Invention
- Mötley Crüe
- Mr. Big
- Mr. Mister
- MUNA
- My Ruin
- mygrain
- Mystic Braves

== N ==
- Vince Neil
- Nekrogoblikon
- Nelson
- Nitro
- NOFX
- No Age
- No Doubt
- Nude
- The Nymphs
- N.W.A.

== O ==
- Odd Modern
- Off!
- The Offspring
- OFWGKTA
- ohGr
- Oingo Boingo
- Omen
- Orange
- Orgy
- Otep
- Ounce of Self
- Ozomatli

== P ==
- The Pandoras
- The Penguins
- Pennywise
- Pete RG
- Phantom Blue
- Phantom Planet
- Picture Me Broken
- The Pity Party
- Platters
- Plexi
- The Plimsouls
- The Plugz
- Poco
- Poison
- Polar Bear
- Porno For Pyros
- Powerflo
- The Postal Service
- Pretty Boy Floyd
- Project 86
- Psi Com
- Psycho Realm

== Q ==
- Queens of the Stone Age
- Quetzal
- Quiet Riot

== R ==
- R5
- Racer X
- Rage Against the Machine
- Ratt
- Record Year
- The Red Aunts
- Red Hot Chili Peppers
- Redd Kross
- Redemption
- Reel Big Fish
- Renegade
- Rilo Kiley
- Ritchie Valens
- Rooney
- Rose Royce
- Rough Cutt
- The Runaways
- The ReAktion

== S ==
- Saccharine Trust
- Saint Motel
- The Salvation Army
- Saosin
- Saviour Machine
- Say Anything
- Scarling.
- Scars On Broadway
- The Scream
- The Screamers
- Screams for Tina
- Sea Wolf
- The Seeds
- Shattered Faith
- She Wants Revenge
- Shiny Toy Guns
- Shotgun Messiah
- Shwayze
- Silent Civilian
- Silversun Pickups
- Sister
- Sixx:A.M.
- The Skulls
- Sky Ferreira
- Slayer
- Slightly Stoopid
- Smallpools
- Snoop Dogg
- Social Distortion
- Sound Barrier
- SouthGang
- Sparks
- Spindrift
- Spineshank
- Spock's Beard
- Starbomb
- Starcrawler
- The Standells
- Static-X
- Steppenwolf
- Stone Poneys
- Strawberry Alarm Clock
- Stryper
- Sublime
- The Submarines
- Suburban Legends
- Sugar Ray
- Suicidal Tendencies
- Suicide Silence
- Super Heroines
- Swampwater
- System of a Down

== T ==
- Talk Time
- that dog.
- Thee Midniters
- Them Crooked Vultures
- Three Dog Night
- The Three O'Clock
- Thrice
- Throwdown
- Tool
- Toto
- Tourniquet
- Traveling Wilburys
- Truth & Salvage Co.
- T.S.O.L.
- Tunnel Rats
- Tura Satana
- The Turtles

== U ==
- The Untouchables

== V ==
- Van Halen
- The Vandals
- Velvet Revolver
- Venus and the Razorblades
- Viking
- Vinnie Vincent Invasion
- Vixen
- Volumes
- Voodoo Glow Skulls

== W ==
- Wall of Voodoo
- The Wallflowers
- War
- War Tapes
- Warbringer
- The Warlocks
- Warpaint
- Warrant
- Warrior
- W.A.S.P.
- Wasted Youth
- Wednesday Week
- Weezer
- Weird Al Yankovic
- The Weirdos
- The West Coast Pop Art Experimental Band
- Windows

== X ==
- X
- X-Sinner
- XYZ

== Y ==
- Yellowjackets
- Young the Giant
- The Young Veins
- Youth Brigade

== Z ==
- Frank Zappa
- The Zeros
- Zulu

== See also ==
- List of musicians from the Inland Empire
