= Raindrops on the Open Road =

EP by Windows
- Released: March 27, 2024
- Recorded: 2019–2022
- Length: 26:51
- Labels: Starlite (US); Deli
- Producer: Rocco Guarino

Raindrops on the Open Road is the debut EP from Los Angeles country-psych outfit Windows. The five-song EP was recorded at Ran Pink and Rami Jaffee's (The Wallflowers) studio Fonogenic over the span of a year. The tracks were produced, engineered and mixed by Rocco Guarino and released on both Starlite Records and Deli Records founded by Windows front man Matteo Arias. The songs on the EP represent concepts conceived over the last decade of Arias' musical career—dreamt up while touring and living on the road with other bands such as Golden Animals and Vox Waves. The band intends the songs to be evocative of old California country rock bands like Canned Heat, the Lovin' Spoonful and Relatively Clean Rivers with a modern dose of psychedelia. The band celebrated the release of the EP at a release party at Zebulon in Los Angeles on March 27, 2024.

== Track listing ==
All tracks are written by Matthew Arias.

Raindrops on the Open Road track listing
No.	Title	Lead vocals	Length
1.	"Wanted to Know"	Arias	5:15
2.	"SR89"	Arias	3:07
3.	"Raindrops"	Arias	6:46
4.	"Don't Stare at the Sun"	Arias	4:22
5.	"Green Lagoon"	Arias	7:18
Total length:			26:51

== Personnel ==
Band

- Matteo Arias – lead vocals, guitar
- Spencer Alarcon – lead guitar
- Sam Wotherspoon – bass guitar
- Justin Tyler Smith – drums, synthesizer, tambourine

Additional musicians

- Ian Doer – vocal harmonies, electric piano, synthesizer
- Mikey Whiteside – piano, synthesizer
- Joseph Loeffler – additional drums
- Roberto Rodriguez Salguero – latin percussion

Recording personnel

- Rocco Guarino – producer, recording, mixing
- Ian Doer – additional production
- Ignacio Gonzalez – additional production

Artwork

- Marissa Yardley Clifford – photography
- Matteo Arias – design
