= New Candys =

Italian alternative rock band

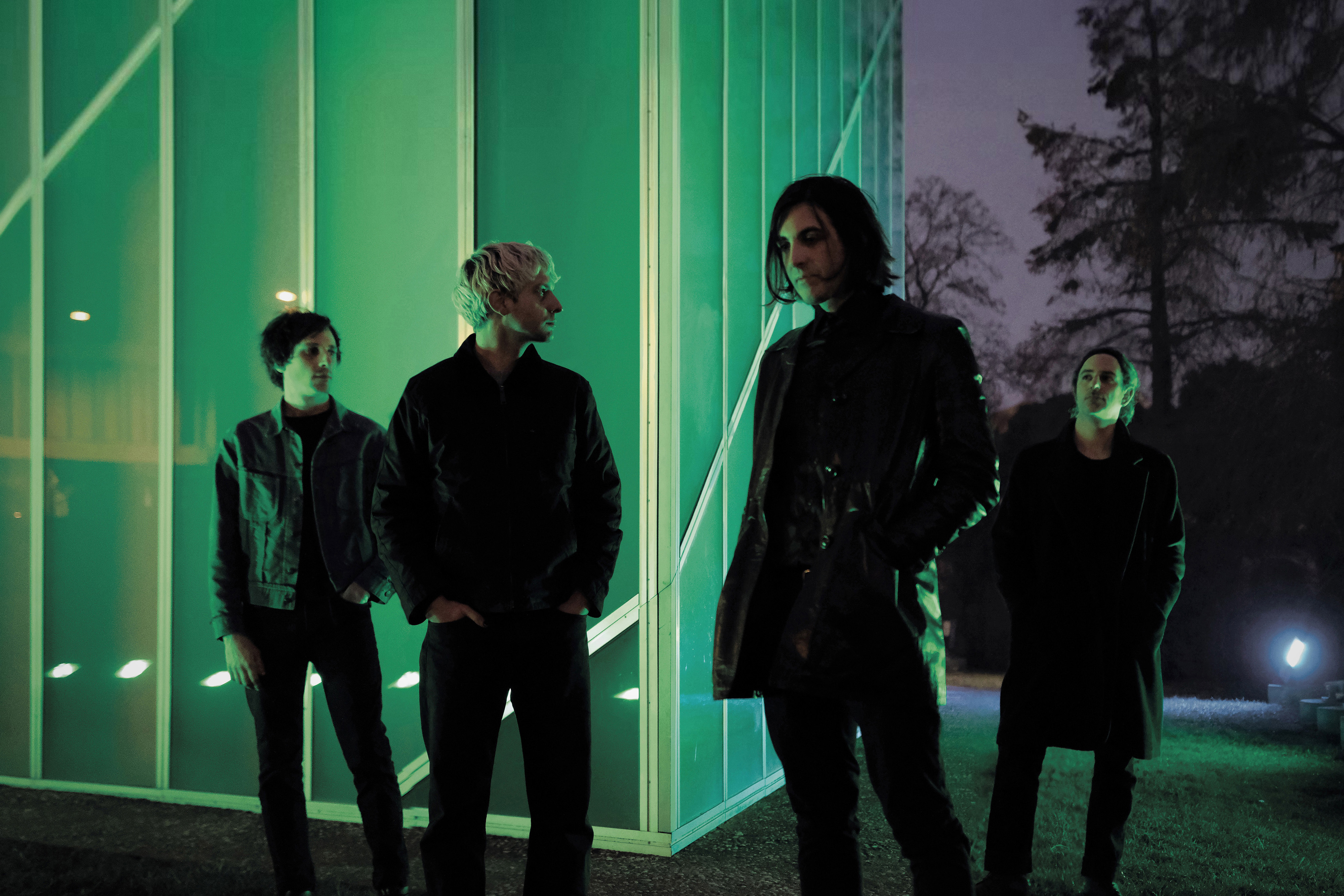
- New Candys in 2026. From left: Francesco Sicchieri, Emanuele Zanardo, Fernando Nuti and Dario Lucchesi

Background information
- Origin: Venice, Italy
- Genres: Alternative rock; indie rock; psychedelic rock
- Years active: 2008 – present
- Labels: Fuzz Club, Dischi Sotterranei, Little Cloud Records, Picture In My Ear, Foolica
- Members: Fernando Nuti (lead vocals, guitar, sitar, synthesizer, programming); Dario Lucchesi (bass, synthesizer, programming); Emanuele Zanardo (lead guitar, backing vocals); Francesco Sicchieri (drums, percussion, sampler)
- Website: https://newcandys.com/

New Candys is an Italian alternative rock band formed in Venice in 2008. Founded by songwriter and singer-guitarist Fernando Nuti alongside former drummer and current bassist-synth player Dario Lucchesi, the lineup is completed by Emanuele Zanardo on lead guitar and backing vocals and Francesco Sicchieri on drums and sampler.

== History ==
=== Formation and Stars Reach The Abyss (2008–2014) ===
The band was formed in 2008 by Fernando Nuti (lead vocals, guitar), Diego Menegaldo (lead guitar, backing vocals), Stefano Bidoggia (bass guitar) and Dario Lucchesi (drums, percussion).

Over the next two years, the band performed extensively around Venice, leading to the release of their self-produced EP on 7 July 2010. After receiving positive press in Italy, culminating in a performance at Rockit's Mi Ami Festival in Milan in 2011, they were signed by Foolica and recorded their debut album, Stars Reach The Abyss, which was released on 23 March 2012. Produced by Pierluigi Ballarin and Stefano Moretti and mastered by Jon Astley, the release took them on tour in England and across Italy, supporting acts like Dead Skeletons and Crystal Stilts. The band also participated in the show Twilight on Rai Radio 2, performing some songs acoustically. "Meltdown Corp." was later featured on The Reverb Conspiracy Vol. 3, a compilation of top underground psych-rock bands by Fuzz Club and The Reverberation Appreciation Society.

=== New Candys As Medicine (2015–2016) ===
Released on 16 March 2015, New Candys As Medicine marked the band's second studio album, launched through the Minneapolis label Picture In My Ear and accompanied by a special vinyl edition from Fuzz Club. Mixed by John Wills, the producer and drummer of Loop, it was also distributed by The Committee to Keep Music Evil. Preceded by a 10” split single with Kill Your Boyfriend, featuring the single "Dark Love" and the exclusive track "Surf 2", the album garnered acclaim from notable figures like Simone Marie Butler of Primal Scream and Stephen Lawrie of The Telescopes, and was recognized by Orange Amplification. Over the next two years, the band completed three European tours and played festivals including Secret Garden Party 2015, Liverpool International Festival of Psychedelia 2016 and Barcelona Psych Fest 2017, while supporting acts such as The Vaccines.

=== Bleeding Magenta (2017–2020) ===
New Candys’ third album, Bleeding Magenta, was released on 8 October 2017 by Fuzz Club and repressed by Little Cloud Records in 2018. Produced by the band, the album garnered critical acclaim from outlets such as Clash and Drowned in Sound. Notably, two tracks from the album, along with one from the previous record, were featured in three episodes of Showtime’s original series Shameless.

Andrea Volpato joined the band for the European tour in late 2017, which included a headlining performance at SpaceFest in Poland. The band's international recognition consolidated in 2018, first with a tour in Australia, headlining both the Sydney and Melbourne Psych Fests and participating in the Adelaide Fringe Festival, followed by a tour of the United States and Mexico that included a live session on KEXP in Seattle. The American tour, which started with two concerts in New York, continued along the West Coast, including stops at the historic Pappy & Harriet's in Pioneertown, Bajo Circuito in Mexico City and Highland Park Bowl in Los Angeles.

Prior to the Australian tour, Stefano Bidoggia departed from the band, followed by Diego Menegaldo after the North American tour. In June 2018, Alessandro Boschiero joined on bass. Later that summer, the band performed at Fuzz Club Eindhoven 2018 and supported The Brian Jonestown Massacre during their two Italian shows. In 2019, they embarked on a back-to-back tour of Europe, the US and Canada, including notable appearances at Desert Stars Festival in Joshua Tree, Milwaukee Psych Fest, The Echo in Los Angeles, Hotel Vegas in Austin and Mercury Lounge in New York. A third European tour took place in September, featuring performances at Levitation France and alongside The Warlocks and The Dandy Warhols. In January 2020, New Candys played in the Balkans for the first time.

=== Vyvyd (2021–2024) ===
New Candys’ fourth album, Vyvyd, was released on 4 June 2021 via Little Cloud Records and Dischi Sotterranei, with an exclusive vinyl edition from Fuzz Club. Mixed by Grammy Award-winning producer Tommaso Colliva, known for his work with Muse, Damon Albarn, and The Jesus and Mary Chain, the album received critical acclaim. Under the Radar wrote that Vyvyd "takes the best of psych and shoegaze, adds an effective strain of driving originality and songwriting chops, and dresses it up in a satisfying intensity”, while KEXP's Music Director Don Yates declared the album to be “a solid set of shoegazer psych-rock with fuzzy guitars, atmospheric synths, heavy rhythms, detached vocals, and hypnotic song hooks” whilst DJ John Richards said fans of Black Rebel Motorcycle Club, Ride or The Jesus and Mary Chain will love the album. Notably, "Begin Again" was described by producer Gordon Raphael as "incredibly good" and it was featured on the "Sacred Bones Now Playing" playlist curated by the renowned record label. Tracks like "Zyko" and "Evil Evil" received multiple airplays on BBC Radio 6 Music during Iggy Confidential, hosted by Iggy Pop, who described the band as "kinky.”

On 14 May 2021, due to the inability to perform live caused by COVID-19 pandemic restrictions, the band participated in the online edition of The Great Escape Festival. From winter 2021 to summer 2022, despite several reschedules caused by ongoing restrictions, New Candys toured extensively, kicking off in Europe with performances at Croc' The Rock Festival in Lausanne and Synästhesie Festival in Berlin, followed by a tour in the UK and France. They completed two North American tours between March and May 2022, playing at venues such as Zebulon in Los Angeles and Mississippi Studios in Portland, as well as festivals like Freakout Weekender in Seattle, Treefort Music Fest in Boise and SXSW in Austin, where they recorded a session for Jam in the Van, subsequently released digitally. In June, they supported The Dandy Warhols for eleven shows in Europe and the UK, including historic venues like the Olympia Hall in Paris and The Roundhouse in London, receiving praise from Anton Newcombe after a Berlin concert. The digital release of "Zyko (The Dandy Warhols Remix)" remixed by Peter Holmström, preceded their tour supporting the band. They performed at Devilstone Fest in Lithuania on 16 July, then toured the US again, focusing on South Central states, culminating in the festival Psycho Las Vegas. They concluded 2022 with performances in Germany, France, Spain and Portugal. Alessandro Boschiero and Andrea Volpato departed from the band in October 2022.

On 5 January 2023, New Candys announced European shows, including seven in support of The Black Angels at venues like Arena in Vienna and Huxleys Neue Welt in Berlin. Emanuele Zanardo and Francesco Giacomin then joined the band, taking up roles on lead guitar and backing vocals, and drums and sampler, respectively. On 12 May 2023, they released the single "Everything's Fucking Boring" as a limited 7” vinyl by Dischi Sotterranei, which premiered on Radio DeeJay. Written by Bugo in its original Italian version, the song was revisited in English with a different arrangement, and he also participated in its making by playing guitar, harmonica and providing backing vocals. During 2023, Dario Lucchesi transitioned from drums to bass, with the new lineup debuting live on 17 November 2023.

=== The Uncanny Extravaganza (2025–present) ===
In 2024, the band signed with Fuzz Club, and on 5 March 2025, the title of their new album, The Uncanny Extravaganza, was revealed alongside the lead single, "Regicide". The album, released on 30 May, blends the group’s psych-rock roots with fresh electronic influences and cutting-edge production by Maurizio Baggio (The Soft Moon, Boy Harsher). Described by the band as an anti-concept album, it is characterized by songs that are highly diverse from one another. The Uncanny Extravaganza was ranked fifth among the ten best albums of 2025 by Rolling Stone, according to Miles Klee, and 149th out of 300 on The Big Takeover’s ranking, according to Editor-in-Chief Jack Rabid.

To promote the album, New Candys embarked on an international tour. Between May and June, they toured Europe and the United Kingdom, playing sold-out shows in London and Paris. They also performed at the Fuzz Club Festival in Eindhoven and Levitation France in Angers, and played with La Femme at Universe in Athens. In July, they returned to Australia and performed in New Zealand for the first time, headlining a series of shows that included sold-out dates in Melbourne, Sydney, Christchurch and Auckland. During the tour, they also recorded a live session for ABC Radio Australia. In September and October, they continued touring Europe, with dates mainly in Germany, Scandinavia and Eastern Europe, including a sold-out show in Copenhagen and another performance in Athens.

In 2026, Francesco Sicchieri joined the band on drums and sampler. In April, the band toured Spain and Portugal, including a performance at Barcelona Psych Fest, held at Paral·lel 62. From 28 April to 30 May, New Candys completed a 23-date North American tour across the United States, Canada and Mexico, playing venues including TV Eye in New York City, the Wise Hall in Vancouver and the Star Theater in Portland. The tour concluded with concerts in Guadalajara, Querétaro and Mexico City, which were preceded by interviews with the Mexican publications Milenio, La Tempestad and Filter México. It also included a performance at Austin Psych Fest, where Austin Town Hall called the band's set "a festival highlight" and described them as being "at the top of their game".

In August, "Half-Heart", from the band's debut album Stars Reach The Abyss, was featured in the first episode of the fifth season of the Netflix series Outer Banks.

== Band Members ==
Current members

- Fernando Nuti - lead vocals, guitar (2008–present), synthesizer, programming (2023–present), sitar (2008–2017)
- Dario Lucchesi - bass, synthesizer, programming (2023–present), drums, percussion, sampler (2008-2023)
- Emanuele Zanardo - lead guitar, backing vocals (2023-present)
- Francesco Sicchieri - drums, percussion, sampler (2026–present)

Former members

- Diego Menegaldo - lead guitar, backing vocals (2008–2018)
- Stefano Bidoggia - bass (2008–2018)
- Andrea Volpato - lead guitar, backing vocals (2017–2022)
- Alessandro Boschiero - bass (2018–2022)
- Francesco Giacomin - drums, percussion, sampler (2023–2025)

Former touring musicians

- Marco Fabris - drums, percussion (Australia Tour 2018)
- Blair Wittstadt - bass (Australia Tour 2018)
- Andrea Davì - drums, percussion, sampler (Europe Tour September 2022)
- Marco Contestabile - bass (2023)

== Discography ==
Studio Albums

- 2012 - Stars Reach The Abyss
- 2015 - New Candys As Medicine
- 2017 - Bleeding Magenta
- 2021 - Vyvyd
- 2025 - The Uncanny Extravaganza

EPs

- 2010 - New Candys

Singles

- 2015 - Dark Love / Surf 2
- 2022 - Zyko (The Dandy Warhols Remix)
- 2023 - Everything's Fucking Boring (feat. Bugo)

Compilations

- 2012 - #Fosbury10
- 2015 - The Reverb Conspiracy Vol. 3
- 2016 - Volumes
- 2025 - Fuzz Club 2025

Soundtracks

- 2013 - Delirium: A Trip Of Madness (movie by Pablo Aguiar)
- 2015 - Magasin (short film by Jordy Tempelman)
- 2016 - Shameless, episode 10.7 "Ride or die" (television series by Paul Abbott)
- 2017 - Shameless, episode 4.8 "Fuck Paying It Forward" (television series by Paul Abbott)
- 2017 - Shameless, episode 6.8 "Icarus Fell And Rusty Ate Him" (television series by Paul Abbott)
- 2018 - GoPro: Valentino Rossi - Origins - Tavullia & MotoGP™ (YouTube video)
- 2021 - Made in Chelsea, episode 11.22 (British structured-reality television series broadcast by E4)
- 2026 - Outer Banks, episode 1.5 "The Crossing" (television series by Josh Pate, Jonas Pate and Shannon Burke)
