= Windows (country-psych band) =

American band

- Windows in 2025

Background information
- Origin: Los Angeles, California, U.S.
- Genres: Rock; country; psychedelic; pop
- Years active: 2018–present
- Labels: Starlite; Deli
- Members: Matteo Arias; Nick Dehmlow; Mikey Whiteside; Marissa Yardley Clifford; Julian Ducatenzeiler
- Past members: Spencer Alarcon; Sam Wotherspoon; Justin Smith; Eyal Lidergot; Anthony Aragon; Joe Budina; Troy Tate; Joe Loeffler
- Website: windowstheband.com

Windows is a Los Angeles–based country-psych band founded in 2018 by musician Matteo Arias.

== History ==
Windows was founded as a bedroom recording project in 2018 by Matteo Arias. He was soon joined Spencer Alarcon, and later by Australian bassist Sam Wotherspoon. Windows' sound consists of old California country, classic surf rock, and West Coast psychedelia. In February 2019, the band released their first single, "The Ballad of Whiskey Pete". In 2020, the band planned to release their debut LP, but in light of the COVID-19 outbreak decided to instead write and record two singles remotely while locked down in quarantine. The singles were independently released on July 2. After the pandemic, Arias began work on a new music with a new line up including some members of his former band Golden Animals. In February 2023, the band released their first two studio singles—"High Sierra Lows" and "Long-While". Later that same year the band released two additional singles—"Fernwood Ave." and "Upstairs". In March 2024, the band released their debut EP Raindrops on the Open Road, recorded at Fonogenic Studios in Van Nuys, California and produced and engineered by Arias' friend Rocco Guarino. In 2024 the band started recording their second major release with friend and producer Tyler Fogerty, son of American musician John Fogerty. In January 2025 they announced their participation at Austin Psych Fest 2025. In April of 2025 the band released the singles "That's When" and "Light in the Dark" through LA based label Deli Records.

== Discography ==
=== Extended plays ===
List of extended plays, with selected details
Title	Details
Raindrops on the Open Road	Released: 27 March 2024; Label: Starlite (US), Deli; Formats: digital download, streaming

=== Singles ===
List of singles, showing year released and album name
Title	Year
"The Ballad of Whiskey Pete"	2019
"Send It" / "Up All Night"	2020
"High Sierra Lows"	2023
"Long-While"	2023
"Fernwood Ave."	2023
"Upstairs"	2023
"Raindrops"	2024
"That’s When"	2025
"Light in the dark"	2025
