= Levitation (festival) =

Annual music festival in Austin, Texas

Levitation and Austin Psych Fest are two annual multi-day music festivals developed and produced by The Reverberation Appreciation Society. Starting out under the name Austin Psych Fest as a single-location, three-day festival, the festival was renamed Levitation in its eighth year to celebrate Austin's psychedelic rock pioneers the 13th Floor Elevators. For many of its earlier iterations, the festival was held at Carson Creek Ranch in Austin, Texas. Under the Levitation moniker, the festival eventually transitioned to a four-day festival spread out across many traditional venues in the city of Austin. Starting in 2024, the organizers now run both festivals every year under their respective monikers, with Austin Psych Fest held in the spring at a single location and Levitation held in the fall as a multi-venue festival.

Inspired by the 1960s and festivals like ATP and Primavera Sound, they created a music festival. Over the years, this independent event has grown into a full-weekend festival that attracts international attendees.

The Reverberation Appreciation Society is a creative collective composed of Rob Fitzpatrick, Oswald James, and Christian Bland and Alex Maas of the Black Angels. In addition to the festival in Austin, the group has branched out into other cities beginning in 2013 with Levitation France and in 2015 with Levitation Vancouver and Levitation Chicago. The group also runs The Reverberation Appreciation Society record label and has curated events at Austin's SXSW, The Netherlands' Le Guess Who?, NYC's CMJ and NRMAL in Mexico City.

== Levitation Austin ==
The inaugural Austin Psych Fest was held on Saturday 8 March 2008 at The Red Barn in north Austin, featuring performances by the Black Angels, Ringo Deathstarr, Horse + Donkey among others.

In 2009, the festival was extended to three days and was held from March 13–15 at the Radio Room, a short lived venue on Sixth Street. the Seeds' Sky Saxon performed with Shapes Have Fangs as his backing band and Austin psychedelic legends the Golden Dawn performed their 1968 album "Power Plant" in its entirety. The lineup included modern psychedelic heavies Dead Meadow, A Place to Bury Strangers, Wooden Shjips, the Warlocks, and the Black Angels.

The third Austin Psych Fest was held April 23–25, 2010 at The Mohawk, a multi-stage venue on Red River. 41 acts performed, among them, the Raveonettes, Warpaint, the Gaslamp Killer, the Black Angels and 1960s legends Silver Apples.

The 2011 festival was held on April 29-May 1 at the 1950s art deco Seaholm Power Plant, a decommissioned steam power plant on the banks of Lady Bird Lake in downtown Austin that had been made temporarily available for events. Due to changes in city ordinances and construction plans, the festival changed venues 3 times before landing back at its originally intended location, The Seaholm Power Plant, and the festival would be the last concert held within the plant's walls. The 63 band bill was topped by Roky Erickson of the 13th Floor Elevators, Spacemen 3 offshoot Spectrum, Omar A Rodriguez group playing as the Mars Volta lineup, Crystal Stilts, the first performance from Black Moth Super Rainbow in several years, and The Black Angels.

Austin Psych Fest 2012 was held April 27–29 at the east-side location of legendary music venue Emo's in conjunction with the Beauty Ballroom. The 5th annual festival featured a 61 band lineup including the Brian Jonestown Massacre, the Black Angels, and the Black Lips along with Meat Puppets, the Olivia Tremor Control, Thee Oh Sees, and Bombino, among others.

The 2013 and 2014 festivals were held at Carson Creek Ranch in Austin, Texas, located on the Colorado River (Texas). The 2013 festival, the 6th annual festival, held April 26–28, was the first year for the festival to be held at a completely outdoor venue, as well as the first year to have 3 stages of music, camping, and a poster series featuring US and international artists. The seventh annual festival, held May 2–4, 2014, included 1960s legends the Zombies, as well as Panda Bear, the Horrors, Loop, the Brian Jonestown Massacre, of Montreal, the Dandy Warhols, The Black Angels and many more.

In late 2014 The Reverberation Appreciation Society changed the festival's name from Austin Psych Fest to Levitation, titled after a track by Austin psychedelic legends the 13th Floor Elevators.

The 2015 festival was held May 8–10 at Carson Creek Ranch. The lineup included the Flaming Lips, the Jesus and Mary Chain, Primal Scream, Spiritualized, Tame Impala as well as a reunion performance by the 13th Floor Elevators, the band's first performance in 45 years.

The dates for the 2016 festival were April 29 - May 1, 2016, and the lineup featured Brian Wilson performing Pet Sounds, Ween, Animal Collective, Caribou, Flying Lotus, Slowdive, Courtney Barnett, Sleep, The Arcs, Brian Jonestown Massacre and many more.

The 2016 festival at Carson Creek Ranch was cancelled due to severe weather which caused significant damage to the festival grounds and infrastructure. In response over 20 concerts were organized in downtown Austin hosting the lineup and attendees.

In November 2016, festival organizers announced that the festival would not be held in 2017 but would return in 2018.

Owing to the COVID-19 pandemic, the festival went on hiatus in 2020. The next year saw the hiatus extended by a year. Levitation resumed with its anticipated 2022 lineup.

Levitation hosted Kikagaku Moyo for their last tour in the USA in 2022 at South Austin venue The Far Out Lounge, supported by Austin-based group Nolan Potter & the Nightmare Band. The following year, Levitation would return to the Far Out Lounge with the revived single-location, three-day Austin Psych Fest.

Levitation 2025, which took place September 25 - 28, embraced a hybrid venue approach. The main festival was located at the Palmer Events Center Friday through Sunday, while additional late-night shows were booked at venues around town. The festival at Palmer began with a dedicated metal day opening with the fantasy doom band Castle Rat and ending with genre legends Mastodon. The next two days included a pallet expanding blend of music styles and concluded with a performance by Pavement.

== Levitation France ==
Created in 2013, Levitation France is held annually at Le Chabada in Angers, France. The first Levitation France was held on September 20–21, 2013, hosting a 17-band lineup including The Black Angels, Dead Meadow, Night Beats, Wall of Death, and The UFO Club. The second Levitation France festival was held September 19–20, 2014 and included Loop, Moon Duo, Woods, Allah-Las, La Femme, and Al Lover. Levitation France 2015 took place September 18–19, 2015.

== Films ==
The Reverberation Appreciation Society has released a number of concert films. I've Got Levitation documents the 50th anniversary reunion of The 13th Floor Elevators at the Levitation 2015 music festival, the band's first performance in 45 years. The documentary, directed by James Oswald and Jack Henry Robbins, offers an immersive glimpse into the festival with interviews and performances by The 13th Floor Elevators, The Flaming Lips, The Black Angels, Jesus And Mary Chain, The GOASTT (Sean Lennon), Thee Oh Sees, Fuzz (Ty Segall), Mac Demarco, Lightning Bolt, Night Beats, and others. The film premiered at Alamo Drafthouse on April 25, 2018.

Austin Psych Fest: Beyond the Third Sound features footage from Austin Psych Fest 2013 and includes performances and interviews with The Black Angels, Roky Erickson, Clinic, White Fence, Acid Mothers Temple, and Tinariwen, among others. Other concert films released include APF 2012, APF 2011 "Live at the Power Plant," and APF 3, which features footage from Austin Psych Fest 2010.

== Austin lineups ==
=== 2025 ===
- Mastodon
- Acid Bath
- The Sword
- Blood Incantation
- The Armed
- Secret Chiefs 3
- Castle Rat
- Rickshaw Billie's Burger Patrol
- Skloss
- TV on the Radio
- Unknown Mortal Orchestra
- The Brian Jonestown Massacre
- Blonde Redhead
- Wednesday
- La Femme
- The Raveonettes
- Swervedriver
- Model/Actriz
- Yin Yin
- Hooveriii
- Pavement
- Built to Spill
- The Black Angels
- Destroyer
- Frankie and the Witch Fingers
- A Place to Bury Strangers
- Being Dead
- Upchuck
- Diles Que No Me Matén
- Daiistar
- Population II

=== 2016 ===
- Brian Wilson performing Pet Sounds
- Animal Collective
- Caribou
- Flying Lotus
- Slowdive
- Sleep
- Nicolas Jaar
- The Brian Jonestown Massacre
- The Black Angels
- Ty Segall
- Lee "Scratch" Perry
- Sunn O)))
- Super Furry Animals
- Royal Trux
- Boris
- Thurston Moore Band
- Black Mountain
- Allah-Las
- Uncle Acid & the Deadbeats
- Parquet Courts
- Dungen
- Oneohtrix Point Never
- Shabazz Palaces
- Woods
- King Gizzard & the Lizard Wizard - Live album
- Lee Ranaldo
- Twin Peaks
- La Luz
- Boogarins
- Heron Oblivion
- Imarhan
- Purson
- Quraishi
- Mild High Club
- Israel Nash
- Fantasmes
- Chicano Batman
- Ultimate Painting
- Asteroid #4
- Bayonne
- La Mecanica Popular
- Blondi's Salvation
- The Murlocs
- Flavor Crystal
- JJUUJJUU
- Cellar Doors

=== 2015 ===
- The 13th Floor Elevators
- The Flaming Lips
- Tame Impala
- Primal Scream
- The Jesus and Mary Chain
- Spiritualized
- The Black Angels
- Thee Oh Sees
- Mac DeMarco
- Lightning Bolt
- The Sword
- The GOASTT
- Earth
- DIIV
- Health
- A Place to Bury Strangers
- This Will Destroy You
- Fuzz * The Soft Moon
- METZ * White Fence
- Hundred Visions
- Tamaryn
- Night Beats
- The Fat White Family
- Mini Mansions
- Föllakzoid
- The Black Ryder
- Ringo Deathstarr
- Indian Jewelry
- Nothing
- The Myrrors * Mystic Braves
- Spindrift
- Las Robertas
- Holy Wave
- Vaadat Charigim
- Willie Thrasher & Linda Saddlebeck
- Ryley Walker * Mugstar
- The Flowers of Hell
- The Blank Tapes
- Fever the Ghost
- Mr. Elevator & The Brain Hotel
- ZZZ's * Eternal Tapestry
- Samsara Blues Experiment
- Paperhead
- White Manna
- Gourishankar Karmakar & Indrajit Banarjee
- Jeff Zeigler & Mary Lattimore
- Chui Wan
- SURVIVE
- Los Mundos
- LA Witch
- Heaters
- Sungod
- The Holydrug Couple
- Creepoid
- Ex Cult
- The Well
- Tele Novella
- Ryan Sambol
- Dallas Acid
- Baby Robots
- Hollow Trees

=== 2014 ===
- The Brian Jonestown Massacre
- The Dandy Warhols
- The Zombies
- The Black Angels
- Black Lips
- Acid Mothers Temple
- Graveyard
- Shannon and the Clams
- King Gizzard and the Lizard Wizard - Live album
- The Fresh & Onlys
- Quilt
- Liars
- La Femme
- White Hills
- Kadavar
- The Horrors
- Unknown Mortal Orchestra
- Temples
- Bombino
- Dead Meadow
- The Golden Dawn
- Bardo Pond
- Boogarins
- Of Montreal
- Avey Tare's Slasher Flicks
- Medicine
- The Octopus Project
- Zombie Zombie
- Yamantaka // Sonic Titan
- Loop
- Panda Bear
- The War on Drugs
- Mikal Cronin
- The Young
- Pink Mountaintops
- Sleepy Sun
- Joel Gion & The Primary Colours
- Tobacco
- Bo Ningen
- Earthless
- Toy
- Guardian Alien
- Steve Gunn
- Woods
- Gap Dream
- Hollis Brown
- Brown Sabbath
- Terakaft
- Bone Fur & Feathers
- Peaking Lights
- Aqua Nebula Oscillator
- Roger Sellers
- The Eagle's Gift
- Morgan Delt
- Pure X
- Residuels
- Mirror Travel
- Jacco Gardner
- Barn Owl
- Mark McGuire
- Circuit Des Yeux
- Mono
- Moon Duo
- Destruction Unit
- Dahga Bloom
- Perhaps
- Cosmonauts
- Christian Bland & The Revelators
- Charlie Magira
- Chris Catalena & The Native Americans
- Kikagaku Moyo
- Doug Tuttle
- Greg Ashley
- Fantasmes
- Mind over Mirrors
- Higgins Waterproof Black Magic Band
- Secret Colours
- Lorelle Meets the Obsolete
- Arrington De Dionyso
- Golden Dawn Arkestra
- Think No Think

=== 2013 ===
- The Black Angels
- Roky Erickson
- The Moving Sidewalks
- Silver Apples
- Goat
- Acid Mothers Temple
- Kaleidoscope
- Bass Drum of Death
- The King Khan and BBQ Show
- White Fence
- Om
- The Raveonettes
- Warpaint
- Black Rebel Motorcycle Club
- Tinariwen
- Clinic
- The Growlers
- Deerhunter
- Os Mutantes
- Boris
- The Soft Moon
- The Warlocks
- Wall of Death
- Man or Astro-man?
- Dead Skeletons
- Masaki Batoh's Brain Pulse Music
- Tamaryn
- Gary War
- Suuns
- VietNam
- Black Mountain
- Vinyl Williams
- Indian Jewelry
- Night Beats
- Elephant Stone
- Deap Vally
- Quintron and Miss Pussycat
- The Black Ryder
- Young Magic
- The Laurels
- The Besnard Lakes
- Lumerians
- Spectrum
- The Holydrug Couple
- Holy Wave
- Golden Animals
- The Cult of Dom Keller
- No Joy
- Ride Into the Sun
- The Wolf
- Hollow Trees
- Kay Leotard
- Tjutjuna
- The Shivas
- Capsula
- Black Bananas
- Woodsman
- TTotals
- Jackson Scott
- JJUUJJUU
- St. James Society
- Hearts in Space
- Dreamtime
- LSD and the Search for God

=== 2012 ===
- The Brian Jonestown Massacre
- The Black Angels
- Black Lips
- Dead Meadow
- The Golden Dawn
- Bombino
- Meat Puppets
- The Telescopes
- Dead Confederate
- Night Beats
- Thee Oh Sees
- Black Lips
- Pink Mountaintops
- Spindrift
- The Entrance Band
- Disappears
- Allah-Las
- Wooden Shjips
- Ringo Deathstarr
- Singapore Sling
- Sun Araw
- Prince Rama
- Quilt
- Psychic Ills
- The Olivia Tremor Control
- Wall of Death
- Woods
- The Stepkids
- Federale
- The Vacant Lots
- Quest for Fire
- Feathers
- Moon Duo
- MMoss
- Acid Baby Jesus
- The UFO Club
- Holy Wave
- The Meek
- Strangers Family Band
- Cosmonauts
- The Orange Revival
- Al Lover
- Feeding People
- Peaking Lights
- Sleep Over
- Lotus Plaza
- Mind Spiders
- The Astroid #4
- Smoke and Feathers
- Paperhead
- High Wolf
- Amen Dunes
- Pure X
- The Ripe
- The Blue Angel Lounge
- Ancient River
- Secret Colours
- The Cush
- New Fumes
- Brooklyn Raga Association
- Headdress
- The Band in Heaven

=== 2011 ===
- The Black Angels
- Roky Erickson
- Black Moth Super Rainbow
- Tobacco
- Crystal Stilts
- A Place to Bury Strangers
- The Growlers
- This Will Destroy You
- Atlas Sound
- The Fresh & Onlys
- Dirty Beaches
- Pontiak
- The Quarter After
- The Soft Moon
- Bass Drum of Death
- The Black Ryder
- Sleepy Sun
- Prefuse 73
- ST37
- Night Beats
- Indian Jewelry
- Beach Fossils
- The Vacant Lots
- Lumerians
- White Hills
- ZAZA
- Radio Moscow
- Pete International Airport – Members of The Dandy Warhols and The Upsidedown
- Crocodiles
- Wall of Death
- Cloudland Cayon
- Christian Bland
- Shapes Have Fangs
- Omar A Rodriguez playing as The Mars Volta lineup
- The Shine Brothers
- Spectrum
- Holy Wave
- Daughters of the Sun
- Chris Catalena
- The Meek
- The Cult of Dom Keller
- Lower Heaven
- No Joy
- The Blue Angel Lounge
- Zechs Marquis
- Hellfire Social
- Sky Drops
- Beaches
- Woodsman
- Ghost Box Orchestra
- Tjutjuna
- Young Prisms
- Weird Owl
- Diamond Center
- Black Hollies
- Sound Mass
- Cold Sun

=== 2010 ===
- The Black Angels
- Silver Apples
- The Raveonettes
- Warpaint
- Spindrift
- The Gaslamp Killer
- The Warlocks
- Ringo Deathstarr
- Pink Mountaintops
- Indian Jewelry
- Night Beats
- Daughters of the Sun
- Christian Bland & The Revelators
- Golden Animals
- Shapes Have Fangs
- The Tunnels
- Smoke and Feathers
- Headdress
- Von Haze
- PJ and the Bear
- Sisters of Your Sunshine Vapor
- The Vandelles
- Greg Ashley
- The Meek
- The Frequency
- Screen Vinyl Image
- Cry Blood Apache
- City Center
- Telepathik Friend
- Tia Carrera
- Ancient River
- Sky Parade
- Mondo Drag
- Voices Voices
- Yellow Fever
- Pure Ecstasy
- Rayon Beach
- Strangers Family Band
- Ghost Songs
- All in the Golden Afternoon

=== 2009 ===
- The Black Angels
- Sky "Sunlight" Saxon of The Seeds
- Dead Meadow
- The Warlocks
- The Golden Dawn
- Indian Jewelry
- Wooden Shjips
- A Place to Bury Strangers
- The Strange Boys
- The Upsidedown
- Miranda Lee Richards
- Shapes Have Fangs
- Christian Bland & The Revelators
- Daughters of the Sun
- Cavedweller
- Woven Bones
- Lower Heaven
- Golden Animals
- Smoke and Feathers
- Cartright
- Astronaut Suit
- The Astroid #4
- The Tunnels
- PJ and the Bear
- The Shine Brothers
- The Vandelles
- Forever Changes

=== 2008 ===
- The Black Angels
- Spindrift
- The Strange Boys
- Acid Tomb
- The Quarter After
- Ringo Deathstarr
- The Upsidedown
- Horse + Donkey
- The Tunnels
- Astronaut Suit
- Cavedweller

== Angers lineups ==
=== 2014 ===
- Joel Gion
- Woods
- Loop
- Quilt
- Kadavar
- The GOASTT
- Zombie Zombie
- Allah-Las
- The Soft Moon
- Spindrift
- White Hills
- La Femme
- Ben Frost
- Christian Bland & The Revelators
- Moon Duo
- Amen Dunes
- J.C. Satan
- Aqua Nebula Oscillator
- Orval Carlos Sibelius
- The Astroid #4
- Holy Wave
- POW!
- High Wolf
- Al Lover
- The Eagle's Gift

=== 2013 ===
- The Black Angels
- Dead Meadow
- Wall of Death
- The Telescopes
- Dead Skeletons
- Tamikrest
- Temples
- Elephant Stone
- Night Beats
- Damo Suzuki
- Beak>
- Strangers Family Band
- Lonely Walk
- Camera
- Lola Colt
- Blondi's Salvation
- Mars Red Sky

== Chicago lineups ==
=== 2016 ===
- Lightning Bolt (band)
- Chelsea Wolfe
- Health (band)
- Oneohtrix Point Never
- Earthless
- Royal Trux
- Faust (band)
- Gary Wilson
- Ryley Walker
- Night Beats
- Blanck Mass
- Rangda
- Eartheater
- Vaadat Charigim
- Circuit Des Yeux
- Bitchin Bajas
- Night Fields
- Methyl Ethel

=== 2015 ===
- Swervedriver
- Viet Cong
- Atlas Sound
- Oren Ambarchi
- Lumerians
- Destruction Unit
- Mind over Mirrors
- Jeff Zeigler & Mary Lattimore
- Heaters
- The Pop Group
- Noveller
- Camera
- Heat Leisure
- Vision Fortune
- Christines
- Gateway Drugs

== Vancouver lineups ==
=== 2015 ===
- The Black Angels
- Dead Moon
- A Place to Bury Strangers
- Dead Meadow
- The Warlocks
- Joel Gion
- Black Mountain
- Black Lips
- Witch
- Drenge
- Night Beats
- Elephant Stone
- Tobacco
- Atlas Sound
- Ryley Walker
- King Tuff
- Willie Thrasher & Linda Saddlebeck
- Jonathan Toubin's Soul Clap
- Shigeto
- Mystic Braves
- Al Lover
- Peregrine Falls
- Circuit Des Yeux
- Waingro
- JJUUJJUU
- The Shivas
- Sun Ra Star System
- Mr. Elevator & The Brain Hotel
- Amen Dunes
- LA Witch
- Cosmonauts
- Tacocat
- La Luz
- Dead Ghosts
- Dead Quiet
- Curtis Harding
- Mamiffer
- The Backhomes
- Twin River
- Ancients
- Biblical
- White Poppy
- Dada Plan
- Black Wizard
- Gateway Drugs
- Blackbird Blackbird
- Three Wolf Moon
- The Shrine
- All Them Witches

== See also ==
- Music of Austin, Texas
