= Indian jewelry =

Indian jewelry may refer to:

- Indian jewellery
- Indian Jewelry, a noise rock band from Houston, Texas
