= Fred Roggin =

American sports television/radio anchor

- Born: Frederick Jay Roggin; May 6, 1957 (age 69); Detroit, Michigan, U.S.
- Other names: "Freddy Ballgame"; "The Dean"
- Occupations: Actor; TV/Radio presenter; Game show host
- Years active: 1977–present
- Spouses: Eileen Roggin; Richel Roggin
- Children: 5

Frederick Jay Roggin (born May 6, 1957) is an American sports anchor currently with Los Angeles sports radio station KLAC. He is best known for his career at KNBC-TV. Born in Detroit, Michigan, Roggin was also a sports talk radio host at KMPC in Los Angeles and is currently co-hosting, alongside Rodney Peete, an afternoon sports show on KLAC. Roggin's other co-hosts on KLAC had included Los Angeles Times sports columnist T. J. Simers and Simers' daughter Tracy. Roggin served as a host for NBC Sports coverage of the 2008 Summer Olympics.

== Career ==
Roggin also has a national profile, doing occasional work for NBC Sports. He with triathletes Julie Moss and Mike Plant had the call for the tape delayed 1990 Escape from Alcatraz Triathlon. Also, he has become a regular during its coverage of the Olympics. At the 2006, 2010 and 2014 Winter Olympics, he hosted the daily coverage of curling, and at the 2004, 2008 and 2012 Summer Olympics, he was the anchor for boxing coverage from the venue, which aired on CNBC and Universal HD. He was also a play by play announcer on several National Football League telecasts before the network stopped coverage after Super Bowl XXXII in January 1998.

Roggin joined KNBC in December 1980, coming from KPNX in Phoenix, Arizona. Prior to Phoenix, he was the sports anchor on KYEL-TV (now KYMA-DT), in Yuma, Arizona-El Centro, California (1977 to 1978), and for a brief period in 1978 with KVUE in Austin, Texas. He had lived in Calabasas, California, with his wife Richel, a writer, along with their three children.

Roggin hosts a new sports-themed game show, The Challenge, which airs after NBC's Sunday Night Football telecasts locally on KNBC. For several years in the early 1990s, he hosted Roggin's Heroes, a collection of unusual sports highlights presented as a syndicated 30-minute show. Such clips still air as part of his new Sunday night program on KNBC.

Roggin had also done taped sports scores and highlight recaps for NBC's early morning newscasts, which aired on NBC's Early Today and MSNBC's First Look, along with a separate segment for Morning Joe. Previously segments aired on CNBC's former early morning show Wake Up Call.

He also co-hosted the interactive TV show GSN Live on GSN weekdays from 3 PM to 6 PM ET with Debra Skelton until he left the show on July 2, 2009 (and on occasion filled in for Alfonso Ribeiro from 12-3 PM ET). The show started on February 25, 2008. Roggin also started another one of his dreams in 2009, by presenting a game show called The Money List, which was recorded in the UK at The London Studios. The show was based on the United Kingdom's version of Who Dares Wins!. From 2009 - 2013, Roggin hosted the NBC show "The Filter with Fred Roggin" which also starred Melissa Rivers, Charlotte Laws, Debra Wilson, Leo Terrell and Amy Alkon. Roggin and the others discussed the news topics of the day.

On April 14, 2013, NBC's "Going Roggin" debuted at midnight. Airing most Saturdays at 3pm and Sundays at midnight, the 30-minute show offers Roggin's perspective on hot topics in the world of L.A. sports. The crossfire format includes 2 weekly rotated co-contributors on each show. The show also highlights local sports legends as well as interview pro athletes. Most notable contributors include Petros Papadakis (AM 570), Tim Cates (AM 570), Jeff Garcia (The Sports Dude - Power 106), Mark Willard (Fox Sports Radio), J. Woodfin (J from Compton - ESPN), Brian Webber (NBC Sports).

On September 22, 2014, The Fred Roggin Show launched on KFWB in Los Angeles, branded as The Beast 980. The sports radio talk show was heard weekdays from 3pm-6pm on AM 980 in Southern California, as well as KFWB's website (thebeast980.com) and The Beast 980 phone app for Android and iPhone. His show was on the air up until KFWB's sports talk format was discontinued on March 1, 2016.

In August 2016, Roggin became the new co-host of KLAC's noon-to-3 pm show with Leeann Tweeden, replacing Bill Reiter, who exited KLAC to join the CBS Sports Radio network.

In 1993 he was inducted into the Southern California Jewish Sports Hall of Fame. In 2022 he was featured in the Emmy award-winning docu-series I Was There When... on NBC's Peacock.

Roggin departed from KNBC on January 26, 2023. He continues to work in radio along with former National Football League (NFL) quarterback Rodney Peete on KLAC's afternoon sports show Roggin and Rodney. On December 4, 2023, Roggin announced that he would return to television on KMIR-TV, the NBC affiliate in Palm Springs. He anchors The Roggin Report, which is a new 6:30 p.m. program focusing on the news topic of the day featuring reaction and discussion in a fresh new format. The Roggin Report debuted on January 2, 2024, on KMIR-TV. The show is also shown on NBC Palm Springs' Facebook page as part of their livestream of the 6 pm newscast.

Roggin continues to do the Roggin and Rodney radio program from his home in Palm Springs.
