= Feathers (American band) =

American synth-pop band

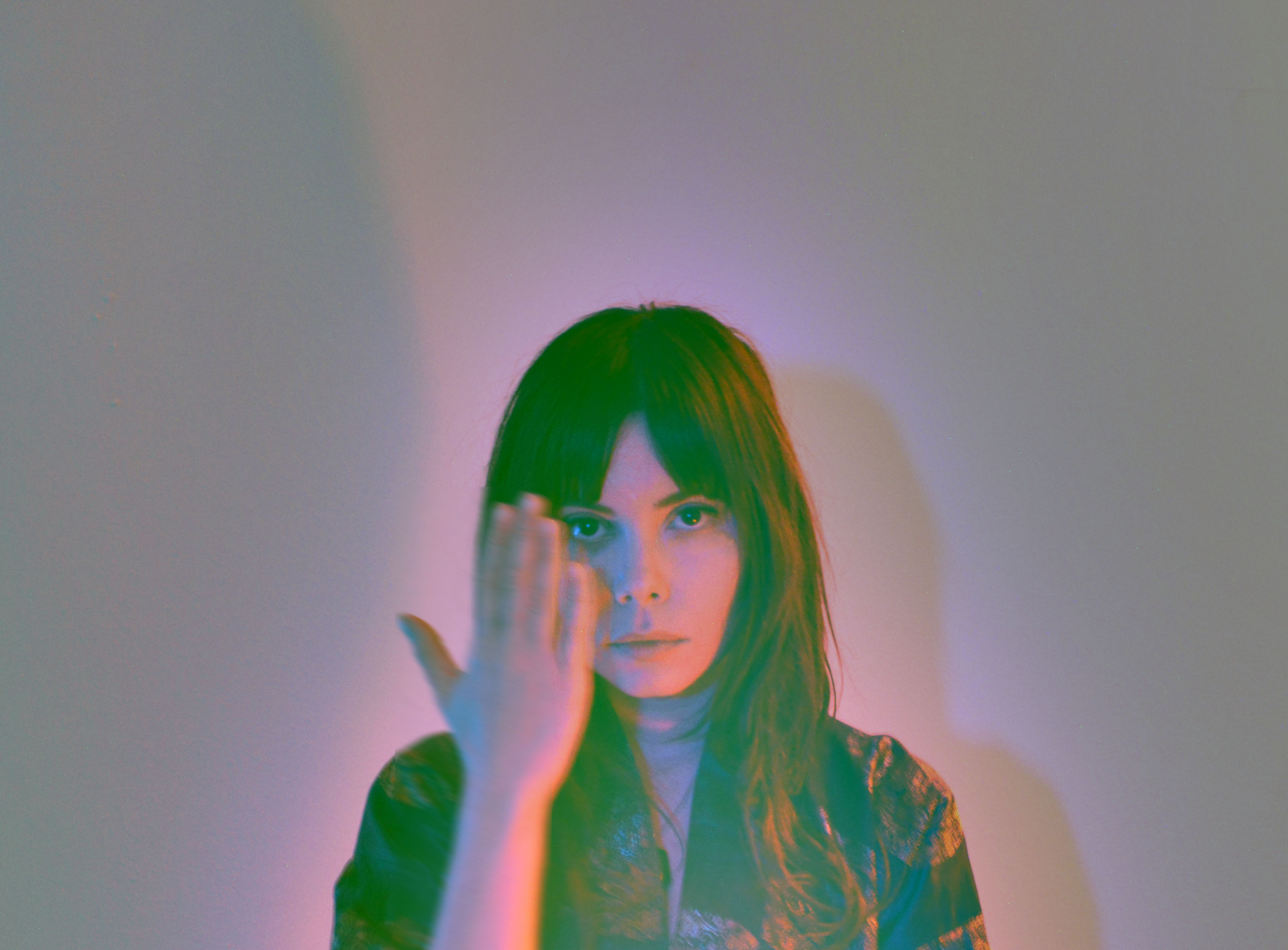
- Anastasia Dimou of Feathers in 2013

Background information
- Origin: Austin, Texas, U.S.
- Genres: Synthpop
- Years active: 2011–2014
- Label: NYX
- Members: Anastasia Dimou
- Past members: Courtney Voss; Kathleen Carmichael; Christine Aprile; Drew Citron; Alex Gehring; Jordan Johns; Jon Minor; Destiny Montague

Feathers is the music project of Anastasia Dimou, formed in 2011 in Austin, Texas. The band's lineup has included Courtney Voss, Kathleen Carmichael, Christine Aprile, Drew Citron, Alex Gehring, Jordan Johns, Jon Minor, Destiny Montague, and Su Swann.

== History ==
Dimou began recording and performing under the moniker Feathers in 2011, following a move to Austin, Texas from her home state of New York. The band has supported Depeche Mode, Washed Out, The Duke Spirit, Robyn, Little Boots, Gary Numan, Trust, Blouse, and played several festivals, including All Tomorrow's Parties, Fun Fun Fun Fest, Austin Psych Fest, Field Day, SXSW Music Festival, and The Great Escape Festival.

Feathers' debut studio album, If All Now Here, was released on May 28, 2013. Mixed by Steven DePalo (Cold Cave, Voxtrot) and mastered by Howie Weinberg, the album also features two songs produced by Brian Foote (Zola Jesus, Lotus Plaza).

Feathers was featured as The Guardian's New Band of the Day on January 28, 2013.

The Los Angeles Times cited Feathers as the discovery of SXSW 2013 along with Autre Ne Veut, stating, "It was impressive, and not just because the songs had hooks, but because they managed to create a sense of mystery."

Feathers was hand-selected by Depeche Mode to open for the band at both SXSW 2013 and for select dates on the band's 2014 European tour.

Their track "Dark Matter" was featured on Radio Mirror Park in Grand Theft Auto V, released on September 17, 2013.

== Discography ==
=== Albums ===
- If All Now Here (2013)
- Only One EP (2014)

=== Singles ===
- "Land of the Innocent" (2013)
- "Soft" (2014)

=== Music Videos ===
- Land of the Innocent (2013) on YouTube.com
- Soft (2013) on YouTube.com
