= If All Now Here =

Studio album by Feathers
- Released: May 28, 2013
- Genre: Electronic, synthpop, indietronica
- Length: 39:12
- Label: Nyx

Singles from If All Now Here
- 1. "Land of the Innocent" Released: March 4, 2013; 2. "Soft" Released: March 5, 2013

If All Now Here is the debut full-length album from the American electronic/synthpop act Feathers. It was released in CD and digital formats on May 28, 2013.

== Release ==
"Land of the Innocent" is the first single taken to promote If All Now Here. It was initially released as a stream through the act's social media outlets in 2012, and later as a digital single on March 4, 2013. The single's b-side is a remix of the song by the Liverpool-based act Outfit. The Guardian wrote that the song "neatly expresses Feathers' desire to combine a dystopian future-world aesthetic with a pop sensibility and rhythms tough enough to pass muster in the realm of the industrial." The music video for the song was directed by Allie Avital Tsypin, known for her work with School of Seven Bells and Marnie Stern, over two days in 108 degree heat outside of Austin, Texas. The video premiered February 1, 2013 on UK blog The Line of Best Fit, and was Bust Magazine's Video of the Day on February 8, 2013.

== Reception ==
Advance reviews of If All Now Here have been strongly positive, with Bust Magazine giving it a 4/5 rating.

Clash Magazine named Feathers "One to Watch," adding "‘If All Now Here’ has an epic atmosphere, thriving on huge moments, lavish textures and massive choruses."

UK blog The VPME gave it a 9/10 rating, noting "if like us you like dark, intelligent pop music with an undercurrent of mystical eastern allure performed by, let’s face it, a band who would give Cleopatra a run for her money, then Feathers are the band for you. Definitely an early album of the year contender!"

"Anastasia Dimou delivers tunes that are melodic, mysterious and often mesmerising"- NME

"This is music designed to overpower and enthral. Sonically, it’s extremely impressive, and almost every song sounds massive." - thisisfakeDIY.co.uk

== Track listing ==
All tracks are written by Feathers.

No.	Title	Length
1.	"Land of the Innocent"	4:18
2.	"Soft"	3:57
3.	"Dark Matter"	3:57
4.	"Night Seances"	3:39
5.	"Familiar So Strange"	3:32
6.	"Fire In The Night"	3:15
7.	"Believe"	3:54
8.	"Dream Song"	3:37
9.	"Leaves Start Trembling"	3:50
10.	"Welcome Possession"	5:12
Total length:		39:12
