= I Was There When... =

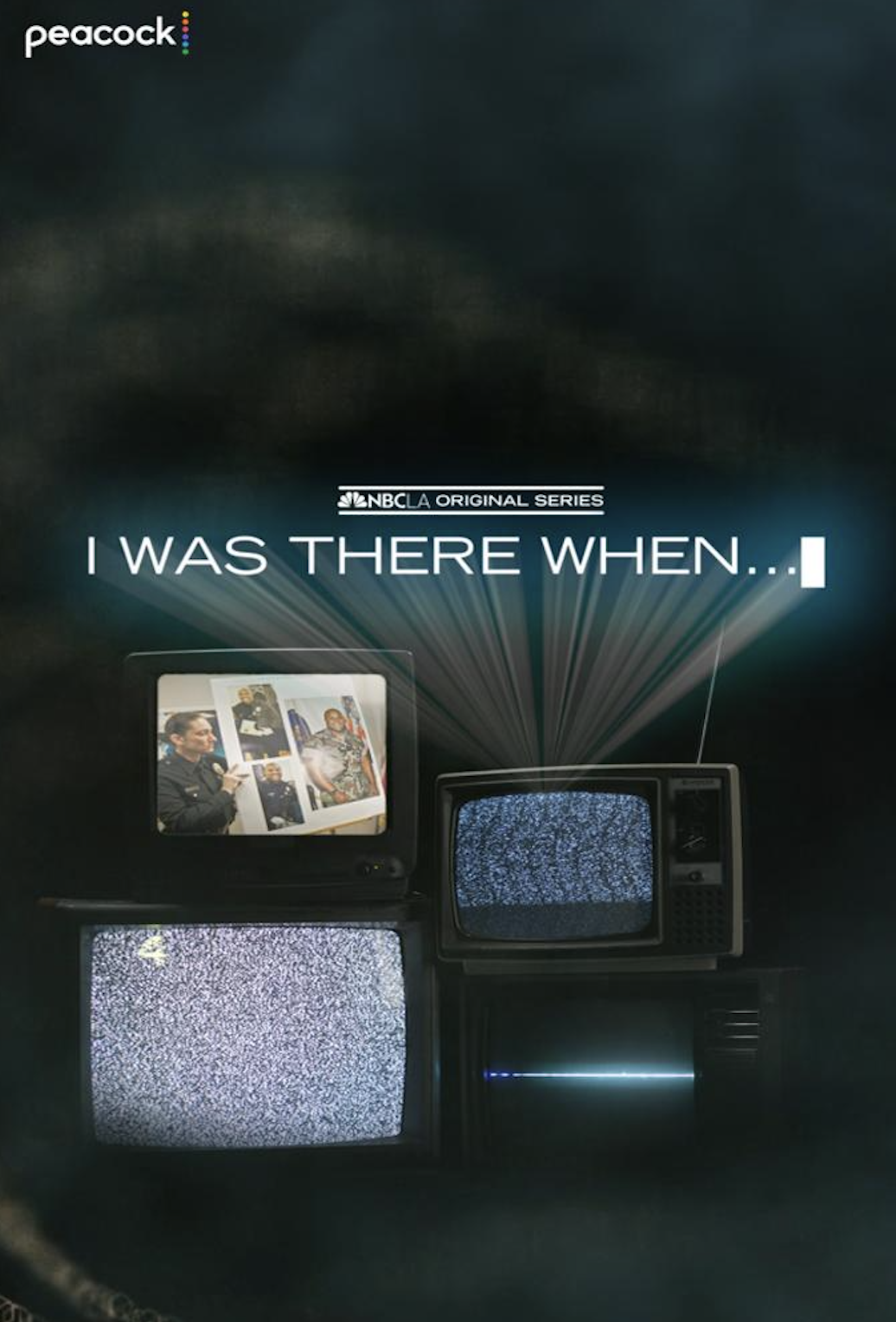
- Title card
- Genre: Documentary
- Directed by: Matthew Arias
- Starring: Fred Roggin; Colleen Williams; Vikki Vargas; Chuck Henry; Patrick Healy; Beverly White; Conan Nolan
- Country of origin: United States
- Original language: English
- No. of seasons: 1
- No. of episodes: 7

Production
- Executive producer: Howie Deeter
- Producer: Yvonne Guevara
- Cinematography: Fernando Torres
- Editor: Matthew Arias
- Running time: 15–22 minutes
- Production companies: NBCUniversal; Peacock

Original release
- Network: Peacock
- Release: February 21, 2022

I Was There When... is an American documentary series directed and edited by Matthew Arias and executive produced by Howie Deeter. It follows several KNBC journalists reliving some of the most profound days of their careers out on the job from the Murder trial of O. J. Simpson to the Atlanta Olympics bombing. The journalists give a glimpse of how it feels to be on the front lines of globally significant events and how they were personally affected.

The seven-part series first aired on Peacock from February 21, 2022. It won an Emmy Award in 2023.

== Episodes ==
No.	Title	Directed by	Original release date
1	"OJ Simpson Pursuit"	Matthew Arias	February 21, 2022
2	"Northridge Earthquake"	Matthew Arias	February 21, 2022
3	"North Hollywood Bank Shootout"	Matthew Arias	February 21, 2022
4	"Atlanta Olympic Games Bombing"	Matthew Arias	February 21, 2022
5	"Wildfire Escape"	Matthew Arias	February 21, 2022
6	"The Death of Prince"	Matthew Arias	February 21, 2022
7	"The Death of Kobe"	Matthew Arias	February 21, 2022

== Reception ==
Upon its initial release, the series received wide acclaim, especially among the television news community. The series was nominated and awarded an Emmy in Los Angeles on July 22, 2023, for the "Informational Series (more than 50% studio)" category.
