= As Plantas Que Curam =

Studio album by Boogarins
- Released: 2013
- Recorded: 2013
- Genre: Psychedelic rock
- Length: 31:53
- Label: Other Music
- Producer: Boogarins

Professional ratings
Review scores
Source	Rating
Allmusic	4.5/5 stars
Pitchfork	7.1/10

As Plantas Que Curam is the debut album by Brazilian psychedelic rock band Boogarins released in 2013.

== Track listing ==
No.	Title	Length
1.	"Lucifernandis"	4:03
2.	"Erre"	3:48
3.	"Infinu"	3:26
4.	"Despreocupar"	2:49
5.	"Hoje Aprendi de Verdade"	4:00
6.	"Fim"	1:59
7.	"Doce"	4:57
8.	"Eu Vou"	2:19
9.	"Canção Perdida"	1:09
10.	"Paul"	3:23

== Personnel ==
Boogarins

- Hans Castro – drums
- Dinho Almeida – vocals and rhythm guitar
- Benke Ferraz – lead guitar
- Raphael Vaz – bass guitar

Additional personnel

- Boogarins – Producer
