= The Black Ryder =

Australian musical duo

- Origin: Sydney, Australia
- Genres: Psychedelic rock, dream pop, space rock, art rock, alternative rock, experimental rock, shoegaze
- Instruments: Vocals, guitar, keyboards, percussion
- Years active: 2007–present
- Label: The Anti-Machine Machine / EMIMusic Australia
- Members: Aimee Nash; Scott Von Ryper
- Website: theblackryder.com

The Black Ryder is songwriting duo Aimee Nash and Scott Von Ryper, who originate from Sydney, Australia.

Their debut album Buy The Ticket, Take The Ride was released through their own label The Anti-Machine Machine / EMI Music Australia on 6 November 2009, and Mexican Summer Records in America on 21 September 2010.

They released their second album, The Door Behind The Door, on 24 February 2015 internationally through The Anti-Machine Machine and The Orchard.

== History ==
The Black Ryder formed in 2007 by founding members Aimee Nash and Scott Von Ryper after their exit from The Morning After Girls.

Whilst the duo play the majority of instruments on their recordings they also feature guest players on recordings and in their live shows. Contributors and guests have included members from The Brian Jonestown massacre, Black Rebel Motorcycle Club, Cat Power, The Church, and Swervedriver.

The band have released two albums to date:

=== Buy the Ticket, Take the Ride ===
Released in 2009, their self-produced debut was included in Rolling Stone (Australia) Best Albums of 2010 and earned them a nomination as Best New Artist. The album featured many guest players, including Ricky Maymi from The Brian Jonestown Massacre, and Peter Hayes and Leah Shapiro from Black Rebel Motorcycle Club.

=== The Door Behind the Door ===
Released in 2015 the album was again self-produced and drew international critical acclaim, notably from Rolling Stone, Stereogum, Interview Magazine, Entertainment Weekly and Noisey.

=== Touring ===
The Black Ryder have played/toured with The Jesus & Mary Chain, The Cult, Black Rebel Motorcycle Club, Primal Scream, The Brian Jonestown Massacre, The Black Angels, The Charlatans, Pete Kember (Spectrum), Broken Social Scene, The Raveonettes and Tamaryn.

In 2009, The Black Ryder made their live debut opening for Black Rebel Motorcycle Club on their Australian tour followed by subsequent Australian tours with The Brian Jonestown Massacre, The Charlatans, and The Raveonettes.

In May 2010 the band supported The Cult on their Love Live Australian tour and continued touring in the US with The Cult after relocating to Los Angeles in September 2010.

In 2011 The Black Ryder performed at Noise Pop Festival, 2011 Clean Air Clear Stars Festival (Pappy & Harriet's); as well as shows with Broken Social Scene, Pete Kember (Spectrum) and Tamaryn.

In 2012, the band were invited to perform at SXSW (Austin, Texas). In 2013, the band played at Austin Psych Fest. They also joined Primal Scream, and The Black Angels on their west coast shows.

In September 2014, The Black Ryder were invited to play at George Fest: A night to Celebrate the Music of George Harrison where they performed their version of George Harrison's Isn't It A Pity. Recorded and filmed at The Fonda Theater in Los Angeles, the concert and DVD also featured artists such as Brian Wilson, Norah Jones, Brandon Flowers, Conan O Brien, Ben Harper, Dhani Harrison, Ian Astbury, Perry Farrell and many more.

In 2015 the band played their own headline shows in the US and UK in support of their second album release The Door Behind The Door and joined The Jesus & Mary Chain on their 30th Anniversary tour of Psycho Candy in America.

They also performed at 'Levitation' (Austin Psych Fest) where they were noted by Noisey as being one of the festival highlights.

=== Collaborations ===
Guest artists and players have included:

- Ricky Maymi The Brian Jonestown Massacre
- Leah Shapiro Black Rebel Motorcycle Club
- Peter Hayes Black Rebel Motorcycle Club
- Gregg Foreman Cat Power / Pink Mountaintops
- Hayden Scott Brody Dalle / Awolnation
- Graham Bonnar Swervedriver / The Brian Jonestown Massacre
- Jules Ferrari The Dolly Rocker Movement / Songs
- Malia James Dum Dum Girls
- Luke O'Farrell The Laurels
- Kate Wilson The Laurels / The Holy Soul
- Adam Edwards Wolf & Cub

Several of The Black Ryder's musical works include scores for Australian Jewelry designers MANIAMANIA. The films for 'The Third Mind' collection (featuring Abbey Lee Kershaw) were launched on the New York Times website, as well as other high fashion + lifestyle sites.

=== Personal life ===
Nash married Ian Astbury, the singer of The Cult, in a Las Vegas ceremony in May 2012.

Nash and Von Ryper are currently based in Los Angeles.

== Discography ==
=== Albums ===
- Buy The Ticket, Take The Ride – 6 November 2009 (The Anti-Machine Machine / EMI Music Australia / Mexican Summer)
- The Door Behind the Door – 24 February 2015 (The Anti-Machine Machine)

=== Film and television ===
Sweet Come Down was featured in 2014 major motion picture Son of a Gun starring Ewan McGregor.

All That We See was featured in the end of Episode 7 / Season 7 of House M.D. "A Pox on Our House" in 2010.

Nash appeared as guest vocals on the Black Rebel Motorcycle Club track Done All Wrong which was featured in the Twilight Saga: New Moon soundtrack in 2009.

Grass – HBO show Damages (an Emmy and Golden Globe-award-winning show) in 2009.

=== Videos ===
- "Sweet Come Down" – Taken from the album Buy The Ticket, Take The Ride; Directed by Michael Spiccia
- "Let Me Be Your Light" – Taken from the album The Door Behind the Door; Directed by Juan Azulay

=== Compilation albums ===
- George Fest: A night to Celebrate the Music of George Harrison (BMG Recorded Music/Hot Records) Release Date: 26 February 2015
- Son of a Gun – Motion Picture Soundtrack Release date 2015
- Live from Nowhere near you – Vol 2 Release date 2011
- Coastal Chill (EMI Records) Release date 2010
- Let It Go and Rise – Burn Your Fingers on the Sun (Darkland Recordings / Off the Hip – Australia) Release Date: 1 January 2008
- Let It Go – Dead Bees Record Sampler # 6 (Dead Bees records – France) Release Date: 1 May 2007
- Let It Go – Turn on Your Mind (Psilocybin Sounds – UK) Release Date: 1 March 2007
