= Hundred Visions =

American rock band

- Origin: Austin, Texas, United States
- Genres: Garage rock, psychedelic rock, punk rock, post-punk
- Years active: 2010-2017
- Labels: Burger Records; Pau Wau Records; Slammammals Records
- Past members: Ben Maddox; Wes Turner; Eric Loftis
- Website: Official Website

Hundred Visions was an American three piece rock band from Austin, Texas formed in 2010. The band has released a number of 7 inches as well as two full-length albums, SPITE, released on Pau Wau Records in 2014, and Permanent Basement, released on Slammammals Records in 2012. Their third full-length album, Brutal Pueblo was released in January 2017.

Hundred Visions played Levitation (Austin Psych Fest), Fun Fun Fun Fest, SXSW, and CMJ. The band also toured with American Sharks, White Denim, and Okkervil River.

Since disbanding, frontman Ben Maddox has gone into the elearning industry.

== Members ==
- Ben Maddox - vocals, guitar
- Wes Turner - bass
- Eric Loftis - drums

== Discography ==
- Permanent Basement, 2012, Slammammals Records
- Spite, October 28, 2014, Pau Wau Records
- Brutal Pueblo, 2017, Burger Records
