= Boogarins =

Psychedelic rock Brazilian band

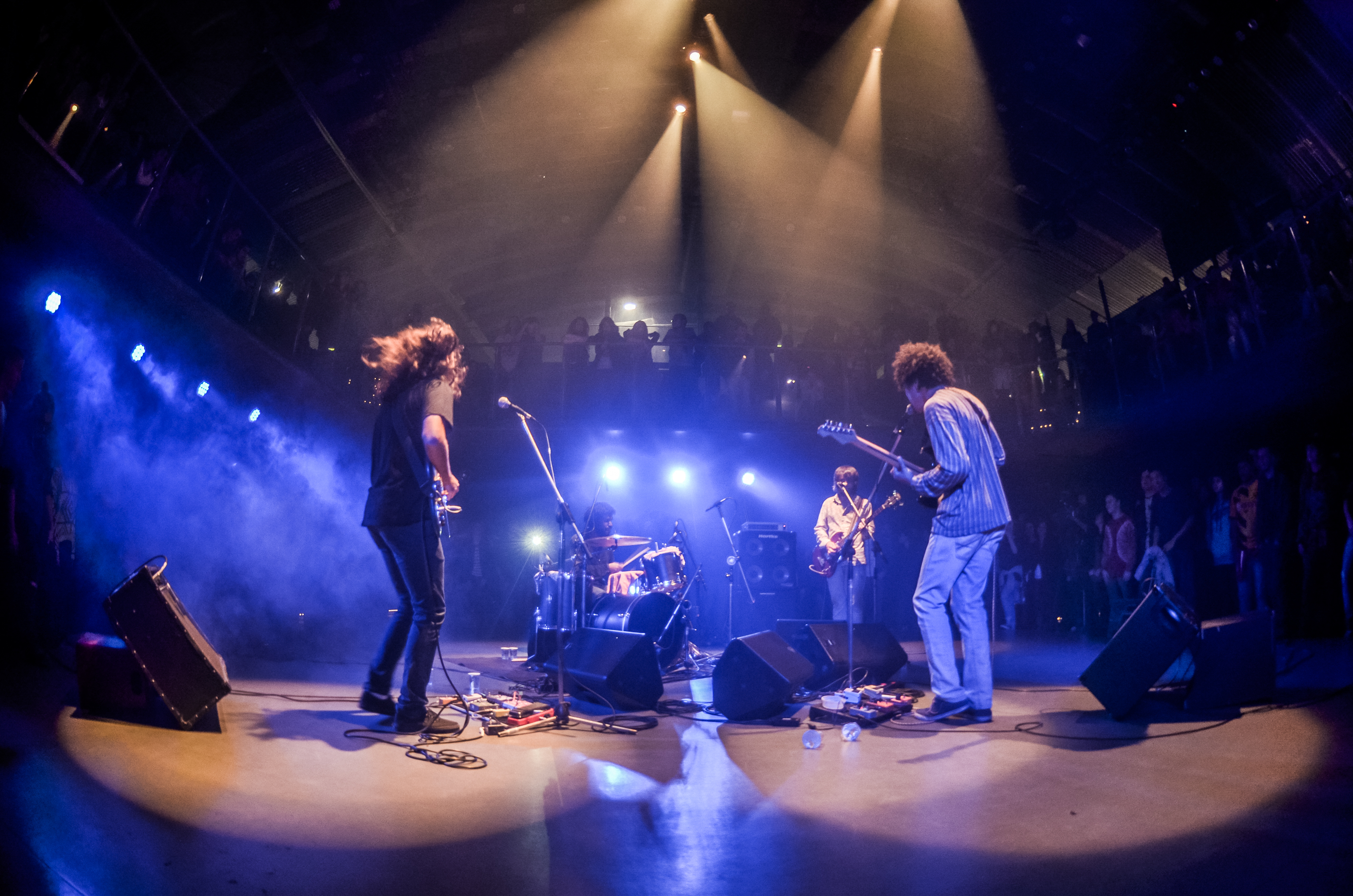
- Show Boogarins CCSP 2015

Background information
- Origin: Goiânia, Brazil
- Genres: Psychedelic rock, indie rock
- Years active: 2012–present
- Members: Dinho Almeida; Benke Ferraz; Raphael Vaz; Ynaiã Benthroldo
- Past members: Hans Castro

Boogarins is a Brazilian alternative rock band formed in 2012, in Goiânia, by members Fernando "Dinho" Almeida (vocals and rhythm guitar) and Benke Ferraz (lead guitar). Hans Castro (drums) and Raphael Vaz (bass) later joined to complete the quartet. In 2014, Ynaiã Benthroldo replaced Hans on drums. The band have performed at a variety of international festivals, such as Rock in Rio Lisboa, Primavera Sound, Porão do Rock, Coquetel molotov, Coachella Valley Music and Arts Festival, Lollapalooza, and South by Southwest.

== History ==
Boogarins was formed by Benke and Dinho, two childhood friends who got together and recorded an EP at home (As Plantas Que Curam) while they were still at school. After signing a contract with Other Music, they released their debut album, also titled As Plantas Que Curam, in 2013.

After the LP's release, the band toured and performed at more than 70 shows across Europe, the United States, and Latin America, playing at festivals such as South by Southwest, Primavera Sound, and Lollapalooza in São Paulo.

After the long tour, the band recorded their 2015 album, Manual, ou Guia Livre de Dissolução dos Sonhos, in Spain. The album was released that October to CD, vinyl and streaming platforms. It would be nominated for the 2016 Latin Grammy Award for Best Portuguese Language Rock or Alternative Album.

In 2016, the band participated in Rock in Rio Lisboa and Levitation, as well as playing on Seattle's influential alternative radio station KEXP.

The band released a live album in 2017 called Desvio Onírico, composed of four improvised tracks of around 10 minutes each recorded during their US and European tours. In June of the same year, the band surprise-released their new studio LP, Lá Vem a Morte, on YouTube. The work was named the ninth best Brazilian album of 2017 by Rolling Stone Brasil.

In 2019, they released their fourth full-length album, Sombrou Dúvida, which was recorded in Austin, Texas. The São Paulo Association of Art Critics included it among the 25 best Brazilian albums of the first half of 2019.

Over the following two years, the band released two compilations of additional material from the Lá Vem a Morte and Sombrou Dúvida recording sessions, both named Manchaca for the road on which their studio was located.

Their album Bacuri was included in the list of 50 best albums of 2024 by the São Paulo Art Critics Association.

== Band members ==
=== Current members ===
- Dinho Almeida – lead vocals, rhythm guitar (2012–present)
- Benke Ferraz – lead guitar (2012–present)
- Raphael Vaz – bass guitar, synthesizers (2013–present)
- Ynaiã Benthroldo – drums, percussion (2014–present)

=== Former members ===
- Hans Castro – drums, percussion (2013–2014)

== Discography ==
=== Studio albums ===
- As Plantas Que Curam (2013)
- Manual ou Guia Livre de Dissolução dos Sonhos (2015)
- Lá Vem a Morte (2017)
- Sombrou Dúvida (2019)
- Bacuri (2024)

=== Compilation albums ===
- Manchaca Vol. 1: A Compilation of Boogarins Memories, Dreams, Demos and Outtakes from Austin, TX (2020)
- Manchaca Vol. 2: A Compilation of Boogarins Memories, Dreams, Demos and Outtakes from Austin, TX (2021)

=== EPs ===
- As Plantas Que Curam (2013)

=== Singles ===
- 2013: Lucifernandes
- 2013: Doce
- 2013: Despreocupar
- 2014: Erre
- 2015: Avalanche
- 2015: 6000 Dias (ou Mantra dos 20 Anos)
- 2016: Benzin
- 2016: Tempo
- 2016: Elogio à Instituição do Cinismo/Olhos
- 2017: Foimal
- 2017: Corredor Polonês
- 2018: LVCO 4
- 2019: Sombra ou Dúvida
