= Matthew Arias =

Los Angeles-based musician and film editor

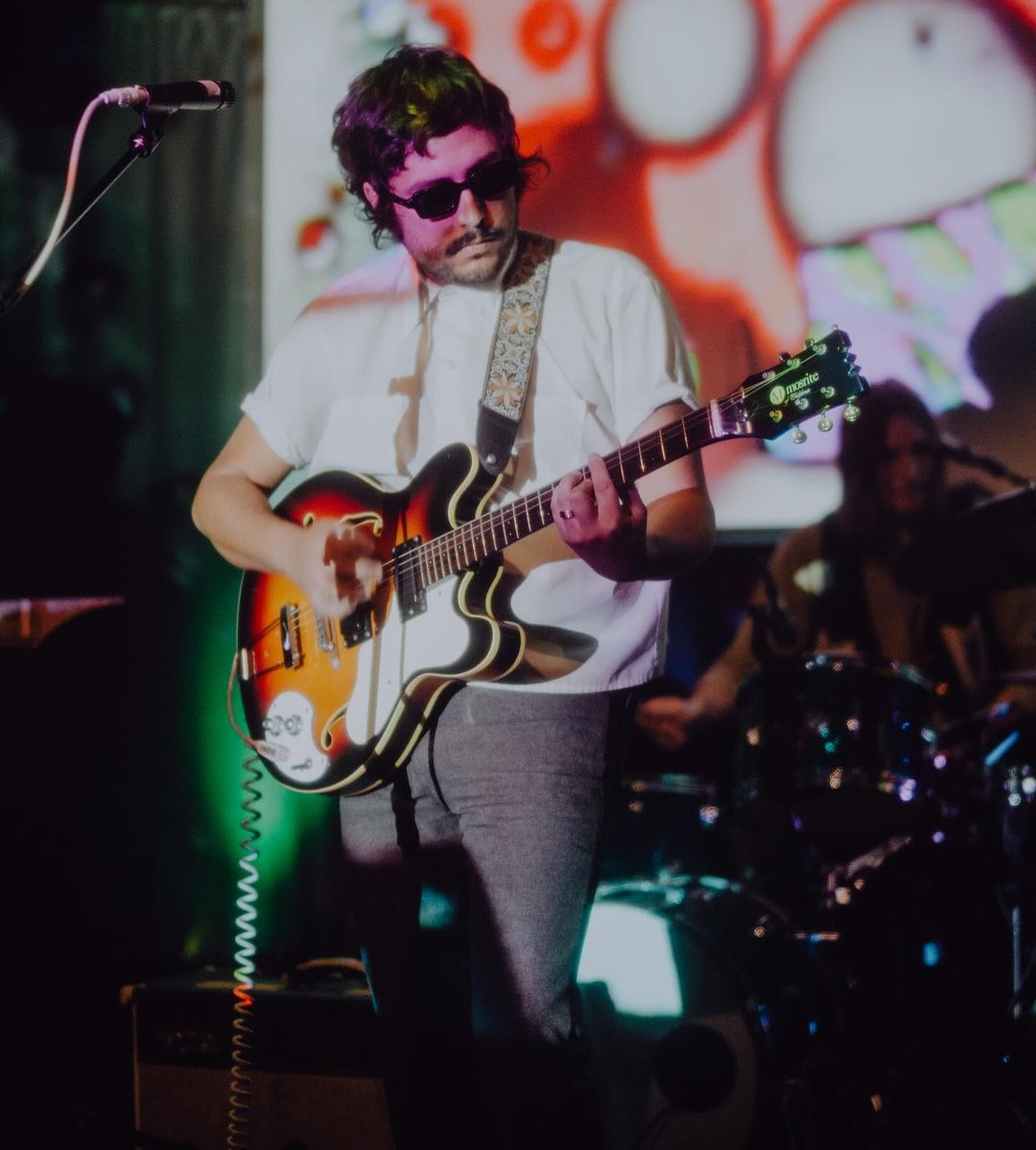
- Arias in Los Angeles (2024)

Background information
- Also known as: Matteo
- Born: Matthew Anthony Arias; February 11, 1991 (age 35); Monterey County, California
- Origin: Los Angeles, California, United States
- Occupations: Musician; film editor
- Years active: 2009–present
- Labels: The Reverberation Appreciation Society, SoftDrive Records
- Member of: Windows
- Formerly of: Golden Animals; Mystic Braves; Vox Waves; Slow White
- Website: https://matthewarias.net

Matthew Arias also known by his stage name Matteo (born February 11, 1991) is an American musician and film editor. Arias was born in Monterey County, California, in 1991 but spent most his childhood in the Los Angeles suburb of Claremont.

== Music ==
Arias has toured the US multiple times and collaborated with brands such as Urban Outfitters and American Apparel. Past bands include Golden Animals, Mystic Braves, Vox Waves and Slow White. Arias joined Vox Waves in 2012 and the band signed to singer Scott Weiland's label, SoftDrive Records, but due to circumstances surrounding Weiland's death the band never released their debut album. In 2016, Arias joined the band Golden Animals (The Reverberation Appreciation Society) and remained a member until 2018. From 2017 to 2020, Arias toured on bass with Los Angeles band Mystic Braves during their international tours through the US and Europe. In 2018 Arias started his own group Windows who released their first singles in summer of 2020. In February 2023 the band released two additional studio singles.

== Film and television ==
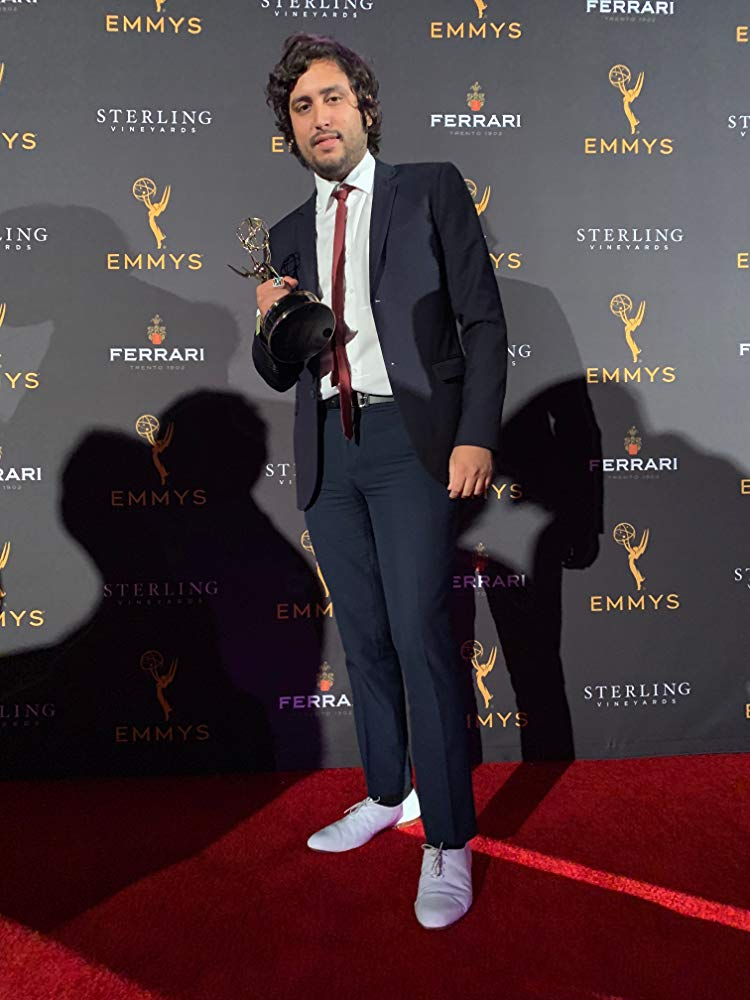
Arias at Saban Media Center with Emmy (2017)

Arias began working in the film and TV industry in 2011, when he started editing Spanish language television programs at Estrella TV and later switching to the English market with a break at Fuse TV. In 2015 he began as a freelance editor for NBC Universal. He has been Emmy nominated several times and has won three Emmy's respectively in 2017, 2019 & 2023 for his work editing in-depth investigative journalism with NBC. In 2023 the Peacock docu-series "I Was There When..." Directed and edited by Arias won an Emmy in its category. In addition, he has been nominated for – and received – multiple Golden Mike Awards and a Humane Society Genesis Award in 2019 for his work in the news industry. He is an active member of the Academy of Television Arts & Sciences.
