= Myth of a Man =

2019 studio album by Night Beats

Studio album by Night Beats
- Released: January 18, 2019
- Length: 32:38
- Label: Heavenly Recordings

Night Beats chronology
Who Sold My Generation (2016)	Myth of a Man (2019)	Outlaw R&B (2021)

Professional ratings
Aggregate scores
Source	Rating
Metacritic	70/100
Review scores
Source	Rating
AllMusic	3.5/5 stars
Exclaim!	7/10
Under the Radar	3.5/10

Myth of a Man is the fourth studio album by American band Night Beats. It was released on January 18, 2019 through Heavenly Recordings.

== Track listing ==
No.	Title	Length
1.	"Her Cold Cold Heart"	3:07
2.	"One Thing"	3:26
3.	"Stand With Me"	3:50
4.	"There She Goes"	3:32
5.	"(Am I Just) Wasting My Time"	3:01
6.	"Eyes on Me"	2:54
7.	"Let Me Guess"	2:30
8.	"Footprints"	3:17
9.	"I Wonder"	3:26
10.	"Too Young to Pray"	3:35
