= Mystic Braves =

American psychedelic rock band

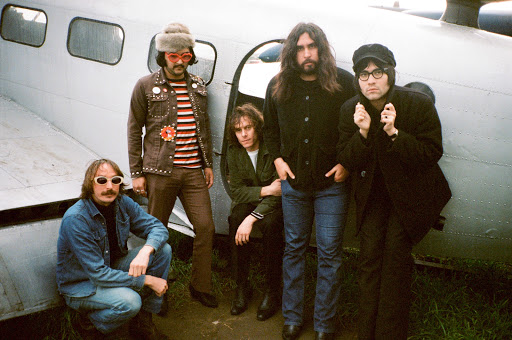
- Mystic Braves in Boyle Heights, California

Background information
- Origin: Los Angeles, California, United States
- Genres: Psychedelic rock
- Years active: 2011–present
- Labels: Lolipop Records; Burger Records
- Members: Julian Ducatenzeiler; Mikey Whiteside; Shane Stotsenberg; Ignacio Gonzales
- Past members: Cameron Gartung; Tony Malacara; Dan Solis; Matteo Arias

The Mystic Braves is an American psychedelic rock band, formed by Julian Ducatenzeiler and Tony Malacara in 2011 and based in Los Angeles. The band cites the Seeds, the Zombies, the Beatles, Ultimate Spinach, along with garage rock and surf rock as influences.

== History ==
Mystic Braves was founded in 2011 under the name Blackfeet Braves by friends Julian Ducatenzeiler, Dan Solis and Tony Malacara when they started going to shows together in the Los Angeles area. The three later met Shane Stotsenberg and Cameron Gartung after a show in Venice. The band put its debut self-titled record out in 2013 and continued gaining popularity in the Southern California music scene, which led to Mystic Braves opening for the English rock band the Zombies. Organ player and co-founder of Lolipop Records Ignacio Gonzales eventually joined the band and they gained momentum in Los Angeles and abroad, especially in the garage rock and psychedelic revival scenes.

In 2014, the band issued their sophomore album, Desert Island, which was released on Lolipop Records. Blackfeet Braves were then sued by Lynyrd Skynyrd's former drummer, Rickey Medlocke, who has a band called Blackfoot, leading them to rebrand themselves as the Mystic Rabbits, after one of their earlier songs, to eventually settling on a mix of the two names, Mystic Braves. The band enjoyed international success with the release of Desert Island, and toured the US and Europe several times over the next two years.

In 2015, the band's third release, Days of Yesteryear, was produced by Rob Campanella in his Echo Park studio.

In 2018, the band released The Great Unknown, produced by Kyle Mullarky at his studio in Topanga Canyon, California and at Lolipop Records' new studio/compound in East Los Angeles.

In 2022, their fifth album, Pacific Afterglow, was released.

== Members ==
=== Current ===
- Julian Ducantenzeiler – lead vocals, guitar (2011–present)
- Shane Stotsenburg – guitar, backing vocals (2011–present)
- Ignacio Gonzales – bass, organ, guitar, vocals, tambourine (2013–present)

=== Former ===
- Cameron Gartung – drums, percussion, electronics (2012–2020)
- Tony Malacara – vocals, bass (2011–2019; injured)
- Dan Solis – drums (2011–2012)
- Matteo Arias – bass (2017–2020)

== Discography ==
=== Albums ===
Mystic Braves	Not On Label	LPOP167	2013
Desert Island	Lolipop Records, Burger Records	LPOP090	2014
Days of Yesteryear	Lolipop Records	LPOP105	2015
The Great Unknown	Lolipop Records	LPOP313	2018
Pacific Afterglow		LP	2022
