= Odd Modern =

US musical group

Odd Modern is an American indietronica band from Pasadena, California, United States. Formed in 2006, Odd Modern is composed of vocalist/keyboardist Vanina Alfaro and drummer/vocalist Girardeau Berdin. After meeting on Craigslist, the duo recorded and independently released their first album, Caspian Sea SICK, and their music video for "Rach ENROLL (rach like maninoff)" directed by Viktor Skorikov.

Their later works include The PE EP (2007), Odd Mode EP (2008), Sweet Release EP (2009) and the ungreatful gatsby EP (2011). In 2010, they released their latest album Contrary To Popular Belief. which spawned a video for the title track featuring Steve-O. The video was recently featured on the MuchMusic New.Music.Live program.

"Flapping Mouth" from the Odd Mode EP is used in a promo for Steve-O's Professional Idiot: A Memoir. The band was named one of LA Music Blog's "Top Ten LA Acts You Might Not Know" in 2011.

== Discography ==
=== EPs ===
- The PE EP (2007)
- Odd Mode EP (2008)
- Sweet Release EP (2009)
- the ungreatful gatsby EP (2011)

=== Albums ===
- Caspian Sea SICK (2006)
- Contrary To Popular Belief. (2010)
