= A Million Pieces =

American rock band

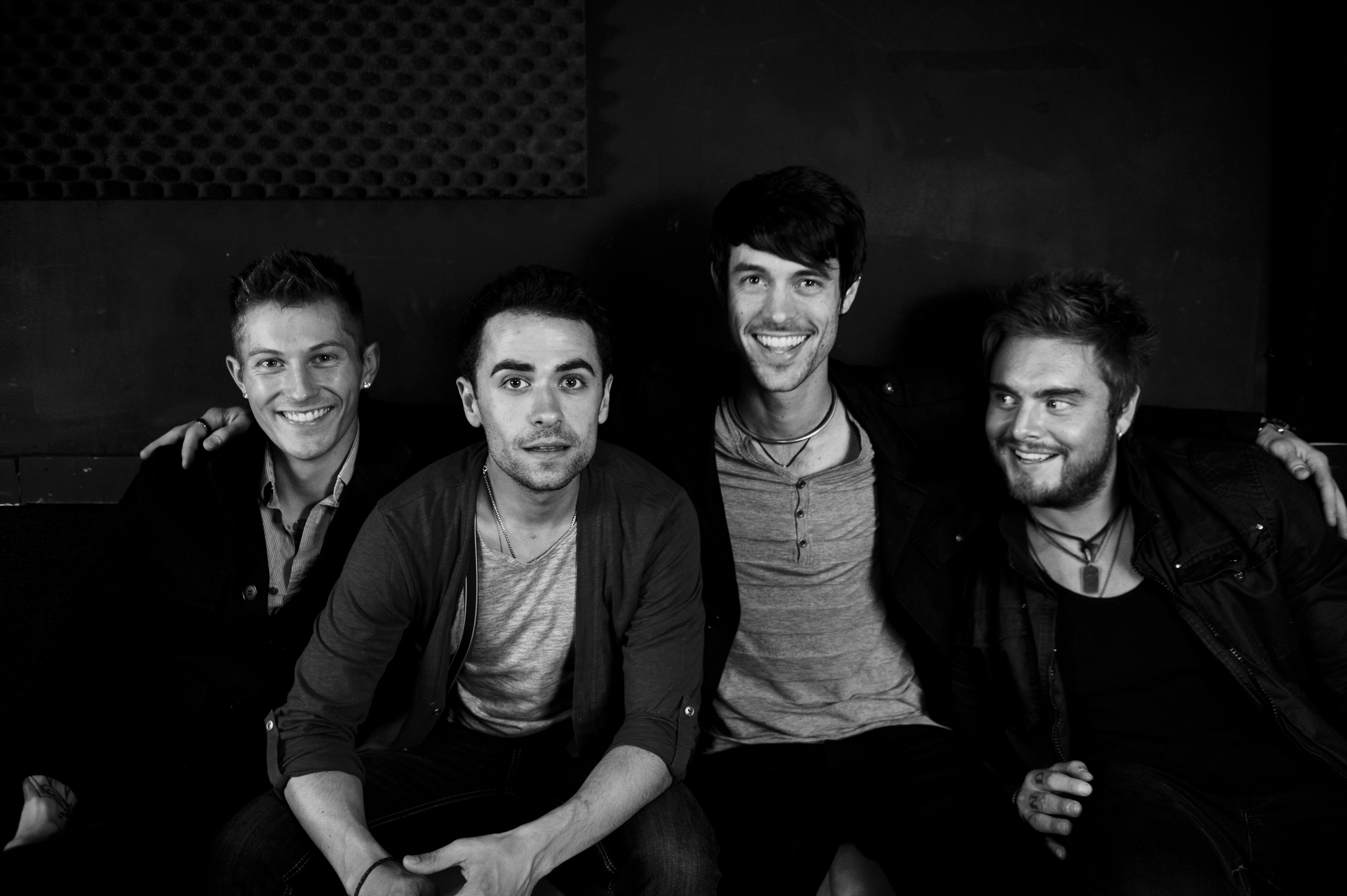

Background information
- Origin: Los Angeles, California, U.S.
- Genres: Pop, rock, electronic, alternative rock
- Years active: 2009–present
- Labels: Unsigned, Scallywag Records
- Members: Graham Fenton; Lucas Gordon; Peter Vanderloos; Brad Crowell
- Website: http://www.amillionpiecesmusic.com

A Million Pieces is an American pop rock band from Los Angeles, California.

The band was founded in 2009 by Peter Vanderloos (guitar, vocals) and consists of frontman Graham Fenton (lead vocals), Lucas Gordon (drums, vocals), and Brad Crowell (bass, vocals).

In late 2011 after parting ways with the band's original lineup, Vanderloos would meet Fenton by chance in a Los Angeles restaurant. Together with Gordon and Crowell, the four collectively are A Million Pieces. A Million Pieces has written two studio releases, A Million Pieces EP in 2011 and Supernatural EP to be released in 2013.

== History ==
=== Formation and debut EP (2009–2011) ===
In 2009 while living in a communal facility in Southern California, Peter Vanderloos would collaborate with original vocalist Morgan Freed to begin writing songs for a pop punk envisioned project; while at the same time settling on the band's name after a lyric inspired the duo coinciding with events in the book A Million Little Pieces. After deciding to become serious with the band, Vanderloos would add original OneRepublic drummer Jerrod 'Skins' Bettis as the group's producer/touring drummer, as well as Stephen Soss, and Ryan Brown to the band's lineup. In the spring of 2011, A Million Pieces would enlist musical arranger and choreographer Printz Board of The Black Eyed Peas to produce and facilitate the release of their debut EP.

During the summer of the same year, A Million Pieces would release a music video for the first single from the EP entitled Laserbeams. Over the next few months Laserbeams would be selected to appear on MTV's Logo Network as part of its NewNowNextPopLab and would win MTVU's 'Freshmen Battle' for the music video to appear on full rotation on the popular college television outlet. Eventually, the videos online presence would travel globally landing a spot on the MTV Asia broadband media site.

However, after a secession of promotional tours across the United States in support of the EP, Vanderloos would decide to part ways with the original group to pursue a more refined pop-rock direction.

=== Addition of Fenton and Supernatural EP (2012 – present) ===
After a brief hiatus at the end of 2011, A Million Pieces announced the addition of frontman Graham Fenton to the band. Vanderloos would meet Fenton after a chance encounter at an LA restaurant where Fenton worked as a singing waiter. On hiatus from his lead role in the Grammy Award-winning Broadway show Jersey Boys (hosted in Las Vegas), Fenton seized the opportunity to front A Million Pieces. The full lineup would fall into place as Lucas Gordon (drums) and Brad Crowell (bass) formed a close friendship with Fenton and Vanderloos in 2012, all sharing early influence from 1980s era rock bands Queen and Genesis.

In November 2012 the band announced through a series of audio clips that they would be releasing a new EP entitled Supernatural pending a January 22, 2013 release date.

In May 2013 the band announced the signing of a Publishing Deal with corporate conglomerate Stampede/Cashmere at Stampede Music Publishing.

== Musical style and influences ==
- A Million Pieces blends a mix of several different genres together including pop, American rock, post-Britpop, Synthpop and show tune music. Band members have stated chief influences in Queen and Genesis as well as various Synthpop groups popular in the 1980s including Hall and Oates and Tears for Fears.
- Fans and critics have compared A Million Pieces to contemporary acts including The Killers, Muse, Maroon 5 and Foster the People.

=== Current members ===
- Graham Fenton- Lead Vocals (2011–present)
- Peter Vanderloos- Guitar, vocals (2009 – present)
- Lucas Gordon- Drums, vocals (2011 – present)
- Brad Crowell- Bass, vocals (2012 – present)

=== Former members ===
- Morgan Freed- Vocals (2009–2011)
- Jerrod Bettis- Drums (2010–2011)
- Stephen Soss- Piano (2010–2011)
- Ryan Brown- Bass (2010–2012)

== Discography ==
- A Million Pieces EP (2011)
- Laserbeams- single version (2011)
- Supernatural EP (Pending 2013)
