= Lyrics of Two =

American band

Lyrics Of Two
- Origin: Los Angeles, California, United States
- Genres: Pop, rock, country
- Occupations: Musician, songwriter, lyricist, composer, sociologist
- Website: http://www.lyricsoftwo.com

Lyrics Of Two is a band from Los Angeles, California, United States. The band was founded by lyricist, songwriter, and sociologist Marie Helen Abramyan, who is also a classically trained pianist. Her training began with her uncle Ashot Abramyan, a notable violinist of the Utah Symphony, after whom the Abramyan String Quartet was founded.

Lyrics Of Two have scored many chart-topping, award-winning songs, and have been recognized as "one of the most innovative and original bands from Los Angeles." Lyrics Of Two have held the #1 spot consecutively on the Deli Music Charts in the category of mainstream pop in Los Angeles and also held the #1 spot for the entire west coast region of the Deli Music Charts for mainstream pop music

== Musical style ==
Lyrics Of Two's musical style has been described as being "delineated from pop and country with a slice of folk alongside Americana." The band's style blends the genres of pop, rock, and country. Lyrics Of Two's sound has been described as offering a "modern spin to an overcrowded industry with... innovative hook and a sophisticated sound in a Millennial dominated field of electronic music." The band has been said to have an approach to music that is "clean, fresh yet arranged in such a mature manner that their music can bear on to almost any demographic."

== Discography ==
Lyrics Of Two have released the following records:

Year	Single	Writer/composer	Genre
2016	"Mysteries"	M. H. Abramyan	Pop/rock
2014	"Your Story"	M. H. Abramyan	Country
2014	"Streetlights Are Spotlights"	M. H. Abramyan	Country
2014	"That's How Life Goes"	M. H. Abramyan	Pop/rock
2014	"Breaking My Heart Was No Accident"	M. H. Abramyan	Country
2014	"Mind Games"	M. H. Abramyan	Pop/rock
2017	"Shut It Down"	M. H. Abramyan	Pop/rock
2016	"I Just Want To Love You"	M. H. Abramyan	Country
2016	"California Loving"	M. H. Abramyan	Pop/country
