= Loomis & the Lust =

American pop rock band

Loomis & the Lust are an independent California pop rock band based out of Santa Barbara. The band is most well known for having filed a copyright infringement lawsuit against singer Jessie J over the song "Domino" in 2012.

== Formation ==
The band was formed by frontman (and namesake) Will Loomis in 2007. The band recorded their first EP Nagasha in 2009 followed by a second EP Space Camp in 2010. After the band's initial success in 2010, guitarist Casey Hooper joined Katy Perry's band and bass player Scott Henson joined the cast of Glee.

== Copyright infringement lawsuit ==
On June 27, 2012 Will Loomis sued English singer Jessie J and her record label Universal Music Group for copyright infringement, alleging that the melody in Jessie J's 2011 song "Domino" was identical to the melody Loomis and the Lust's 2008 song "Bright Red Chords". Loomis lost the suit, with Judge Richard Clifton ruling "Nothing in the record shows the requisite nexus between Hooper and the 'Domino' songwriters except for Loomis’ own speculation."

== Awards and reception ==
Loomis and the Lust won the top prize at the "Artist on the Verge" contest gaining them a feature in Billboard Magazine put on by OurStage.com and the New Music Seminar.

Loomis & the Lust's song "Bright Red Chords" won MTVu's “Freshman” music video award and the band wrote a tour blog for MTV Iggy on MTV Iggy. In 2010 the band worked with live music producer Tom Jackson, and Prince guitar player Dez Dickerson as part of their Artist on the Verge award and filmed a live blog of the experience for MTV Iggy.

E-magazine Blurt Online said the following of the band, "Loomis & the Lust, as the quartet in question is known, is a smart, lean and energetic band of twenty-somethings who look backwards through the lens of classic pop and rock while retaining a contemporary sound that steers blessedly clear of the dull guitar murk that passes for rock in the post-grunge era and vaults well past the sound-alike mediocrity of indie-rock's ever-expanding purgatory."

== Discography ==
The band released its debut EP in 2009, entitled Nagasha. Their second EP, Space Camp, was released on August 10, 2010. In April 2012 Loomis and the Lust reformed and released a 3rd EP "Sports Suck", along with videos for their singles "My Fix" and "Sports Suck". On March 30, 2013 Will Loomis released the album The Nobody.
