= Night Beats =

American psychedelic/garage rock band

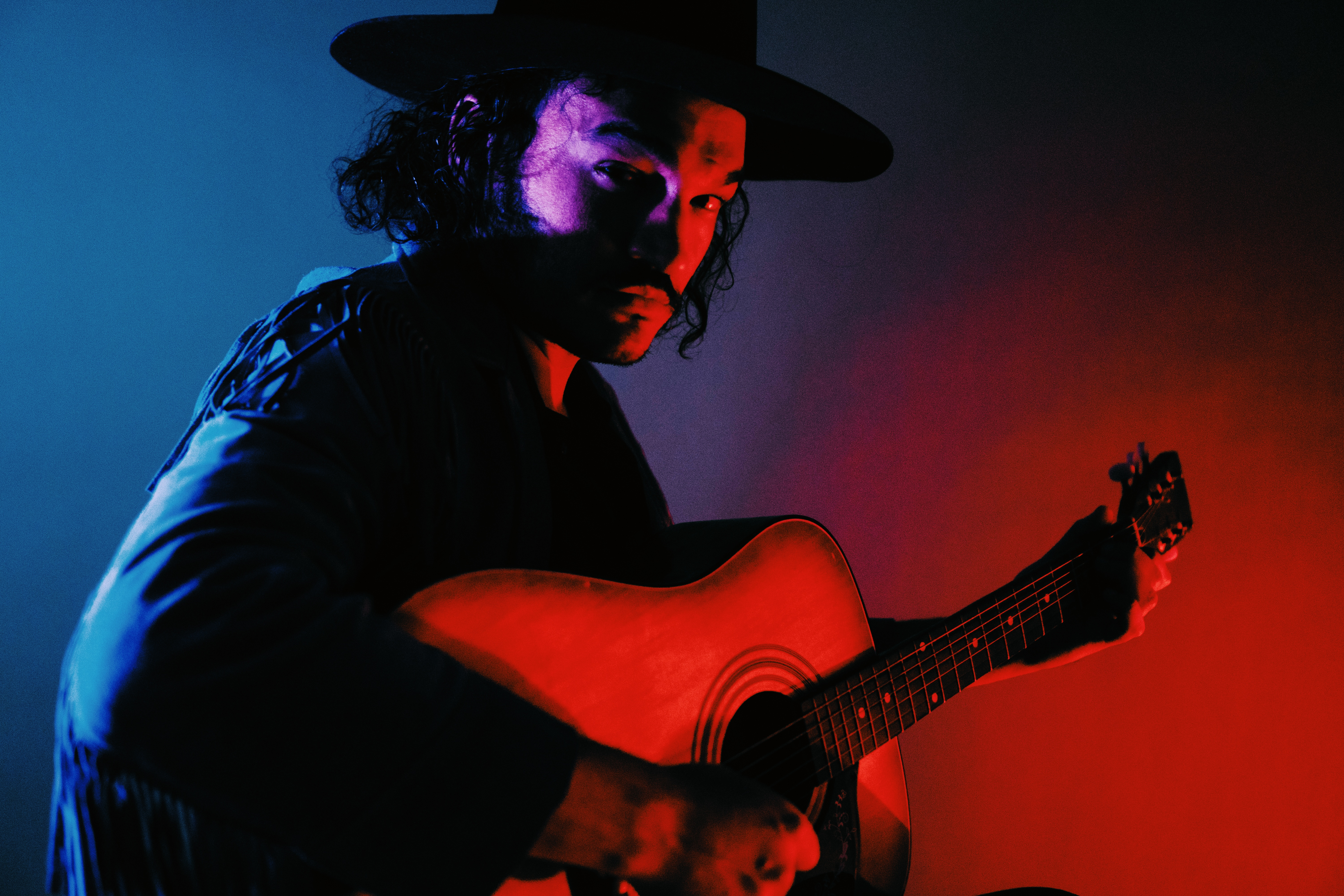

Background information
- Origin: Seattle, Washington, United States
- Genres: Garage rock, psychedelic rock, soul, surf rock
- Years active: 2009 — present
- Labels: Fuzz Club, Cooking Vinyl, Heavenly Recordings; Trouble In Mind; The Reverberation Appreciation Society
- Members: Danny "Lee Blackwell" Rajan Billingsley
- Past members: Tarek Wegner; James Traeger; Jakob Bowden; Evan Snyder; Sam Thorne
- Website: thenightbeats.us

Night Beats are an American psychedelic/garage rock band, formed in 2009 in Seattle, Washington.

Named after the Sam Cooke album 'Night Beat', the band currently consists of lead singer and guitarist Danny "Lee Blackwell" Rajan Billingsley as the only permanent member. Founding member drummer James Traeger has only played intermittently with the band since 2016, original bassist Tarek Wegner left in 2014 and his replacement, Jakob Bowden, left the band sometime in early-mid 2018.

== History ==
After beginning a musical career at 15, Danny Lee Rajan "Blackwell" Billingsley began recording as Night Beats when he moved to Seattle from his hometown of Dallas, TX.

Night Beats toured extensively early on, completing multiple North American tours during 2010 and were signed within weeks of self-releasing the H-Bomb EP. Picked up by Chicago's Trouble in Mind Records (Ty Segall, Fresh and Only's, Hex Dispensers, etc.). The re-release of the EP topped several college radio charts competing with other Artists' full-length efforts. (September 6, 2010)

On June 28, 2011 the band released their self-titled debut album via Trouble In Mind. They also released a split EP with The UFO Club on the Austin label The Reverberation Appreciation Society. A split single with TRMRS was released in June 2012 via Volcom Vinyl Club.

On September 24, 2013, the band released their second album "Sonic Bloom" via The Reverberation Appreciation Society. They toured North America, Europe, Israel, South Africa and Australia in support of the album.

In 2015, the band signed to London-based label Heavenly Recordings and released their third album "Who Sold My Generation" in January 2016. The album featured Black Rebel Motorcycle Club member Robert Levon Been on bass, who also co-produced the album.

On January 28, 2019, the band released their fourth album Myth Of A Man. The album was recorded by Billingsley with producer and Black Keys frontman Dan Auerbach. For the sessions, Billingsley was backed by a cast of old time session musicians who had worked with the likes of Elvis Presley and Aretha Franklin.

Later that year, on June 21, 2019, studio album: Night Beats Perform The Sonics 'Boom' was released.

Then in late 2020, Blackwell signed Night Beats to Fuzz Club Records. Outlaw R&B, the next Night Beats studio album was released on June 4, 2021. A live album, Levitation Sessions, was released via The Reverberation Appreciation Society in August 2021.

In 2022, Danny teamed up with Carolina Faruolo (ex-Los Bitchos) to release the Tropicalia influenced album Monte Carlo on the Seattle based Suicide Squeeze Records. He also has a collaborative project called UFO Club, with Christian Bland from the band the Black Angels. [3] Notably, the song "Right/Wrong," was the official song of the Melbourne Queer Film Festival in 2022.

On July 14, 2023, Night Beats released the studio album: Rajan on Suicide Squeeze Records. [4]

In March of 2025, Danny Lee Blackwell made his music video directorial debut, for the new Night Beats single, Behind the Green Door.

== Band members ==
=== Current ===
- Danny "Lee Blackwell" Rajan Billingsley - Vocals, lead guitar

=== Former ===
- Tarek Wegner - Bass
- James Traeger - Drums
- Jakob Bowden - Bass
- Evan Snyder - Drums
- Sam Thorne - Bass

== Discography ==
=== Studio albums ===
- Night Beats - 2011 (Trouble in Mind Records)
- Sonic Bloom - 2013 (The Reverberation Appreciation Society)
- Who Sold My Generation - 2016 (Heavenly Recordings)
- Myth of a Man - 2019 (Heavenly Recordings)
- Outlaw R&B - 2021 (Fuzz Club Records)
- Levitation Sessions (Live album) - 2021 (The Reverberation Appreciation Society)
- Live At Valentine - 2022 (Fuzz Club Records)
- Rajan - 2023 (Suicide Squeeze Records)

=== Singles/Splits/EPs ===
- H-Bomb 7" - 2010 (Self-Released)
- H-Bomb 7" - 2010 (Trouble In Mind Records)
- H-Bomb EP (iTunes) - 2010 (Holy Twist)
- Night Beats/UFO Club Split 10" - 2011 (The Reverberation Appreciation Society)
- Night Beats/TRMRS Split 7" - 2012 (Volcom Entertainment/Resurrection Records)
- Night Beats/ Her Cold Cold Heart - 2018 (Heavenly Recordings / [PIAS])
- Night Beats/ Behind the Green Door - 2025 (Suicide Squeeze Records)

=== Compilations ===
- Get Wyld! Vol. 1 - 2010 (Holy Twist)
- Portable Shrines Magic Sound Theatre Vol. 1 - 2011 (Translinguistic Other/Light In The Attic)
- Sailor Jerry Vol. 4 - 2011 (Sailor Jerry Rum)
