= Studded Left =

American band

Studded Left/Indian Jewelry
- Origin: Houston
- Genres: Noise rock, experimental, electronic
- Years active: 2002–present
- Labels: The Reverberation Appreciation Society; We Are Free; Monitor; Girlgang Records; Lovepump United; Tigerbeat6
- Members: Erika Thrasher; Tex Kerschen; Mary Sharpe; Richard Durham
- Past members: Rodney Rodriguez; Brandon Davis
- Website: http://www.studdedleft.com

Studded Left, formerly Indian Jewelry, is an American band led by Houston-based artist Erika Thrasher and writer Tex Kerschen.

The Rhapsody music service page dedicated to the band describes them thus: "Indian Jewelry are classic Lone Star State freaks."

The LA Weekly said of the band: "The most mind-controlling band I ever saw was Indian Jewelry. During a set at the Echo four or five or six years ago, they found some top-secret dial on the back of their synthesizer and slowly started turning up the insanity, pounding away at the same unrelenting riff until a roomful of people was twitching and frothing at the mouth. So you could say I've got high hopes for this appearance at Part Time Punks' anniversary show. These weapons-grade Texan psychedelicists match truly primitive electronics, rhythms like Konono N°1, bleeps and wooshes from some kind of Soviet radar system, etc., to unending slo-mo distorto guitar that fills the room like boiling oil and ghost vocals from the other side. Like all Indian Jewelry releases, new album Peel It demands your total commitment. So hear ... and obey." (Chris Ziegler)

Paul Hanford of Dazed described their place as such: "Indian Jewelry stand at a kind of musical crossroads where the gloriously dark moments of rock n'roll's past hang side by side with clunky rave synths and a droned-out attitude."

Furthermore, much has been made of the band's use of strobe lights in a live context: "Urban tribalists Indian Jewelry come on like a fever dream with leathery, swaggering riffs and strobe lights, leaving you wet on the floor." Craig Hlavaty, Houston Press.

Like other underground music bands and their psychedelic rock predecessors, Indian Jewelry are known for sonic and comic experiments.

Tom Murphy of the Denver Westword said of the band: "The state of Texas has sure given us some interesting and innovative musical figures over the years, including the likes of Roky Erickson, Gibby Haynes and Randy Turner. Erika Thrasher and Brandon Davis are certainly sound pioneers in their own right, and whether performing under the name of Indian Jewelry or one of their myriad other monikers (including the hilariously ghoulish Corpses of Waco), this is one act that doesn’t sit comfortably as a noise band, post-punk outfit, no-wave project, psychedelic rock collective or experimental shoegaze freakout. At the same time, there are elements of all that and more in the group’s mind-bending performances. With song titles that suggest more than a passing familiarity with esoteric knowledge and mysticism, Indian Jewelry will mesmerize you with far more than clever rhetoric."

== History ==
Swarm of Angels was a noise-rock band from Houston, Texas, in the late 1990s and early 2000s. The original lineup was made up of members of competing bands. With the formation of Swarm of Angels, The Fever's Erika Thrasher ended the "Westheimer Street Festival albino-cobra custody" dispute with Japanic's Tex Kerschen. Ralf Armin of the Vulgarians joined Matty & Mossy's Matt Frey and Domokos/A Pink Cloud of Rusted Shut, members of bands competing for the #1 slot on Rice Radio's top 35 charts. This lineup shifted, and led to the formation of what became Indian Jewelry. In early 2016 the band changed their name to Studded Left.

== Partial discography ==
=== Albums ===
- Casual Flexer (Studded Left, Ltd), 2024
- Popular Intuition (Studded Left, Ltd), 2019
- Doing Easy (Studded Left/The Reverberation Appreciation Society), 2015
- Peel It (The Reverberation Appreciation Society)
- Totaled (We Are Free, 2010)
- Free Gold! (We Are Free/Lovepump United, 2008)
- Fake and Cheap (Deleted Art/Girlgang, 2008)
- Invasive Exotics (Monitor Records/Lovepump United, 2006)
- Sangles Redux (Girlgang/Skinny Wolves Records, 2005)

==== As NTX + Electric ====
- We are the Wild Beast (Girlgang, 2003)

==== As Swarm of Angels ====
- Plessure EP 7-inch (Girlgang Records & Tapes, 2002)

=== EPs ===
- Western Groove, maxi-single/micro-album, (Girlgang, 2017)
- Indian Jewelry/Future Blondes split Zing Zang/Heartless 12-inch (Dull Knife, 2008)
- Rattling Death Train, cd-r, (Kimosciotic 2005)
- In Love With Loving 7-inch (ON ON Switch, 2005)
- Indian Jewelry/Sugarbeats split Pentecostal/One Year Real 7-inch (Girlgang, 2005)

==== As Bialystok Players ====
- I Am Donkey Mini CD-R (Girlgang, 2003)

==== As NTX + Erika Thrasher ====
- Chasing the Rats Out 7-inch (Girlgang, 2004)
- Pain Reliever/Titanium split 7-inch (Girlgang, 2002)
