= Marissa Yardley Clifford =

American writer and visual artist

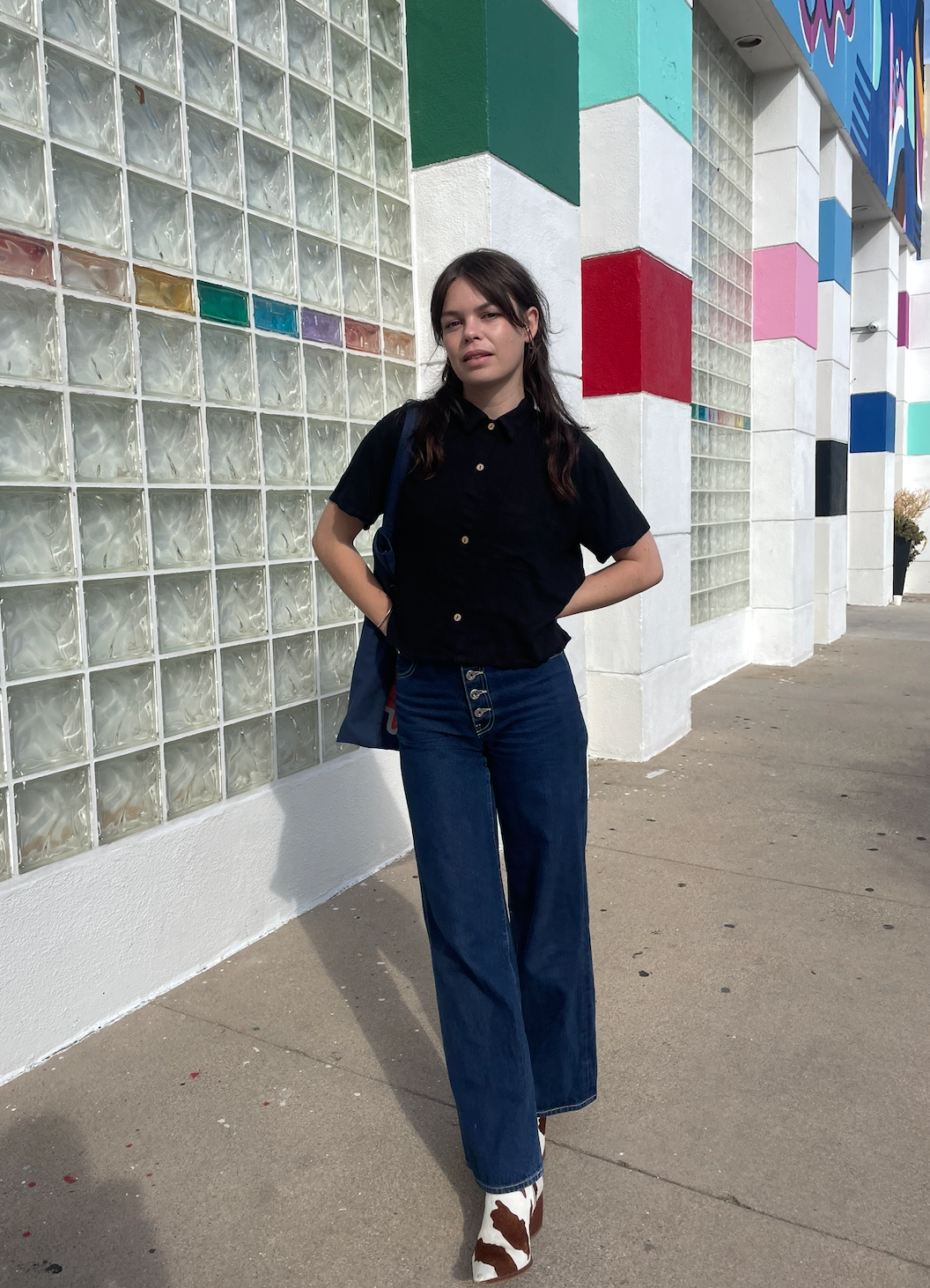
- American writer, actor and artist Marissa Yardley Clifford.
- Born: 1992 (age 33–34); Starkville, Mississippi, U.S.
- Education: UCLA
- Known for: Writing, visual art

Marissa Yardley Clifford (born 1992) is an American writer, visual artist, and actress.

== Early life and education ==
Clifford was born in 1992 in Starkville, Mississippi. She attended UCLA, where she studied art history and digital humanities.

== Writing ==
Clifford began writing in 2006 for a local newspaper. Her work has appeared in publications including Vice and The Culture Trip. She has also contributed to Curbed and has appeared on local news programs discussing topics such as gentrification and the digital divide in MacArthur Park.

Clifford began working in screen-based storytelling through advertising, contributing to projects such as Apple’s Shot on iPhone campaign, including the Damien Chazelle–directed short film Vertical Cinema. She later wrote the feature-length screenplay Zana.

In addition to journalism, Clifford has worked with advertising agencies including Media Arts Lab, 72andSunny, and R/GA. She has contributed to advertising campaigns in collaboration with artists and directors including Damien Chazelle, FKA twigs, and Megadeth. A campaign for Megadeth titled Nature Is Metal was nominated for the Primetime Emmy Award for Outstanding Commercial in 2019.

== Acting ==
Clifford has also worked as an actress in film and television productions. She appeared in the short film Tryouts, which was nominated for a College Television Award.

== Visual art ==
After graduating from UCLA, Clifford joined the Getty Research Institute's Digital Art History team, where she worked as a project manager on the Getty Scholars' Workspace. Her work focuses on the relationship between art, technology, and culture, using media such as video, projection, and painting.

Her collaborative project DH4, created with Victoria Wells, was exhibited at the Getty Center. Her projection work has also been shown at the Hammer Museum and in live performances.
