= The Reverberation Appreciation Society =

American record label

- Founded: 2010
- Genre: Psychedelic
- Country of origin: U.S.
- Location: Austin, Texas
- Official website: levitation-austin.com/the-reverberation-appreciation-society-record-label

The Reverberation Appreciation Society is the creator, curator, and producer of annual psychedelic music festivals Levitation Austin, Levitation France, Levitation Chicago, and Levitation Vancouver. The Reverberation Appreciation Society's record label started in 2010, with the release of Christian Bland and the Revelators – The Lost Album. Later releases include albums by Joel Gion of The Brian Jonestown Massacre, Ringo Deathstarr, Wall of Death, Indian Jewelry, Golden Animals, Night Beats, Holy Wave, and The UFO Club (a collaboration between The Black Angels' Christian Bland and Night Beats' Lee Blackwell), as well as joint releases with Burger Records.

== Roster ==
- Holy Wave
- Ringo Deathstarr
- Christian Bland & the Revelators
- Joel Gion
- Shapes Have Fangs
- Wall of Death
- The UFO Club
- Night Beats
- The Vacant Lots
- Indian Jewelry
- Elephant Stone
- Cosmonauts
- Al Lover
- Chris Catalena
- The Meek
- The Cult of Dom Keller
- Golden Animals

== Discography ==
- RVRB 001 Christian Bland & the Revelators – The Lost Album
- RVRB 002 Shapes Have Fangs – Dinner in the Dark
- RVRB 003 The UFO Club / Night Beats – Split EP
- RVRB 004 Christian Bland and the Revelators – Pig Boat Blues
- RVRB 005 The Meek – Grave
- RVRB 006 The Vacant Lots – High and Low
- RVRB 007 The UFO Club – Self Titled
- RVRB 008 Cosmonauts – Laserbeam
- RVRB 009 Indian Jewelry – Peel It
- RVRB 010 Elephant Stone – Self Titled
- RVRB 011 Holy Wave – Evil Hits
- RVRB 012 Wall of Death – Main Obsession
- RVRB 013 Night Beats – Sonic Bloom
- RVRB 014 The Cult of Dom Keller – The Cult of Dom Keller
- RVRB 015 Golden Animals – Here Eye Go
- RVRB 016 Holy Wave – Relax
- RVRB 017 Joel Gion – Overthrow 7”
- RVRB 018 Joel Gion – Apple Bonkers
- RVRB 019 Christian Bland & The Revelators / Chris Catalena – Split EP
- RVRB 020 Christian Bland and the Revelators – The Unseen Green Obscene
- RVRB 021 Holy Wave – The Evil Has Landed Part II
- RVRB 023 Al Lover – Zodiak Versions
- RVRB 024 Ringo Deathstarr – Pure Mood
- RVRB 025 Indian Jewelry – Doing Easy
- RVRB 026 Holy Wave – Freaks of Nurture
- RVRB 027 Various Artists – A Tribute To Pet Sounds
- RVRB 028 Holy Wave – Adult Fear
- RVRB 033 Frankie & The Witch Fingers - Monsters Eating People Eating Monsters...
- RVRB 037 Osees - Levitation Sessions
- RVRB 044 Fuzz - Levitation Sessions
- RVRB 050 Acid Dad - Take It From The Dead
- RVRB 051 Osees - Levitation Sessions II
- RVRB 052 King Gizzard & the Lizard Wizard - Live At Levitation
- RVRB 064 Psychedelic Porn Crumpets - Levitation Sessions
- RVRB 079 Goat - Levitation Sessions
- RVRB 082 Frankie And The Witch Fingers - Live At Levitation
- RVRB 084 Levitation Room - Strange Weather

== See also ==
- List of record labels
