= Golden Animals =

Multi-talented band

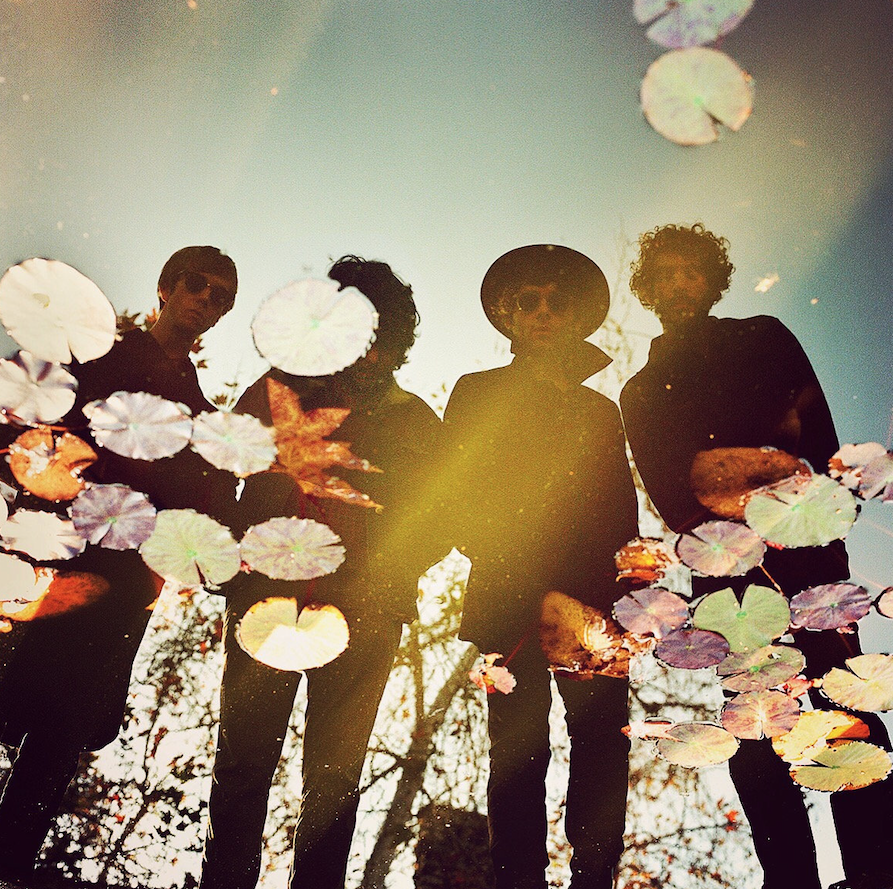

Background information
- Origin: Brooklyn, New York, United States
- Genres: Pop; Rock & Roll; Psychedelic; Folk
- Years active: 2006–present
- Labels: Reverberation Appreciation Society, HappyParts Recordings
- Members: Tommy Eisner; Eyal Lidergot; TJ Tate; Matteo Arias; Justin Smith
- Past members: Linda Beecroft
- Website: goldenanimals.bandcamp.com

Golden Animals is an American pop / rock & roll / psychedelic / blues / folk / country band formed by Tommy Eisner in 2006.

== History ==
The group officially began in 2006 in Brooklyn, New York, when Tommy Eisner met Linda Beecroft on and added her on drums and backing vocals to songs he had been writing, recording and performing solo since 2002. They played for several years and tour internationally in North America, Europe and Africa. In 2014, Eisner and Beecroft decided to take a break from playing together. In the summer of 2016, Eisner moved to Los Angeles to reform the group as a larger ensemble adding Eyal Lidergot (Guitar), TJ Tate (Guitar), Matteo Arias (Bass), and Justin Smith (drums).

== Recordings and tours ==
After a series of home recordings, Golden Animals recorded their first studio EP, Do The Roar! (2007), with Chris Coady at StayGold (part of Headgear Studio in Brooklyn, NY, which was later released by HappyParts Recordings. In 2008, the group released their first LP Free Your Mind And Win A Pony (2008), produced and engineered by Chris Coady at Tiny Telephone Studios, mixed by Thom Monahan and released by HappyParts Recordings. The band's second LP Hear Eye Go (2013) was recorded and co-mixed with Matt Boynton at Vacation Island Recordings and released by The Reverberation Appreciation Society. The band toured nationally with The Black Angels and Roky Erickson in the winter of 2014.
