= Dead Skeletons =

Psychedelic rock trio from Iceland

- Origin: Reykjavík, Iceland
- Genres: Psychedelic rock, dream pop, space rock
- Years active: 2008–present
- Labels: A Records, Too Pure, Sound of Cobra, Fuzz Club Records, Dead Monk Records
- Members: Jón Sæmundur Auðarson (Nonni Dead); Henrik Björnsson; Ryan Carlson Van Kriedt
- Website: www.deadskeletons.com

Dead Skeletons are a psychedelic rock trio from Reykjavík, Iceland, formed in 2008 by Jón Sæmundur Auðarson (a.k.a. Nonni Dead), Henrik Björnsson and Ryan Carlson Van Kriedt.

== History ==
Dead Skeletons formed in 2008 when frontman Auðarson held a show at the Reykjavik Art Museum. He needed music to accompany the installation, so Auðarson, Björnsson (also of Singapore Sling), Ryan Carlson Van Kriedt (Sunsplit, Asteroid #4) and Aislinn Van Kriedt (Sunsplit, Asteroid #4) recorded the song "Dead Mantra", which became an underground hit and landed them a record deal with A Records, who released it as a single on 26 November 2010.

Their debut album, Dead Magick, was released on 11 November 2011, followed by three 2012 releases: the "Om Mani Peme Hung" single in January (by Too Pure), the (Orð) EP on 23 September (by Sound of Cobra) and a two-track single titled Buddha-Christ on 12 December (by Fuzz Club Records). Another two-track single, "Dead Comet", was released in November 2013 by Dead Monk Records.

Dead Skeletons were invited to perform at the All Tomorrow's Parties Iceland festival in June 2013 at Ásbrú, Naval Air Station Keflavik,

Auðarson's longtime HIV-positive status and resulting fear of death are a major influence on the band's ethos. The Guardian commented, "Dead Skeletons' philosophy is based around a psychedelic battle cry and series of mantras to inspire people to accept life and death in equal measure".

== Reception ==
Discussing the video for "Dead Mantra", The Guardian said, "Dead Mantra is pure rock'n'roll magic at play...a visual tour-de-force including imagery of Tibet, skulls and vintage record players".

In a 2011 review of Dead Magick, Julian Marszalek of The Quietus called Dead Skeletons "masters of creating pace and drama", noting the band's penchant for confronting death, saying, "Dead Skeletons' main man Jón Sæmundur Audarson has been living with HIV for almost 20 years and his determination to seize life by the lapels rather than cowering in the shadow of death informs this album throughout".

Andrew Flanagan of NPR praised "Dead Mantra" in 2012, saying, "The sounds and the sentiment line up perpendicularly to each other, carving a space of cognitive dissonance that's at once confusing, comforting and hair-raising".

== Discography ==
Studio albums

- Dead Magick (2011, A Records)

Singles & EPs

- "Dead Mantra" 10" single (2010, A Records)
- "Om Mani Peme Hung" 7" single (2012, Too Pure)
- (Orð) 12" EP (2012, Sound of Cobra/Dead Monk Records)
- Buddha-Christ 12" single (2012, Fuzz Club Records)
- "Dead Comet" 12" single (2012, Dead Monk Records)

Live albums

- "Live in Berlin" (2016, Fuzz Club Records)
