= Death Valley =

Valley in the Mojave Desert, Eastern California

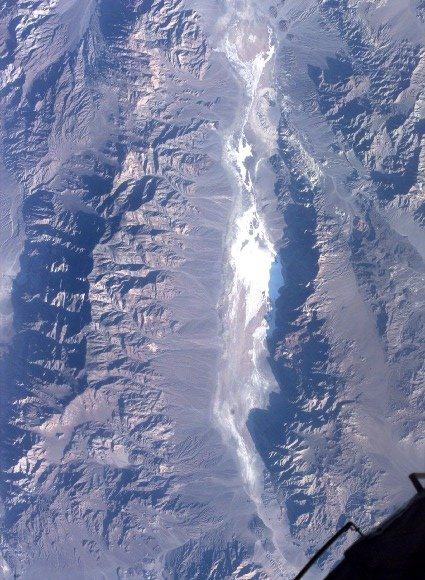
- Death Valley as seen from Space Shuttle Columbia in October 1995

- Location within California
- Floor elevation: −282 ft (−86 m)
- Area: 3,000 square miles (7,800 km^{2})

Naming
- Native name: Panamint: Tümpisa

Geography
- Location: California
- Coordinates: 36°14′49″N 116°49′01″W
- Rivers: Furnace Creek; Amargosa River
- Interactive map of Death Valley

Death Valley (Panamint: Tümpisa [tɨmbiʃa]) is a desert valley in Eastern California, United States, in the northern Mojave Desert, bordering the Great Basin Desert. The World Meteorological Organization lists Death Valley as the site of the hottest surface temperature recorded on Earth.

In the afternoon hours of July 10, 1913, the United States Weather Bureau recorded a temperature of 134 °F (56.7 °C) at Furnace Creek in Death Valley, which stands as the highest ambient air temperature ever recorded on the surface of the Earth. However, this reading and several others taken in that period are disputed by some modern experts due to observer issues and regional disparities in temperature values. The highest reliable temperature in Death Valley is 130 °F (54.4 °C) recorded at Furnace Creek on August 16, 2020 and July 9, 2021. This is still the highest reliable temperature recorded globally.

Lying mostly in Inyo County, California, near the border of California and Nevada, in the Great Basin, east of the Sierra Nevada mountains, Death Valley constitutes much of Death Valley National Park and is the principal feature of the Mojave and Colorado Deserts Biosphere Reserve. It runs from north to south between the Amargosa Range on the east and the Panamint Range on the west. The Grapevine Mountains and the Owlshead Mountains form its northern and southern boundaries, respectively. It has an area of about 3,000 sq mi (7,800 km^{2}). The highest point in Death Valley National Park is Telescope Peak, in the Panamint Range, which has an elevation of 11,043 feet (3,366 m).

Death Valley is home to the Timbisha tribe of Native Americans, formerly known as the Panamint Shoshone. They have inhabited the valley for at least the past millennium. Their name for Death Valley is Tümpisa, meaning "rock paint". This refers to the presence of red ochre in the valley.

The valley got the name Death Valley in the winter of 1849–1850 when a group of American pioneers were traveling through on their way to the California gold rush. The Death Valley '49ers got lost in the valley and feared that they would all perish there. They did eventually make their way out after suffering the loss of just one of the group.

== Geology ==
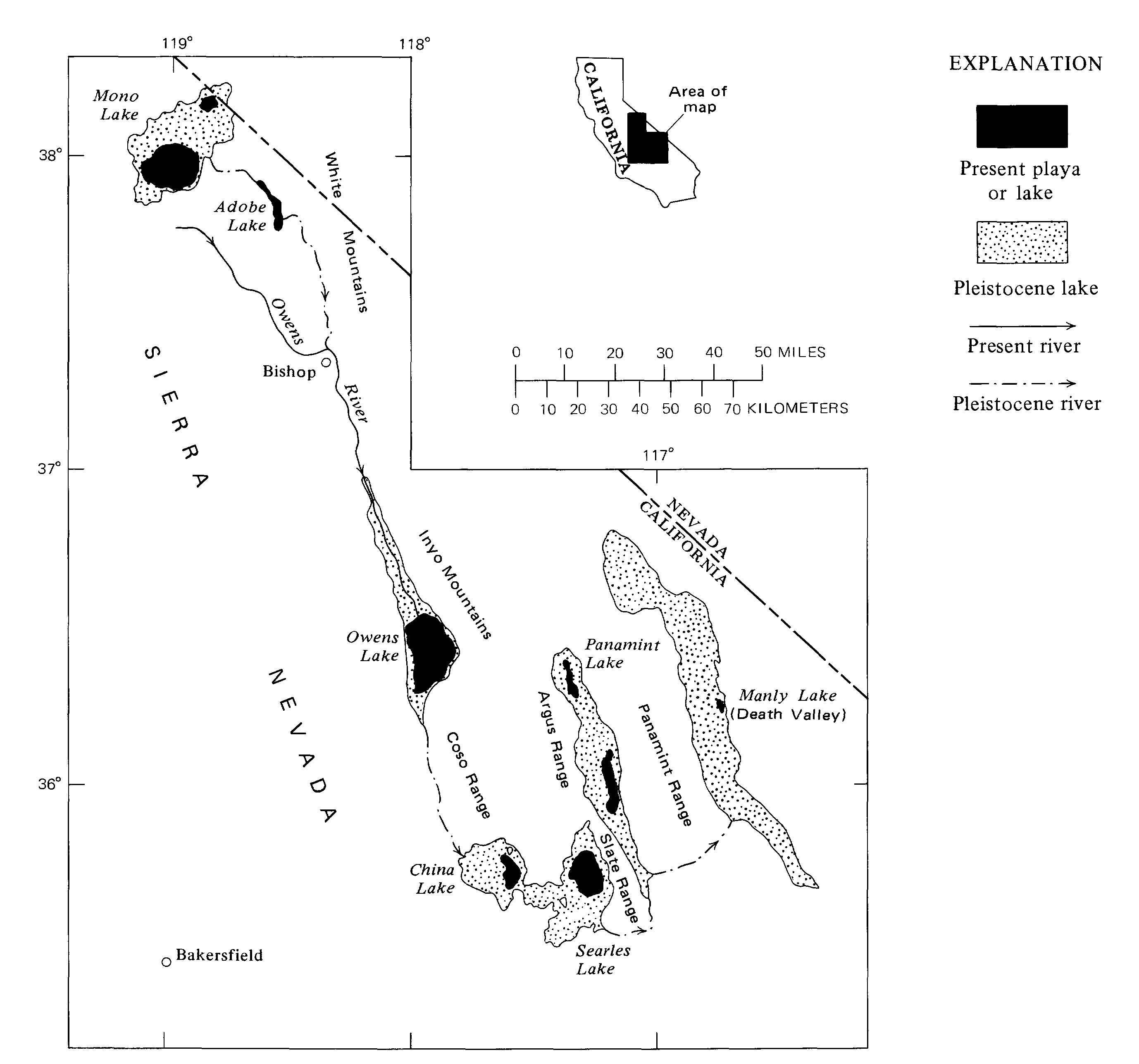
Map showing the system of once-interconnected Pleistocene lakes in eastern California (USGS)

Death Valley is a graben—a downdropped block of land between two mountain ranges. It lies at the southern end of a geological trough, Walker Lane, which runs north to Oregon. The valley is bisected by a right lateral strike slip fault system, comprising the Death Valley Fault and the Furnace Creek Fault. The eastern end of the left lateral Garlock Fault intersects the Death Valley Fault. Furnace Creek and the Amargosa River flow through part of the valley and eventually disappear into the sands of the valley floor.

Death Valley also contains salt pans. According to current geological consensus, at various times during the middle of the Pleistocene era, which ended roughly 10,000–12,000 years ago, an inland lake, Lake Manly, formed in Death Valley. The lake was nearly 100 miles (160 km) long and 600 feet (180 m) deep, the end-basin in a chain of lakes that began with Mono Lake in the north and continued through basins down the Owens River Valley, through Searles and China Lakes and the Panamint Valley, to the immediate west.

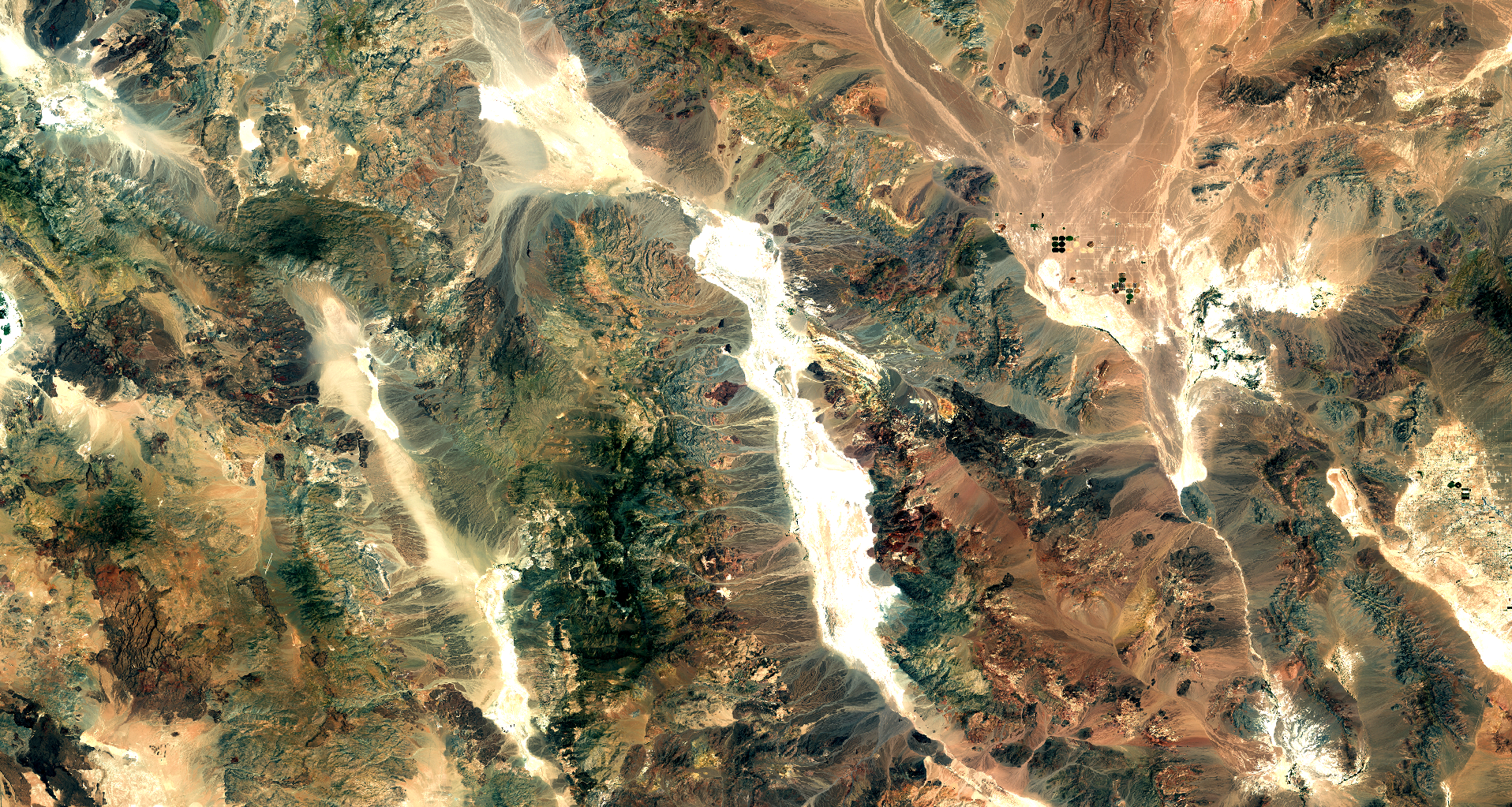
Death Valley, California, July 3, 2017, Sentinel-2 true-color satellite image, scale 1:250,000

As the area turned to desert the water evaporated, leaving an abundance of evaporitic salts, such as common sodium salts and borax, which were later exploited during the modern history of the region, primarily 1883 to 1907.

== Climate ==
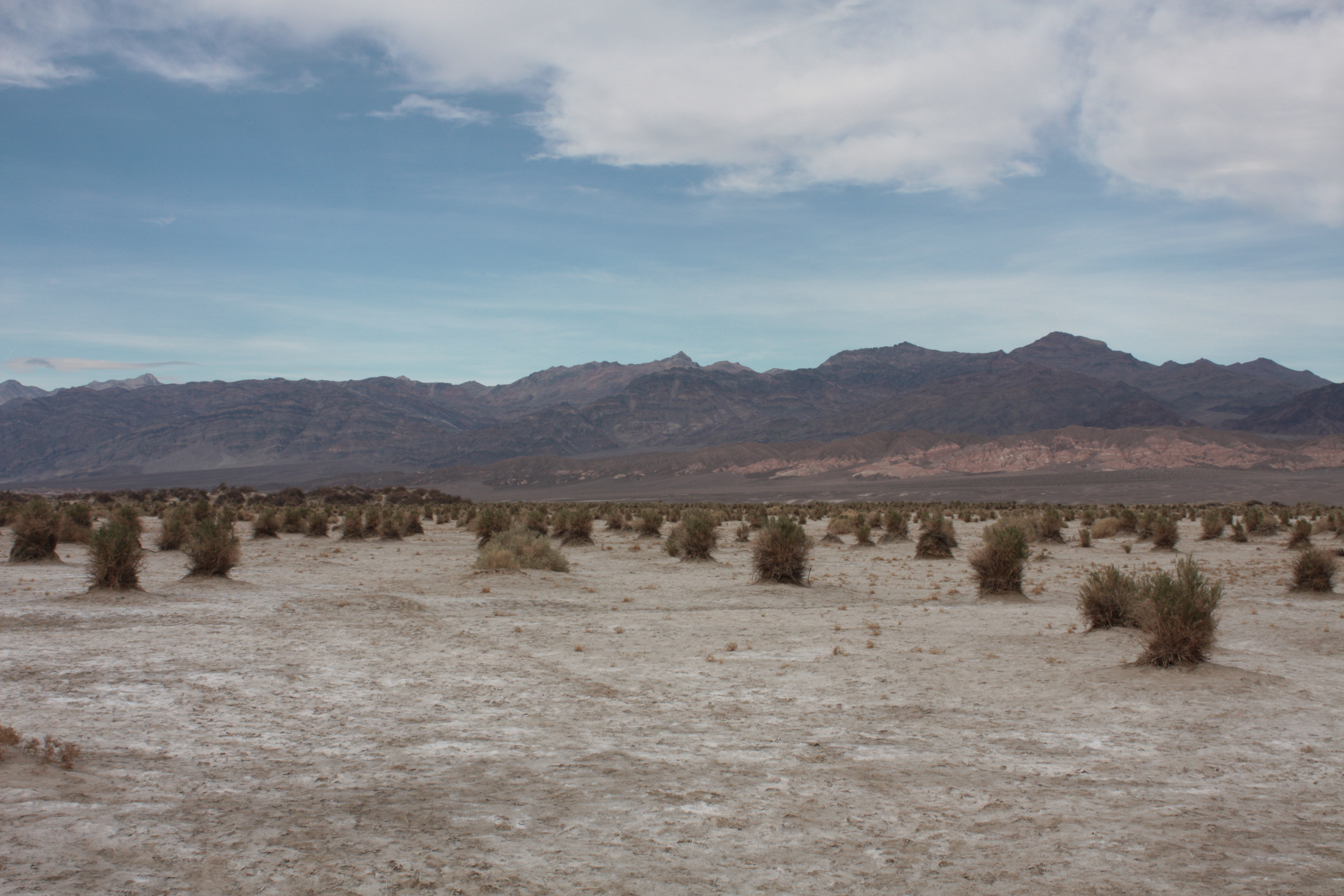
Landscape of Death Valley deserted land

Death Valley has a subtropical, hot desert climate (Köppen: BWh), with long, extremely hot summers; short, warm winters; and little rainfall.

The valley is extremely dry because it lies in the rain shadow of four major mountain ranges (including the Sierra Nevada and Panamint Range). Moisture moving inland from the Pacific Ocean must pass eastward over the mountains to reach Death Valley; as air masses are forced upward by each range, they cool and moisture condenses, to fall as rain or snow on the western slopes. When the air masses reach Death Valley, most of the moisture in the air has already been lost and thus there is little left to fall as precipitation.

The extreme heat of Death Valley is attributable to a confluence of geographic and topographic factors. Scientists have identified a number of key contributors:

- Solar heating - The valley's surface (consisting of soil, rocks, sand, etc.) undergoes intense solar heating because the air is clear and dry, and the land is dark and sparsely vegetated. This is especially noticeable in mid-summer, when the sun is nearly directly overhead.
- Trapping of warm air - Warm air naturally rises and cools; in Death Valley this air is subject to continual reheating as it is trapped by high, steep valley walls and recycled back to the valley floor. Warm air also is trapped by the valley's north–south orientation, which runs perpendicular to prevailing west-to-east winds.
- Migration of warm air from other areas (advection) - Warm desert regions adjacent to Death Valley, especially to the south and east, often heat air before it arrives in Death Valley.
- Warm mountain winds - As winds are forced up and over mountains (e.g. the numerous ranges west of Death Valley), the winds can be warmed in several ways. The resulting dry, warm winds are known as foehn winds. Their warmth can in part be caused by the release of latent heat, which occurs when water vapor condenses into clouds. The extremely low elevation below sea level compresses the air which heats it further.

Severe heat and dryness contribute to perpetual drought-like conditions in Death Valley and prevent much cloud formation from passing through the confines of the valley, where precipitation is often in the form of a virga.

The depth and shape of Death Valley strongly influence its climate. The valley is a long, narrow basin that descends below sea level and is walled by high, steep mountain ranges. The clear, dry air and sparse plant cover allow sunlight to heat the desert surface. Summer nights provide little relief: overnight lows may dip just into the 82 to 98 °F (28 to 37 °C) range. Moving masses of super-heated air blow through the valley, creating extremely high ambient temperatures.

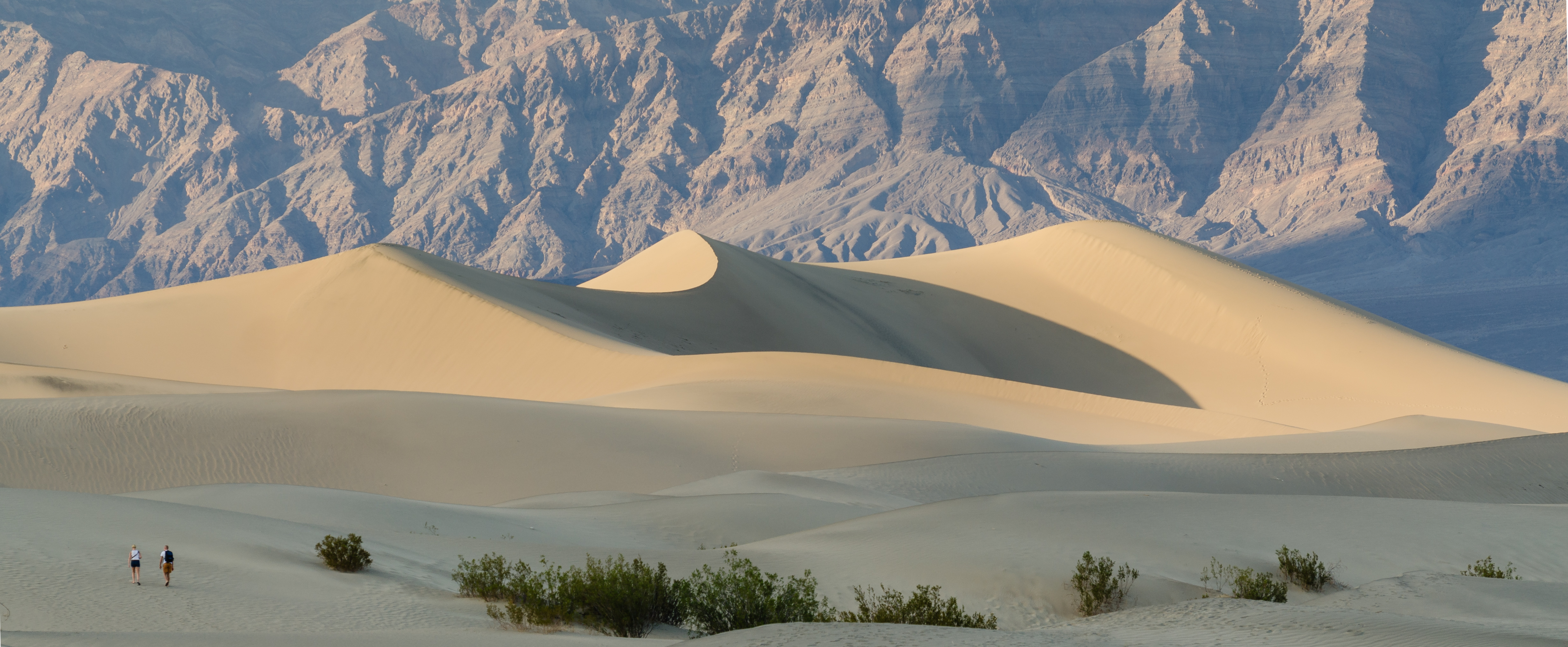
Sand dunes at Mesquite Flats

The hottest air temperature ever recorded in Death Valley was 134 °F (56.7 °C), on July 10, 1913, at Greenland Ranch (now Furnace Creek), which, as of today, is the highest atmospheric temperature ever recorded on the Earth's surface. (A report of a temperature of 58 °C (136 °F) in Libya in 1922 was later determined to be inaccurate.) During the heat wave that peaked with that record, five consecutive days reached 129 °F (54 °C) or higher. However some modern meteorologists now dispute the accuracy of the 1913 temperature measurement due to regional mismatch and observer issues. On June 30, 2013, a reliable extreme temperature of 129.2 °F (54.0 °C) was recorded in Death Valley. The same value was reached at Mitribah, Kuwait tying the (reliable) world record at that time. A temperature of 130 °F (54.4 °C) was recorded at the Furnace Creek weather station on August 16, 2020, this stands as the highest reliable temperature recorded on earth, but has not yet been officially verified by the World Meteorological Organization. The valley again recorded that temperature on July 9, 2021; however, that temperature has not yet been verified by the World Meteorological Organization either. The valley's lowest temperature, recorded at Greenland Ranch (now Furnace Creek) on January 2, 1913, was 15 °F (−9 °C).

The highest surface temperature ever recorded in Death Valley was 201.0 °F (93.9 °C), on July 15, 1972, at Furnace Creek, which is the highest ground surface temperature ever recorded on earth, as well as the only recorded surface temperature of above 200 °F (93.3 °C).

The greatest number of consecutive days with a maximum temperature of at least 100 °F (38 °C) was 154, in the summer of 2001. The summer of 1996 had 40 days over 120 °F (49 °C), and 105 days over 110 °F (43 °C). The summer of 1917 had 52 days when the temperature reached 120 °F (49 °C) or above, 43 of them consecutive.

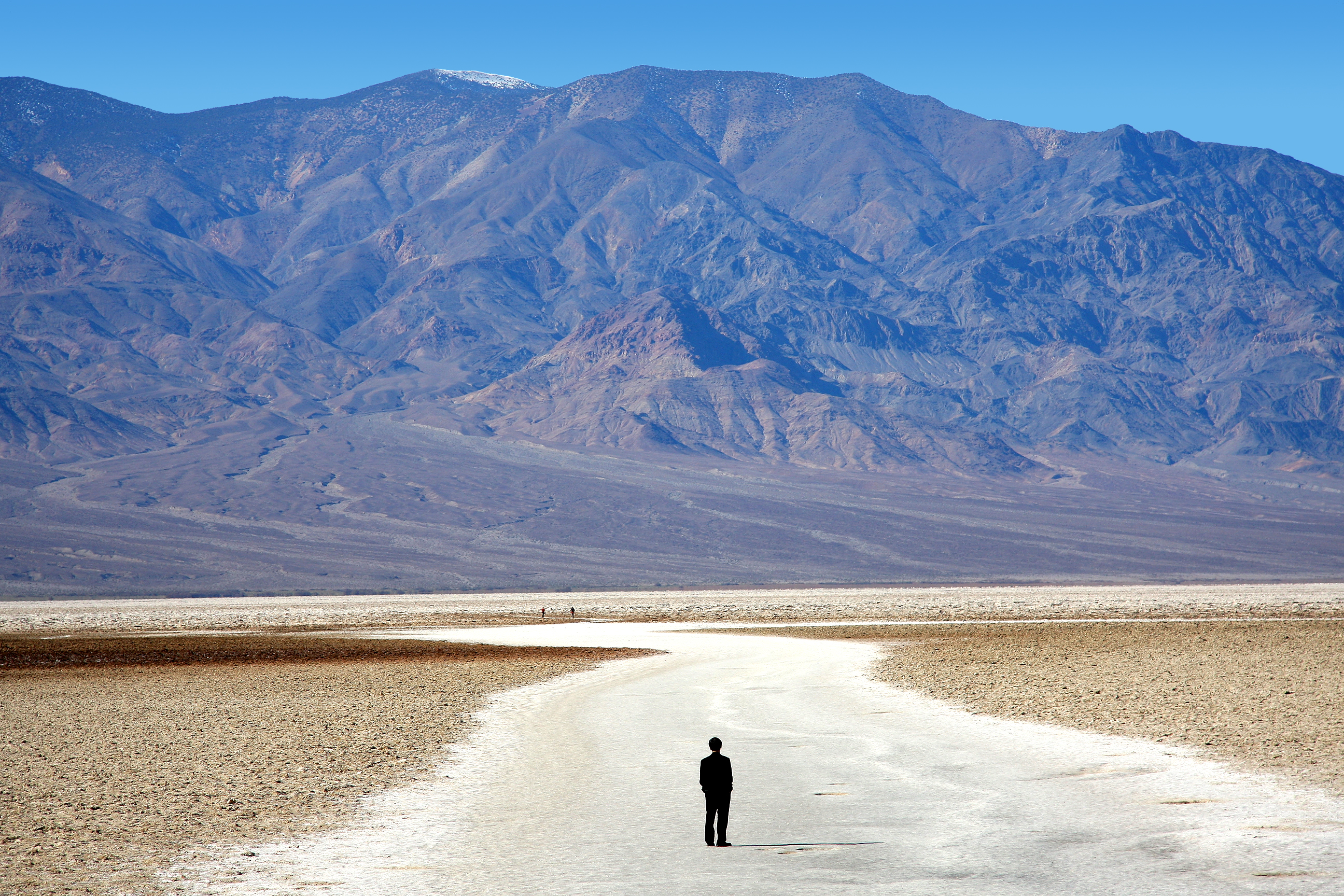
View from Badwater Basin

The highest overnight or low temperature recorded in Death Valley is 110 °F (43 °C), recorded on July 5, 1918. However, this value is disputed; a record high low of 107 °F (42 °C) on July 12, 2012, is considered reliable. This is one of the highest values ever recorded. Also on July 12, 2012, the mean 24-hour temperature recorded at Death Valley was 117.5 °F (47.5 °C), which makes it the world's warmest 24-hour temperature on record. July 2024 was the hottest month ever recorded in Death Valley, with a mean daily average temperature over the month of 108.5 °F (42.5 °C).

Four major mountain ranges lie between Death Valley and the ocean, each one adding to an increasingly drier rain shadow effect, and in 1929, 1953, and 1989, no rain was recorded for the whole year. The period from 1931 to 1934 was the driest stretch on record, with only 0.64 inches (16 mm) of rain over a 40-month period. The average annual precipitation in Death Valley is 2.36 inches (60 mm), while the Greenland Ranch station averaged 1.58 in (40 mm). The wettest month on record is January 1995, when 2.59 inches (66 mm) fell on Death Valley. The wettest period on record was mid-2004 to mid-2005, in which nearly 6 inches (150 mm) of rain fell in total, leading to ephemeral lakes in the valley and the region and tremendous wildflower blooms. Snow with accumulation has only been recorded in January 1922, while scattered flakes have been recorded on other occasions.

Death Valley National Park

Climate chart (precipitation, max. and min. temperature)
| J | F | M | A | M | J | J | A | S | O | N | D |
| 0.4 67 43 | 0.5 74 49 | 0.3 83 57 | 0.1 91 65 | 0 101 75 | 0.1 111 84 | 0.1 117 91 | 0.1 116 89 | 0.2 108 79 | 0.1 93 64 | 0.1 77 51 | 0.3 66 41 |
- █ Average max. and min. temperatures in °F
- █ Precipitation totals in inches
- Source: NOAA
Metric conversion
| J | F | M | A | M | J | J | A | S | O | N | D |
| 10 20 6 | 13 23 9 | 7.6 28 14 | 2.5 33 18 | 0 38 24 | 2.5 44 29 | 2.5 47 33 | 2.5 47 32 | 5.1 42 26 | 2.5 34 18 | 2.5 25 10 | 7.6 19 5 |
- █ Average max. and min. temperatures in °C
- █ Precipitation totals in mm

Climate data for Death Valley National Park, California, 1991–2020 normals, (Note: Mean maxima and minima (i.e. the highest and lowest temperature readings during an entire month or year) calculated based on data at said location from 1991 to 2020) extremes 1911–present
| Month | Jan | Feb | Mar | Apr | May | Jun | Jul | Aug | Sep | Oct | Nov | Dec | Year |
|---|---|---|---|---|---|---|---|---|---|---|---|---|---|
| Record high °F (°C) | 90 (32) | 97 (36) | 105 (41) | 113 (45) | 122 (50) | 129 (54) | 134 (57) | 130 (54) | 127 (53) | 114 (46) | 98 (37) | 89 (32) | 134 (57) |
| Mean maximum °F (°C) | 78.4 (25.8) | 85.1 (29.5) | 95.4 (35.2) | 106.0 (41.1) | 113.6 (45.3) | 117.5 (47.5) | 125.9 (52.2) | 124.0 (51.1) | 118.1 (47.8) | 106.2 (41.2) | 90.0 (32.2) | 77.8 (25.4) | 126.7 (52.6) |
| Mean daily maximum °F (°C) | 67.2 (19.6) | 73.7 (23.2) | 82.6 (28.1) | 91.0 (32.8) | 100.7 (38.2) | 111.1 (43.9) | 117.4 (47.4) | 115.9 (46.6) | 107.7 (42.1) | 93.3 (34.1) | 77.4 (25.2) | 65.6 (18.7) | 92.0 (33.3) |
| Daily mean °F (°C) | 54.9 (12.7) | 61.3 (16.3) | 69.8 (21.0) | 77.9 (25.5) | 87.8 (31.0) | 97.5 (36.4) | 104.2 (40.1) | 102.3 (39.1) | 93.4 (34.1) | 78.9 (26.1) | 64.0 (17.8) | 53.4 (11.9) | 78.8 (26.0) |
| Mean daily minimum °F (°C) | 42.5 (5.8) | 49.0 (9.4) | 57.1 (13.9) | 64.8 (18.2) | 75.0 (23.9) | 84.0 (28.9) | 91.0 (32.8) | 88.7 (31.5) | 79.1 (26.2) | 64.4 (18.0) | 50.5 (10.3) | 41.1 (5.1) | 65.6 (18.7) |
| Mean minimum °F (°C) | 30.5 (−0.8) | 36.1 (2.3) | 42.8 (6.0) | 49.8 (9.9) | 58.5 (14.7) | 67.9 (19.9) | 78.3 (25.7) | 75.3 (24.1) | 65.4 (18.6) | 49.5 (9.7) | 35.9 (2.2) | 29.0 (−1.7) | 28.0 (−2.2) |
| Record low °F (°C) | 15 (−9) | 20 (−7) | 26 (−3) | 35 (2) | 42 (6) | 49 (9) | 62 (17) | 65 (18) | 41 (5) | 32 (0) | 24 (−4) | 19 (−7) | 15 (−9) |
| Average precipitation inches (mm) | 0.37 (9.4) | 0.52 (13) | 0.25 (6.4) | 0.10 (2.5) | 0.03 (0.76) | 0.05 (1.3) | 0.10 (2.5) | 0.10 (2.5) | 0.20 (5.1) | 0.12 (3.0) | 0.10 (2.5) | 0.26 (6.6) | 2.20 (56) |
| Average snowfall inches (cm) | 0.0 (0.0) | 0.0 (0.0) | 0.0 (0.0) | 0.0 (0.0) | 0.0 (0.0) | 0.0 (0.0) | 0.0 (0.0) | 0.0 (0.0) | 0.0 (0.0) | 0.0 (0.0) | 0.0 (0.0) | 0.0 (0.0) | 0.0 (0.0) |
| Average precipitation days (≥ 0.01 inch) | 2.4 | 2.9 | 2.0 | 1.1 | 0.9 | 0.3 | 1.1 | 0.9 | 0.8 | 1.1 | 0.9 | 1.6 | 16.0 |
| Average snowy days (≥ 0.1 in) | 0 | 0 | 0 | 0 | 0 | 0 | 0 | 0 | 0 | 0 | 0 | 0 | 0 |
| Average relative humidity (%) | 42 | 38 | 31 | 22 | 19 | 15 | 17 | 17 | 20 | 24 | 32 | 42 | 27 |
| Average afternoon relative humidity (%) | 18 | 17 | 17 | 12 | 9 | 5 | 6 | 6 | 5 | 8 | 13 | 19 | 11 |
Source: NOAA

Climate data for Death Valley National Park, California, Humidity
| Month | Jan | Feb | Mar | Apr | May | Jun | Jul | Aug | Sep | Oct | Nov | Dec | Year |
|---|---|---|---|---|---|---|---|---|---|---|---|---|---|
| Average relative humidity (%) | 42 | 38 | 31 | 22 | 19 | 15 | 17 | 17 | 20 | 24 | 32 | 42 | 27 |
| Average afternoon relative humidity (%) | 18 | 17 | 17 | 12 | 9 | 5 | 6 | 6 | 5 | 8 | 13 | 19 | 11 |

Climate data for Death Valley (Cow Creek Station)
| Month | Jan | Feb | Mar | Apr | May | Jun | Jul | Aug | Sep | Oct | Nov | Dec | Year |
|---|---|---|---|---|---|---|---|---|---|---|---|---|---|
| Record high °F (°C) | 84 (29) | 89 (32) | 100 (38) | 110 (43) | 120 (49) | 125 (52) | 126 (52) | 125 (52) | 123 (51) | 111 (44) | 95 (35) | 84 (29) | 126 (52) |
| Mean daily maximum °F (°C) | 64.4 (18.0) | 71.6 (22.0) | 80.6 (27.0) | 90.9 (32.7) | 100.0 (37.8) | 109.3 (42.9) | 116.0 (46.7) | 113.8 (45.4) | 106.9 (41.6) | 92.1 (33.4) | 75.4 (24.1) | 65.9 (18.8) | 90.6 (32.6) |
| Daily mean °F (°C) | 52.5 (11.4) | 59.1 (15.1) | 67.4 (19.7) | 77.5 (25.3) | 86.4 (30.2) | 95.3 (35.2) | 102.1 (38.9) | 99.9 (37.7) | 92.1 (33.4) | 78.1 (25.6) | 62.3 (16.8) | 54.1 (12.3) | 77.2 (25.1) |
| Mean daily minimum °F (°C) | 40.6 (4.8) | 46.6 (8.1) | 54.3 (12.4) | 64.1 (17.8) | 72.7 (22.6) | 81.2 (27.3) | 88.4 (31.3) | 86.0 (30.0) | 77.4 (25.2) | 64.0 (17.8) | 49.3 (9.6) | 42.4 (5.8) | 63.9 (17.7) |
| Record low °F (°C) | 19 (−7) | 30 (−1) | 33 (1) | 45 (7) | 52 (11) | 54 (12) | 69 (21) | 69 (21) | 57 (14) | 40 (4) | 32 (0) | 27 (−3) | 19 (−7) |
| Average precipitation inches (mm) | 0.24 (6.1) | 0.32 (8.1) | 0.20 (5.1) | 0.20 (5.1) | 0.10 (2.5) | 0.02 (0.51) | 0.10 (2.5) | 0.11 (2.8) | 0.12 (3.0) | 0.11 (2.8) | 0.20 (5.1) | 0.29 (7.4) | 2.00 (51) |
Source: Western Regional Climate Center

=== Flooding ===
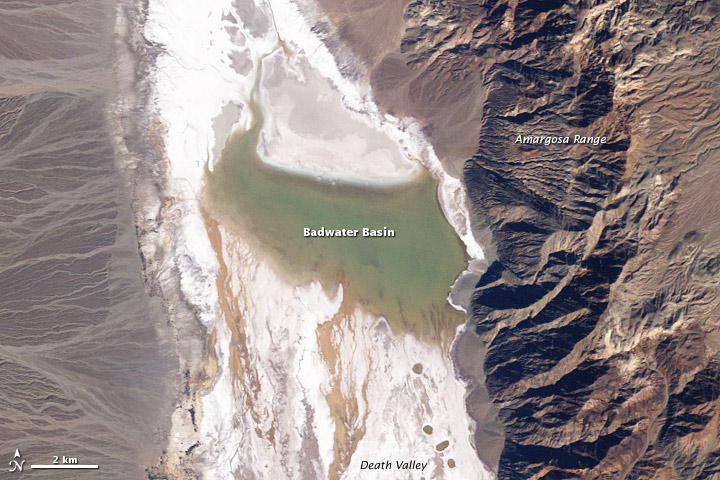
A Landsat 5 satellite photo of Lake Badwater on February 9, 2005

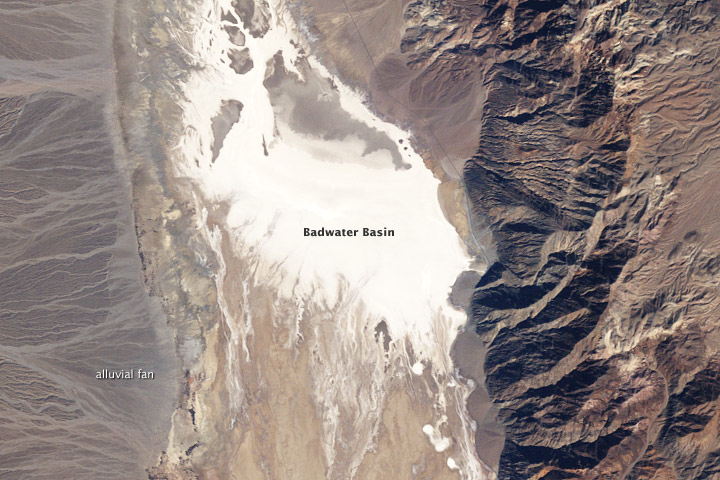
A Landsat 5 satellite photo of Badwater Basin dry lake on February 15, 2007

In 2005, Death Valley received four times its average annual rainfall of 1.5 inches (38 mm). As it has done before for hundreds of years, the lowest spot in the valley filled with a wide, shallow lake, but the extreme heat and aridity immediately began evaporating the ephemeral lake.

The pair of images (seen at right) from NASA's Landsat 5 satellite documents the short history of Death Valley's Lake Badwater: formed in February 2005 (top) and evaporated by February 2007 (bottom). In 2005, a big pool of greenish water stretched most of the way across the valley floor. By May 2005, the valley floor had resumed its more familiar role as Badwater Basin, salt-coated salt flats. In time, this freshly dissolved and recrystallized salt will darken.

The western margin of Death Valley is traced by alluvial fans. During flash floods, rainfall from the steep mountains to the west pours through narrow canyons, picking up everything from fine clay to large rocks. When these torrents reach the mouths of the canyons, they widen and slow, branching out into distributary channels. The paler the fans, the younger they are.

== Ecology ==
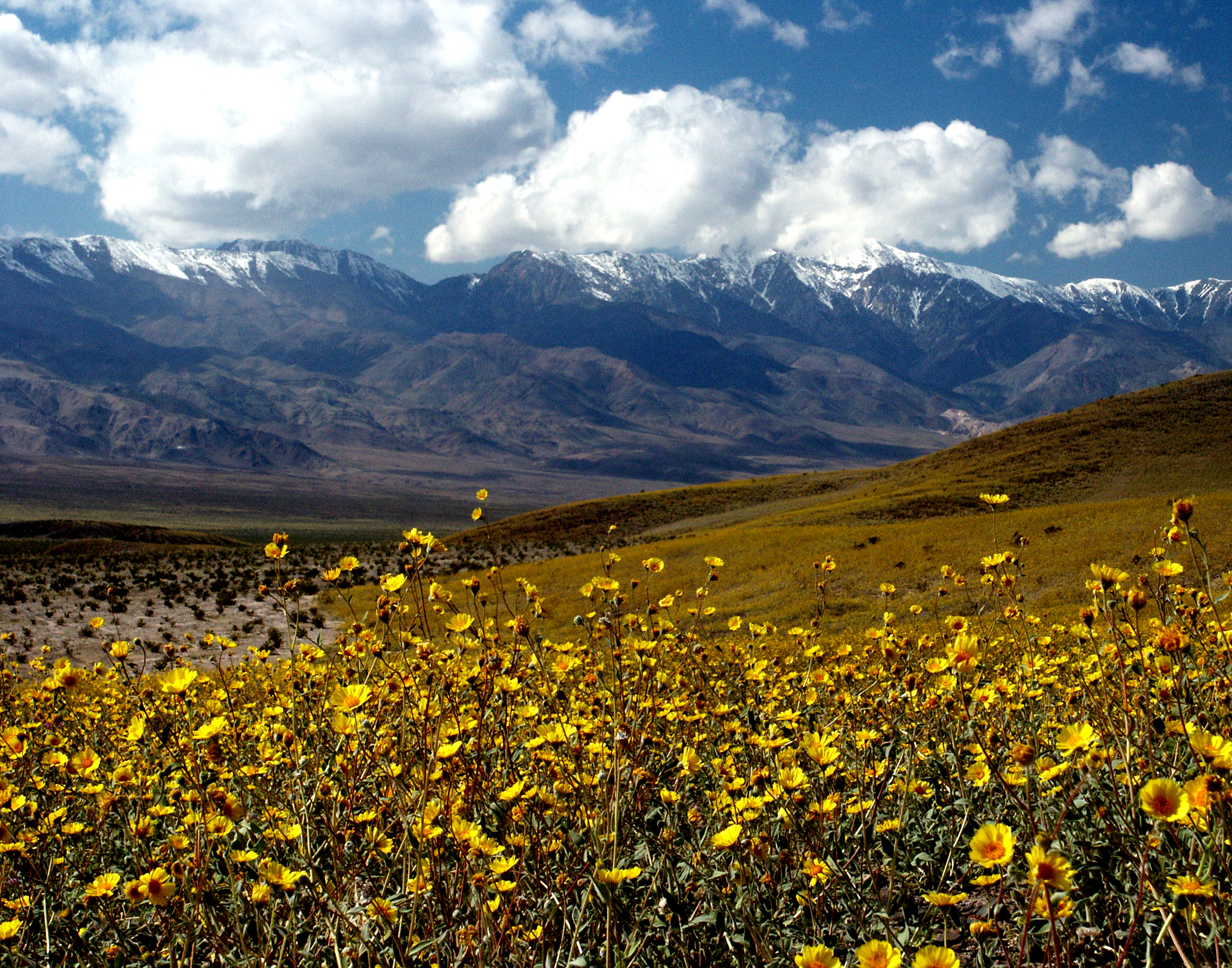
Death Valley in 2005 springtime bloom

In spite of the overwhelming heat and sparse rainfall, Death Valley exhibits considerable biodiversity. Flowers, watered by snowmelt, carpet the desert floor each spring, continuing into June. Bighorn sheep, red-tailed hawks, and feral donkeys may be seen. Death Valley has over 600 springs and ponds. Salt Creek, a mile-long shallow depression in the center of the valley, supports Death Valley pupfish. These isolated pupfish populations are remnants of the wetter Pleistocene climate.

Darwin Falls, on the western edge of Death Valley Monument, falls 100 feet (30 m) into a large pond surrounded by willows and cottonwood trees. More than 80 species of bird have been recorded around the pond.

Efflorescence, also known as salt flowers, is a rare occurrence in Death Valley that occurs when rain soaks into the soil and dissolves salt beneath the surface causing the ground to appear as if there is a light dusting of snow.

== History ==
Death Valley is home to the Timbisha tribe of Native Americans, formerly known as the Panamint Shoshone, who have inhabited the valley for at least the past millennium. The Timbisha name for the valley, tümpisa, means "rock paint" and refers to the red ocher paint that can be made from a type of clay found in the valley. Some families still live in the valley at Furnace Creek. Another village was in Grapevine Canyon near the present site of Scotty's Castle. It was called maahunu in the Timbisha language, whose meaning is uncertain, although it is known that hunu means 'canyon'.

The valley received its English name in 1849 during the California Gold Rush. It was called Death Valley by prospectors and others who sought to cross the valley on their way to the gold fields, after 13 pioneers perished from one early expedition of wagon trains. During the 1850s, gold and silver were extracted in the valley. In the 1880s, borax was discovered and extracted by mule-drawn wagons.

Death Valley National Monument was proclaimed on February 11, 1933, by President Herbert Hoover, placing the area under federal protection. In 1994, the monument was redesignated as Death Valley National Park, as well as being substantially expanded to include Saline and Eureka Valleys.

== Notable attractions and locations ==
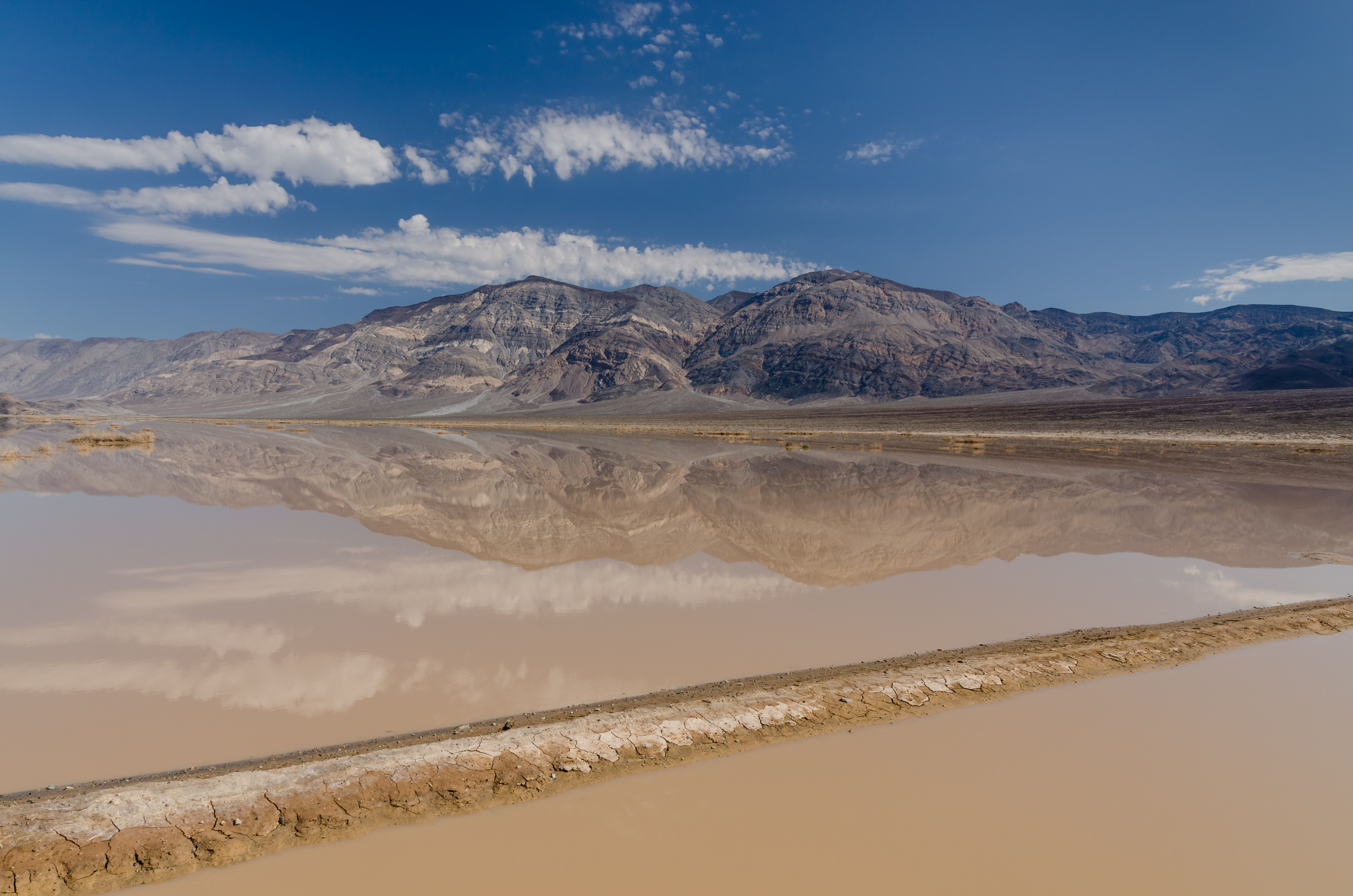
Flash flood near Panamint Butte, Death Valley, in 2013

- Badwater Basin
- China Ranch
- Dante's View
- Darwin Falls
- Devils Hole
- Father Crowley Viewpoint
- Furnace Creek
- Harmony Borax Works
- Hells Gate
- Myers Ranch
- Oasis at Death Valley
- Russell Camp
- New Ryan
- Upper and Lower Noonday Camp
- Racetrack Playa, a large dry lakebed within the Valley
- Sailing stones, famous moving stones of Death Valley
- Scotty's Castle
- Shoreline Butte
- Stovepipe Wells
- Tecopa
- Tecopa Hot Springs
- West Side Borax Camp
- Wilson Ranch
- Wildrose Ranger Station
- Zabriskie Point

== In literature and the arts ==
=== Films ===
A number of movies have been filmed in Death Valley, including:

- Chimmie Fadden Out West (1915)
- The Dawn of Understanding (1918)
- Greed (1924)
- The Air Mail (1925)
- The Brute (1927)
- The Chinese Parrot (1927)
- Fair Warning (1931)
- The Border Patrolman (1936)
- Danger Valley (1937)
- 20 Mule Team (1940)
- The Bride Came C.O.D. (1941)
- Castle in the Desert (1942)
- Accomplice (1946)
- Death Valley (1946)
- 3 Godfathers (1948)
- Yellow Sky (1948)
- Death Valley Gunfighter (1949)
- The Walking Hills (1949)
- Surrender (1950)
- The Gunfighter (1950)
- Cattle Drive (1951)
- Westward the Women (1951)
- City of Bad Men (1953)
- Escape from Fort Bravo (1953)
- Tumbleweed (1953)
- War Paint (1953)
- The Law and Jake Wade (1958)
- One-Eyed Jacks (1961)
- The Reward (1965)
- The Professionals (1966)
- Zabriskie Point (1970)
- Star Wars (1977)
- Raiders of the Lost Ark (1981)
- Death Valley (1982)
- Cherry 2000 (1987)
- Phantasm IV: Oblivion (1998)
- Six-String Samurai (1998)
- Gerry (2002)
- Daft Punk's Electroma (2006)
- The Legend of God's Gun (2007)
- Ancient Caves (2020)

=== Music ===
- Death Valley Suite (1949), a symphonic suite by Ferde Grofé, inspired by the history and geography of Death Valley
- "Death Valley" (2013), a song from the studio album Save Rock and Roll by Fall Out Boy, is named after Death Valley, as well as containing lyrics inspired by this location
- "Death Valley '69" (1984), a song by Sonic Youth and Lydia Lunch, is about the valley, and the video features imagery of it.
- "Death Valley Nights" (1977), a song from the studio album Spectres by Blue Öyster Cult, takes place in the valley, using the extreme climate to mirror a dramatic love/hate relationship.
- The album cover for post-rock album 'Allelujah! Don't Bend! Ascend! (2012) by Canadian colletive Godspeed You! Black Emperor features a building located in Death Valley.
- "Canyon Moon" (2014), a song by Andrew McMahon in the Wilderness, contains lyrics about driving through Death Valley.
- "Who Feels Love?", a song by Oasis, had its music video filmed in Death Valley.
- "Death Valley High" (2024), a song by Orville Peck and Beck, a song about Death Valley.

=== Television ===
- Death Valley Days (1930–1945 radio series; 1952–1970 TV series), an American radio and television anthology series that presented true stories of the American Old West, a number of which featured the Death Valley area.
- The retired wrestler and WWE Hall of Famer The Undertaker is billed from Death Valley, apart from when he was the American Badass from 2000 to 2003.
- The FX horror anthology series American Horror Story has a tenth season titled American Horror Story: Double Feature, which is split into two parts. While the first part, Red Tide, takes place by the sea, the second part of the season, Death Valley, focuses on a group of teens uncovering a conspiracy involving Dwight D. Eisenhower and strange occurrences in a desert partially inspired by Death Valley involving aliens and UFOs.

== See also ==
- List of weather records
- Harry Wade Exit Route
