= Artley =

Artley is a surname. Notable people with the surname include:

- Brad Artley, American drummer
- Bob Artley (1917–2011), American cartoonist
- Meredith Artley, American journalist
