= Gram Rabbit discography =

- Studio albums: 5
- EPs: 3
- Singles: 6

The discography of Gram Rabbit, an American indie rock band from Joshua Tree, California consists of five studio albums, and three extended plays. The band was formed in 2003 by singer/keyboardist/guitarist Jesika von Rabbit, guitarist/singer Todd Rutherford and bassist/sampler Travis Cline. Although on hiatus, its current line-up is Jesika von Rabbit, Todd Rutherford, Jason Gilbert, Ethan Allen. Jesika von Rabbit has released one studio album.

== Albums ==
=== Studio albums ===
==== Music to Start a Cult To ====
Album details
- Released: August 17, 2004
- Genre: Psychedelic rock, space rock, electropop
- Label: Stinky Records
- Band is Jesika von Rabbit, Todd Rutherford, Travis Cline
- Produced by Ethan Allen at MY Studio in Silverlake, California; Mastered by Dave Collins; Mixed by Ethan Allen and James Adam Watts; Artwork by Chrissy Kesselring
- Jesika von Rabbit - vocals, keyboard, bass, guitar; Todd Rutherford - vocals, bass, guitar, programming; Travis Cline - samplers, noise detail; Ethan Allen - guitar, programming; Tracy Lyons-Tarr - guitar (track 6); Darren Moran - guitar (track 4); Robin Hughes - guitar (tracks 3, 5, 6, & 9)
Tracks

All tracks are written by Jesika von Rabbit, Todd Rutherford

No.	Title	Length
1.	"Dirty Horse"	3:47
2.	"Cowboy-Up"	4:38
3.	"Kill a Man"	4:34
4.	"Disco #2"	5:14
5.	"Witness"	4:49
6.	"Land of Jail"	3:33
7.	"Lost in Place"	4:13
8.	"Devil's Playground"	5:23
9.	"I & Sesuj"	0:24
10.	"Cowboys & Aliens"	4:47
11.	"New Energy"	5:30
Total length:		46:52

==== Cultivation ====
Album details
- Released: April 18, 2006
- Genre: Indie rock, shoegaze, space rock, psychedelic rock
- Label: Stinky Records
- Band is Jesika von Rabbit, Todd Rutherford, Travis Cline, Eric Jonasson
- Produced by Ethan Allen, Todd Rutherford; Recorded & Mixed by Ethan Allen and Gram Rabbit at Head Room, Silverlake, CA and the Rabbit Ranch, Joshua Tree, CA; Mastered by Chris Gehringer at Sterling Sound; Additional mixing by Jim Watts; Art Design by Kevin Reagan; Photography by Michael Dahan
- Jesika von Rabbit - vocals, keyboard, guitar; Todd Rutherford - vocals, bass, guitar, programming; Travis Cline - samples, noise detail, love; Ethan Jonasson - guitar, background vocals; Brian MacLeod - drums; Ethan Allen - programming
Tracks

All tracks are written by Jesika von Rabbit, Todd Rutherford

No.	Title	Length
1.	"Waiting in the Kountry"	5:09
2.	"No Thoughts"	0:22
3.	"Bloody Bunnies (Superficiality)"	3:28
4.	"Angel Song"	4:33
5.	"Charlie's Kids"	2:54
6.	"Paper Heart"	3:53
7.	"Slopoke"	4:27
8.	"Jesus & I"	4:09
9.	"Sorry"	4:11
10.	"Crossing Guards with Guns"	3:48
11.	"Follow Your Heart"	4:05
12.	"Hares Don't Have Tea"	1:38
Total length:		42:37

==== RadioAngel & the RobotBeat ====
Album details
- Released: November 13, 2007
- Genre: Psychedelic rock, industrial dance, electronica
- Label: Royal Order
- Band is Jesika von Rabbit, Todd Rutherford
- Produced and Recorded by Ethan Allen and Gram Rabbit at Royal Triton Studio in Silverlake, California; Drums Recorded at Pete Min's Studio; Mastered by Bruce Barielle; Mixed by Ethan Allen and James Adams Watts; Art Design by Jennifer Murse; Photography by Matthew Cooke
- Jesika von Rabbit - vocals, keyboard, guitar, programming; Todd Rutherford - vocals, bass, guitar, programming; Ethan Allen - guitar, programming; Brian MacLeod - drums (tracks 1 & 9); Austin Space - drums (tracks 7 & 11); Jemma and Cyndera - spoken samples (track 12); Pam Aronoff - additional sound design (track 1)
Tracks

All tracks are written by Jesika von Rabbit, Todd Rutherford

No.	Title	Length
1.	"American Hookers"	3:49
2.	"The Rest of Us Sleep"	4:03
3.	"In My Book"	3:25
4.	"Fancy Dancy"	3:28
5.	"Something Fuzzy"	3:28
6.	"Get Up Off It"	1:55
7.	"Hot Spit"	3:15
8.	"Less Is More"	2:57
9.	"Shiny Monster"	3:25
10.	"Landers"	0:49
11.	"The Places We Go"	4:42
12.	"I Wear the Ears"	5:49
Total length:		46:52

==== Miracles & Metaphors ====
Album details
- Released: October 12, 2010
- Genre: Indie rock, space rock, electropop
- Label: Cobraside, Royal Order
- Band is Jesika von Rabbit, Todd Rutherford, Ethan Allen, Hayden Scott
- Produced and Recorded by Ethan Allen and Gram Rabbit at The Powderhorn Ranch in Pioneertown, CA, with additional recording at Rabbit Ranch in Joshuat Tree, Royal Triton Studio in Silverlake, and the Boat Studio in Silverlake; Mastered by Bruce Barielle; Mixed by Ethan Allen and James Adams Watts; Artwork by Growvision; Photography by Marina Chavez
- Jesika von Rabbit - vocals, keyboard, guitar; Todd Rutherford - vocals, bass, guitar, programming; Ethan Allen; guitar, programming, vocals; Hayden Scott - drums; Hillary Hack - guest vocals (track 2); Brian MacLeod - drums (all tracks except 2); Henri Benard - drums (track 2); Bill Marsh - Pedal Steel (tracks 3, 5, 7 & 8); Stewart Cole - trumpet (tracks 5 & 9); Brandon Jay - percussion (track 11); Larry Nettles - spoken sample (track 10)
Tracks

All tracks are written by Gram Rabbit except where noted

No.	Title	Writer(s)	Length
1.	"Time of Our Lives"		4:06
2.	"Candy Flip"	Gram Rabbit, Hillary Hack	4:46
3.	"Falling Debris"		4:32
4.	"Hyena"		3:55
5.	"Flowerhead"	Jesika von Rabbit, Todd Rutherford, Zaine Alwan	3:30
6.	"Off with Your Head"		3:39
7.	"Wheels in Motion"		4:58
8.	"Another Long Day"		6:13
9.	"Destinies Align"		4:07
10.	"They're Watching"		2:51
11.	"Horses Can't Throw Up"		3:25
12.	"I Rest My Case"		2:04
Total length:			48:06

==== Welcome to the Country ====
Album details
- Released: July 18, 2012
- Genre: Psychedelic rock, space rock, country rock
- Label: Royal Order
- Band is Jesika von Rabbit, Todd Rutherford
- Produced, Recorded and Mixed by Todd Rutherford and Jesika von Rabbit at Hicksville Trailer Palace in Joshua Tree, CA; Mastered by Bruce Barielle; Artwork design by Robin Davy; Photography by Marina "Cha Cha" Chavez
- Jesika von Rabbit - vocals, keyboard, guitar; Todd Rutherford - vocals, bass, guitar, programming; JP Houston - piano (tracks 7, 9 & 10); Ryan Erskine - additional guitar (tracks 5, 7, 9 & 10); Bill Maresh - pedal steel (tracks 1, 2 & 7); Scott "Drago" Kissinger - horns (tracks 4 & 6); James St. James - drums (track 9); Brandon Henderson - additional guitar (track 10), bass (track 7 & 10); Eric Jonasson - vocals, guitar (track 10); Naomi Husaruk - vocals & accordion (track 10); Jamie Hafler & Cristie Carter - extra vocals (track 10)
Tracks

All tracks are written by Jesika von Rabbit, Todd Rutherford except where noted

No.	Title	Writer(s)	Length
1.	"Wild Imagination"		3:44
2.	"Country Jo"		3:32
3.	"Eeyore"		3:50
4.	"I've Been Thinking"		5:09
5.	"Olde October Moon"		5:11
6.	"Rider on a White Horse"	Lee Hazlewood	4:00
7.	"Too Drive to Drunk"		3:37
8.	"Country Lullaby"		3:43
9.	"Honky Tonkin'"		3:52
10.	"Din Ho"		2:38
Total length:			39:16

=== Demo albums ===
Date	Title
2002	Desert Variety Show: Format: CD

== Extended Play ==
=== Rare Bits ===
Album details
- Released: June 7, 2008
- Genre: Indie rock, space rock, electronica
- Label: Royal Order
- Band is Jesika von Rabbit, Todd Rutherford, Robin Hughes
- Note: Previously unreleased collection of the band's earliest home recordings
Tracks

All tracks are written by Jesika von Rabbit, Todd Rutherford

No.	Title	Length
1.	"Patrolled by Witchcraft"	6:52
2.	"Orange You Glad"	5:13
3.	"New Delite"	5:11
4.	"French for American Soldiers"	4:41
5.	"Mysterioso"	7:20
6.	"Hot Pink Hawaii"	3:40
Total length:		32:57

=== The Desert Sound E.P. ===
Album details
- Released: July 21, 2010
- Genre: Indie rock, space rock, electronica
- Label: Royal Order
Tracks

All tracks are written by Jesika von Rabbit, Todd Rutherford except where noted

No.	Title	Writer(s)	Length
1.	"Candy Flip"	Jesika von Rabbit, Todd Rutherford, Hillary Hack	4:45
2.	"Falling Debris"		4:32
3.	"Her Secret Power"		4:50
4.	"Something Fuzzy (Hayden Scott Remix)"		3:59
Total length:			18:06

=== Braised & Confused ===
Album details
- Released: April 9, 2013
- Genre: Indie rock, space rock, electronica
- Label: Royal Order
- Band is Jesika von Rabbit, Todd Rutherford, Ethan Allen, Jason Gilbert
- Recorded by Gram Rabbit at Hicksville Trailer Palace & the Rabbit Ranch in Joshua Tree, CA, & Royal Triton Studios in Silverlake; Mastered by Paul Logus; Mixed by Michael Patterson; Track 1 Mixed by Ethan Allen and James Adam Watts; Art design by Todd Rutherford & Jesika von Rabbit; Painting by the One and Only Bret Philpot
- Jesika von Rabbit - vocals, keyboard; Todd Rutherford - vocals, bass; Ethan Allen - guitar, vocals; Jason Gilbert - drums; Hayden Scott - drums (track 1); John Moreno - spoken samples (track 3 & 7)
Tracks

All tracks are written by Gram Rabbit except where noted

No.	Title	Writer(s)	Length
1.	"Final Clap Fever"		4:27
2.	"Holy Ghost"		3:40
3.	"Fantastic Visions" (Spoken track by John Moreno)	John Moreno	0:39
4.	"Big Deal"		4:31
5.	"Song #2"	Blur	2:33
6.	"March of Fools"		4:24
7.	"Loudmouth" (Spoken parts by John Moreno)		5:53
Total length:			26:07

== Singles ==
Release date	Single
December 1, 2008	"California Christmas"
July 21, 2010	"Stars"
October 4, 2010	"Off With Your Head"
October 1, 2012	"Final Clap Fever"
May 8, 2013	"Patriotica Neurotica"
August 29, 2014	"Desperate Heart"

== Solo albums by Jesika von Rabbit ==
=== Studio albums ===
==== Journey Mitchell ====
Album details
- Released: February 7, 2015
- Genre: Pop, electro, electropop
- Label: Royal Order
- Produced by Jesika von Rabbit, Todd Rutherford at the Rabbit Ranch in Joshua Tree, CA; Mastered by Bruce Barielle; Mixed by Todd Rutherford; Artwork by Antonio "mrtamale" Mendoza
- Jesika von Rabbit - vocals, keyboard, guitar, bass; Ethan Allen - guitar (track 10); Hayden Scott - programming (tracks 5 & 6); Robbie Waldman - extra bass (track 7)
Tracks

All tracks are written by Jesika von Rabbit except where noted

No.	Title	Writer(s)	Length
1.	"Metanoia"		0:55
2.	"Glamorous Misery"		3:53
3.	"Psychic Spice"		3:09
4.	"Spooky Action"		2:34
5.	"Put Your Weight on Me"		3:11
6.	"Gaydar"		2:51
7.	"Looking for a Weirdo"		3:30
8.	"Sugarwater Man"		3:52
9.	"The Way That I Want"		3:56
10.	"She Bop"	Cyndi Lauper, Jesika von Rabbit	4:28
Total length:			32:19

== Solo albums by Todd Rutherford ==
=== Studio albums ===
Date	Title
TBA	TBA
