= Frankie Emerson =

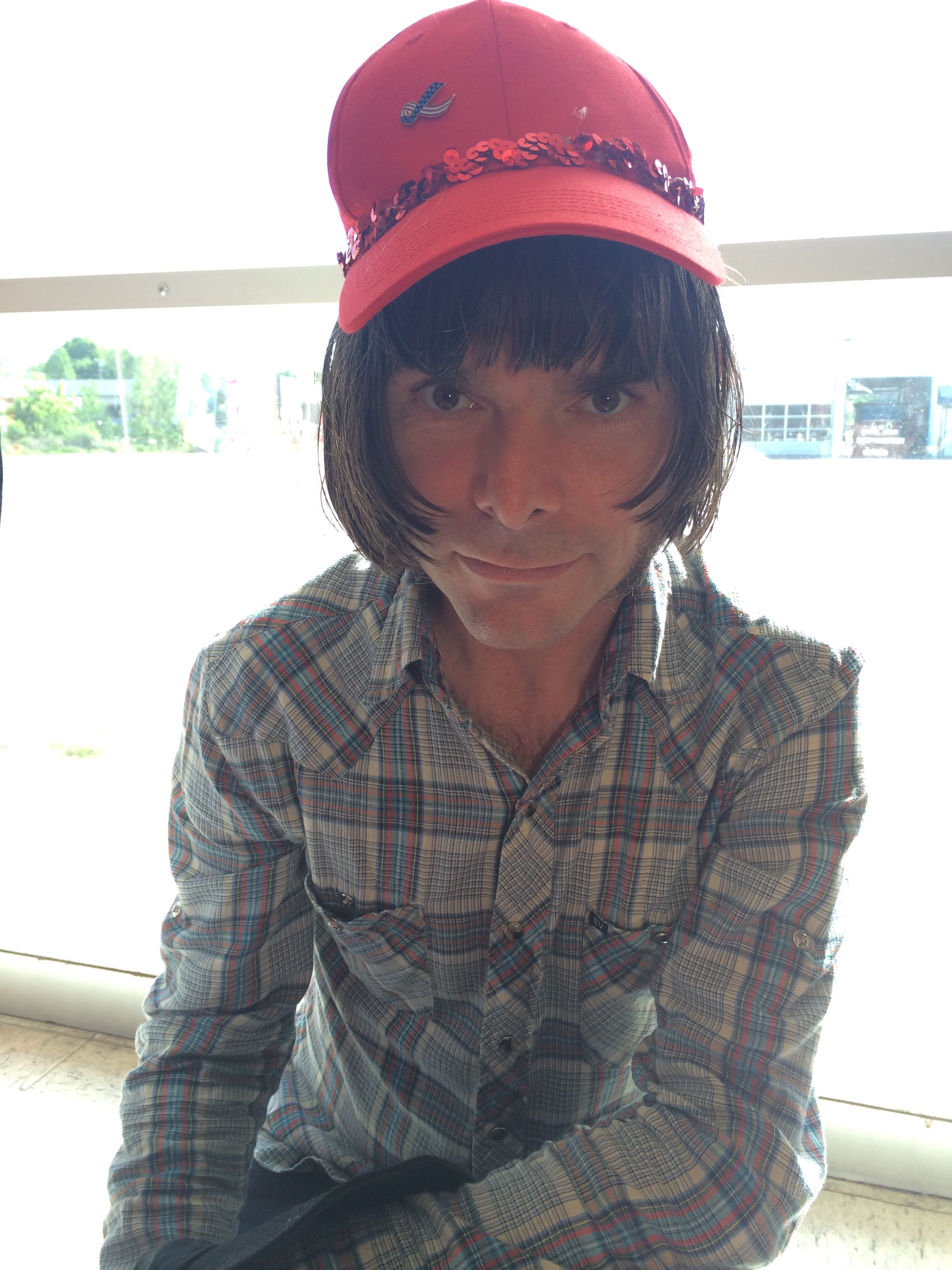

Background information
- Birth name: Frankie A. Emerson
- Born: May 22, 1972 (age 53)
- Origin: Los Angeles, California, United States
- Genres: Psychedelic, experimental, shoegaze, avant-garde, folk rock, indie rock
- Instrument(s): Guitar, bass guitar, piano, clarinet, banjo, etc.
- Years active: 2000–present
- Labels: Bomp! Records, TVT Records, Tee Pee Records, A Recordings,

Frankie Emerson, also known as Frankie Teardrop, is an American indie multi-instrumentalist, best known for his work with the neo-psychedelic rock band, The Brian Jonestown Massacre.

== The Brian Jonestown Massacre ==
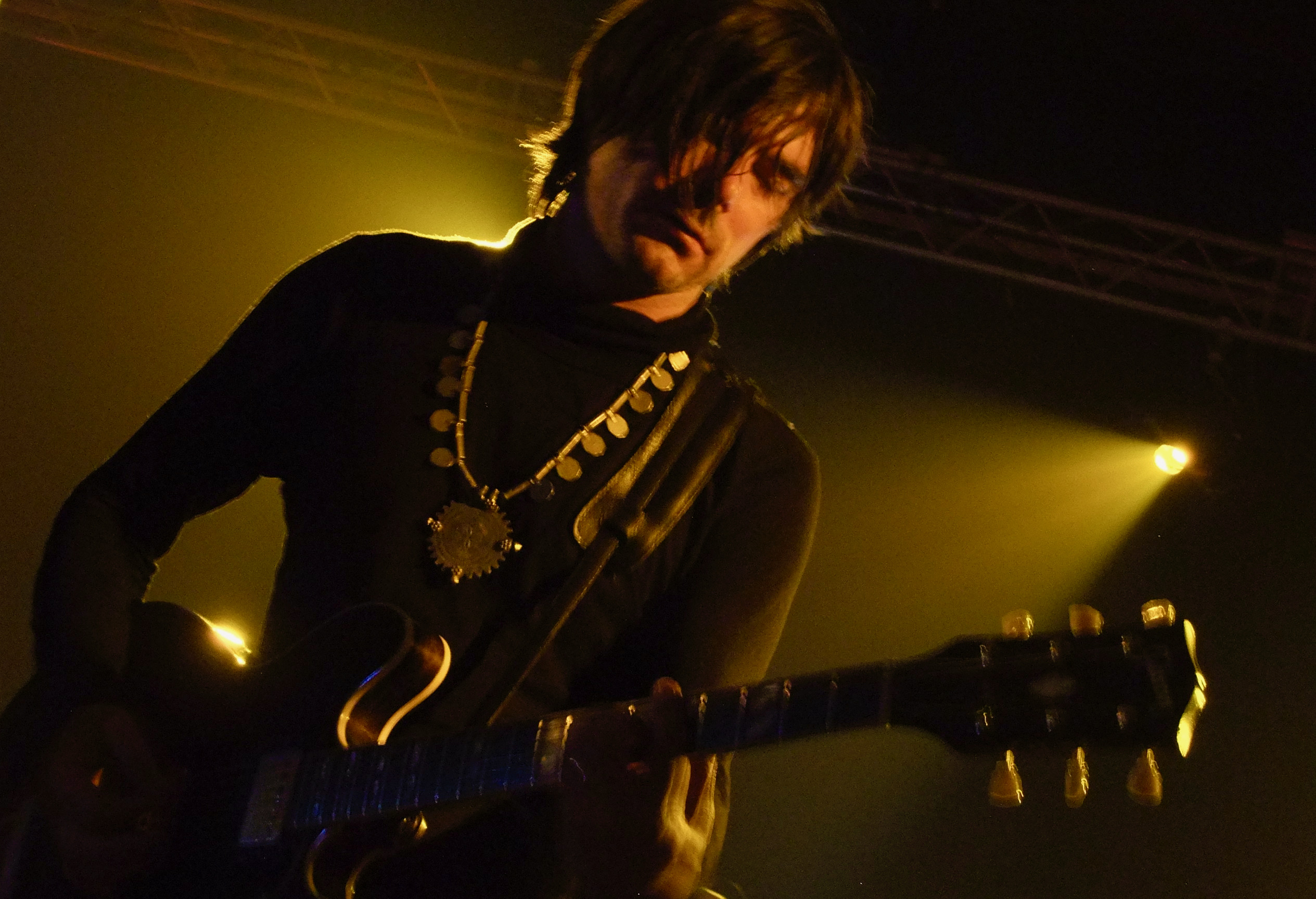
Emerson with the Brian Jonestown Massacre in 2010

Emerson joined The BJM in March, 2000, and is notable for his twelve-string guitar and various other contributions, playing lead guitar on the song "When Jokers Attack", among others, and co-writing "You Have Been Disconnected".

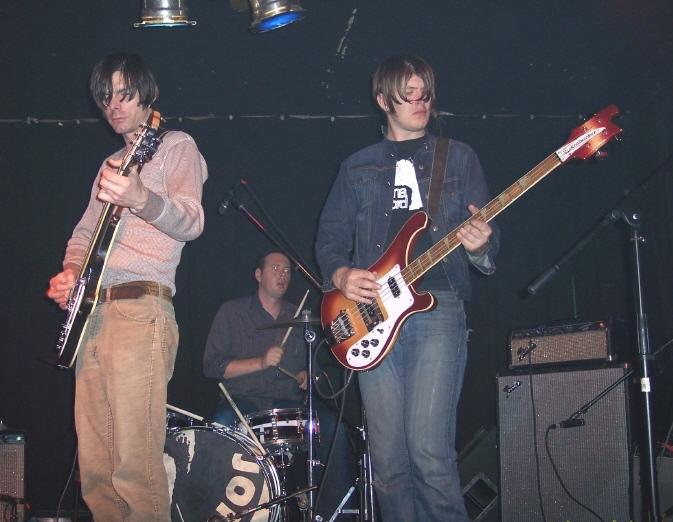
The Brian Jonestown Massacre in 2004

== Spindrift ==
Emerson is a multi-instrumentalist (guitar, keyboards, percussion) and original member of the music line-up of the neo-psychedelic rock band, Spindrift.

== Other projects ==
Emerson has also contributed to other American rock bands; The Situation and playing bass for neo-psychedelic rock band, The Cold War Direction.
