= Ethan Allen (music producer) =

American record producer

Ethan Allen is a Grammy-nominated American record producer, composer, and mixer currently living in Los Angeles, California. He is also a multi-instrumentalist and performer currently working with the band ASHRR. Some of his credits include Mavis Staples, Black Rebel Motorcycle Club, Ben Harper, The 88, Tricky, Luscious Jackson, The Cult, Gram Rabbit, Sheryl Crow, Tim Finn, Brant Bjork, Donita Sparks, Meg Myers, Patty Griffin, and Better Than Ezra.

== History ==
Ethan began his musical career playing in bands and writing songs in Austin, Texas. It was also there that he began learning to record, working first at a small jingle studio, and later at Arlyn and Pedernales, Willie Nelson's two studios and at the time the largest studios in town. In 1995, Ethan accepted an invitation to come and work at Kingsway, producer Daniel Lanois' recording studio located in the French Quarter of New Orleans. While there, he eventually became house engineer and worked on many major label and independent records with a wide variety of artists, producers, engineers, and musical styles. Ethan left that position in 2000 to become a freelance engineer and producer, and also helped to found the Truck Farm Studio in the upper ninth ward of New Orleans. Since 2003, Ethan has been a resident of the Silverlake neighborhood of Los Angeles, and it is also the location of his studio – Royal Triton. His a currently a member of the band ASHRR signed to 20/20 Vision Recordings.

== Discography ==
Artist	Title	Label	Role	Year
ASHRR	Deux Sons -Single	20/20 Vision Recordings	P, E, M, Pr, CoWr	2024
ASHRR	Sway -Single	20/20 Vision Recordings	P, E, M, Pr, CoWr	2024
ASHRR	What's Been Turning You On -Single	20/20 Vision Recordings	P, E, M, Pr, CoWr	2024
ASHRR	Please Don't Stop The Rain -Single	20/20 Vision Recordings	P, E, M, Pr, CoWr	2024
ASHRR	Different Kind Of Life -Single	20/20 Vision Recordings	P, E, M, Pr, CoWr	2024
ASHRR	Fizzy -Single	20/20 Vision Recordings	P, E, M, Pr, CoWr	2024
Athena Andreadis	Ave Maria -Single	Embraceable Records	P, E, M	2024
Athena Andreadis	Ship Song -Single	Embraceable Records	P, E, M	2024
Kiki Holli	Win You Over- Single	Independent	P, E, M, Pr, CoWr	2024
Omar Velasco	Experiment - The Cole Porter Project Film and Album	TBD	P, E, M	2024
Pokey Lefarge	Experiment - The Cole Porter Project Film and Album	TBD	P, E, M	2024
Athena Andreadis	Right Wrongs	Embraceable Records	P, E, M, Pr, CoWr	2024
Athena Andreadis	Hands On Glass	Embraceable Records	P, E, M, Pr, CoWr	2023
ASHRR	Sunshine Lo	First Second	P, E, M, Wr, Pr	2023
ASHRR	Bad Reasons	First Second	P, E, M, Wr, Pr	2023
ASHRR	No Garden	First Second	P, E, M, Wr, Pr	2023
ASHRR	No Garden Opal Remix	First Second	P, E, M, Wr, Pr	2023
ASHRR	No Garden Eastside Remix	First Second	P, E, M, Wr, Pr	2023
Kiki Holli	New High	First Second	P, E, M, Wr, Pr	2023
Ben Harper	Don't Let Me Disappear	Anti Records	P, E, M	2022
The Pierces	Live	Self release	E, M	2020
ASHRR	Dark Eyes	Make Noise/ The Orchard	P, E, M, Guitar, Pr, Writer	2020
Ben Harper and Ziggy Marley	Spinning Faster	Anti Records	P, E, M	2020
Mavis Staples	We Get By	Anti Records	E, Co-P, M	2019
ASHRR	Oscillator	First Second AWAL	P, E, M, Gtr, Keys, Pr, Writer	2019
Richard Waters	The Raven	Watermark	P, E, M, Gtr, Keys, Pr	2019
Greg Corcione	Future In Music	Independent Singles	P, E, M, Gtr, Keys, Pr	2019
Athena Andreadis	I'm Waiting	Embraceable Records	P, E, M, Pr, Gtr, Keys	2019
Ben Harper and Charley Musselwhite	"No Mercy In This Land"	Anti Records	P, E, M	2018
Jesika Von Rabbit	"Dessert Rock"	Dionysus	P, E, M, C0-W, Keys, Gtr, Pr	2019
Strega Bianca	Salem	Salem Records	P, E, M, Keys, Gtr, Pr	2019
Jared and the Mill	Wilderness Call	upcoming release	P, E, M	2018
The Burn Verses	The Burn Verses	Anthem Records	P, E, M	2018
Birdseye	Into The Pines	Blank City Records	P, E, M, Co-W, Keys	2018
Proper Junkies	Ethical Drugs	upcoming release	P, E, M, Keys, Pr	2018
Lola Christison	Lola Christison	upcoming release	P, E, M	2017
Ben Harper and the Innocent Criminals	"Call It What It Is"	Stax/Vagrant	P, E, M	2016
Madeline Spooner	Nautilus	Scry Baby Records	P, E, M, Co-W, Keys, Pr	2016
FLAVIA	Embers	Upcoming release	P, E, M, Co-W, Keys, Pr	2016
Daniel Powter	Independent	upcoming release	E	2015
Ultra Violent Rays	Independent	The Voyeur	P, E, M, Keys, Pr	2015
Natalie Maines	"Mother"	Sony	E	2013
Gram Rabbit	"Braised And Confused"	Royal Order	P, E, M, Vocs, Gtr, Keys, Pr, Co-W	2013
Black Rebel Motorcycle Club	"Specter At The Feast"	Vagrant/ Abstract Dragon	P, E, M	2013
Lisa Donnelly	Home	Independent	P, E, M, Co-W	2013
Meg Myers	Daughter In The Choir	Independent	M	2012
Sleepy Sun	Spine Hits	The End/ ATP	P, E, M	2012
Various Artists	The Music Inside: A Collaboration Dedicated To Waylon Jennings Vol. 2	Scatter Records/Average Joes	P, E, M	2012
Mad Planet	Inside Outburst	Independent	P, E, M, Gtr, Keys, Pr, Co-W	2012
The Cult	Choice Of A Weapon	Cooking Vinyl	E	2012
Standing Shadows	Trilogy	Analog Kid Records	E, M	2012
Mads Langer	Behold	Sony Music Ent.	P, E	2011
Spindrift	Classic Soundtracks Vol. 1	Xemu	E, M	2011
Left On Red	Tracks	Independent	P, E, M	2011
Various Artists	The Music Inside: A Collaboration Dedicated To Waylon Jennings Vol. 1	Scatter Records	P, E, M	2011
The Little Stevies	Attention Shoppers	MGM	P, E, M	2010
Jeremy Silver	Everybody Knows	Independent	P, E, M	2010
Ultra Violet Lights	Here In Filth	Command	M	2010
Gram Rabbit	Miracles And Metaphors	Royal Order	P, E, M, Vocs, Gtr, Keys, Pr, Co-W	2010
Gwendolyn	Bright Light	Whispersquish	P, E, M	2010
Gwendolyn& The Good Time Gang	Clap Your Hands	Whispersquish	P, E, M	2010
Rose's Pawn Shop	Dancing On The Gallows	Independent	P, E, M	2010
Brant Bjork	Gods And Goddesses	Low Desert Punks	P, E, M	2010
The 88	No One Here	Independent	P, E, M	2010
Levi Smith	Close Enough	Scatter Records	P, E, M, Gtr, Keys,	2010
Better Than Ezra	Closer re-release with bonus tracks	Ezra Dry Goods	P, E, M, Vocs	2009
Better Than Ezra	Plays Paper Empire	Ezra Dry Goods	P, E,	2009
Jules Larson	Strangers	Independent	P, E, M	2009
Jalopy	Right Where You Begin	Independent	P, E, M	2009
Oh Halo	Beautiful Egg for the movie Bliss	Independent	P, E, M, Vocs, Gtr, Keys, Pr, Co-W	2009
Mumiy Troll	Comrade Ambassador	Independent	P, E, M	2009
Tim Finn	The Conversation	EMI	P, E, M	2008
No Love Letters	No Love Letters	Independent	P, E, M	2008
I See Hawks In L.A.	Hallowed Ground	Big Book	M	2008
Various Artists	Soundtrack for the film Coming Home	Scatter Records	M	2008
Oh Halo	Beautiful Egg	Independent	P, E, M, Vocs, Gtr, Keys, Pr, Co-W	2007
The Forward	Nothing But Teeth	Independent	P, E, M	2007
A Static Lullaby	A Static Lullaby Live	Fearless	E	2007
The Rinse	The Rinse, Sir?	Independent	P, E, M	2007
Donita Sparks	Transmiticate	Independent	P, E, M, Gtr	2007
Gram Rabbit	Radio Angel And The Robot Beat	Royal Order	P, E, M, Vocs, Gtr, Keys, Pr, Co-W	2007
The Very Be Careful	Salad Buey	Downtown Pijao	E, M	2007
The 88	Coming Home for nationwide Sears commercial	Sears	P, E, M	2007
The 88	No One Here for Fox TV show How I Met Your Mother	Fox	P, E, M	2007
The 88	Good Feeling for Fox TV show How I Met Your Mother	Fox	P, E, M	2006
The 88	Crazy Little Thing Called Love for the film Failure To Launch	Paramount	P, E, M	2006
The 88	Get It Back for Fox TV show Free Ride	Fox	P, E, M	2006
Gram Rabbit	Cultivation	Stinky	P, E, M, Vocs, Gtr, Keys, Pr	2006
The 88	Over And Over	Mutron	P, E, M	2005
The Very Be Careful	Ńacas	Actual	E, M	2005
50 Foot Wave	Golden Ocean	Throwing Music/4AD	P, E, M	2005
Better Than Ezra	Before The Robots	Artemis	P, E,	2005
The Dark Horse Project	Dark Horse	Independent	M	2004
Pleasure Club	The Fugitive Kind	Brash	P, E, M	2004
Gram Rabbit	Music To Start A Cult To	Stinky	P, E, M, Pr	2004
50 Foot Wave	Fifty Foot Wave	Throwing Music/4AD	P, E, M	2004
The Peels	Sessions	Independent	P, E, M	2004
Throwing Muses	Speed And Sleep Live DVD	4AD	P, E, M	2004
Wan Santo Condo	Wan Santo Condo	Everloving/ Universal	P, E, M, Gtr, Vocs	2004
Better Than Ezra	Live In New Orleans DVD/Album	Sanctuary	E, M	2004
Fried	Fried	WEA/London Records	E, Pr	2004
Patty Griffin	Impossible Dream	Interscope	E	2004
Pleasure Club	Live At The Howling Wolf	Brash	P, E, M	2003
Throwing Muses	Throwing Muses	4AD	M	2003
Better Than Ezra	Closer	Beyond	P, E, M, Vocs	2002
Dave Pirner	Faces And Names	Ultimatum	E	2001
Galactic	We Love 'Em Tonight	Volcano	E	2001
Counting Crows	Soundtrack song for the film Smile	Universal	M	2000
Joe Henry	Fuse	Mammoth	E	1999
Splendid	Have You Got A Name For It	Mammoth	E	1999
Kristin Hersh	Sky Motel	4AD	E	1999
Tricky	Angels With Dirty Faces	Island	E	1997
Jimi Hendrix and The Band Of Gypsies	Live At the Filmore East	MCA	E	1997
Jason Falkner	Can You Still Feel	Elektra	E	1997
Luscious Jackson	Fever In, Fever Out	Grand Royal/Capitol	E	1996
Midnight Oil	Breathe	Sony	Piano	1996

P- Production, E- Engineering, M- Mixing, Pr- Programming, Gtr- Guitar, Co-W- Co-Writing
