= Maymi =

Maymi may refer to:

- Mayaimi or Maymi
- Ricky Maymi
