= The Legend of God's Gun =

2007 film

- Theatrical release poster
- Directed by: Mike Bruce
- Screenplay by: Mike Bruce
- Story by: Kirpatrick Thomas
- Starring: Kirpatrick Thomas; Bobby Bones; Dave Koenig; Mike Bruce; Julie Patterson
- Narrated by: Joseph Campanella
- Music by: Kirpatrick Thomas
- Distributed by: Indican Pictures
- Release date: August 25, 2007
- Running time: 78 minutes
- Country: United States
- Language: English

The Legend of God's Gun is a 2007 American independent Western film celebrating the tradition of Western films and the spirit of Rock and Roll. The film is based on the psychedelic Western album of the same name by the band Spindrift—the album having preceded the production of the film by a number of years.

== Plot ==
A gun-slinging preacher returns to the debaucherous town of Playa Diablo seeking revenge from the notorious scorpion-venom drinking bandito El Sobero, a descendant of a disciple of King Tavatta—the Scorpion King from the ancient world. El Sobero and his band of bad banditos are also returning to Playa Diablo seeking their own revenge against the town sheriff for putting a bounty on their heads and subsequently shooting all of their horses. With the Bounty Hunter dragging up slowly behind there is sure to be a confrontation of Biblical proportions as they all meet in the circle of death. This is The Legend Of God's Gun.

== Shooting locations ==
- Death Valley
- Pioneertown, California
- Hollywood Hills
