= Bobby Bones (musician) =

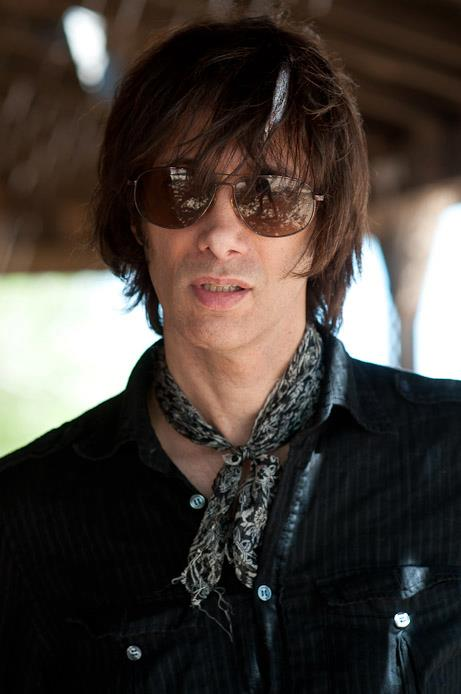

Background information
- Origin: Los Angeles, California, U.S.
- Genres: Psychedelic pop, noise pop, avant-garde, psychedelic rock, garage punk
- Occupation(s): Musician, singer
- Instrument(s): Vocals, bass, guitar, slide guitar, piano
- Years active: 1982–present

Bobby Bones is an American musician based in Los Angeles. He first emerged onto the music scene in the early 1980s with punk rock band The Mau Maus and after 1985 was with Demolition Gore Galore.

After a 10-year break, he returned with another punk rock band the Flesh Eaters. Bobby then went on to be in garage rock band The Morlocks, and psychedelic rock band Spindrift.

His acting debut was a role in the 2008, American independently produced film The Legend of God's Gun in which he played a gun-slinging preacher returning to the debaucherous town of Playa Diablo seeking revenge from the notorious scorpion-venom drinking bandito El Sobero.

Bobby is a member of The Silver Chords and also of Sky Parade who will be embarking on a west coast tour later in the year with Mark Gardener from Ride.
