= Zachary Hansen =

American drummer

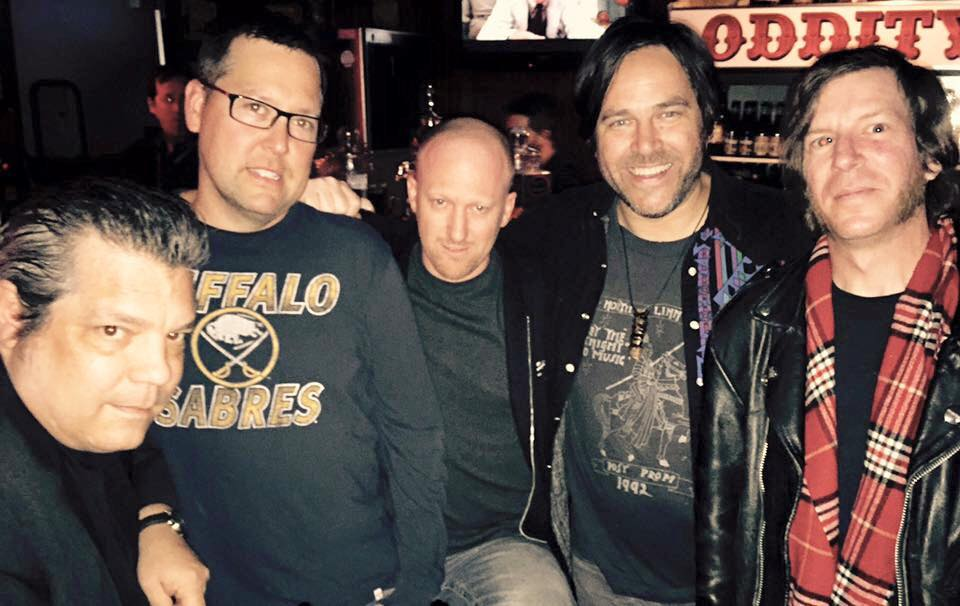
- Oddity Bar 2015 with the immortal Danny Albert, Paul Budd, Corey GladHeFelter and Kirpatrick Thomas

Background information
- Born: August 19, 1972 (age 54)
- Origin: Salt Lake City, Utah, United States
- Genres: Indie rock
- Occupation: Musician/Engineer
- Instrument: Drums
- Years active: 19
- Label: DropHit

Zachary Hansen is the former drummer for such Newark, Delaware bands as Jake and the Stiffs, Medicine Man (and the sexy new illusion), Raised on Sugar, Spindrift, and D.Machine among other appearances on numerous Mid-Atlantic region recordings with such bands as The Stone Road Stalkers, Blue Water, and The Sonny Mishra Project. In 1993 Zachary along with partner Eric Teather founded Manic Music Recording Studio, recording such acts an Ellemmenno, Spindrift, and Homegrown. In 1994 he along with partner Steve Funk founded one of the first mp3 websites featuring free music and news, drophit.com which later turned into DropHit Records producing numerous albums, compilation releases and promoting musicians worldwide. Hansen went on to own and operate a dot com data company based in Las Vegas, Nevada and is currently writing/recording music with Former Jake and The Stiffs front man Randy America. Starting in 2013 he served as the Director of Connected Devices at the largest North American music distribution company Music Choice overseeing all customer facing web/mobile/stb music platforms working in the first of its kind "real-time streaming video channels" allowing multiple users to watch synch-streamed music videos. In 2015 he began work on a revamp of DropHit.com – iAmRadioWorld.com showcasing independent music from around the world.

== Jake and the Stiffs ==
Hansen is the second drummer, coming into the lineup in 1991, after Randy America relocated the project punk rock band, Jake and the Stiffs, from Detroit to Newark, Delaware. Hansen has appeared on numerous Jake and the Stiffs recordings including Love So Deep and Steal This Record. Hansen left the band in 1994, and later returned to the lineup for random reunion appearances and recordings.

== Spindrift ==
Hansen is the second drummer of the music line-up of the neo-psychedelic rock band Spindrift, stepping in after Paul Budd and Chris Andrews left the band in 1999. Along with members Rob Campanella, Bobby Bones (from Psychic TV), Dave Koenig and band leader Kirpatrick Thomas, the band took on a new music direction to that of their original experimental style, playing psychedelic music inspired by the spirit of the Old West as mythologized by Western Cinema; Spaghetti Westerns in particular. As a member of Spindrift, Zachary appeared on the 2001 release 'We Come From the United States', recorded and produced by Bon Jovi writer/producer Bill Grabowski.

In 2002 Zachary relocated to Las Vegas to re-join the Spindrift members. During this time he recorded with Kirpatrick Thomas on the 2007 Spindrift release Songs From The Ancient Age, which featured new material along with material from earlier recordings Kirpatrick and Hansen had done together.

Hansen continues to play with Spindrift when available on tour and in reunion gigs.

== Other projects ==
That same year Hansen discovered a somewhat unknown band traveling through the Vegas scene known as The Killers. The band frequented such venues as the Double Down Saloon, The Rock, and The Palupa Lounge. After much convincing, the band was offered an opening gig with The Brian Jonestown Massacre in Las Vegas and was subsequently signed to Lizard Records (now renamed Marrakesh Records).

In 2009 Hansen alongside 2 co-authors wrote and published "The Deal Breakers: A COLLECTION OF SHORT, INFORMATIVE TIPS FOR MEN" which was used as the basis for the writing of "Dealbreakers Talk Show #0001".

Kirpatrick and drummer Z. Miles Hansen invented the “Hansen Guitar Mic”, essentially a cheap microphone routed and wired into his guitar with an on/off switch enabling vocals and feedback through guitar effects. Earlier 90's albums by Spindrift include the heavier but catchy debut Strange Range(1996), the Hawkwind influenced We Come From the United States(1999), and the space-punk upbeat sound of 10 Million Asians Can't Be Wrong! (2000) which featured the Hansen Mic.
