= Furnace Creek Fault Zone =

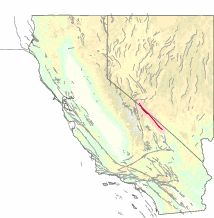
The Furnace Creek Fault Zone in eastern California

The Furnace Creek Fault Zone (FCFZ) is a geological fault that is located in Eastern California and southwestern Nevada. The right lateral-moving (dextral) fault extends for some 200 km (120 mi) between a connection with the Death Valley Fault Zone in the Amargosa Valley and northward to a termination in the Fish Lake Valley of southwest Nevada. The northern segment of the FCFZ is also referred to as the Fish Lake Valley Fault Zone. The FCFZ is considered an integral part of the Walker Lane.
