= Burke Roberts =

American film director

Burke Roberts is an American underground film director and multimedia artist. His work has been exhibited at numerous international film festivals, fine art galleries, museums and independent cinemas.

== Early life ==
Roberts grew up on a ranch in Fort Collins, Colorado. At eighteen, Roberts came to Hollywood and acted extensively in television and film. His performances of note include Vincent Gallo's "Brown Bunny" and "NYPD Blue". He studied the Meisner Teqnique primarily with William Alderson, under the eye of Sanford Meisner during his declining years. In the late 1990s he stopped acting to shift his focus entirely to filmmaking and art installation.

== Director ==
Moving behind the camera in the mid 1990s, Roberts' work as a director has received international acclaim in some part due to his unique DIY high-production values. He has been profiled in an eclectic array of cultural publications including a feature interview on Suicidegirls.com, Film Threat Magazine, Tank Magazine London, cover story for Cinetrange Paris, multiple articles in his hometown periodicals – Los Angeles Times and L.A. Weekly and many more. In order to realize his work, Roberts formed "The Bizzurke Army Underground Film Militia," (also known as "Bizarrmy") a network of artists and technicians who devote their time and talents pro bono to his productions. His films deal with challenging themes, such as oppression, fanaticism and extreme circumstances. His first film "Jesus Rides Shotgun" gained a cult following and began an expanding body of challenging short works: "Handicap City", "Echo Of A Man", "Insult To Injury", "Some of An Equation", "Substance Ovuse", and "Sky Drops" - All of which have played in dozens of cities and countries due to Roberts unique approach of touring his films in a tradition historically practiced by independent musicians.

== Films ==
A 'large scale guerrilla film' that takes place in the height of the great depression with train hoppers. This film screened in Paris, London, Barcelona, Berlin and many more. It received an award for 'Best Cinematography' at the Downtown Los Angeles Film Festival and screened in the Short Film Corner of the 2006 Cannes Film Festival.

- Another of his decorated accomplishments is the film "Some of An Equation" (2007) - filmed in one single shot. "Some of An Equation" gained critical acclaim all over the world, receiving awards including 'Best foreign short' in Madrid, 'Innovation in Cinema award' at Vision Fest - Tribeca and was the opening film at Slamdance Film Festival '08 the piece went on to almost 2 dozen more international festivals including San Francisco International Shorts Film Festival, Boston Underground Film Festival, Expression En Corto (Mexico), Fantastic Fest, Oldenburg, and many others.
- "Handicap City" (2002) was written, directed and designed by Roberts and DP'd by Frank Buyers A.S.C. Combining elements of German Expressionism and graffiti art, the film is not as much a typical narrative as a multi-sensory painting, set in motion by the writings of a man who is trapped in a Kafka-esque, visceral metaphor for "oppression in society." "Handicap City" also traveled domestically and abroad, from midnight screenings in independent cinemas to presentations at fine art festivals and galleries, including Mama showroom (Art Rotterdam), The Horse Hospital (London), 8mm (Berlin), and others.

In March 2010 The Los Angeles County Museum of Art (LACMA) presented a full retrospective of Roberts work as the Midnight headliner of their annual Young Directors night.

== Music videos ==
Having avoided the music video arena for 15 years Roberts recently entered the genre - the first of which he directed was named in the top 50 music videos of 2010 by NME Magazine for Warpaint 'Stars'. Within his first year he directed videos for Swahili Blonde, Patrick Park, The Mccarricks, Sistol, Spindrift and Hollie Cook which premiered on such online venues as Pitchfork, NME, Paste Magazine and the Los Angeles Times.

== Art ==
In recent years he has expanded his ventures into large scale sculptures and installation art. His portable projection system, "The Engine" is a pioneering angle of Roberts' DIY practices. The work consists of a 2000-pound light and steel sculpture that kinetically supports a 17-foot screen. The transportable, self-contained exhibition system has been used as an alternative mode for distribution and presentation of alternative cinema. It debuted at The Architecture and Design Museum of Los Angeles and was shown at NASA, Tesla Motors Showroom, Burning Man and Coachella. Roberts also curated and produced a unique art festival in Los Angeles called Engine CollisionFest. The festival includes novelists, poets, performance artists, fashionistas, musicians, creators of new media and practitioners of cinema. Participants included Cory McAbee ("The American Astronaut"), creators of Adult Swim's Metalocalypse, Wu-Tang Clan's Raekwon and Warhol Superstar Cherry Vanilla. He continues to program and curate for other festivals and galleries - including Competition features and the Anarchy shorts program for Slamdance Film Festival in Park City Utah.

== Filmography ==
- Jesus Rides Shotgun (47 min.) - 1997
- Fuck Fashion (18 min.) - 1999
- Handicap City (17 min.) - 2003
- Echo of a Man (16 min.) - 2004
- Insult to Injury (29 min.) - 2005
- Some of an Equation (8 min.) - 2007
- Substance Ovuse (5 min.) - 2008
- Sky Drops (14 min.) - 2009
- Engineering Nudes (6 min.) - 2009
- Legend of the Widower Colby Wallace (15 min.) - 2010/11
- The Exquisite Tenderness of Santa Rosa de Lima (27 min.) – in production - 2011/2012

=== Music videos ===
- Warpaint 'Stars' − 2010
- The Mccarricks 'Metamorph' − 2010
- Patrick Park 'You'll get Over' − 2010
- Swahili Blonde 'La Mampatee' − 2010
- Sistol 'A better Shore' − 2011
- Spindrift 'Legend of the Widower' – 2011
- Hollie Cook 'Walking in the Sand' – 2011
- Swahili Blonde 'Purple Ink' – 2011
- Brass Tax 'Man with the Tooth' − 2011
- Corridor 'Pieces of Work' − 2011
