= Meredith Artley =

American journalist

Meredith Artley is an American journalist and former editor-in-chief of CNN.com.

== Biography ==
She has served as elected president of the Online News Association, and on their board of directors. Before joining CNN, she led digital editorial efforts for the Los Angeles Times, the International Herald Tribune and The New York Times. She is a graduate of the University of Missouri.
