= Garlock Fault =

Seismic fault in California, United States

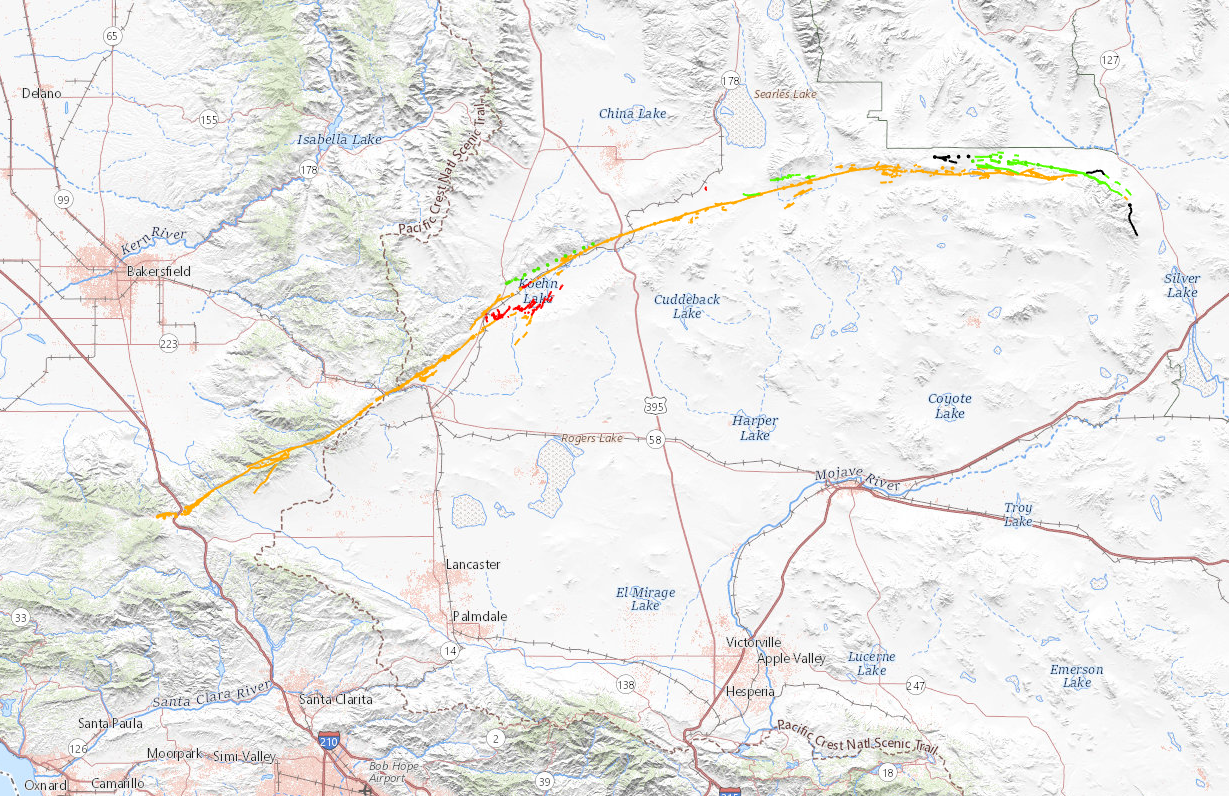
Garlock Fault Zone map

The Garlock Fault is a left-lateral strike-slip fault running northeast–southwest along the north margins of the Mojave Desert of Southern California, for much of its length along the southern base of the Tehachapi Mountains.

== Geography ==
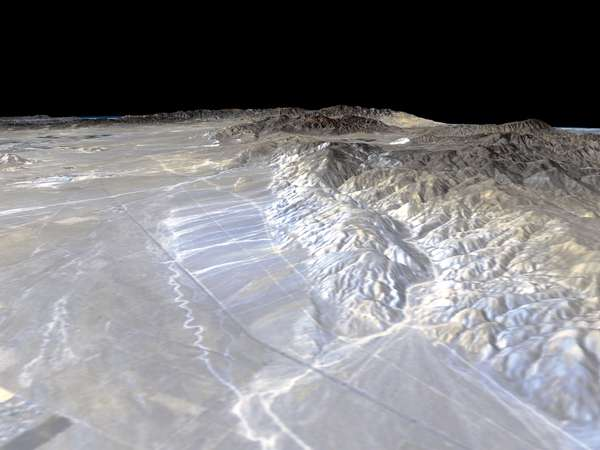
Perspective view of Garlock Fault

Stretching for 250 kilometers (160 mi), it is the second-longest fault in California, and one of the most prominent geological features in the southern part of the state. It marks the northern boundary of the area known as the Mojave Block, as well as the southern ends of the Sierra Nevada and the valleys of the westernmost Basin and Range province.

The Garlock Fault runs from a junction with the San Andreas Fault in the Antelope Valley, eastward to a junction with the Death Valley Fault Zone in the eastern Mojave Desert. It is named after the historic mining town of Garlock, founded in 1894 by Eugene Garlock and now a ghost town. Relatively few communities lie directly along the Garlock, as it is primarily situated in the desert, with Frazier Park, Tehachapi, Mojave, and Johannesburg being the closest to it.

== Geology ==
The Garlock Fault is believed to have developed to accommodate the strain between the extensional tectonics of the Great Basin crust and the right lateral strike-slip faulting of the Mojave Desert crust.

Unlike most of the other faults in California, slip on the Garlock Fault is left-lateral; that is, the land on the other side of the fault moves to the left from the perspective of someone facing the fault. Thus, the terrain north of the fault is moving westward and that on the south is moving eastward.

== Activity ==
The Garlock Fault moves at a rate of between 2 and 11 mm a year, with an average slip of around 7 millimeters. While most of the fault is locked, certain segments have been shown to move by aseismic creep, which is motion without resulting earthquakes.

The Garlock is not considered to be a particularly active fault, seldom producing any shaking detectable by humans, although it has been known to generate sympathetic seismic events when triggered by other earthquakes and in one instance by the removal of ground water. These events, as well as continuing microearthquake activity and the state of the scarps from previous ruptures, do indicate that the Garlock will produce another major quake at some point in the future.

A study published in October 2019 in the journal Science indicated that a part of the Garlock fault slipped after being triggered by the series of earthquakes in the Ridgecrest area which occurred in July 2019. Reports in the Los Angeles Times indicated that a magnitude 8 earthquake along the Garlock fault would have the potential for grave disaster.

The last significant ruptures on the Garlock were thought to be in the years 1050 AD and 1500 AD. Research has pinned the interval between significant ruptures on the Garlock as being anywhere between 200 and 3,000 years, depending on the segment of the fault. The most recent notable event in the Garlock Fault Zone was a magnitude 5.7 near the town of Mojave on July 11, 1992. It is thought to have been triggered by the Landers earthquake, just two weeks earlier. However, no surface slippage of the fault itself had been recorded in modern times until 2019. Following a series of earthquakes on nearby minor faults in late July 2019, the Garlock Fault was observed moving about 2 cm (0.8 in) between July and October accompanied by numerous minor earthquakes, a state known as fault creep, and producing a bulge in land observed by satellite radar images.
