= Mad Planet =

Mad Planet was an indie electronic rock band from Silverlake, California, consisting of Cooper Gillespie (bass/vocals), Greg Gordon (drums, sequences) and Tony Crouse (guitars, keys). Mad Planet was formed in 2009. Their debut album, All Elephants, was released in 2010. The record garnered them a position in the CMJ Top 200 charts. In 2011 the band released an EP, Gliese 581g. Following, their most recent published album, Ghost Notes, was released in 2012.

The band has been featured in Filter Magazine (Discovering the Undiscovered) , CMJ.com (Sonicbids Spotlight Artist), Deli Magazine (named as one of Los Angeles' best new artists), Consequence of Sound and BMI.com (Indie Spotlight Artist).

After Mad Planet, Gillespie and Gordon started a new band, called Ultra Violent Rays. Later they moved to Landers and formed another band, named Landroids. Tony Crouse continued his career as independent songwriter and producer.

== Discography ==
- Ghost Notes (2012)
- Gliese 581g EP (2011)
- All Elephants (2010)
