= Death Valley Fault Zone =

Geologic fault in eastern California, US

The Death Valley Fault Zone (DVFZ) is a right lateral-moving (dextral) geologic fault in eastern California. It runs from a connection with the Furnace Creek Fault Zone in the Amargosa Valley southward to a junction with the Garlock Fault. It is considered an integral part of the Walker Lane.
