= Brad Artley =

American-based rock drummer

- Died: 2025 San Diego
- Genres: Rock, post-punk
- Occupation: Drummer
- Instrument: Drums
- Years active: 1996–2001
- Formerly of: The Brian Jonestown Massacre

Brad Artley was an American rock drummer.

== The Brian Jonestown Massacre ==
Brad Artley was a member and drummer for the neo-psychedelic rock band, The Brian Jonestown Massacre (abbreviated to 'The BJM'), in 1996-1997. Artley did not play on any of the band's albums, but did perform on tours with them.

He appears in the acclaimed rock documentary DiG! by Ondi Timoner, chronicling The BJM and friends/rivals, alternative rock band, The Dandy Warhols' early careers over the course of seven years.

Artley could be recognised for his Brian Jones-style, blonde hair.

== The Richmond Sluts ==
Artley was the drummer for the rock & roll band, The Richmond Sluts, signed to indie label, Disaster Records.

He played drums on the band's self-titled first album, The Richmond Sluts, but then left the band soon after.

== Discography ==
=== with The Richmond Sluts ===
- The Richmond Sluts (2001) Disaster Records
