= Experimental Health =

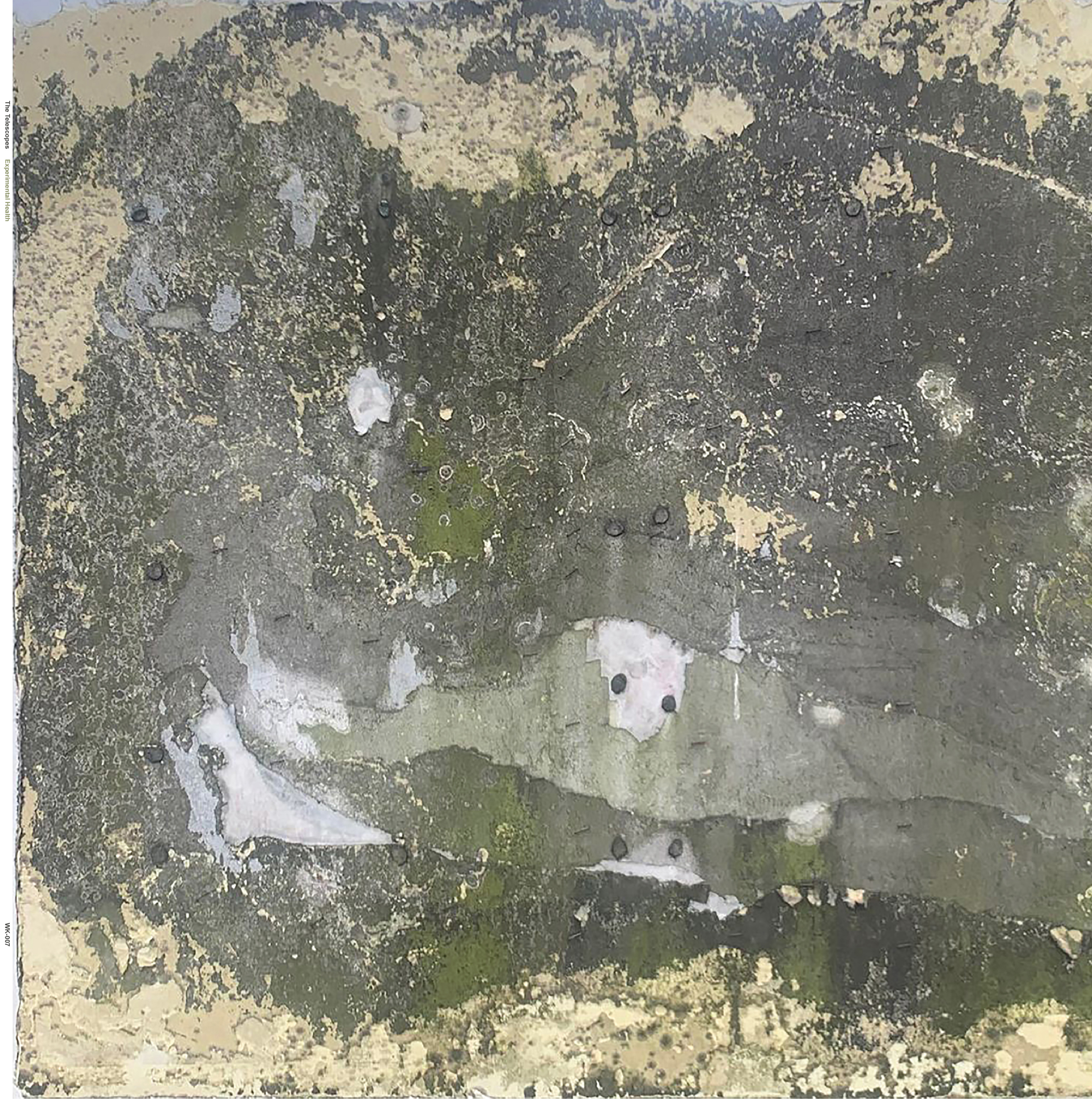

Studio album by The Telescopes
- Released: 24 February 2023
- Genre: Alternative rock; Drone; Electronica; Electropop; Experimental; Folk; Minimal; Noise rock; Psychedelia; Shoegaze; Space rock
- Length: 38 minutes
- Label: Weisskalt Records

Professional ratings
Aggregate scores
Source	Rating
Metacritic	81/100
Review scores
Source	Rating
Under The Radar	8.5/10
Uncut Magazine	8/10
Beats Per Minute	81/100
Classic Rock	6/10
The Wee Review	4/5
Perkele.it	8.5/10
Vayat Music	5/5
Discogs	3.7/5
Scene Point Blank	9/10

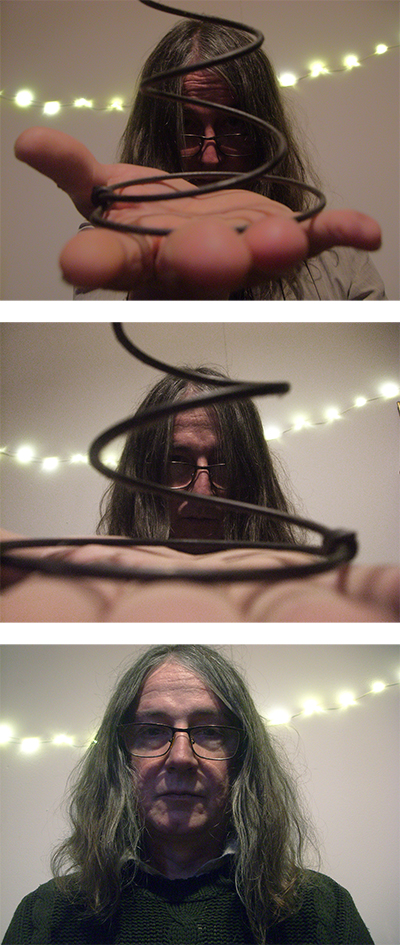
Stephen Lawrie (The Telescopes) Press Shots for Experimental Health, 2023.

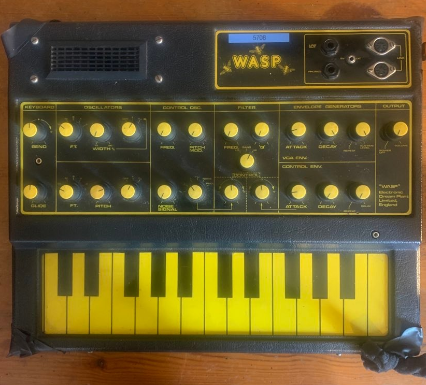
EDP Wasp (1970's analogue synthesizer) used on the album.

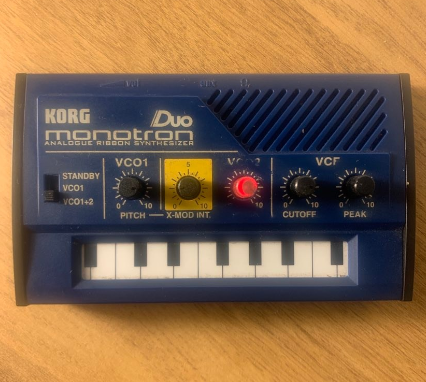
Korg Monotron Duo (analogue ribbon synthesizer) used on the album.

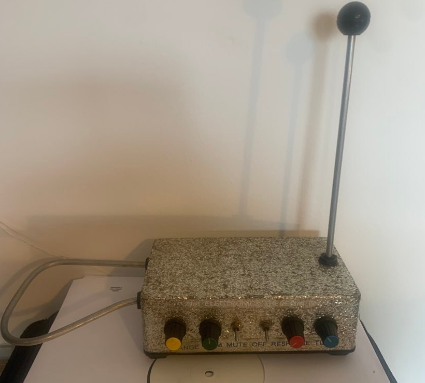
Theremin built by Tony Henk in 1962, used on the album.

Experimental Health is the fourteenth studio album by English noise rock band The Telescopes. It was released on February 24, 2023, by Weisskalt Records who also reissued their previous albums Third Wave and #4.

It is a continuation of the band pushing its own boundaries with its music overlapping a multitude of genres and following its own inspiration-led course.

== Background ==
The album was created entirely independently by Stephen Lawrie in a remote cottage in West Yorkshire between January and May 2022. During this period, Lawrie felt reality was bent out of shape and wanted to document the experience sonically and lyrically.

Lawrie considers Experimental Health to be "folk music made with broken toys and cheap synths – mostly Pocket Operators and miniature synths". There are no guitars present on the album with most of the instrumentation costing £50 or less. However the musical process was not only just keeping to a specific set of instruments but also exacting a substantial amount of crushing and sound degradation to the tracks to elicit a certain kind of resolution, radiating a dark, abrasive yet ethereal energy.

The songs are reflective of the individual's connection to their own mind, body and spirit (health) and personal autonomy in the environment of decay, duress and medical intervention.

To reinforce some of the central health themes in the record, lyrical references were made to Edward 'Diogenese' McKenzie, a vagrant who found a place with the visual artist Robert Lenkiewicz.

Aside from vocals, the list of music gear includes:

- Cassiotone MT 400V
- EDP Wasp
- Finger Piano
- Korg Monotron Delay
- Korg Monotron Duo
- Penny Whistle
- Pocket Operator Factory
- Pocket Operator Office
- Pocket Operator Sub
- Stylophone
- Theremin

== Concept ==
The album was conceived and written during the COVID-19 lockdowns and was a partial response to the UK Government's handling of Public Health and Safety during that period.

In an interview with It's Psychedelic Baby! Magazine's Klemen Breznikar, Lawrie says, "45e is the clause protecting us all from being forced to undergo medical procedures. When I heard the government was looking at amending that clause, the words 'Drugs so awesome they have to force them' came into my head and the song grew from there." The track 45e was written in approximately half an hour with the instrumental section slightly echoing the melody to Nowhere To Run by Martha Reeves and the Vandellas.

Furthering the bodily integrity line of thought, Laurie expressed scepticism over particular medical practices which either reduced or removed the autonomy of patients, "'Repetitive Brain Injury' was inspired by an old saying about dementia. 'Let him wander, let him roam, always something will bring him back home.' Dementia has its own routine, you can't lockdown a demented mind. You have to let it wander. I was thinking about how sometimes it can be harmful to enforce safety."

With the objective of creating a dissonant and eerie sonic environment to match the disturbing nature of the subject, Lawrie imposed intentional limitations around almost exclusively using battered electronic equipment. For example, with the Korg Monotron Duo (analogue ribbon synthesizer), Lawrie explains, "this is a miniature synth that I played with a pen. It was used to create the pulses on The Turns and the descending pitch bends on 45e. Some of the counter melodies to the basic chord structures were also put together on this. It's quite difficult to play with the fingers but it has a great tone and the X.Mod feature can provide some interesting variations, I used that to get the pulses. Pulses and bleeps were what I heard in my head when I came up with the album title. They seemed to suggest the necessary environment for the overall concept of Experimental Health."

The creative decision to use minimal instrumentation was also done so with the ethos that an artist can work with anything, including limitation and still find inspiration.

== Album art ==
To subtly represent the evanescence of living, an abandoned road sign worn out by the weather and lightly layered with moss was photographed and cropped to create the atmospheric album artwork. The action of elevating the found object (objet trouvé) to album art was a tacit iteration of the modern art practice of readymades but recontextualised and hidden within neo psychedelic, noise and experimental music.

Lawrie's selection of visual art is tangentially threaded to the ongoing arts and culture dialogue surrounding what is taste in aesthetics, what is art and how it ought to be made, these questions being in a permanent state of flux thus remaining open ended and unanswerable. Through the lens of conceptual art, the album artwork is reminiscent of an abstract plein air watercolour painting made in collaboration between human urban decay being met with non-human weather, designated as art through the decision of the artist.

In the way Lawrie's music requires repeated listens for the different aural layers to properly emerge to the listener, the origin of where the album art is from and the action behind choosing it, is a creative and conceptual liminal space waiting to be uncovered.

== Critical reception ==
Experimental Health has received ongoing positive reviews from numerous publications with praise for Lawrie's decades' long consistency in quality songwriting and revolutionary approach to musical composition and arrangement.

The album has been lauded as claustrophobic, expressive of isolation (see anomie) whilst simultaneously emanating the aura of the divine with the specifically selected instruments; the contrast working as a sonic paradox.

Under The Radar's Dom Gourlay asserts, "Stephen Lawrie has always maintained an artistic vision far beyond many of his peers and contemporaries so it shouldn't come as too much of a surprise that Experimental Health heralds yet another reinvention for The Telescopes."

Gonzaï Magazine's Robin Ecouer observes, "Even after 35 years of career, The Telescopes continues to break the ambient" and the record is "like Robert Wyatt on LSD".

Perkele.it's Alessandro Zoppo describes, "Between hallucinatory ballads and transcendent melodies, clanging, lo-fidelity buzzes and joyful psychotic touches, this work is a treasure trove of truly precious possessions. Battered only in appearance, unclassifiable yet accessible to a wide audience, Experimental Health is the photograph of a distorted reality and for this reason a sweetly and devilishly cathartic album. The year isn't over yet, but it's already rightfully among the best records of 2023."

The album was listed as a 2023 favourite by Scene Point Blank and included on Beats Per Minute's list of Most Anticipated Releases of 2023.

== Track listing ==
The vinyl release have tracks 1–4 on Side A and tracks 5–8 on Side B. A limited edition of 500 black vinyl was pressed by Sonic Wax (United Kingdom). All lyrics and music were written by Stephen Lawrie with mastering by Colin Tucker. The Turns and Because They Care were released as singles with glitching music videos by French Film Director Jean De Oliveira. The record was reissued in November 2023 with remixes by Black Market Karma and Mosaic Runes.

Experimental Health track listing
No.	Title	Length
1.	"Because They Care"	5:37
2.	"The Turns"	4:15
3.	"When I Hear The Sound"	4:03
4.	"Leave Nobody Behind"	4:51
5.	"45e"	6:02
6.	"Wrong Dimension"	4:50
7.	"Repetitive Brain Injury"	6:32
8.	"The Turns Again"	2:12
9.	"Leave Nobody Behind (Black Market Karma Remix)"	4:47
10.	"45e (Mosaic Runes Remix)"	5:10
