= Black Market Karma =

British rock band

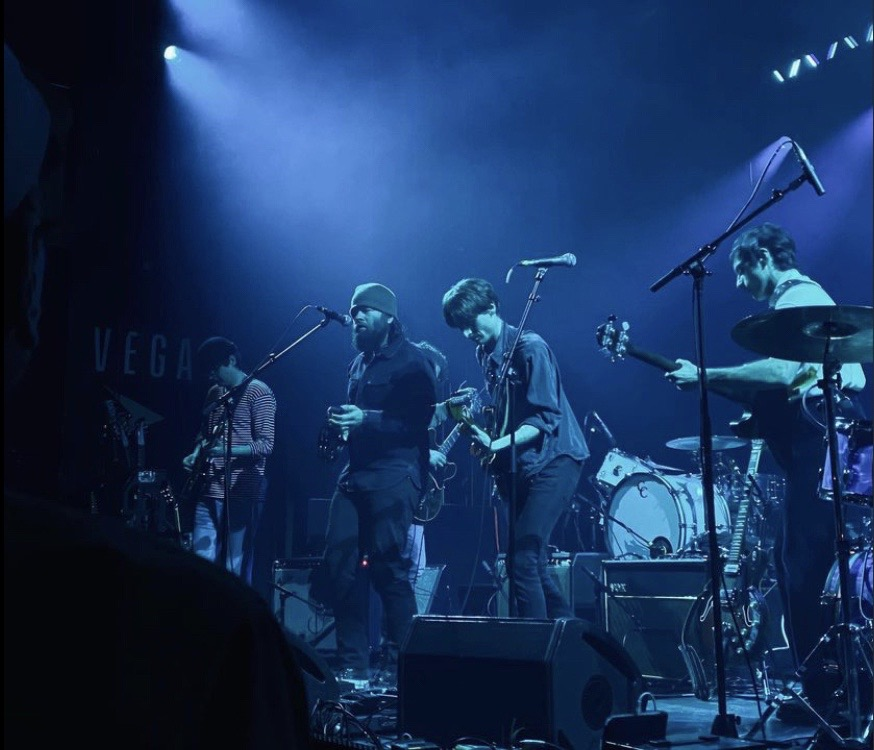
- Black Market Karma performing with Alex Maas from The Black Angels at VEGA in Copenhagen, Denmark, 2023.

Background information
- Origin: London, England
- Genres: Psychedelic rock; psychedelic pop; neo-psychedelia; Electronica; Lo-fi music; sitar
- Years active: 2011–present
- Labels: Flower Power; Fuzz Club; Sister 9 Recordings; Weisskalt Records
- Members: Stanley Belton; Finley Belton; Octave Meynieux; Matt Bruce
- Website: flowerpowerrecords.com

Black Market Karma is an English rock band from London, now residing in Dover, Kent. Formed in 2011, they are known for their prolific discography with 11 studio albums, including 1 collaborative album to date.

The band is led by primary songwriter and multi-instrumentalist Stanley Belton, who lived in the band’s own ‘Cocoon’ studio during the formative years; writing, performing, recording and self-producing these albums.

The music is rooted in 60’s guitar and pop, inclusive of Psychedelia and Fuzz Rock. Touches of Folk, Blues, Traditional Indian Music, Hip Hop and Lo Fi Electronica have been incorporated.

In 2015 they supported The Warlocks on their UK tour on the basis of recommendation. In 2023 they were invited to join The Black Angels on their European tour. Belton has collaborated with artists such as Sonic Boom, The Underground Youth and Tess Parks.

All instruments on the studio albums were performed and recorded by Belton at his home studio, including: 1960’s Vox Ultrasonic, Cheetah & Starstream XII Guitars, 1970’s Gibson ES 345 Guitar, Fender Jaguar & Jazzmaster Guitar, 1960’s Epiphone Rivoli Bass, Sitar, 1970’s Rogers Drumkit, Mellotron, Mini Moog Synthesiser, Harmonium, Vocals and Percussion.

Belton is noted for the use of undisclosed open tunings, with the members of the live band often switching guitars to accommodate these tunings during live performances.

== History ==
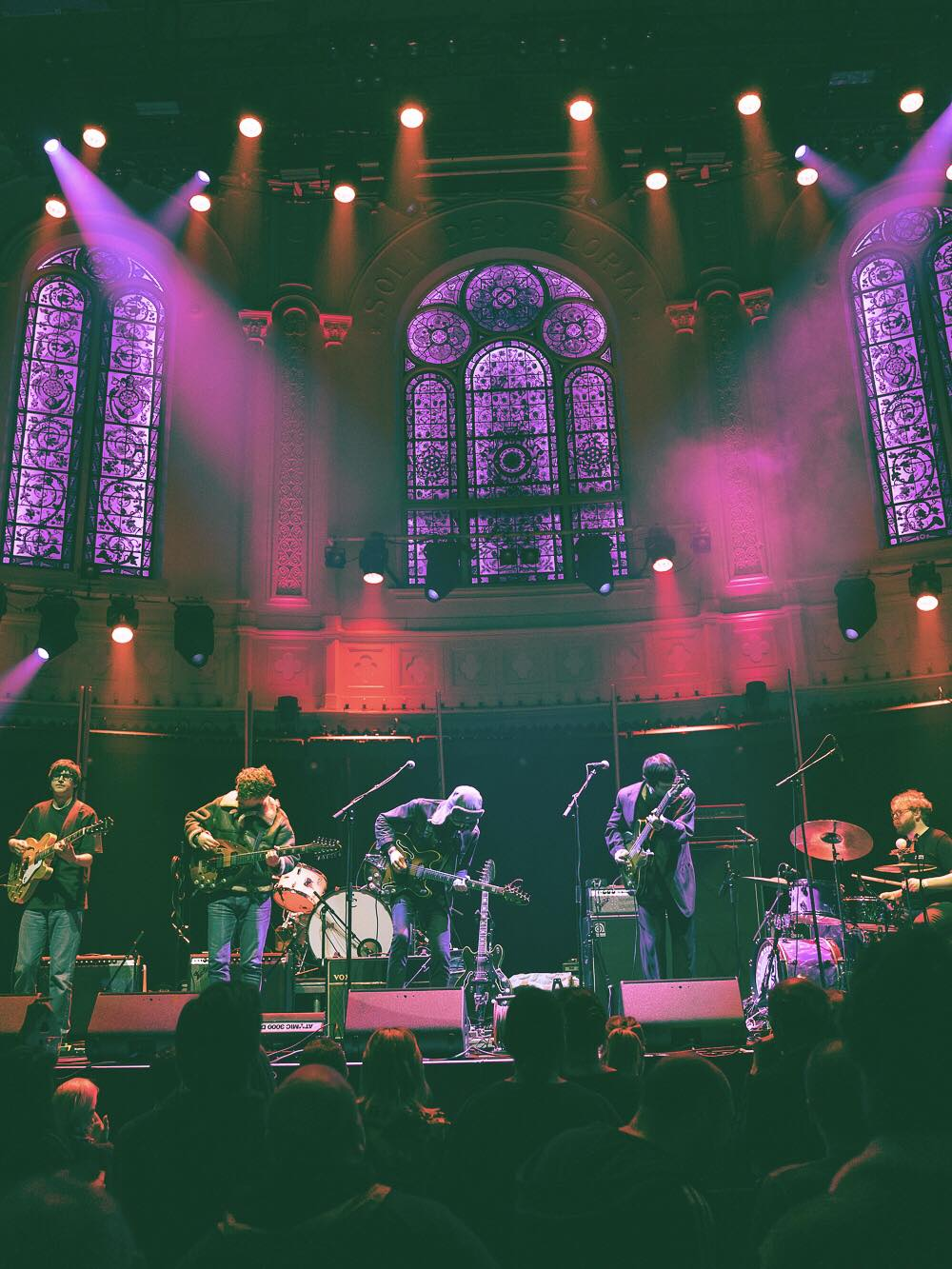
Black Market Karma performing at Paradiso in Amsterdam, The Netherlands, 2023.

In 2012 Black Market Karma released 4 studio albums, starting with their debut Comatose, followed by Cocoon, Easy Listening and Semper Fi. These albums were marketed by making them available as free downloads via the English record label Flower Power.

Comatose was featured on the psychedelic rock YouTube channel Captain Beefart, helping the band gain their initial following.

The track Weightless was also featured on the compilation The Reverb Conspiracy Volume 1 released in 2012 by Fuzz Club Records.

In the following years, the band toured Europe extensively, including multiple runs of dates with Tess Parks and Joakim Ahlund’s musical project Les Big Byrd.

They have performed at festivals including but not limited to The Liverpool International Festival of Psychedelia 2012, Cosmosis Festival of Psychedelia Manchester 2015, Lisbon Psych Fest 2015 and Phantasmagoria 2021 in Liverpool. This resulted in being included on a vinyl compilation Phantasmagoria Volume 1 released by Sister 9 Recordings.

== Recent releases ==
=== The Technicolour Liquid Audio Machine (2021) ===
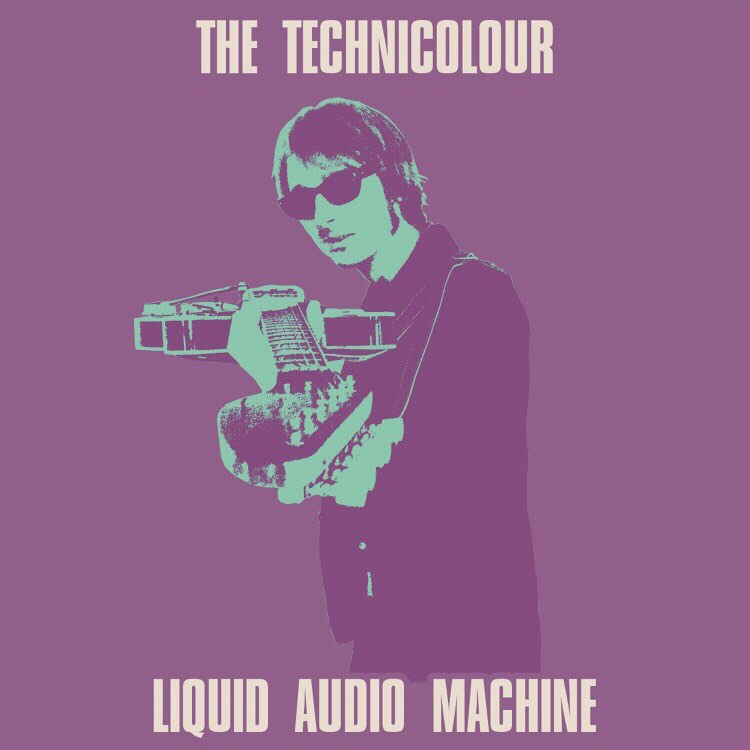
Black Market Karma - The Technicolour Liquid Audio Machine Album Cover Art.

This album departs from the recording techniques of the rest of the band’s catalogue. It is fully instrumental aside from several spoken vocal samples consisting mainly of Belton’s Grandfather William 'Bill' Proud, whom it was made in tribute to.

It is the only Black Market Karma album without guitar. Belton was in between residences at the time, with the majority of the band’s equipment in temporary storage. This led him to using new techniques with limited equipment during this period. For example, he was unable to record live drums for this album and turned to sampling; editing his own previous recordings to build new drum parts for the songs.

In an interview with It's Psychedelic, Baby Magazine's Klemen Breznikar, Belton confers, "There were originally no vocals because I didn’t have the equipment to do them but after a while I realised that it was working great that way. Something free from language and that as a listener, you have to meet half way and let yourself get lost in. A definite departure for me and probably the most atmospheric Black Market Karma record.

=== Aped Flair & Hijacked Ideas (2022) ===
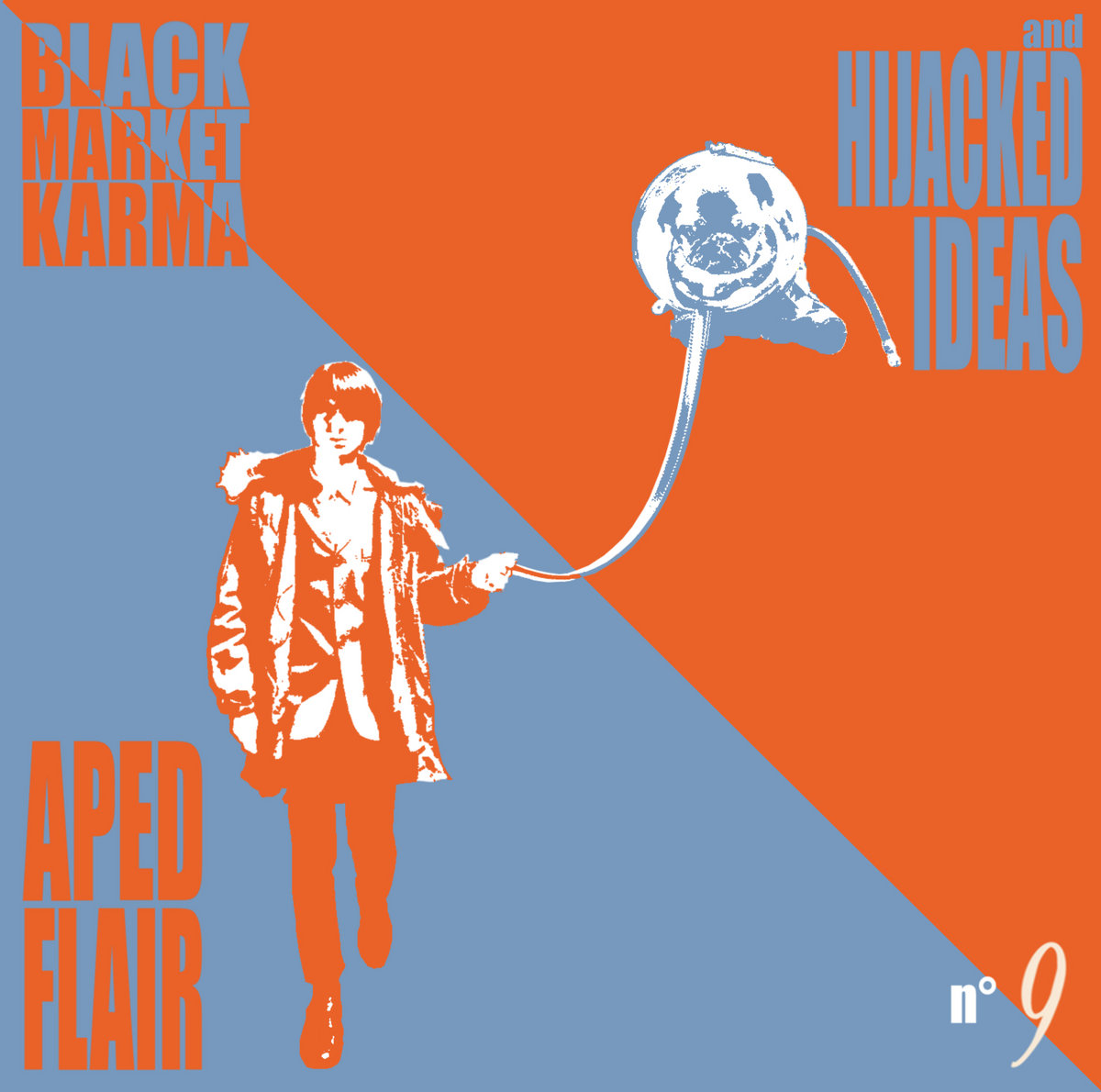
Black Market Karma - Aped Flair & Hijacked Ideas Album Cover Art.

The album returns to their guitar-based sound featuring vocals on the majority of the songs since their 2016 release Animal Jive.

It further expanded on the 1960s influenced psychedelic pop sound, first touched upon in the song Shaking Sad from Animal Jive. Of this sound, Belton explains, “The last album is very much inspired by ’60s pop and other later bands that were also inspired by it. You know, sugary melodies and jangle but dished out with some real dirt. Loose, baggy beats, overdriven bass, crunchy guitars, and drunken keyboards, etc..”

The title of the album is a tongue-in-cheek acknowledgement to how no concept in art or music is truly original.

The closing track Ace’s Trip Through The Cosmic Ether is a tribute to Belton’s childhood family dog who is featured on the inside artwork of the vinyl release of the album.

Clash Magazine's Emma Harrison has described the album as “a bold and ambitious body of work; a cacophony of beguiling melodies, killer hooks and an abundance of playfully distorted wobble” with “influences of Dylan, the Beatles from their ‘White Album’ days and The Brian Jonestown Massacre.”

=== Friends in Noise (2023) ===
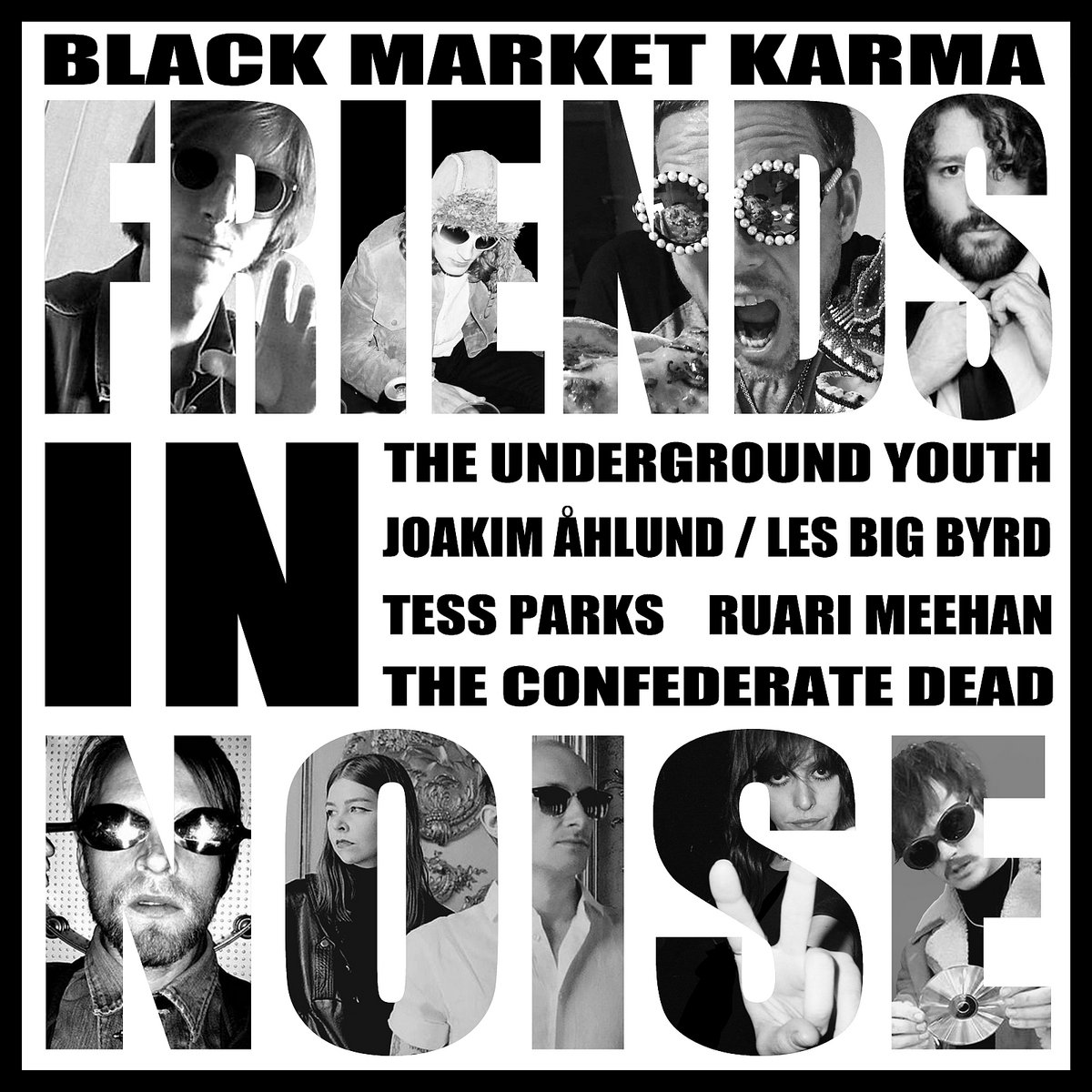
Black Market Karma - Friends In Noise Album Cover Art.

A collection of collaborations between the band and various artists featuring Joakim Ahlund, Les Big Byrd, Tess Parks, The Underground Youth, The Confederate Dead and Ruari Meehan.

Friends In Noise has received positive reviews from numerous publishers, including The Big Takeover's Dave Franklin who comments, “although Belton finds himself co-writing and collaborating with artists from across the musical spectrum, there is absolute consistency to the results, the album seemingly having one foot in a version of the sixties that didn't quite exist and the other striding forward into a new horizon yet to be fully realized. More than that, it all sounds, to a greater degree, like a Black Market Karma record, which must speak volumes about Stanley Belton’s exercise and control.”

=== The Sour Truth (2023) ===
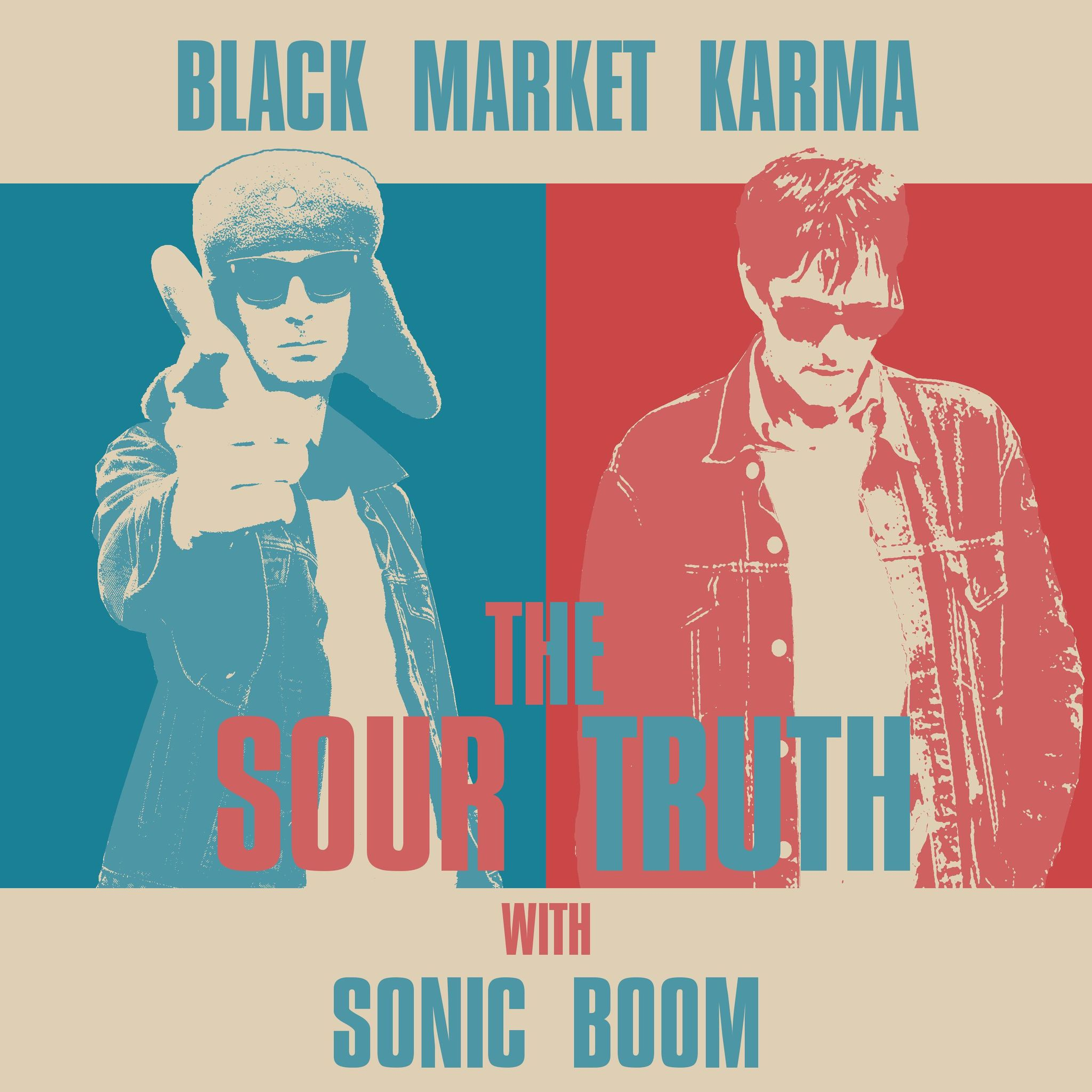
Black Market Karma with Sonic Boom - The Sour Truth Cover Art.

In 2022, Belton collaborated with Sonic Boom AKA Peter Kember (founding member of Spacemen 3) on The Sour Truth.

Produced by Kember and featuring him on synth and percussion, he describes, "I think it’s a song most of us can relate to. Has a whiff of The Only Ones, Daniel Johnston maybe...even a little soupçon of Beat Happening."

Recorded in Dover and Sintra, the single premiered on God Is in the TV.

== Discography ==
=== Studio albums ===
- Comatose (2012)
- Cocoon (2012)
- Easy Listening (2012)
- Semper Fi (2012)
- Upside Out Inside Down (2013)
- The Sixth Time Around (2015)
- Plastic Hippie (2016)
- Animal Jive (2016)
- The Technicolour Liquid Audio Machine (2021)
- Aped Flair & Hijacked Ideas (2022)
- Wobble (2024)
- Mellowmaker (2025)
- The Grease Ladder (2026)

=== Singles ===
- The Maw (2024)

=== Collaborations ===
- Friends In Noise (2023)
- The Sour Truth with Sonic Boom (2023)

=== Compilations ===
- The Reverb Conspiracy Volume 1 (2012)
- Phantasmagoria Volume 1 (2021)

=== Remixes ===
- War in the Streets by Les Big Byrd from their albums They Worshipped Cats (2014) and Remixes, Rarities and Unreleased (2023)
- Leave Nobody Behind by The Telescopes from their album Experimental Health (2023)
