= Weisskalt Records =

Australian record label

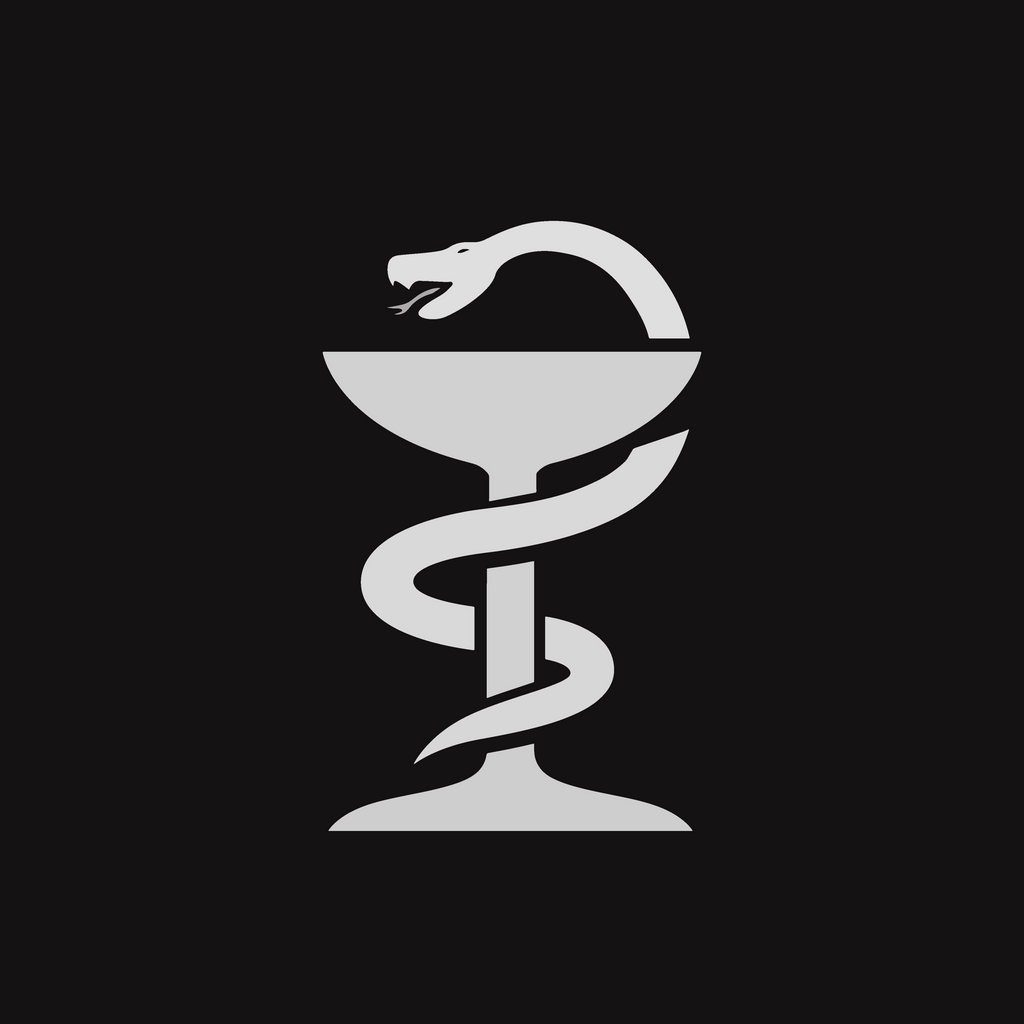
- Founded: 2018
- Genre: Ambient, alternative rock, art rock, ASMR, conceptual, electronic, electronica, electropop, experimental, desert rock, downtempo, drone, field recordings, folk, free form, free improvisation, free jazz, free time, glitch, head, house, jazz, krautrock, lo-fi, meditation, minimal, music therapy, neo psychedelia, noise rock, new-age, performance art, post-rock, progressive rock, psychedelia, psychedelic rock, rock, shoegaze, sitar, sound art, soundtrack, space rock, tribal, trance
- Country of origin: Australia
- Location: Sydney, New South Wales
- Official website: weisskaltrecords.com

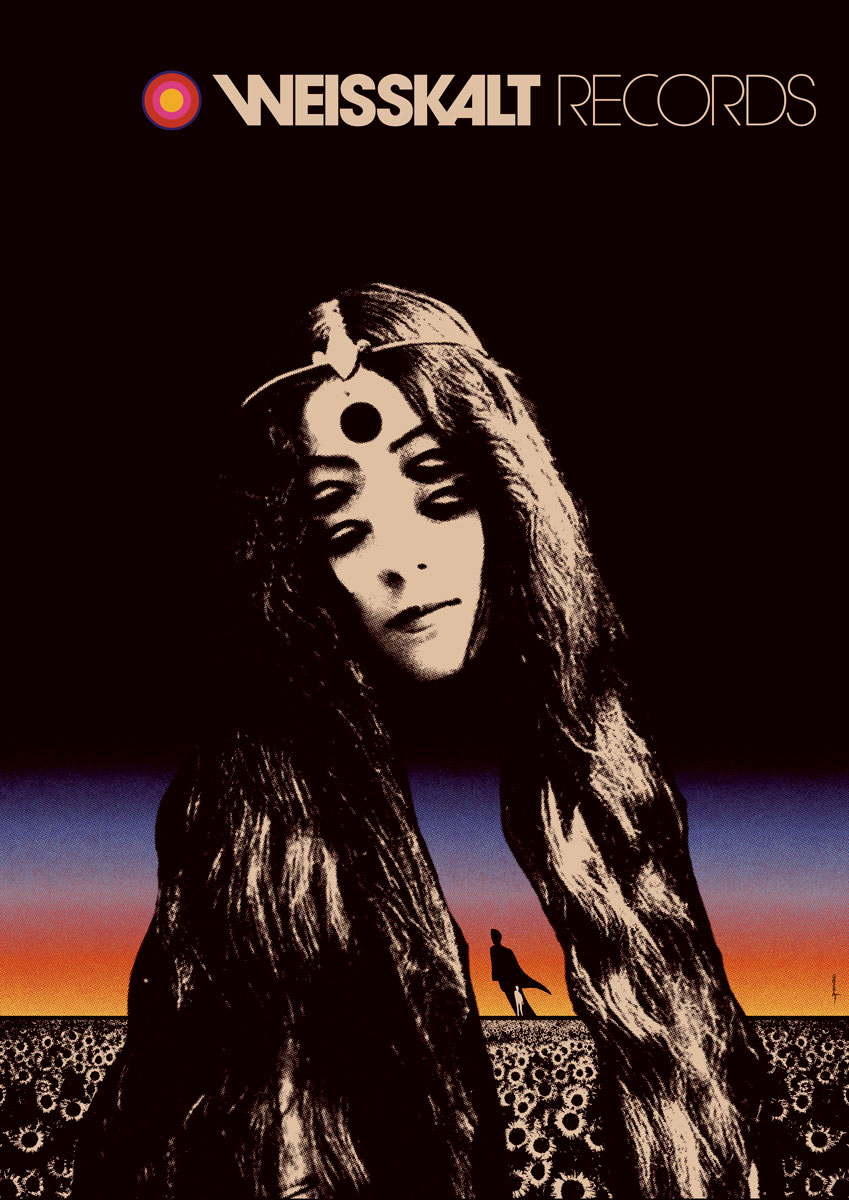
Weisskalt Records Poster, 2018.

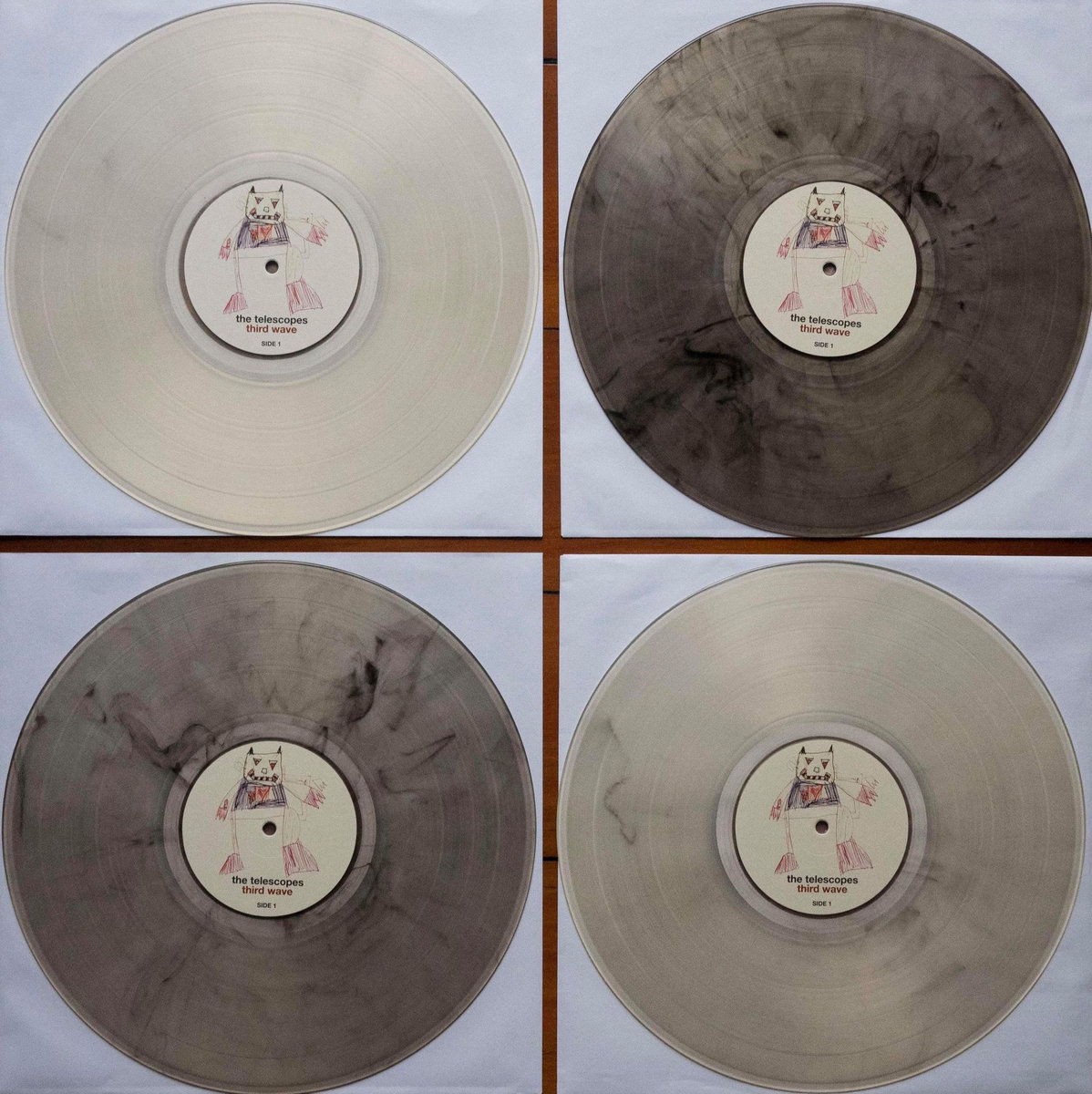
The Telescopes' Third Wave vinyl reissue on Weisskalt. Each record consists of a unique 'ash-infused' colouration and pattern.

Weisskalt Records, also known by the mononym Weisskalt (German Weißkalt, i.e. Whitecold), is an Australian independent record label founded in 2018 and currently based in Sydney, New South Wales. The label has an international profile with the release of recordings from artists with a worldwide audience such as Tropical Sludge in Australia, The Telescopes in the United Kingdom, La Horsa Bianca in Ukraine and Special Cases (ex-Föllakzoid) in Chile.

Some of these releases have featured in critically acclaimed publications such as The Quietus, Under the Radar and Classic Rock for their relevance in rock music history.

Outside of formal releases, musicians including but not limited to Berlin's CAMERA, Ricky Maymi's The Imajinary Friends and King Gizzard and the Lizard Wizard have guest featured on the basis of creative virtuosity in modern psychedelic music.

In addition to proper records, the label has also released sound art, for example field recordings documenting the violent riots on the streets of Santiago during the 2019–2022 Chilean protests, contrasted against music composed by Chilean experimental and psychedelic rock musicians.

Visual artist Robin Gnista from Sweden and Film Director Jean De Oliveira from France have contributed to the aesthetic of the label.

Weisskalt's most recent physical release was The Telescopes' 14th studio album Experimental Health in February 2023 which was included in Beats Per Minute's list of Most Anticipated Releases of 2023. The record was reissued in November 2023 featuring remixes from Black Market Karma and Mosaic Runes.

== Label roster ==
- AP DUCAL
- Ark Hive
- astrocean
- Black Market Karma
- Jeramesa
- La Horsa Bianca
- Mosaic Runes
- Special Cases
- The Telescopes
- Tropical Sludge

== Vinyl releases ==
- WK-003 — Special Cases: Self-Titled (2020) on transparent vinyl, limited to 300 copies.
- WK-004 — La Horsa Bianca: Trumpets of the latter day / The mouse principle (2020) on black vinyl, exclusive edition of 10 copies.
- WK-005 — The Telescopes: Third Wave (2021) on ash-infused transparent vinyl, limited to 300 copies.
- WK-006 —The Telescopes: #4 (2022) on transparent red vinyl, double platter at 45rpm, limited to 300 copies.
- WK-007 — The Telescopes: Experimental Health (2023) on black vinyl, limited to 500 copies.

== Selected reissues ==
- Special Cases: Self-Titled (2020)
- The Telescopes: Third Wave (2021)
- The Telescopes: #4 (2022)

== See also ==
- List of record labels
- Underground music
