= Wobble =

Wobble or wobbles may refer to:

== Arts and entertainment ==
- Wobble bass, in dubstep, an extended bass note that is played rhythmically
- Wobble (album), by Black Market Karma, 2024
- "Wobble" (song), by V.I.C., 2008
- "Wobble", a song by Flo Rida from the 2015 EP My House
- Wobble, a 2018 a poetry collection by Rae Armantrout

== Other uses ==
- Wobbles (equine disorder), or Wobbler disease, a malformation of the cervical vertebrae in dogs and horses
- Wobble in RNA molecules, creating wobble base pairs in Crick's wobble hypothesis
- Jah Wobble (John Joseph Wardle, born 1958), English musician
- Speed wobble, a rapid side-to-side shaking of a vehicle's wheel(s) that occurs at high speeds

== See also ==
- Wobbler (disambiguation)
- Weeble, several lines of children's roly-poly toys
- Doppler spectroscopy in astronomy, also known as the wobble method
- Chandler wobble, a small deviation in the Earth's axis of rotation
- Milankovitch wobble, the collective effects of changes in the Earth's movements on its climate over thousands of years
- Metasyntactic variable, a word identified as a placeholder in computer science
