= Aped Flair and Hijacked Ideas =

Aped Flair & Hijacked Ideas
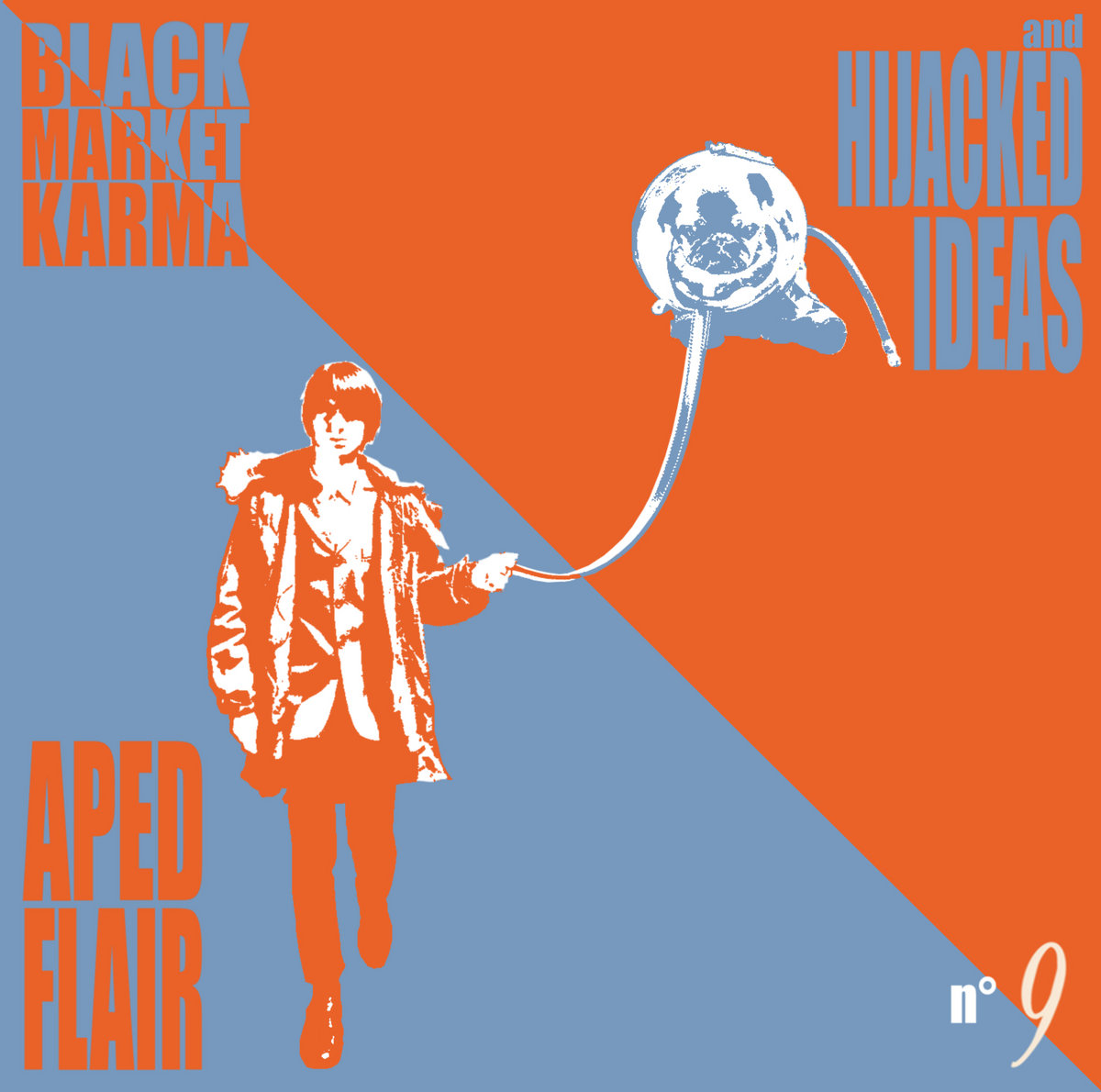

Studio album by Black Market Karma
- Released: 29 September 2022
- Genre: Acid folk; dream pop; lo-fi music; psychedelia; neo-psychedelia; psychedelic pop; psychedelic rock; rock; shoegaze
- Length: 53 minutes
- Label: Flower Power Records

Aped Flair and Hijacked Ideas is the tenth studio album by English rock band Black Market Karma, released on September 29, 2022, by Flower Power Records.

It was written by songwriter and multi-instrumentalist Stanley Belton, notable for its return to a guitar-based sound, featuring vocals on every song after their previous album The Technicolour Liquid Audio Machine being fully instrumental and featuring no guitar.

The release has been aligned with the works of Bob Dylan, The Beatles (White Album), The Brian Jonestown Massacre, Spacemen 3, Small Faces, The Jesus and Mary Chain, and early Pink Floyd.

Four music videos were made to support the album's release.

== Background ==
The album title is a tongue-in-cheek reference to the concept that no music or art is completely original, that all creative expressions are collages drawn from pre-existing material, i.e. "Influence is an infinite web connecting all art."

The closing track Ace's Trip Through the Cosmic Ether is a eulogy to Belton's childhood family dog, also featured on the inside artwork of the vinyl release.

== Critical reception ==
Professional ratings
Review scores
Source	Rating
Clash Magazine	8/10
The Wee Review	4/5
Rock At Night	Favorable

The record has received positive feedback with Clash Magazine's Emma Harrison describing the album as "a bold and ambitious body of work; a cacophony of beguiling melodies, killer hooks and an abundance of playfully distorted wobble".

The Wee Review's Zoë White praises the album's dexterity, "Black Market Karma's cerebral tenth project is an impressive display of Belton's infinitely versatile musicianship and vivid illustrations of the human imagination."

== Track listing ==
All songs written by Stanley Belton except for Kong and A Crying Shame, co-written with Finley Belton.

Aped Flair And Hijacked Ideas track listing
No.	Title	Length
1.	"Dead Trajectory"	3:38
2.	"In My Child Mind (E to A)"	4:22
3.	"Foresight For Hindsight"	4:49
4.	"Kodama"	4:29
5.	"Jumble Jumble"	4:10
6.	"Cadet #2187"	4:26
7.	"The Sunshine Maker"	3:48
8.	"Urchin"	3:20
9.	"Kong"	6:04
10.	"A Crying Shame"	4:29
11.	"Ace's Trip Through the Cosmic Ether"	9:34
