= Friends In Noise =

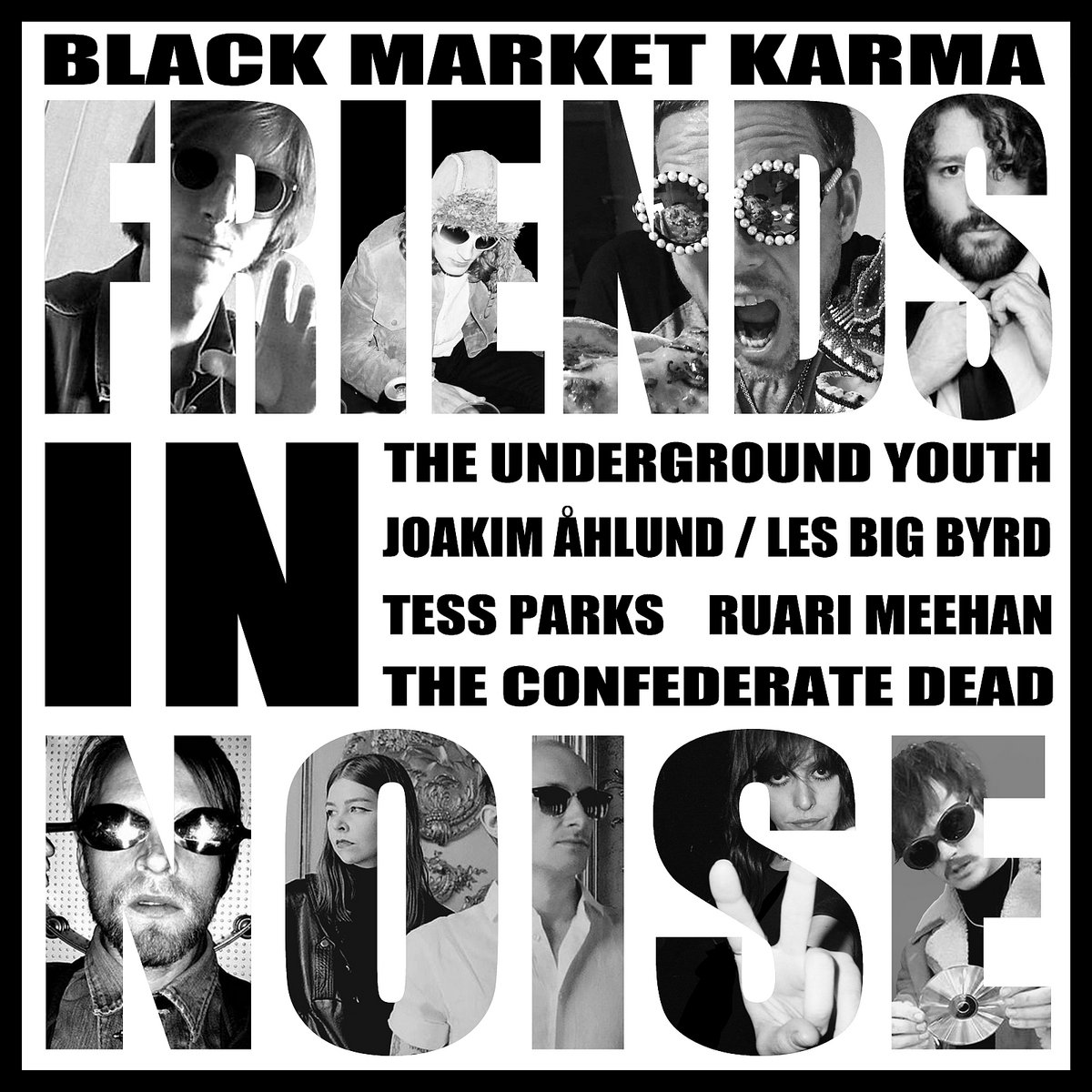

Studio album by Black Market Karma
- Released: 13 January 2023
- Genre: Alternative rock, electronica, psychedelic rock, psychedelic pop, psychedelia, neo-psychedelia
- Length: 31 minutes
- Label: Flower Power Records

Friends In Noise is a collection of collaborative songs between English rock band Black Market Karma and artists Joakim Ahlund (Les Big Byrd), Tess Parks, The Underground Youth, The Confederate Dead and Ruari Meehan.

The tracks are rooted in music connection from touring and was recorded sporadically over a period of 9 years.

It was released on 13 January 2023 by Flower Power Records and pressed on 500 copies of black vinyl. The announcement coincided with Black Market Karma being publicly confirmed as openers for The Black Angels on their 2023 European tour.

The release was supported by the premiering of two singles The Sky Was All Diseased on 2 of November 2022 and Aping Flair on 6 December 2022.

Four music videos accompanied the record featuring footage of all six artists.

== Critical reception ==
The album has received a warm reception from listeners and publishers alike with individual tracks repeatedly praised.

Backseat Mafia's Arun Kendall describes Wonky as "a glorious scuzzy shoegaze blast that fuses a Jesus and Mary Chain insolence with a Velvet Underground drone, all wrapped up in a sixties sparkle. It swaggers, it prowls, it scowls with a black leather-jacketed sneer and yet scales immeasurable pop heights with a fuzzy bravado. Released through Flower Power Records, the track comes off Black Market Karma's recent eleventh album, 'Friends in Noise' and is an absolute cathartic rocket-fueled blast of goodness."

The Sky Was All Diseased was featured as Stereo Embers' Track Of The Day with Alex Green describing, "While the song aches beautifully away, a shiny guitar line appears like the sun poking through the clouds only to be swallowed in seconds again by the darkness. It's hard to imagine a number that can be this deceptively catchy."

The Big Takeover's Dave Franklin observes, "although Belton finds himself co-writing and collaborating with artists from across the musical spectrum, there is absolute consistency to the results, the album seemingly having one foot in a version of the sixties that didn't quite exist and the other striding forward into a new horizon yet to be fully realized. More than that, it all sounds, to a greater degree, like a Black Market Karma record, which must speak volumes about Stanley Belton's exercise and control."

== Track listing ==
Friends In Noise track listing
No.	Title	Length
1.	"Aping Flair" (with Ruari Meehan)	5:30
2.	"Wonky" (with The Underground Youth)	4:12
3.	"The Sky Was All Diseased" (with Tess Parks)	6:11
4.	"Heady Ideas" (Joakim Åhlund Remix)	3:56
5.	"War In The Streets" (Stanley Belton Remix)	4:33
6.	"Ageing Boy" (with The Confederate Dead)	7:04

== Credits ==
1. Aping Flair – Black Market Karma & Ruari Meehan. Written by Stanley Belton & Ruari Meehan. Instruments: Drums, Guitar, Vocals, Keys, Percussion by Stanley Belton. Guitar, Bass, Backing Vocals by Ruari Meehan. Recorded & Mixed in London by Stanley Belton.

2. Wonky – Black Market Karma & The Underground Youth. Written by Stanley Belton & Craig Dyer. Instruments: Drums, Guitar, Bass, Vocals, Keys by Stanley Belton. Guitar, Vocals by Craig Dyer. Recorded by Stanley Belton & Craig Dyer in London & Berlin. Mixed by Stanley Belton.

3. The Sky Was All Diseased – Black Market Karma & Tess Parks. Written by Stanley Belton & Tess Parks. Instruments: Drums, Bass, Guitar, Keys, Percussion, Vocals. Vocals by Tess Parks. Recorded & Mixed in London by Stanley Belton.

4. Heady Ideas – Joakim Ahlund Remix. Written by Stanley Belton. Remixed by Joakim Ahlund who added synthesisers, drums & percussion. Recorded in London & Stockholm.

5. War In The Streets – Stan Belton Remix. Written by Joakim Ahlund & Frans Johansson (Les Big Byrd). Remixed by Stanley Belton. Recorded in Stockholm & London. Extra drums, guitar, keyboards and percussion were recorded for this version by Stanley Belton at his studio.

6. Ageing Boy – Black Market Karma & The Confederate Dead. Written by Butchy Davy & Stanley Belton.

All songs mastered by Stanley Belton.
