= Wobbler =

Wobbler may refer to:

- Wobbler (fishing), a type of fishing lure
- Wobbler or Wiggler (tool), a centering tool in metalworking
- Wobbler (band), a Norwegian progressive rock band
- Wobbler disease, a neurological condition of dogs and horses
- A crime that could be charged as either a felony or misdemeanor, also called a hybrid offence
- A toy that shakes back and forth, such as a bobblehead doll or roly-poly toy

== See also ==
- Wobble (disambiguation)
