= Songs of Love and Revolution =

Studio album by The Telescopes
- Released: 5 February 2021
- Genre: Shoegaze; dream pop; noise rock
- Length: 39:10
- Label: Tapete

The Telescopes chronology
Exploding Head Syndrome (2019)	Songs of Love and Revolution (2021)

Professional ratings
Aggregate scores
Source	Rating
Metacritic	80/100
Review scores
Source	Rating
AllMusic	4/5 stars
Beats Per Minute	80%
Classic Rock	4/5 stars
Under the Radar	8/10

Songs of Love and Revolution is the twelfth studio album by English noise rock band The Telescopes. It was released on February 5, 2021, by Tapete Records.

== Critical reception ==
Songs of Love and Revolution was met with "generally favorable" reviews from critics. At Metacritic, which assigns a weighted average rating out of 100 to reviews from mainstream publications, this release received an average score of 80 based on 5 reviews.

Writing for AllMusic, Fred Thomas explained: "Twelfth studio album Songs of Love & Revolution continues the group's fixation with noise-dazzled psychedelic drone rock, but the production is clearer and the songs hit with direct impact. These nine songs are some of the most neatly rendered of the band's post-2010 output, but lose none of their mind-bending effect in the production upgrade. If anything, the album finds the Telescopes delivering their messages of self-discovery and cosmic love louder than ever." Tim Sentz of Beats Per Minute said: "Songs of Love and Revolution, the band’s 12th album, comes after a decade of reinvention and experimentation. All the arrangements on their latest take influence from their 2010s material, but this time around every element coexists with one another, creating a sublime noise bath. Songs of Love and Revolution finds a home, a warm center, that crossroads between shoegaze, noise rock, ambient fuzz, and believe it or not – pop. In fact, this could be Lawrie’s most accessible album to date, and that’s taking into account Hidden Fields closeted pop." In a review for Classic Rock, True Everett gave the release a four out of five stars, describing the album as "hypnotic, breathtaking and quite, quite beautiful."

== Track listing ==
Songs of Love and Revolution track listing
No.	Title	Length
1.	"This Is Not a Dream"	5:23
2.	"Strange Waves"	3:27
3.	"Mesmerised"	5:59
4.	"Come Bring Your Love"	5:11
5.	"This Train"	4:02
6.	"Songs of Love and Revolution"	4:12
7.	"You're Never Alone with Despair"	4:36
8.	"We See Magic and We Are Neutral, Unnecessary"	4:21
9.	"Haul Away the Anchor"	2:00
Total length:		39:10

== Charts ==
Chart performance for Songs of Love and Revolution
Chart (2021)	Peak position
UK Independent Albums (OCC)	35
