= Third Wave (album) =

2021 studio album by the Telescopes

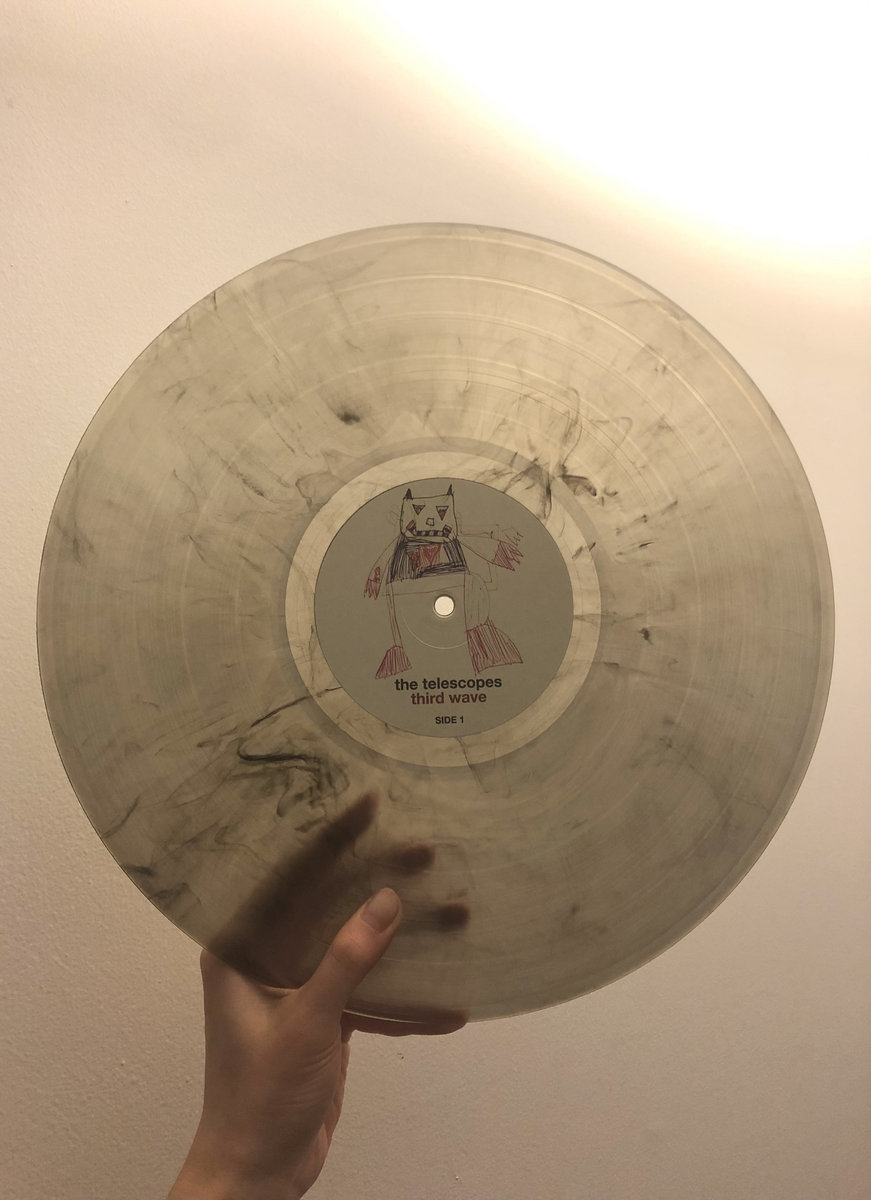

Studio album by The Telescopes
- Released: 5 March 2021
- Genre: alternative rock; downtempo; drone; electronica; experimental; free form; free improvisation; head; jazz; noise rock; psychedelia; shoegaze; space rock
- Length: 48 minutes
- Label: Weisskalt Records and Double Agent Records

Professional ratings
Review scores
Source	Rating
Pitchfork	8.3/10
AllMusic	6/10
Discogs	4.15/5
Norman Records	9/10
Amazon Music	4.2/5
Album of the Year	79/100

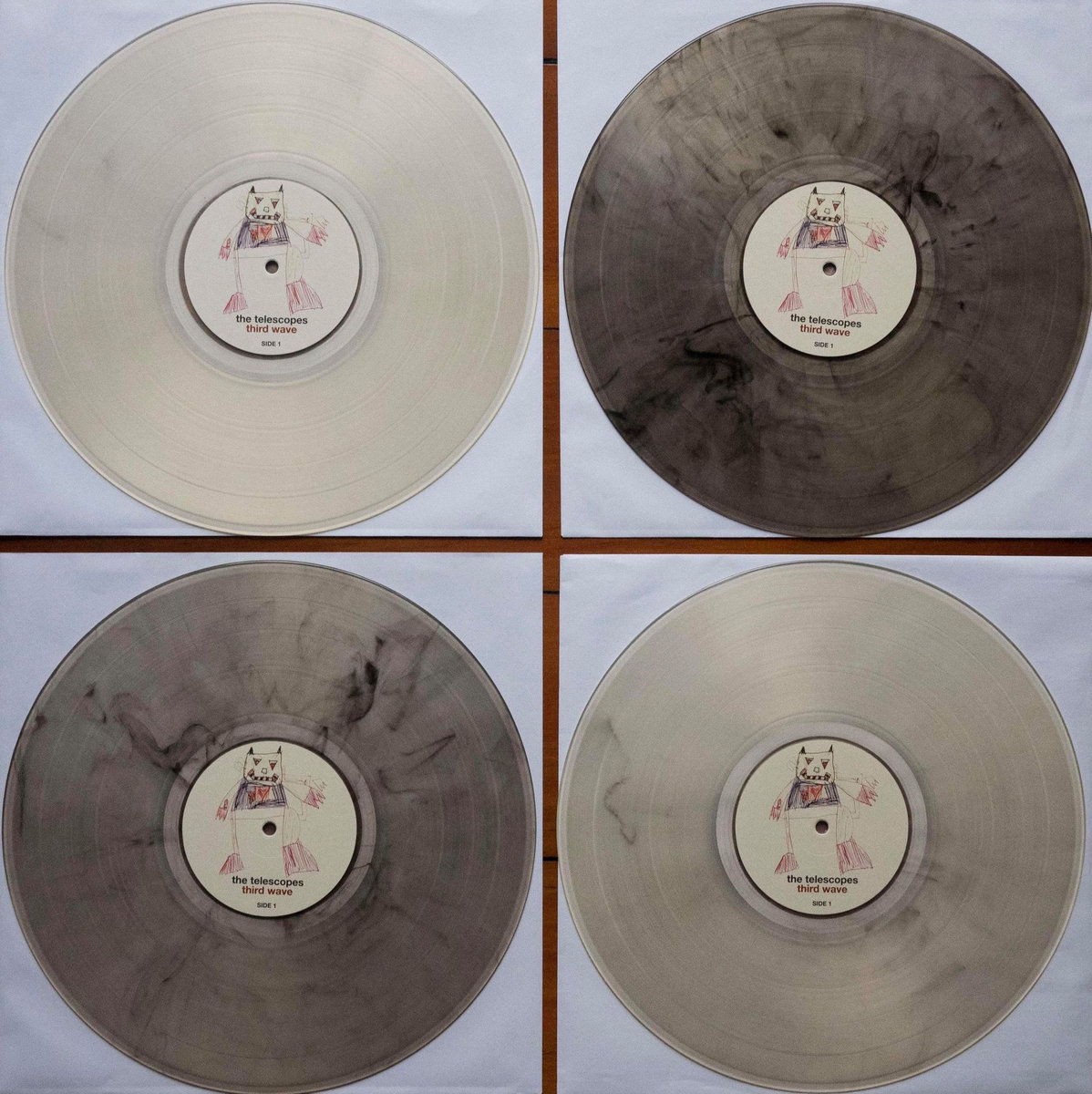
The Telescopes' Third Wave vinyl reissue on Weisskalt Records. Each record consists of a unique 'ash-infused' colouration and pattern.

Third Wave is the third studio album by English noise rock band The Telescopes.

It was released on vinyl and CD by Double Agent Records in 2002, later reissued on vinyl by Weisskalt Records in 2021 as a limited edition of 300.

== Background ==
The album title makes reference to the way the tracks were constructed, as Stephen Lawrie explains in an interview with American music journalist Todd E. Jones, "We'd allow each other to freely improvise the structures, recording everything to wave files and cutting away at each texture to let in different shades". Metaphysically, the music was an "electronic ocean where waves of sound and rhythm rolled over the listener."

The record is notable as it heralded a surprise return by the band after a 10-year hiatus and possessed a more experimental approach to music whilst cementing Lawrie's reputation for having a fluid and revolutionary approach to songwriting and performance. For Lawrie, the album was in part a reclamation of proper artistic freedom and identity, rejecting formulaic and repetitive processes in composing records.

The majority of the musicians who played on the album adhered to a freedom principle where each musician improvised along to a track several times with everything recorded and key moments chosen. In some instances the parts were written. It was observed that the only musicians who struggled with the process were the trained session musicians who relied on a score to work with whereas the more self-taught musicians possessed a higher degree of intuition and were more at ease with working instinctively. This was slightly problematic as Lawrie did not read music therefore a workable compromise had to be developed which differed with each player.

Unlike the first two Telescopes albums which were mainly written on guitar, Third Wave was predominantly written on piano and organ. In addition, some of the gear used aside from vocals include but are not limited to the farfisa, sitar, Casio, 303, cello, violin, software, tabla, flugelhorn, theremin, a prayer box, tape delays, double bass, vibraphone, clarinet.

The album has been lauded as a testament to Lawrie's innovative experimentation of computer technology which were contemporary at the time, outside of the restrictions of a formal music studio.

== Critical reception ==
Third Wave has received continual critical acclaim and subtle reverence from music journalists, with Pitchfork's Joe Tangari assigning it a rating of 8.3, describing it as "unique, laid-back, beautiful and chaotic by equal measures, and for music that was so obviously a serious labor to put together, it all sounds amazingly fluid and natural."

The release was also championed by BBC Radio1's the late John Peel, for whom they recorded two sessions, supporting their return and Third Wave, exclaiming “The Telescopes have resurfaced and I am amazed and glad they are still practicing their mysterious art.”

For their 2021 Weisskalt vinyl, the album was lauded as one of the best reissues of the year with Norman Records observing its anniversary and relevance in rock music history, "Next year will see The Telescopes' 'Third Wave' celebrate its twentieth birthday. The album still ranks among the cult psych-rock band's best and boldest work - this is a richly experimental affair that channels the very best of 1970s kosmische in spirit as much as sound, daringly shifting between cerebral valium-psych songs, musique concrete and erstwhile post-industrial experimentalism. 'Third Wave' comes off like a midpoint between Can and late-period Einstürzende Neubauten, and it's more than deserving of this Weisskalt reissue."

== Track listing ==
All lyrics and music written by Stephen Lawrie. Produced & engineered by Stephen Lawrie & Angus Wallace. Recorded at Far Heath Studios, The Space Station and Wired Studios. Mixed at Far Heath by Angus Wallace. Drawings by George Lawrie.

Third Wave track listing
No.	Title	Length
1.	"a cabin in the sky"	4:44
2.	"3D jesus ashtray"	5:08
3.	"tesla death ray"	5:57
4.	"my name is zardak [drop your weaponz]"	1:18
5.	"a good place to hide"	6:43
6.	"when nemo sank the nautillus"	4:37
7.	"winter#2"	3:57
8.	"moog destroya"	4:53
9.	"the atoms of the sea"	5:25
10.	"you and i are the foxboy noises"	5:08
