= The Sour Truth =

2023 song by Black Market Karma feat. Sonic Boom

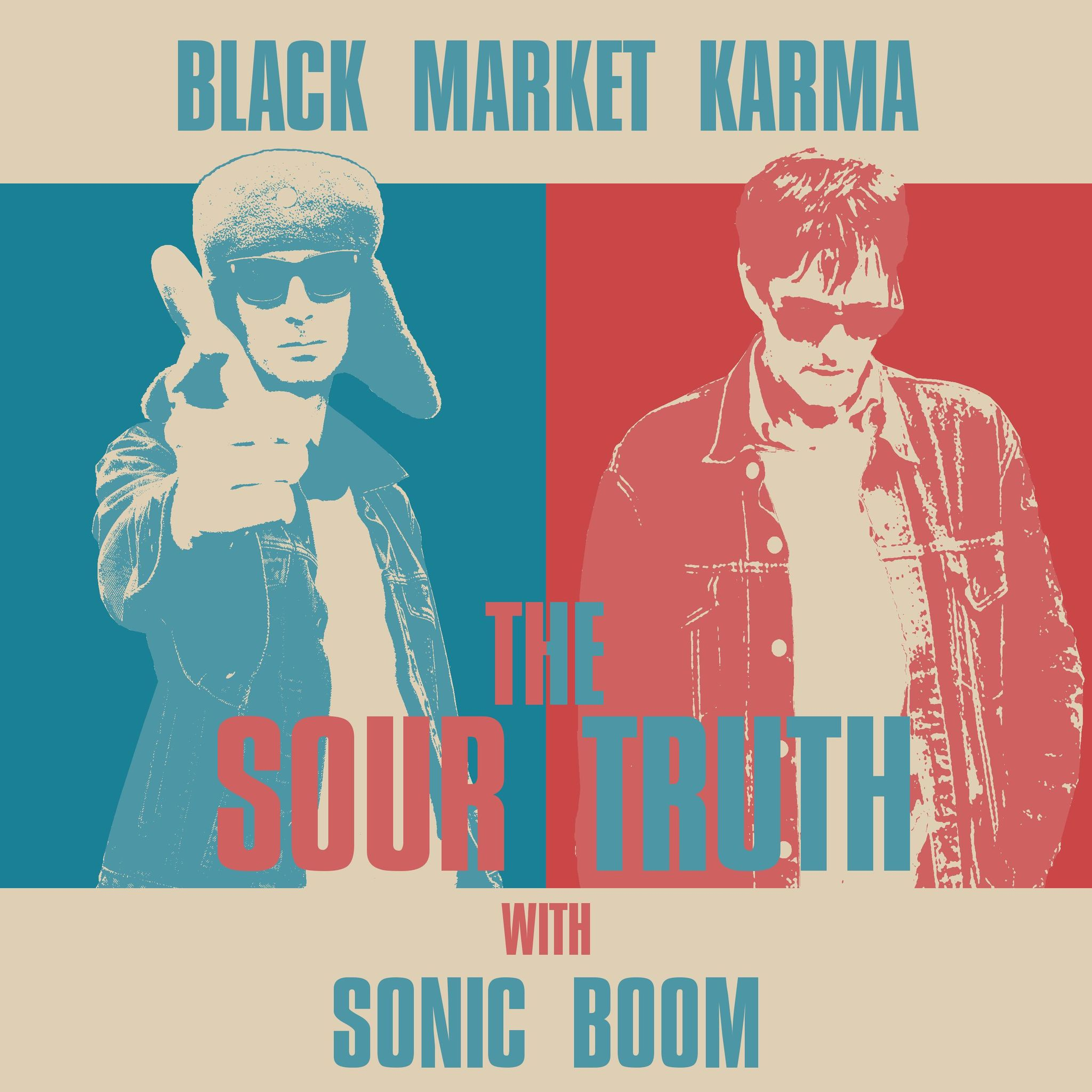

Single by Black Market Karma with Sonic Boom
- Released: 16 August 2023
- Genre: Electronica; psychedelia; psychedelic pop
- Length: 9 minutes
- Label: Flower Power Records

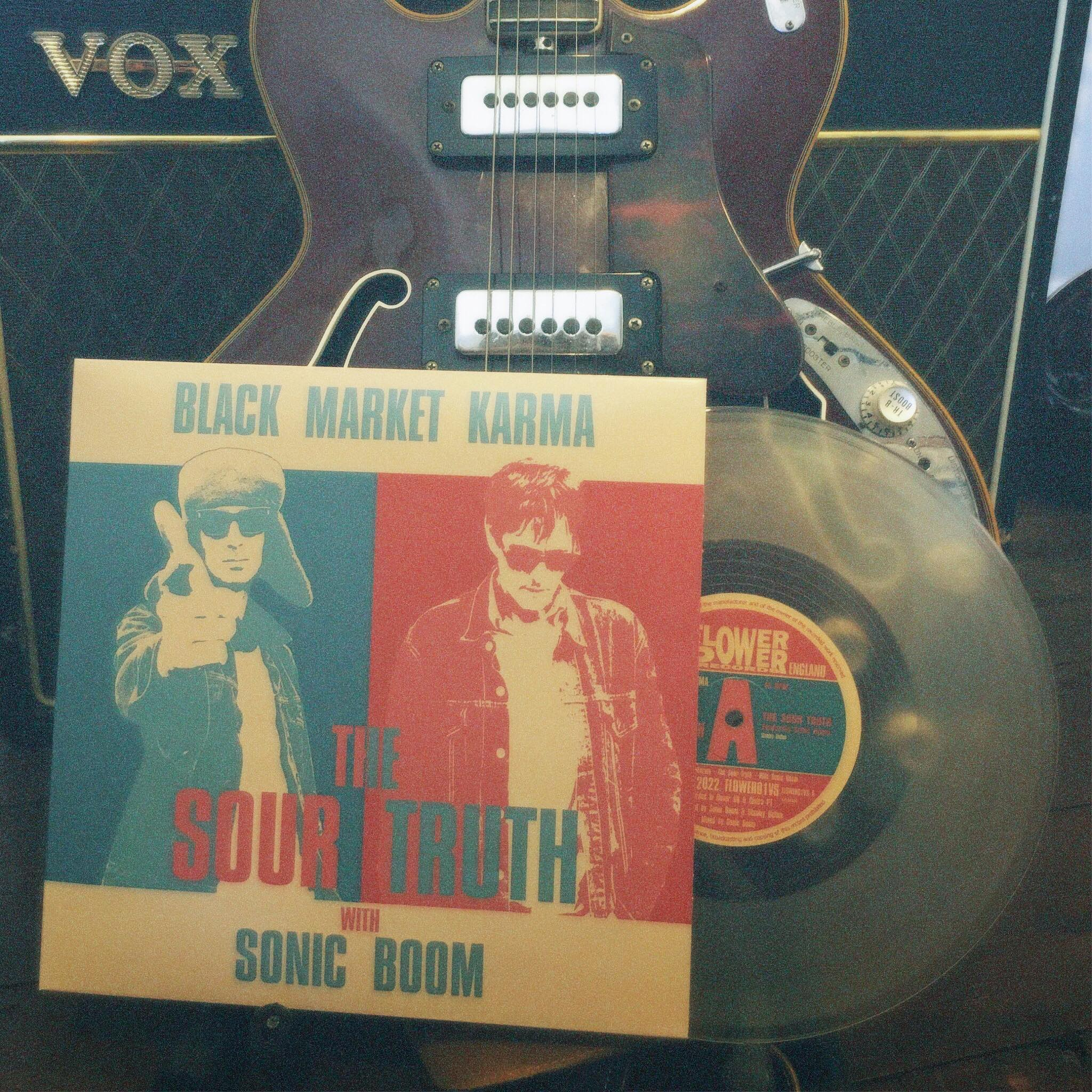
Black Market Karma with Sonic Boom - The Sour Truth vinyl release

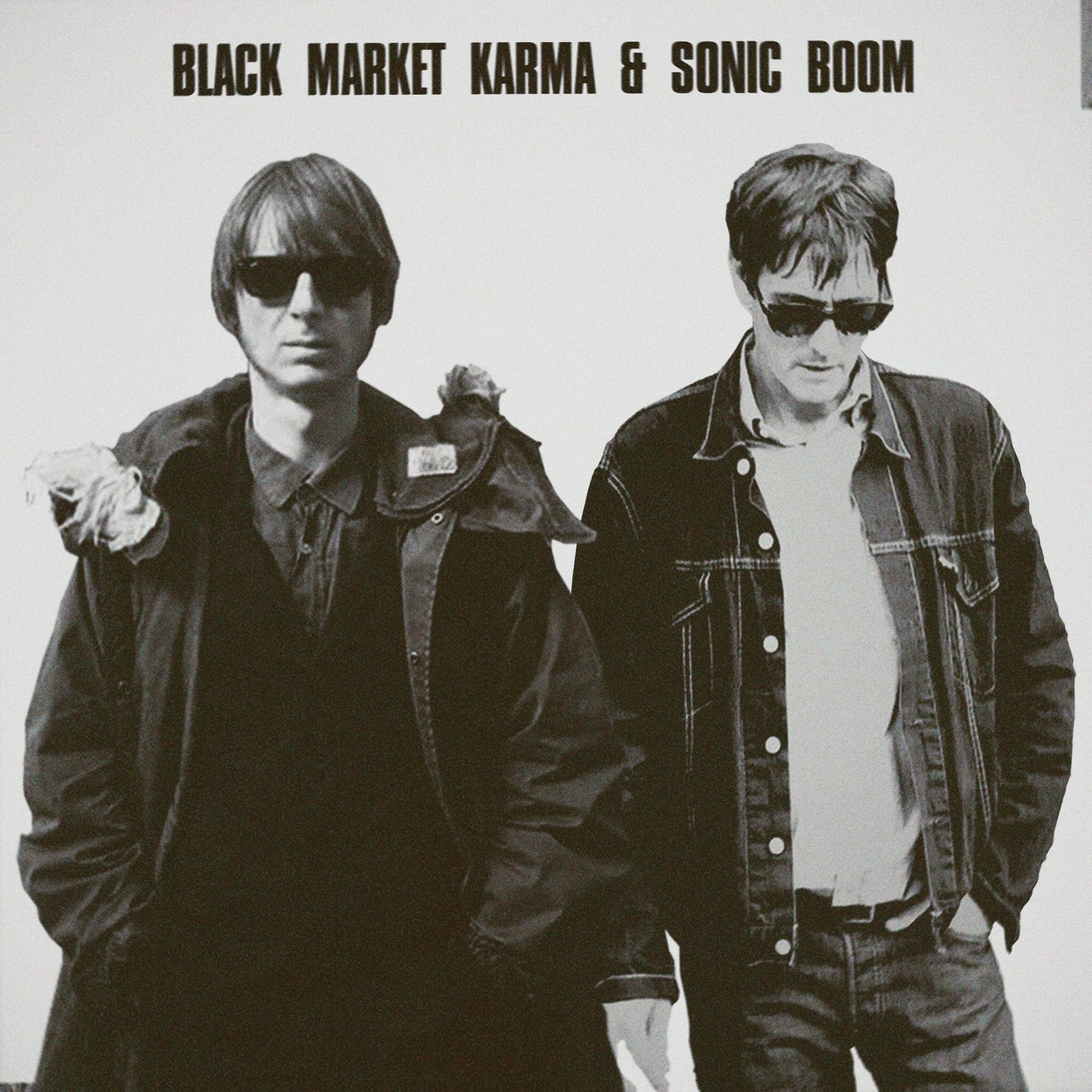
Black Market Karma & Sonic Boom - The Sour Truth poster

The Sour Truth is a collaboration between English musicians Stanley Belton as Black Market Karma and Peter Kember as Sonic Boom. It was released on 16 August 2023 by Flower Power Records, premiering through the online magazine God Is in the TV. It is available as a 10-inch transparent vinyl record, limited to 500 copies.

The release was supported by a minimalist absence-of-presence music video layered with different film styles and analogue textures. The video makes reference to the location Dover and the legacy of Sonic Boom in Spacemen 3.

== Background ==
The collaboration came about when Peter Kember found the track on Stanley Belton's Black Market Karma social media profile.

The music contains cycling Lo-fi guitars, stacked tremolos, shimmering vocals and sugary winding synths, laced with lyrics expressing the pain of cognitive dissonance after loving a version of someone that turned out to be a facade. It has been likened towards artists such as Spacemen 3, Panda Bear, Jesus & Mary Chain, Brian Jonestown Massacre, Spiritualized and MGMT.

The track was recorded during 2021 in their respective residences, Belton in Dover (England) and Kember in Sintra (Portugal).

== Track listing ==
The Sour Truth track listing
No.	Title	Length
1.	"The Sour Truth"	4:07
2.	"Wisdom Shifter"	5:14

== Credits ==
- Written by Stanley Belton
- Stanley Belton – guitar, vocals, keys, synths, drums, bass
- Peter Kember – synths, percussion on "The Sour Truth"
- Mastered by Stanley Belton

The Sour Truth

- Recorded in Dover & Sintra by Stanley Belton and Peter Kember
- Produced by Peter Kember and Stanley Belton
- Mixed by Peter Kember

Wisdom Shifter

- Recorded, mixed and produced by Stanley Belton
