= Taste (The Telescopes album) =

Studio album by the Telescopes
- Released: 1989
- Recorded: June 1989
- Genre: Shoegaze
- Label: What Goes On
- Producer: Richard Formby

The Telescopes chronology
Taste (1989)	The Telescopes (1992)

Professional ratings
Review scores
Source	Rating
AllMusic	2.5/5 stars
NME	7/10

Taste is the debut studio album by English alternative rock band the Telescopes, released in 1989 on What Goes On Records. The album was produced by Richard Formby and engineered by Ken MacPherson and Chris Bell. After What Goes On folded, it was re-released in 1990 by Cheree, and it was later released in 2006 by Rev-Ola Records to include live versions of "There Is No Floor", "Sadness Pale", "Threadbare" and "Suicide".

In 2016, Pitchfork ranked Taste at number 47 on its list of the 50 best shoegaze albums of all time.

== Track listing ==
All tracks are written by Stephen Lawrie

No.	Title	Length
1.	"And Let Me Drift Away"	2:18
2.	"I Fall, She Screams"	2:40
3.	"Oil Seed Rape"	2:58
4.	"Violence"	3:34
5.	"Threadbare"	1:37
6.	"The Perfect Needle"	3:28
7.	"There Is No Floor"	3:15
8.	"Anticipating Nowhere"	1:47
9.	"Please, Before You Go"	3:27
10.	"Suffercation"	2:40
11.	"Silent Water"	3:27
12.	"Suicide"	7:56
