= One Unique Signal =

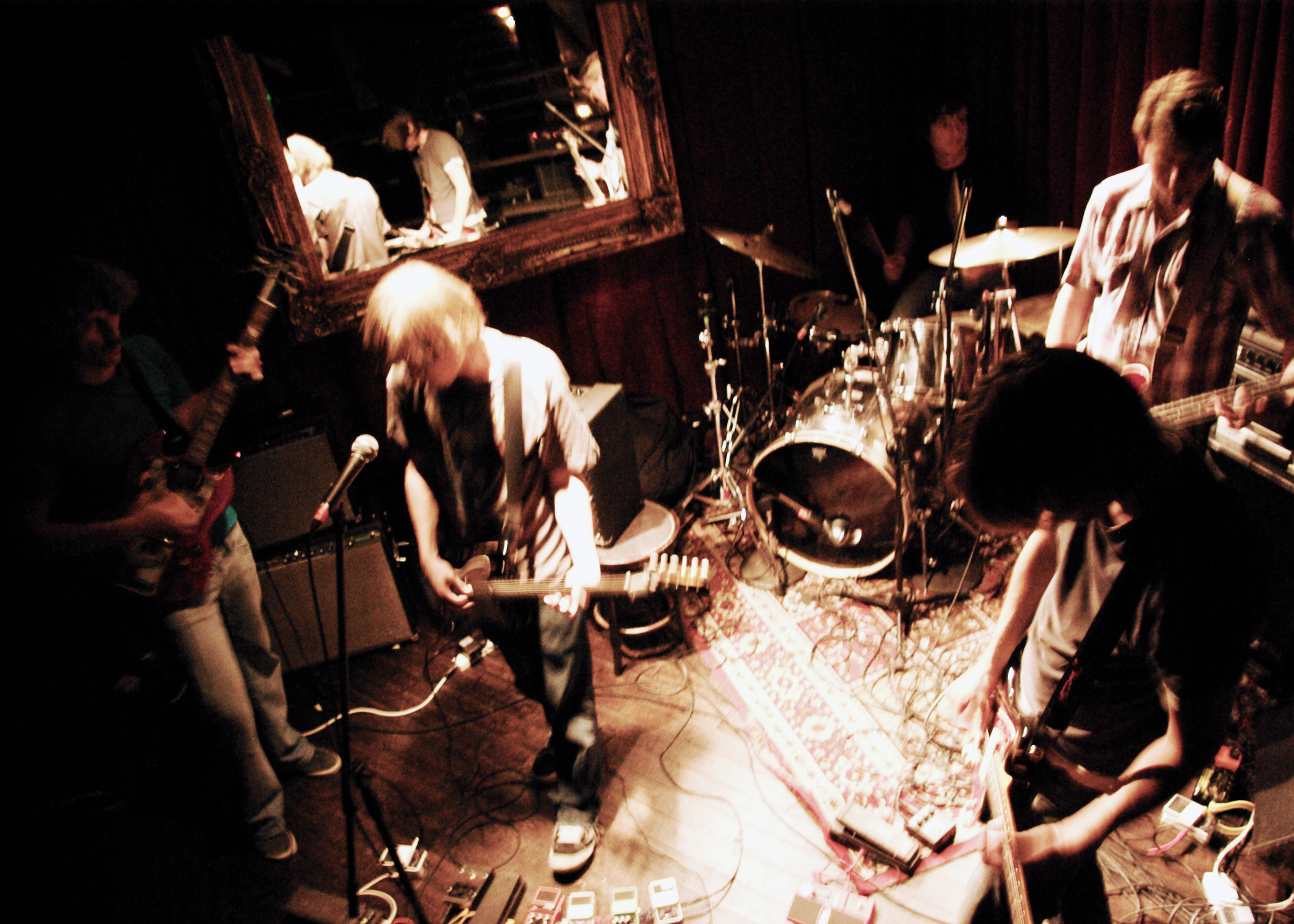
- At London Underbelly 2009

Background information
- Origin: Brentford, Middlesex, England
- Genres: Space rock, experimental, psychedelic rock, noise rock
- Years active: 2002-present
- Labels: Genepool Records, Universal, Fuzz Club Records, sister9
- Members: Byron Jackson; Nick Keech; Daniel Davis; Katie Graham
- Past members: Jim Beal; James Messenger; Edward Harding; Lee Barber
- Website: http://www.oneuniquesignal.com/

Formed in 2002, One Unique Signal are a British, London based, five piece playing loud repetitive experimental music. The band also perform live and record as The Telescopes alongside founder Stephen Lawrie since 2010.

Of the official releases, there is "Lowry" (single 2003) featured in TV series Dirty Sanchez, "Tribe, Castle and Nation" (album 2005) "Villains To A Man" EP 2009 was Julian Cope's album of the month on Head Heritage and "Hey Alchemist/Neuralgia" (single 2011). They have performed a live session on London radio station Resonance FM.

The band released its third album Aether in 2013, which was mastered by Peter Kember from Spacemen 3 and Spectrum.

In 2016, "Hoopsnake", the band's 4th album was released via Fuzz Club Records. It was a collaborative project of twenty artists including Ian Jackson (Half Man Half Biscuit), and Mark Refoy (Spacemen 3) (Spiritualized) (Slipstream (band)).

== Discography ==
=== Albums ===
- Tribe, Castle and Nation (2005)
- Villains To A Man EP (2009)
- Aether (2013)
- Hoopsnake (2016)
- The Drift (2018)

=== Singles ===
- "Lowry" (2003)
- "Dismemberment" (2008)
- "Gora (2010)
- "Hey Alchemist/Neuralgia" (2011)
