= The Telescopes (album) =

1992 album by The Telescopes

Studio album by The Telescopes
- Released: May 1992
- Recorded: 1992
- Genre: Psychedelic rock, dream pop
- Length: 39:43
- Label: Creation
- Producer: Guy Fixsen

The Telescopes chronology
Taste (1989)	The Telescopes (1992)	Third Wave (2002)

Professional ratings
Review scores
Source	Rating
AllMusic	4.5/5 stars

The Telescopes is the second studio album by English alternative rock band The Telescopes, released in 1992 on Creation Records. It has been referred to by the title High'r 'n' High'r (or fully Higher and Higher), due to said text appearing on the original album cover. The album was reissued in 2004 by Rev-Ola Records with the title # Untitled Second and featuring the bonus tracks "dnaanb" and "Tornado".

== Track listing ==
All tracks are written by Stephen Lawrie

No.	Title	Length
1.	"Splashdown"	3:11
2.	"High on Fire"	3:12
3.	"You Set My Soul"	3:43
4.	"Spaceships"	3:56
5.	"The Presence of Your Grace"	3:25
6.	"And"	4:32
7.	"Flying"	2:51
8.	"Yeah"	3:40
9.	"Ocean Drive"	4:40
10.	"Please Tell Mother"	3:46
11.	"To the Shore"	2:47
