= The Technicolour Liquid Audio Machine =

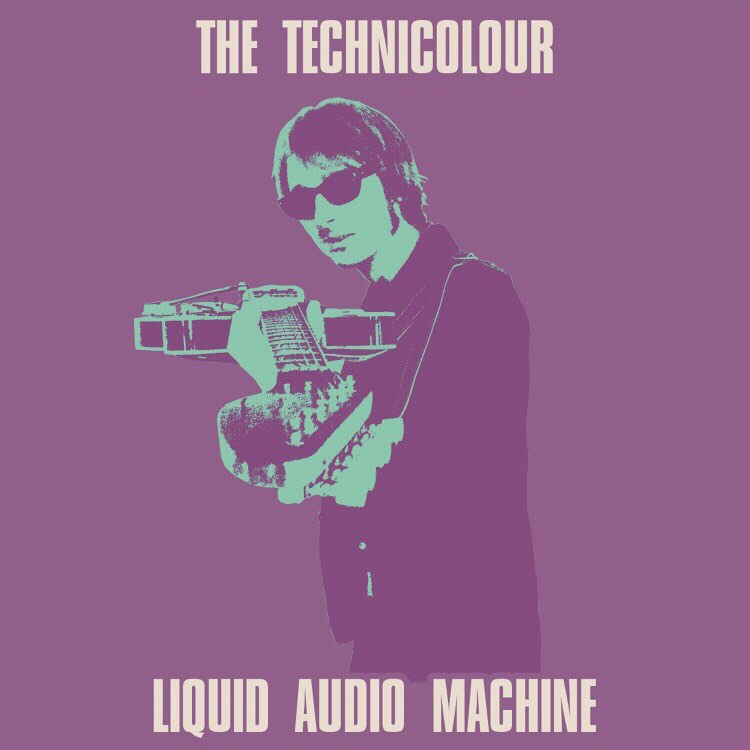

Studio album by Black Market Karma
- Released: 3 September 2021
- Genre: Alternative rock; blues; electronica; experimental; hip hop; instrumental; psychedelia
- Length: 45 minutes
- Label: Flower Power Records

The Technicolour Liquid Audio Machine is the ninth studio album by English rock band Black Market Karma. It was released on September 3, 2021, by Flower Power Records.

It was written by songwriter and multi-instrumentalist Stanley Belton during the 2020 COVID-19 lockdown with minimal resources available.

The release is supported by hazy and dreamy music videos for each track, expressive of a retro and nostalgic aesthetic.

== Background ==
The album is a departure from the band's previous recordings in that it is fully instrumental with the exception of vocal samples predominantly from Belton's Grandfather William 'Bill' Proud whom the record was made in tribute to.

In an interview with It's Psychedelic, Baby Magazine's Klemen Breznikar, Belton explains the reasoning behind these creative decisions, "My grandad died at the beginning of 2020 and I desperately wanted to make a tribute to him. At the time I was moving home in the middle of the lockdown meaning that most of my gear was in storage. All I had to hand was a keyboard and some old drum recordings from previous sessions. I wanted to make something for him so badly that it pushed me to work with the bare minimum. I had to work in a different way, almost like a hip hop producer or something. It really inspired me and I was so amped with how it turned out that I decided to push forward with a whole record using that style. It’s fully instrumental apart from a few vocal samples (including one of my Grandad) and has basically no guitar on it.

There were originally no vocals because I didn’t have the equipment to do them but after a while I realised that it was working great that way. Something free from language and that as a listener, you have to meet half way and let yourself get lost in. A definite departure for me and probably the most atmospheric Black Market Karma record."

== Critical reception ==
The record has received positive feedback with Clash Magazine's Emma Harrison praising it as "an intriguing and evocative release that effortlessly demonstrates Stan Belton’s spectacular composing skills" and POW Magazine's Dennis Gonzales commending the aesthetic development, "the change of pace on The Tecnicolour Liquid Audio Machine is noticeable but still follows the bands aesthetic and is derived from similar inspirational elements."

== Track listing ==
All tracks are written by Stanley Belton.

The Technicolour Liquid Audio Machine track listing
No.	Title	Length
1.	"Bluebell (intro)"	1:16
2.	"Lo Slung"	2:22
3.	"Delta Hand"	4:02
4.	"Deep Colossus"	4:36
5.	"Hedgehog"	1:41
6.	"Reckoning On A Change"	3:31
7.	"Keep On Keeping Your Light On"	5:16
8.	"Pier 57"	3:21
9.	"Crystalline Sky Box"	3:57
10.	"No Fear, No Envy, No Meaness"	4:32
11.	"Dawn"	1:29
12.	"Living In Yesterday"	3:46
13.	"William"	4:38
