= The Telescopes =

English space rock band

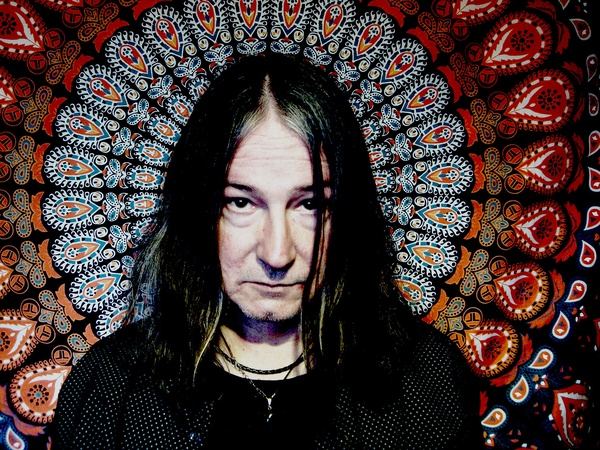
- Stephen Lawrie (The Telescopes) Press Shot for the full length album Of Tomorrow on Tapete, 2023.

Background information
- Origin: Burton upon Trent, England
- Genres: Alternative; noise rock; psychedelic rock; shoegaze; space rock; ambient; avant-garde; dream pop; downtempo; drone; electropop; electronica; ethereal; experimental; folk; free jazz; improvisation; neo-psychedelia; jazz; indie; nu-gaze; soundtrack
- Years active: 1987–present
- Labels: Antenna; Bomp!; Champion Version; Cheree; Cherry Red; Creation; Double Agent; Dream Machine; Improved Sequence; Fierce; Fuzz Club; Glass Modern; Hungry Audio; Mind Expansion; MPLS Ltd; Neon Sigh; Rev-Ola; Rocket Girl; Rhyo; Space Age; Static Charge; Textile; Union Editions; Tapete; Trensmat; Weisskalt; What Goes On; Yard Press
- Members: Stephen Lawrie; JB Zurbach; John Lynch; Robert Prest; Tara Clamart
- Website: thetelescopes.bandcamp.com

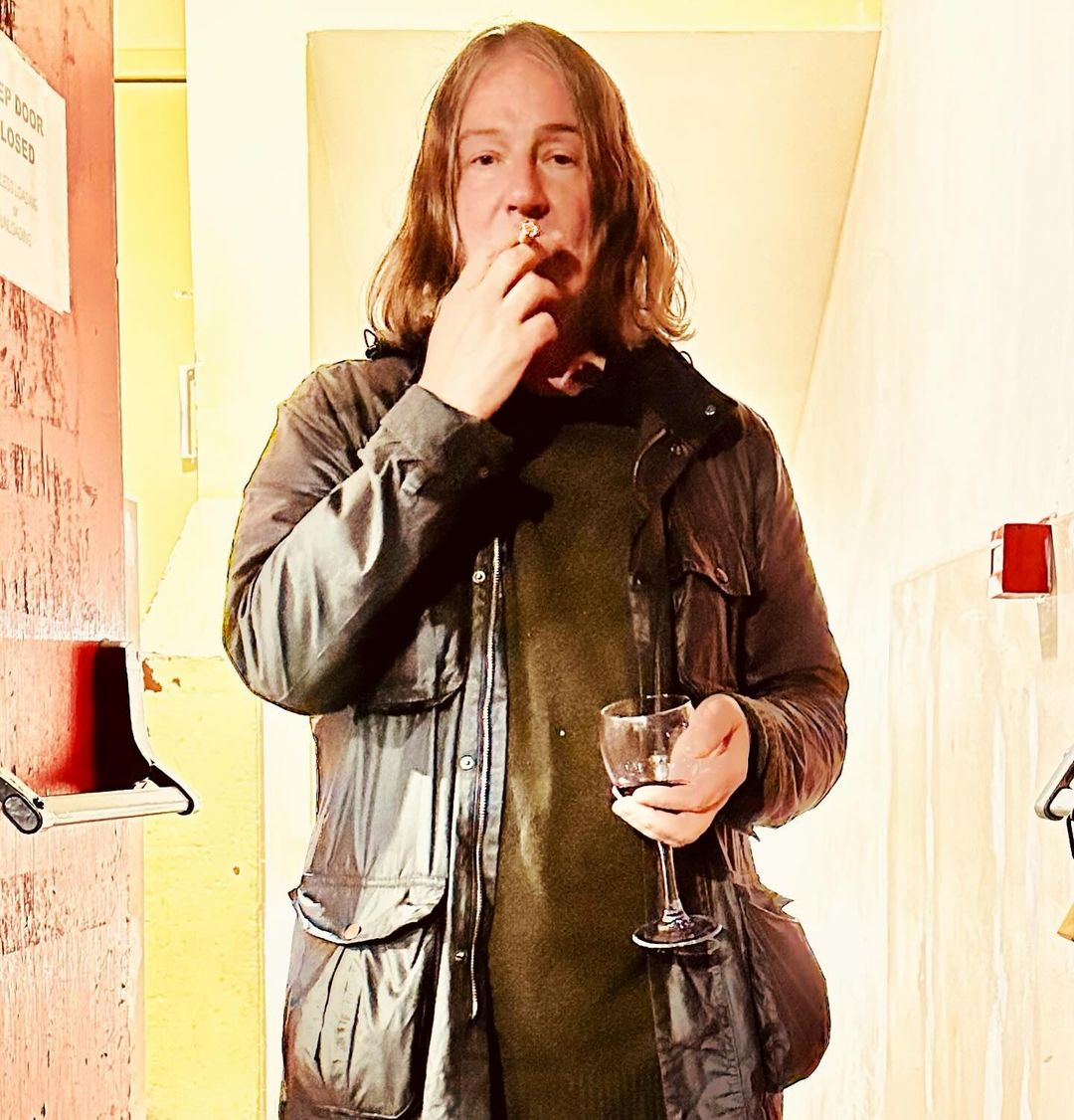
Stephen Lawrie (The Telescopes) getting ready to go on stage at Nice N Sleazy in Glasgow, 2023. Photographed by Greg Gutbezahl.

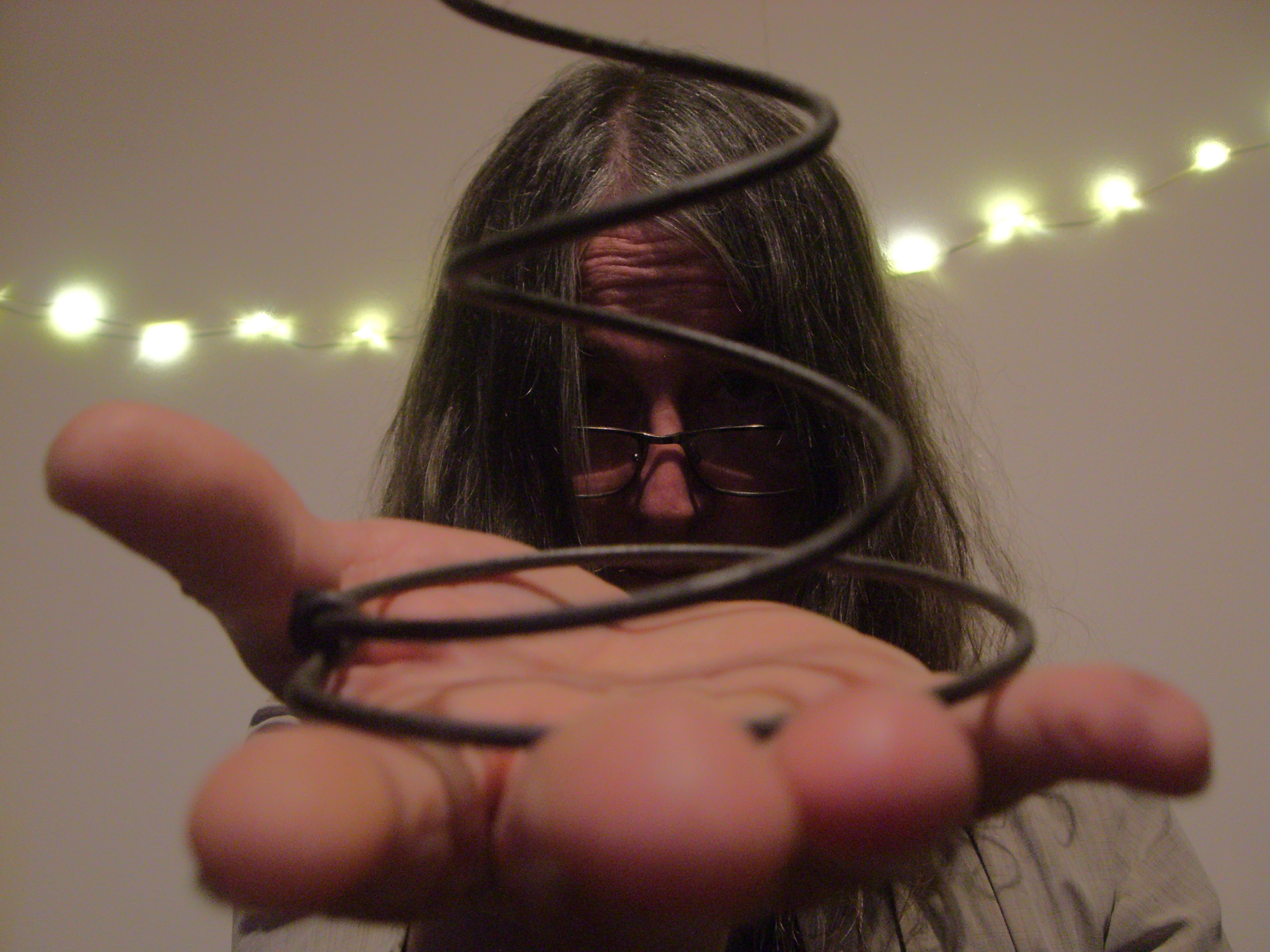
Stephen Lawrie (The Telescopes) Press Shot for the full-length album Experimental Health on Weisskalt, 2023.

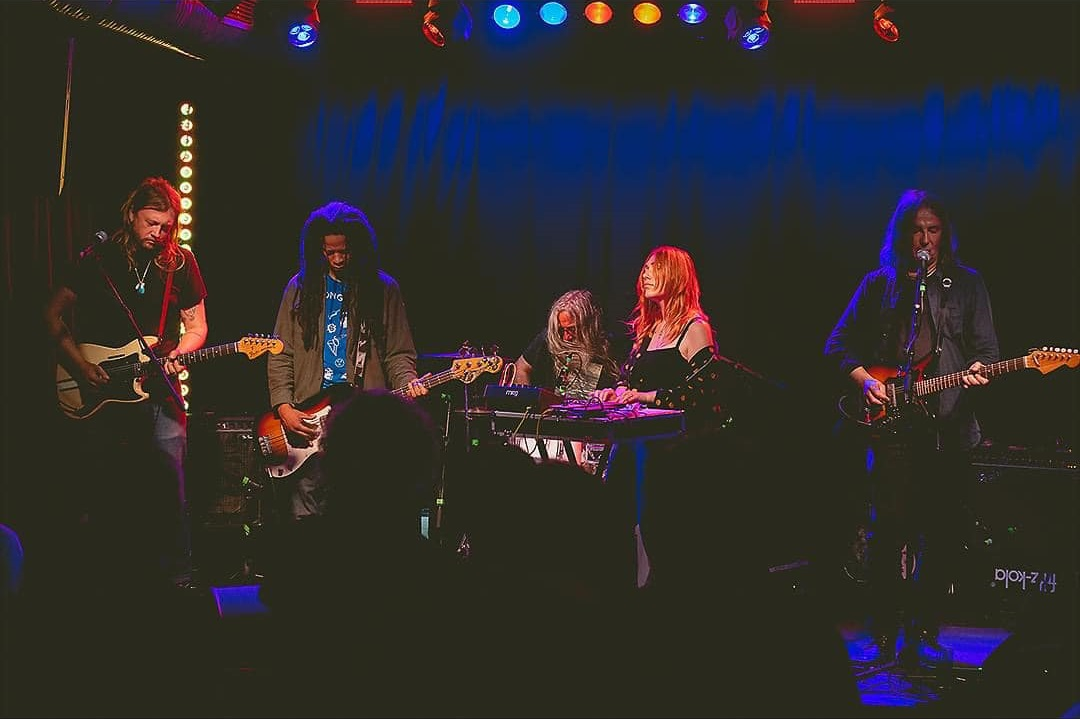
The Telescopes current line up, 2023.

The Telescopes are an English noise, space rock, dream pop and psychedelic band formed in 1987 by artist, composer, and musician Stephen Lawrie, with band members David Fitzgerald and Joanna Doran joining later. The band's line-up is in constant flux; there can be anywhere between 1 and 20 members on a recording.

Some of the initial influences on Lawrie as a songwriter were The Beatles, Bob Dylan, David Bowie, Neil Young, Einstürzende Neubauten, Can, Faust, Lydia Lunch, Sonic Youth and Sun Ra. By the time The Telescopes were formed, influences were drawn from artists such as The Velvet Underground, Suicide, The Stooges and The 13th Floor Elevators.

The Telescopes have influenced the shoegaze, space rock and neo-psychedelic movement including artists such as The Brian Jonestown Massacre, Black Rebel Motorcycle Club, Füxa, The Warlocks, Revolver, Whipping Boy, Vanishing Lines, Seefeel, Ecstasy of Saint Theresa, Frances Bean Cobain, Portishead, Mogwai and Radiohead.

In recognition of their ongoing influence on a new generation of artists, a tribute compilation titled Anticipating Nowhere, A Homage To The Telescopes was released in 2016 by The Blog That Celebrates Itself Records. The album featured 17 Telescopes tracks covered by various artists from the Flavor Crystals, Jaguwar and One Unique Signal.

The Telescopes have been described by the British music press as "more a revolution of the psyche than a revolution of the sidewalk"; a thread consistent throughout a body of work spanning over 30 years.

The band has released 16 studio albums across various music labels including but not limited to Creation Records and Tapete Records with their most recent album Growing Eyes Become String out now on Fuzz Club Records. A new album is currently being recorded for Tapete.

As a live band, they are considered to be unique even in their niche, with positive reviews from publications such as Isolation (UK), "The Telescopes are such an important band. Such an important concept. They walk where other bands fear to tread and refuse to compromise their art. This is what makes them so vital on record and unmissable on stage."

Original guitarist David Fitzgerald died of cancer on 17 December 2020, aged 54. In a statement provided to NME, Lawrie wrote, "As a noise guitarist David was born beyond the realm of natural vision, a true original, in a field of his own."

== History ==
Their debut release was a split flexi disc with Loop on the Cheree label in 1988, which was given away with the Sowing Seeds fanzine. There followed their debut single, "Kick the Wall", and "7th# Disaster" also on Cheree Records. At this time the band consisted of Stephen Lawrie, David Fitzgerald (lead guitar), Joanna Doran (rhythm guitar), Robert Brooks (bass guitar) and Dominic Dillon (drums). They moved to the American What Goes On Records and released their debut album Taste and "The Perfect Needle" single which is perhaps their most famous song. A live album appeared on Fierce Records and following What Goes On's bankruptcy they signed to Creation Records. In contrast to Taste's noise-rock, a more laid back sound followed, described by journalist Alexis Petridis as having "an almost fragile sense of elegance and melody", and the band scraped the lower reaches of the UK Singles Chart with the single "Flying", and released The Telescopes, their second album, in 1992. Lawrie explained the change in direction: "Your idea of perfection changes as you move on. I think we still hold the same approach to our music now, we still try just as many mad ideas, it's just a lot more subtle and works to a different end".

In 2002 they returned with Third Wave on Double Agent Records. In 2005 they released their fourth album #4 on their own Antenna Records. By this time they were a much more experimental band specialising in electronic soundscapes. In July 2011, the band were invited by Portishead to perform at the ATP I'll Be Your Mirror at Alexandra Palace in London, where they performed songs from their debut album. An event repeated at Austin Psych Fest 2012 curated by The Reverberation Appreciation Society.

In April 2012 came two new singles, the first a drone version of Nick Drake's "Black Eyed Dog" on the Trensmat label. The second, a new composition entitled "We See Magic and We Are Neutral, Unnecessary", was a flexi-postcard release on The Dream Machine label. A 2013 West coast tour of the US resulted in a new album "HARM" recorded live with the US-tour version of the band's lineup, consisting mostly of shoegaze band LSD and the Search for God, including Ricky Maymi of The Brian Jonestown Massacre. This album continued the band's drone experimentation, and was released by label Neon Sigh following their help in coordinating the tour. Further US tours followed in 2014 and 2016.

In 2015, the Hidden Fields album was released by German label Tapete Records. It was described by AllMusic as shoegaze and noise pop, but more song-based than recent releases.

Exploding Head Syndrome was released in 2019 on Tapete Records. Dagger says "if you find beauty in churning guitars, a groggy organ and Lawrie's half-mumbled lyrics (like I do) then you’ll find Exploding Head Syndrome to be the Raquel Welch of the year."

In 2021, Songs of Love and Revolution was released on Tapete Records. It was their fourth release with the label, followed up with Of Tomorrow in 2023.

In 2023, Experimental Health was released on Weisskalt Records. It is their third release with the label and was described as one of the most anticipated releases for 2023 by Beats Per Minute and Perkele.it.

== Discography ==
=== Studio albums ===
- Taste (1989)
- The Telescopes (1992, later reissued as # Untitled Second)
- Third Wave (2002)
- #4 (2005)
- Hungry Audio Tapes (2006)
- Infinite Suns (2008)
- Harm (2013)
- Hidden Fields (2015)
- As Light Return (2017)
- Stone Tape (2017)
- Exploding Head Syndrome (2019)
- Absence Presence (2020)
- Songs of Love and Revolution (2021)
- Experimental Health (2023)
- Of Tomorrow (2023)
- Growing Eyes Become String feat. One Unique Signal (2024)
- Editions (2024)
- Halo Moon (2024)

=== Singles ===
- "Forever Close Your Eyes" (1988) (split 7" flexi-disc with Loop)
- "Kick the Wall" (1989)
- "7th# Disaster" (1989)
- "The Perfect Needle" (1989)
- "To Kill a Slow Girl Walking" (1990)
- "Precious Little" (1990)
- "Everso" (1990)
- "Celeste" (1991)
- "Flying" (1991)
- "Where the Sky Is Low" / "Electric Sound of Summer" (2003) (split 7" with Füxa)
- "Mooga Destroya" (2003) (split 7" with Lo Casta)
- "Winter EP" (2004)
- "Live at Audioscope" (2005) (split 10" with Vibracathedral Orchestra)
- "Night Terrors" (2006)
- "Psychic Viewfinder" (2007)
- "Another Whip" (2007)
- "Landing Shadows" (2011)
- "Black Eyed Dog" (2012)
- "We See Magic and We Are Neutral, Unnecessary" (2012) (7" flexi-postcard)
- "I Wanna Be Your Dog" (2015) (split 10" with A Place to Bury Strangers)
- "Thrown" (2015) (split 7" with Deadly Cradle Death)
- "The Telescopes | Flavor Crystals" (2016) (split 12" with Flavor Crystals)
- "Strange Waves" (2019)
- "Where Do We Begin (Modares Remix)" (2023)

=== Collaborations ===
- Acetate Parade as Foam Giant (Flavor Crystals and The Telescopes) (2021)
- Under The Trees as Foam Giant (Flavor Crystals and The Telescopes) (2022)

=== Features ===
- Theremin, loops and engineering for It's Mashed Potato Time by Füxa for their 7" single Techno Light (2000)
- Vocals and ebow for Rainy Day Dream Away by Füxa from their album Füxa 2000 (2013)
- Vocals and effects (moogerfooger) for Hide Away by Füxa from their album Supercharged (2013)
- Vocals and noise guitars for Real Cool Time (Stooges Cover) with Füxa (2013)
- Vocals for Hate This Party by The Imajinary Friends from their self-titled album (2017)
- Drums for Vanishing Lines for their album No Replacement Found (2020)

=== Remixes ===
- Italian Air by Charles Atlas for the compilation Fabricate (2004)
- Crystal by Jaguwar from their album Ringthing (2017)
- Schmwarf (The Telescopes Threw A Way Through Experimental Health Version) by CAMERA from their album Prosthuman (2023)

=== Live albums ===
- Trade Mark Of Quality (1990)
- Live At Norwich Arts Centre 1988 (2007)
- Live. Aftertaste (2011)
- Live at Corsica Studios (2012)
- Live at Spacefest! (2015)
- Live Sessions (2020)
- fwrd / rvrs (2022)

=== Compilation albums ===
- As Approved by the Committee (2003)
- Premonitions 1989–1991 (2003)
- Altered Perception (2004)
- Compilation Capitalrecordings / Involve (2004)
- Singles Compilation 1989–1991 (2008)
- Singles No. 2 (2009)
- Splashdown – The Complete Creation Recordings 1990–1992 (2015)
- Still In A Dream: A Story of Shoegaze 1988–1995 (2016)
- Earthen: A Cold Spring Sampler (New Version) (2018)
- Losing Touch With My Mind: Psychedelia In Britain 1986–1990 (2019)
- Eclectica: Volume II - Transcending The Echo Chamber (2019)
- C90 (2020)
- eclectica: volume xi (cosmic reverence) (2020)
- Come Together: Adventures On The Indie Dancefloor 1989–1992 (2023)
- eclectica: iv (2024)
