= Wobble (album) =

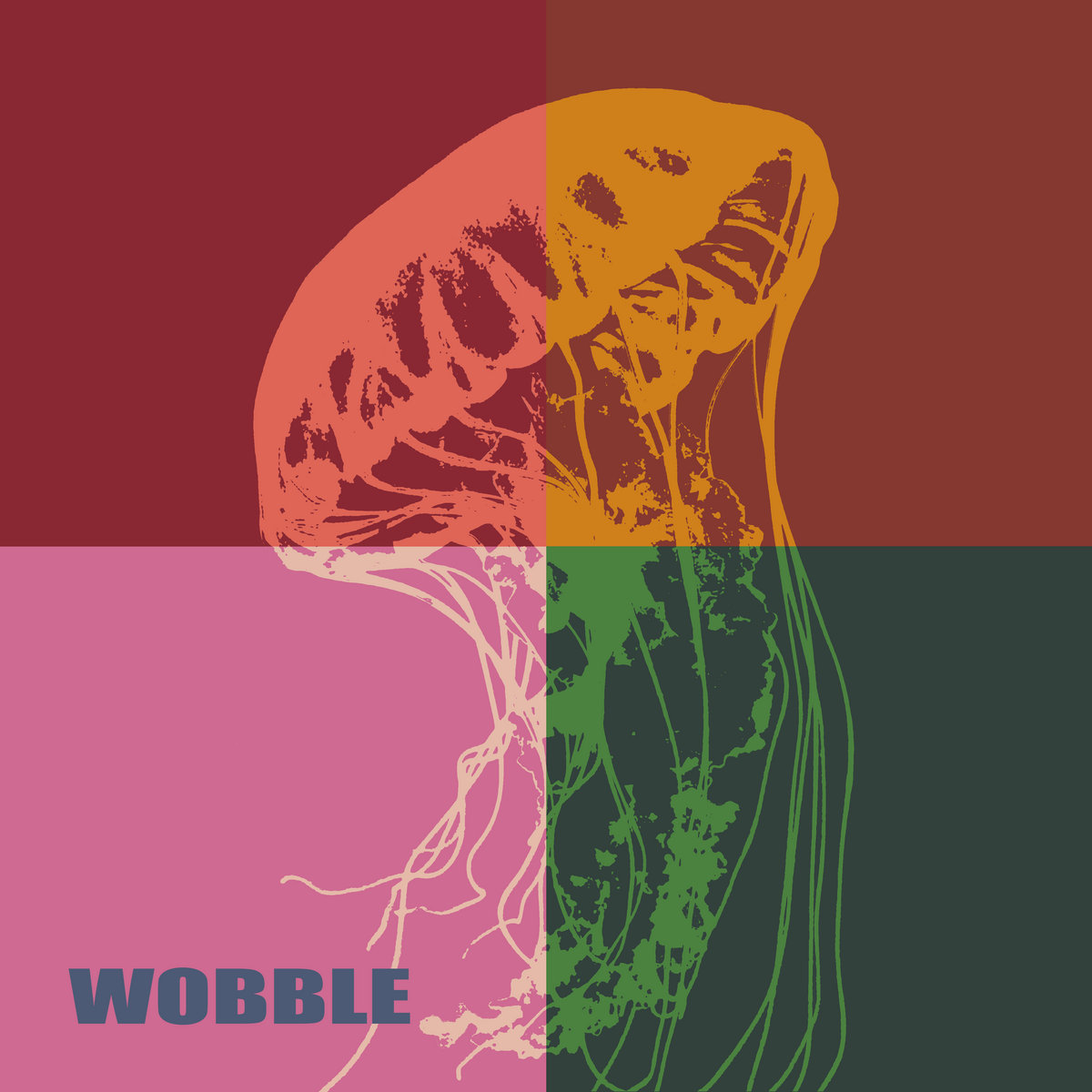

Studio album by Black Market Karma
- Released: 26 July 2024
- Genre: Alternative rock; electronica; experimental; hip hop; pop; psychedelia
- Length: 43 minutes
- Label: Fuzz Club Records

Wobble is the eleventh studio album by English rock band Black Market Karma. It was released on July 26, 2024, by Fuzz Club Records.

== Background ==
The second album in the set is scheduled for release with Fuzz Club Records.

Thematically, the album emulates certain features of analogue recording equipment to evoke a sense of nostalgia for a place that the listener has never literally experienced. As band-leader, multi-instrumentalist and core songwriter Stanley Belton explains, “Sonically, I wanted the album to feel like a collection of discarded and worse for wear instruments came to life, refurbished themselves and started to play. The sound is an attempt to give form to the often formless feeling that is nostalgia. With songs attempting to crystallise a feeling known as ‘fernweh’. A kind of longing for a place and time you’ve never experienced, be it in this world or another.”

In some interviews, Belton describes how as formats evolve to phase out perceived imperfections in analogue technology, he sought to return these characteristics. The aim was to give the sound a lo-fi evocation and aesthetic but with clarity and strength. The vintage guitars are processed by effects with lead melodies often played on bass run through overloaded Vox guitar amps. These are then topped heavily with other sounds from an eclectic collection of instruments.

== Critical reception ==
The record has received positive feedback with The Sleeping Shaman's Domenico ‘Mimmo’ Caccamo praising the album, "The fact that the album contains five instrumental melodiously flowing tracks, does not mean that Belton was short of stories. The man is a storyteller who knows how to convey them with his impeccable musical expressiveness. A solid 8/10 and growing."

Loz Etheridge from God Is In The TV has described Wobble as hypnotic and trance-like.

== Track listing ==
All tracks are written by Stanley Belton.

Wobble track listing
No.	Title	Length
1.	"Mushy Conscience"	2:57
2.	"Oozer"	3:34
3.	"Lead Laces"	3:07
4.	"Waterbaby"	2:51
5.	"Sonic Broth Soul Taster"	5:05
6.	"Puddle Eyed Sponger"	3:53
7.	"Going On Easy"	3:49
8.	"Thin Wild Mercury"	2:58
9.	"The Din of an Ending"	3:58
10.	"Olive"	1:43
11.	"The Death Throes of Nuance"	4:28
12.	"Stepping Loose"	4:02
