= Duress (disambiguation) =

Duress is threatening someone to act against their will.

Duress may also refer to:

- Necessity and duress
- Duress in American law
- Duress in English law
- Duress (film)
- Duress: Imperial Durabilities in Our Times
- "Duress", an episode of Revenge
