= 4 (The Telescopes album) =

The Telescopes No. 4
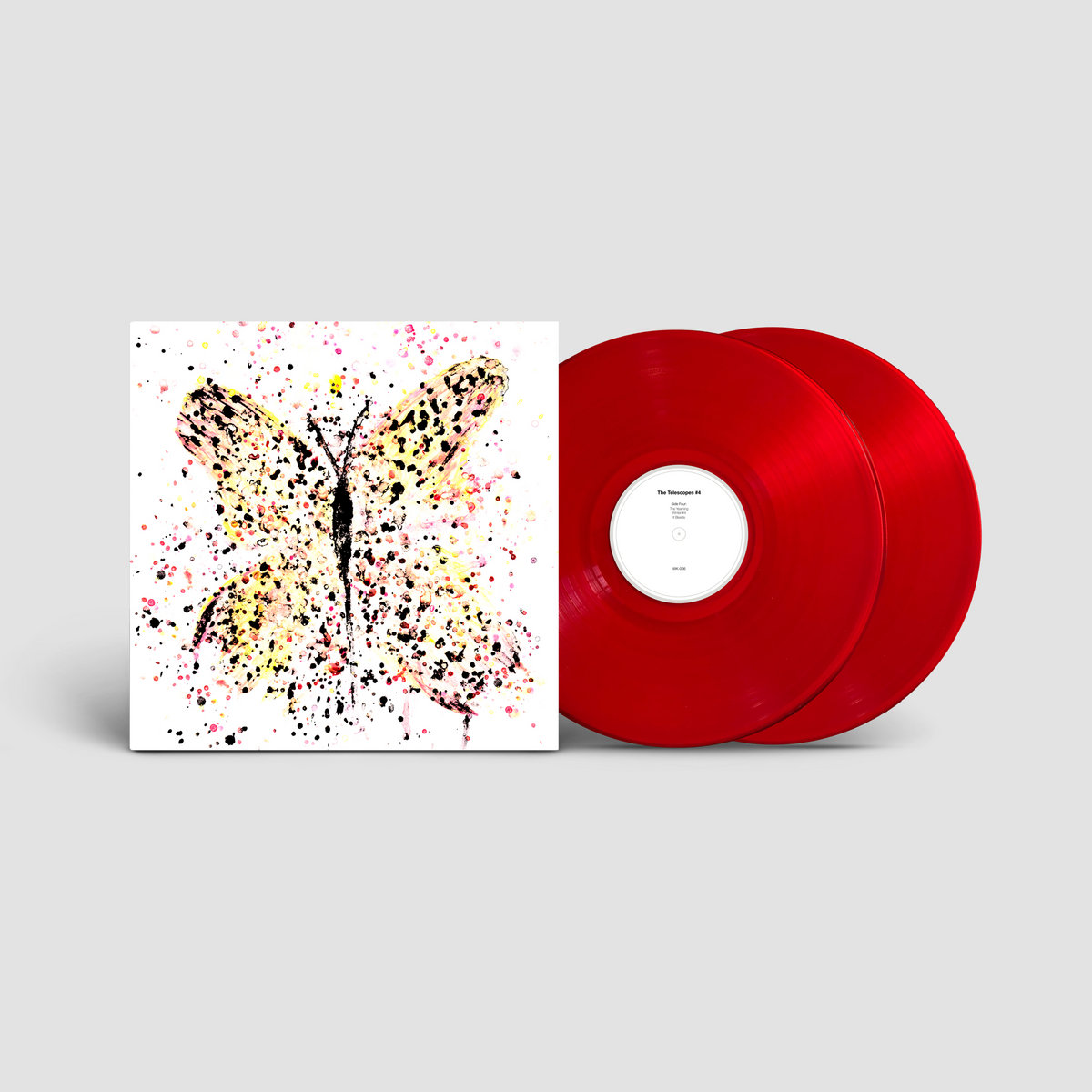

Studio album by The Telescopes
- Released: 21 October 2022
- Genre: Alternative rock; Ambient; Drone; Electronica; experimental; Folk; Free Improvisation; Improvisation; Noise; Noise Rock; Psychedelia; Shoegaze; Sound Art; Space Rock; Soundtrack
- Length: 50 minutes
- Label: Weisskalt Records and Antenna Records

#4 is the fourth studio album by English noise rock band The Telescopes composed and recorded between 2002 and 2004. It was initially released on CD by their own label Antenna Records in 2005, later reissued by Weisskalt Records on vinyl in 2022 on a limited edition of 300. To commemorate its 20th anniversary on the basis of when recording began, the album was manufactured by longstanding Australian pressing plant Zenith on translucent red vinyl at 45rpm to draw out the subtleties and expansiveness of the sound.

== Background ==
The album is notable for Stephen Lawrie's further exploration of unconventional methods in electronic music, the result being reminiscent of "a missing David Lynch soundtrack." The release has been described as "shape shifting audio druidry and stone age free drone repetition. Mindscapes of merge and misheard whispers. Death rattles pulse driven twangs and broken bones."

In an interview with When The Sun Hits, Lawrie expressed the emotive drive behind the experimentation with noise, "Songs are written. Even when they seem to fall from nowhere. But I think and dream in noise."

Part of the musical virtuosity and innovation demonstrated by Lawrie's composing skills included playing the guitar in a non-traditional way thereby disguising the instrument through distortion of sound. As Lawrie explained in an interview with It's Psychedelic Baby! Magazine's Klemen Breznikar, some of the guitars were table top guitars laid flat in experimental tunings, manipulated with whatever delivered inspiration. Objects such as crocodile clips, battery operated hand fans, cello bows, tin toys, gear stick knobs, remote controls on the pick ups were all used for experimentation which for Lawrie, turned the guitar into a fresh instrument, causing him to think differently and develop new pathways.

The majority of the songs were written on an EDP Wasp synth which contributed to the deep throbbing sound present throughout the album.

== Critical reception ==
The album has received positive reception and is considered to be an underrated cult classic among music journalists and how it is representative of The Telescopes continued exploration of noise, feedback and the soundscapes developed from such boundary pushing.

NME's Nathaniel Cramp has described the record as "in another universe...creating some incredible and genuinely scary music."

Dusted Magazine's Jon Dale highlighted the track All the Leaves, writing "Sometimes The Telescopes surrender to graceful beauty, as on #4's "All the Leaves". These poised, charming melodies recall their untitled second album, where quiescent songs flickered from within a heat chamber, walls glossed with steam and fog."

== Track listing ==
All music by Stephen Lawrie.

#4 track listing
No.	Title	Length
1.	"the hypnotic pulse of the motor driven"	6:12
2.	"link No. 1"	5:05
3.	"on a dead man's bones by the light of the moon, skeletons dance a demon dance of the doomed"	8:40
4.	"all the leaves"	2:41
5.	"a measure of imbalance"	0:43
6.	"singularity"	4:26
7.	"fear the eye became the tone"	9:22
8.	"the yearning"	1:35
9.	"winter No. 4"	5:03
10.	"it bleeds"	5:52

== Credits ==
- Artwork By – Andrea Edwards.
- Electric Guitar, Acoustic guitar, Vocals, Slide guitar, Synthesizer – Jo Doran.
- Electric Guitar, Theremin, Noises, Effects, Electronics, Double bass, Synthesizer – Lorin Halsall.
- Mastered By – Phil England.
- Noises, Flugelhorn, Banjo, Trombone, Bodhrán, Shanai – Jerry Hope.
- Recorded By, engineer, Arranged By, Music By – The Telescopes.
- Synthesizer, Effects, Keyboards, Tape, Noises, Xylophone, Percussion, Acoustic Guitar, Loops, Electronics, Turntables, Organ, Theremin, Maracas, Electric Bass, Drums, Tambourine, Piano, Tin whistle, Banjo, Vocals, Recorded By, engineer, Mixed By, producer, Arranged By, Lyrics By, Music By, Artwork – Stephen Lawrie.

=== Notes ===
Recorded at The Experimental Health Unit, Wired Studio, Jerry's House, & Far Heath Studio between 2002 & 2004. Mixed at The Experimental Health Unit, 2004–2005. Vinyl pressing by Zenith, 2022.
