= Tess Parks =

Canadian singer-songwriter

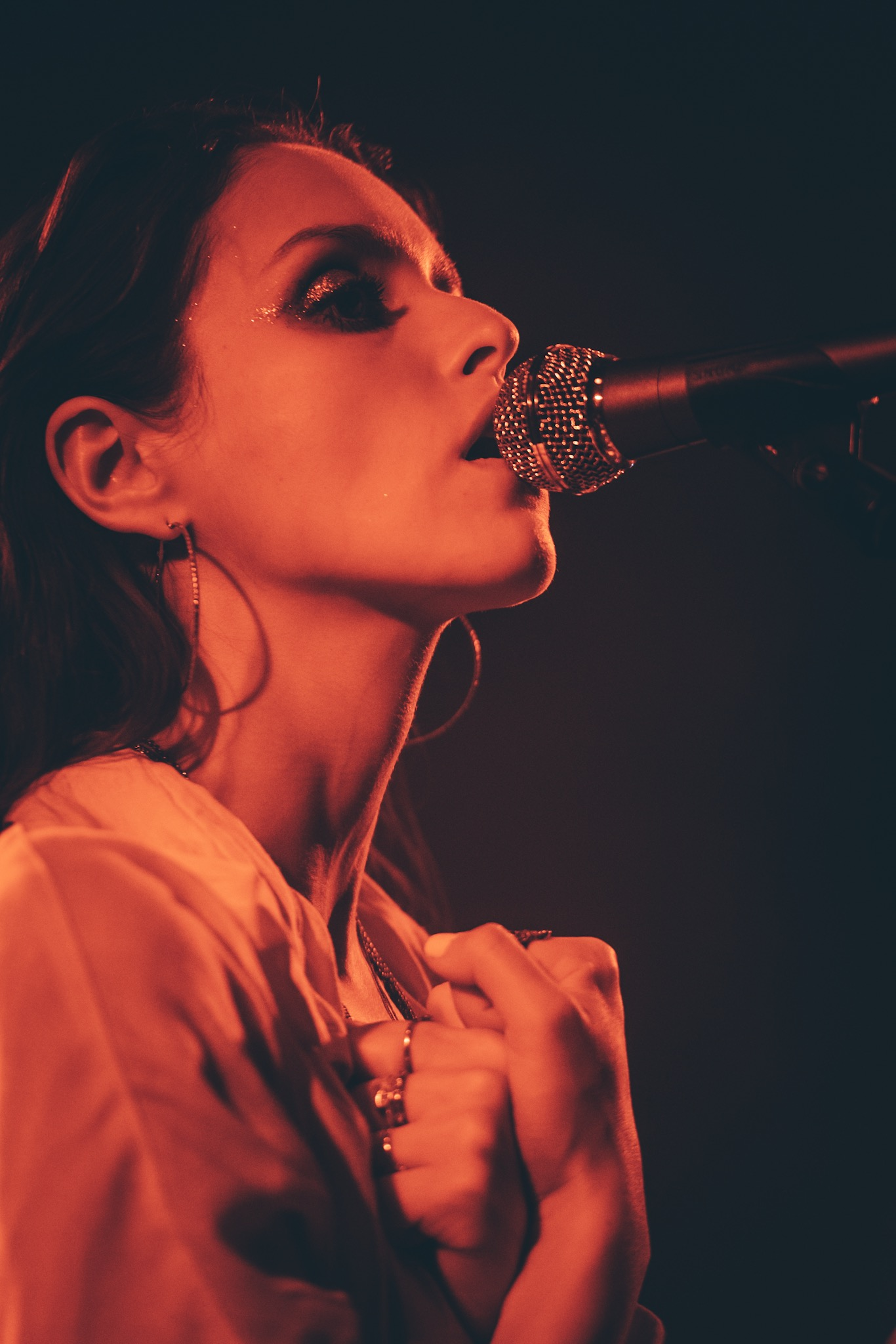
- Parks performing in 2019

Background information
- Born: October 15, 1990 (age 35); Toronto, Canada
- Genres: Psychedelic rock; singer-songwriter
- Occupations: Singer-songwriter; musician; photographer
- Instruments: Vocals; guitar
- Years active: 2011–present
- Labels: 359 Records; 'A' Records; Fuzz Club Records
- Website: tessparks.com

Tess Parks (born 1990) is a Canadian singer-songwriter and photographer from Toronto. Having released five studio albums, Parks is known for her dreamy psychedelic music. Among others, Parks has collaborated with Brian Jonestown Massacre front figure Anton Newcombe on two albums.

== Biography ==
Tess Parks was born and raised in Toronto. An Oasis concert in 2002 inspired her to begin playing guitar. Parks moved to London at age 17 to attend art school, but dropped out to focus on her music career. She was signed by Alan McGee to his record label 359 Music. Parks released her debut album Blood Hot in 2013.

Following the critical success of her debut, Parks collaborated with Anton Newcombe of The Brian Jonestown Massacre on the two following albums. After taking a break from music, her next album And Those Who Were Seen Dancing were released in 2022. The album's title is taken from a sentence often misquoted as written by German philosopher Friedrich Nietzsche among others. Parks' latest album Pomegranate was released on October 25, 2024, and features a collaboration with songwriter Ruari Meehan.

== Discography ==
=== Studio albums ===
- Blood Hot (2013)
- I Declare Nothing (2015)
- Tess Parks & Anton Newcombe (2018)
- And Those Who Were Seen Dancing (2022)
- Pomegranate (2024)
