= BPM (magazine) =

American magazine

BPM Mag
- BPM cover
- Editor: BPM Mag
- Categories: culture, news, music, videos, lifestyle, interviews
- Founded: 1996, relaunch in 2021
- Company: BPM Media
- Country: France
- Based in: Ibiza, Spain
- Language: English

BPM (Beats Per Minute) is an American magazine, launched in 1996 in Hollywood, California, publishing original content on Music, Technology, Nightlife and Style. BPM relaunched in December 2011 after a brief hiatus as the BPM network, with a mix of original content and curated material from key websites focused on electronic dance music.

After another long hiatus, the magazine was reborn in 2021, in Europe under a new digital-native version, still covering Electronic Music through Culture, News, Music, Videos, Lifestyle and Interviews.
