= Head (music) =

Term in music

The head of a piece of music is its main theme or melody, particularly in jazz. There is a related musical direction, D.C. or da capo (Italian, from head), which means to go back to the very beginning of the sheet music and play to the end, typically ignoring all repeat signs.

== Overview ==
In simple terms, the head can be thought of as the melody of a tune: it is the part of the song one hums when thinking back on it. Further, in a jazz context, the head is the tune's fingerprint, as it is what differentiates one song from another. For example, the jazz standards I Got Rhythm and Oleo (an example of a contrafact) use exactly the same chord progression but have different heads, making them unique.

An example of a lead sheet, which displays information about the head—melody, chords, and sometimes lyrics—of a tune.

A tune's head a combination of elements: the chords, melody, and potentially lyrics if there are words to the piece. There are often large differences in performances of jazz standards between different artists, leading to differences in transcribed lead sheets and charts and therefore heads.

A chart or lead sheet contains the head of a song. These are often only a page long in large print, will tell you:

- the key and time signature
- the melody
- the set of chord changes (referred to simply as "the changes"), and
- sometimes, but rarely, lyrics

as well as more general information such as

- the title and author of the piece
- indications of style, tempo, dynamics and form.

The form is an even more general and abstract concept dealing with the theoretical context in which the actual music is being played: the chord progression, its sections and other miscellaneous events such as kicks or time changes are all important information that the performers must keep track of. Two important standard forms over which hundreds of heads have been written are the 12-bar blues and rhythm changes. Some heads are based on the forms of other tunes, such as Charlie Parker's "Ornithology", which is based on Morgan Lewis's "How High the Moon" (another example of a contrafact).

Fake books may contain anywhere from a handful to hundreds of charts like these, occasionally stretching into two pages and on rare occasions going further and requiring page turns. There are many heads that are considered such a part of standard jazz repertoire that professional players are expected to know them by memory and be able to perform them in a variety of ways on the spot.

== Use ==
In playing the music, the head refers to any time the band or musician plays the theme to the song. Usually this happens once or twice at the beginning and the end of a performance. For example, many Clifford Brown recordings characteristically feature a short piano intro, the head, several choruses of solos and a recapitulation of the head followed by an outro coda. Although it most commonly is, the head does not need to be played at both the beginning and the end of a performance, and is occasionally played in the middle, for instance between solos.

Head In and Head Out are commonly used to refer to the first and last heads [of a piece] played.

Jazz musicians often give each other the "head" or "top" cue by patting their hand on top of their head, which is usually meant to make sure everybody "goes back to the head," or starts playing the head again the next time the "top of the form" comes around. On the unfortunate occasion this may be due to confusion about "where" the top of the form actually is if the musicians get off-sync with one another, or a frantic attempt to regain composure and finish the performance, as playing the head to end a piece is default jam session protocol.

== Knowing heads ==
Jazz musicians are frequently called upon to play a series of songs in short order with no planning, either at jam sessions or impromptu gigs. Therefore, it is important for professionals to know as wide a variety of tunes as possible and be able to play them proficiently. Most of the time this means memorizing the melody, chords and anything else important about playing the song with a band. Sometimes there will be fake books available at jam sessions, and sometimes it is easy to recall a tune while playing it or learn it on the spot, but for the most part it is expected that professional jazz musicians have a very large vocabulary of tunes available by memory.
