= Lollapalooza Argentina =

Argentinian annual music festival

- Genre: Alternative rock; punk rock; heavy metal; pop; hip hop; electronic; soul; trap; cumbia; rap
- Frequency: Annually
- Locations: Hipódromo de San Isidro, Buenos Aires
- Years active: 2014–2019, 2022–present
- Inaugurated: April 1, 2014; 12 years ago
- Founders: Perry Farrell
- Most recent: March 15, 2026; 8 months ago
- Next event: March 12, 2027; 3 months' time
- Attendance: 300,000
- Website: lollapaloozaar.com

Lollapalooza Argentina (/ˌlɒləpəˈluːzə/) is an annual Argentinian three-day music festival held in Hipódromo de San Isidro in Buenos Aires. It originally started as an event in 1991 in Chicago, becoming its official argentinian version in 2014. Music genres include alternative rock, heavy metal, punk rock, hip hop, and electronic dance music, also as more local popular genres such as trap and cumbia. Lollapalooza has also featured visual arts, nonprofit organizations, and political organizations. The festival hosts an estimated 300,000 people each March and sells out annually. Lollapalooza is one of the largest and longest-running music festivals in Argentina.

== History ==
The first edition of the Lollapalooza Argentina festival took place in Buenos Aires on April 1–2, 2014. The artist lineup for this inaugural edition had been announced on November 2, 2013, at the same time the "early bird" tickets went on sale—marking the only time tickets and the lineup were released simultaneously. Both local and international bands performed at the event, which began just after noon and lasted until midnight. Organizers estimated that over 130,000 people attended the venue across the two-day festival. Four stages were set up —Main Stage 1, Main Stage 2, Alternative, and Perry's Stage— offering a variety of musical styles and attracting a diverse crowd. A fifth stage named Kidzapalooza presents a special line-up for children.

Since its 2018 edition, the festival became officially a three-day event, thought the last day had to be cancelled due to heavy rains and massive stage destruction.

Originally, Lollapalooza 2020 was scheduled to take place from March 27 to 29, 2020, but due to the COVID-19 pandemic, it was postponed to November 27–29, 2021. However, in October 2021, the event was postponed once again until 2022. Following the postponements of the event over the previous two years, it was announced that Lollapalooza Argentina 2022 would take place from March 18 to 20, 2022, at the Hipódromo de San Isidro.

Latest edition presented 72 performances, presenting Tyler, the Creator, Turnstile, Lorde, Chappell Roan, Skrillex, Lewis Capaldi, Paulo Londra, Doechii, Deftones and Sabrina Carpenter as headliners in a three-day event held from March 13 to 15 where it has been announced that the following edition will take place at the same location on March 12–14, 2027.

== Editions ==
Edition	Dates	Main Stage 1	Main Stage 2	Alternative Stage	Perry's Stage	Days
2014	April 1, 2014	**Arcade Fire**; Phoenix; Julian Casablancas; Capital Cities; Onda Vaga; Intrépidos Navegantes	**Nine Inch Nails**; Imagine Dragons; Cage the Elephant; Juana Molina; Sig Ragga; Walter Dominguez	New Order; Lorde; Jake Bugg; Portugal. The Man; Nacao Zumbi; Aloe	Zedd; Kid Cudi; Wolfgang Gartner; Flux Pavilion; Flume; Nairobi; Dietrich; Franco V	2
2014	April 2, 2014	**Red Hot Chili Peppers**; Pixies; Ellie Goulding; Jovanotti; Airbag; La Armada Cósmica	**Soundgarden**; Vampire Weekend; Johnny Marr; Él Mató a un Policía Motorizado; La Bomba de Tiempo	Illya Kuryaki and the Valderramas; AFI; Pez; Savages; Detonantes	Axwell; The Bloody Beetroots; Krewella; Baauer; Perryetty; DJ Paul; RVSB; Búlgara	2
2015	March 21, 2015	**Jack White**; **Foster the People**; Interpol; Ed Motta; Fernández Fierro	**Calvin Harris**; **Robert Plant**; The Kooks; St. Vincent; Leiva; Miss Bolivia	Cypress Hill; Chet Faker; Molotov; Three Days Grace; Francisca y los Exploradores; Despertar Antoles	Nicky Romero; Robin Schulz; The Chainsmokers; Carnage; Kill the Noise; Maxi Trusso; Tommy Druetta; Hipnótica	2
2015	March 22, 2015	**Pharrell Williams**; Kasabian; Alt-J; Rudimental; Boom Pam	**Skrillex**; **The Smashing Pumpkins**; Bastille; Pedro Aznar; Fitz and the Tantrums; Quique Neira	Damian Marley; The Last Internationale; KONGOS; Dancing Mood; Sambara	Major Lazer; DJ Snake; Dillon Francis; Ritmo Machine; Big Gigantic; Poncho; Chancha Vía Circuito; Zero Kill; Jvlian	2
2016	March 18, 2016	**Eminem**; Of Monsters and Men; Jungle; Eagles of Death Metal; Sig Ragga	**Jack Ü** Tame Impala; Twenty One Pilots; Walk the Moon; Meteoros; Stone Giants	Illya Kuryaki and the Valderramas; Halsey; Albert Hammond Jr. The Joy Formidable; Seeed; El Kuelgue; Eric Mandarina	Zedd; Duke Dumont; Flosstradamus; Gramatik; Jack Novak; Zuker; Solimano Live; Frane y la Faktor	2
2016	March 19, 2016	**Florence + The Machine**; Noel Gallagher's High Flying Birds; Alabama Shakes; Carajo; Eruca Sativa	Kaskade; **Mumford & Sons**; Brandon Flowers; Ghost; Vintage Trouble; Juan Ingaramo	Babasónicos; Marina & The Diamonds; Bad Religion; Odesza; Boom Boom Kid; Los Espíritus	Die Antwoord; RL Grime; Zeds Dead; A-Trak; Matthew Koma; Leo García; Festa Bros; Villa Diamante	2
2017	March 31, 2017	**Metallica**; Rancid; Cage the Elephant; León Gieco; Deny	The Chainsmokers; **The XX**; The 1975; Glass Animals; Silversun Pickups; La Máquina Camaleón	G-Eazy; Tove Lo; Vince Joy; Nicola Cruz; Campo; Palo Pandolfo; Huevo; Joystick	Marshmello; TCHAMI; Don Diablo; Alok; Poncho; DJ Paul; Fianru; Louta	2
2017	April 1, 2017	**The Strokes**; Two Door Cinema Club; Jimmy Eat World; Tegan and Sara; Bandalos Chinos	Flume; **The Weeknd**; Duran Duran; Catfish and the Bottlemen; Turf; Usted Señálemelo	Melanie Martinez; MØ; Lisandro Aristimuño; Malevo; Criolo; Los Yegros; El Plan de la Mariposa; Bestia Bebé; Un Planeta	Martin Garrix; Oliver Heldens; Nervo; Griz; Borgore; Mad Professor; Sara Hebe	2
2018	March 16, 2018	**Red Hot Chili Peppers**; Chance the Rapper; Anderson .Paak & The Free Nationals; Dante Spinetta; Clubz; Jakob Ogawa	Hardwell; **Imagine Dragons**; Royal Blood; Las Pelotas; Miranda! Indios; Ca7riel	Camila Cabello; Zara Larsson; Spoon; Oh Wonder; Mi Amigo Invencible; Militantes del Climax; El Jardín de Ordoñez	DVBBS; Alison Wonderland; What So Not; Shiba San; Satélite 23; Batalla de los Gallos; Mitú; DJ Who; Valdés	3
2018	March 17, 2018	**The Killers**; Liam Gallagher; Metronomy; The Neighbourhood; Marilina Bertoldi; Bambi	DJ Snake; **Lana Del Rey**; Khalid; Damas Gratis; Kaleo; Barco; Las Mejores se Acabaron	Wiz Khalifa; Mac Miller; Mac Demarco; Tash Sultana; Luca Bocci; Jesse Báez; Nene Almíbar	Yallow Claw; Deorro; Nghtmre; Louis the Child; Whethan; Batalla de los Gallos; Oriana; Metro Live; Halpe	3
2018	March 18, 2018; **Cancelled due to heavy rain**	~~**Pearl Jam**~~; The National; Milky Chance; Emmanuel Horvilleur; Aloe; Programa	~~Kygo~~; LCD Soundsystem; David Byrne; Mon Laferte; Zoé; Ela Mimus; Walter Domínguez and the Catboi	~~Bajofondo~~; Aurora; Volbeat; Los Espíritus; Octafonic; El Zar; Isla de Caras	~~Galantis~~; Dillon Francis; Alan Walker; Cheat Codes; Thomas Jack; Batalla de los Gallos; Nathy Peluso; Leo García + Benito Cerati; Pyura	3
2019	March 29, 2019	**Twenty One Pilots**; Interpol; Bring Me the Horizon; Kamasi Washington; Escalandrum; Conociendo Rusia; Telescopios	Steve Aoki; **Post Malone**; Jorge Drexler; Portugal. The Man; Parcels; Wos; 1915	Years & Years; Rüfüs Du Sol; Rosalía; Alex Anwandter; The Fever 333; La Grande	Zhu; RL Grime; Valentino Khan; Khea; Hippie Sabotage; Seven Kayne + Bhavi; Omar Varela & Mikka; Dakillah; Jetlag; Julio Victoria	3
2019	March 30, 2019	**Arctic Monkeys**; The 1975; Foals; Los Hermanos; Lelé; Alfonsina	Tiesto; **Sam Smith**; Fito Páez; Troye Sivan; Perotá Chingó; Ca7riel; Yataians	Macklemore; St. Vincent; Juana Molina; Jain; Perras on the Beach; Candelaria Zamar	KSHMR; Don Diablo; GTA; Loud Luxury; C. Tangana; Batalla de los Gallos; Sita Abellán; Dano; Catnapp; Coral Casino	3
2019	March 31, 2019	**Kendrick Lamar**; Paulo Londra; Greta Van Fleet; La Mona Jiménez; Lany; Barbi Recanati; Gativideo	Odesza; **Lenny Kravitz**; Caetano, Moreno, Zeca and Tom Veloso; Snow Patrol; Lali; Bambi; Tomi Morano	Vicentico; Jorja Smith; Clairo; Ama Lou; Salvapantallas; Agrupación Capitán	Dimitri Vegas & Like Mike; Fisher; Kungs; Cazzu; Gryffin; C.R.O.-Neo Pistea-Lucho SSJ; Bad Gyal; Metro Live; Mexican Jihad & Tayhana; Naomi Preizler	3
2020 Cancelled due to COVID-19 pandemic	Dates	Flow Music XP	Samsung Stage	Alternative Stage	Perry's Stage	3
2020 Cancelled due to COVID-19 pandemic	March 27, 2020	~~**Travis Scott**~~; Brockhampton; Duki; Nathy Peluso; J Mena; Maye; Lucía Tacchetti	~~**Martin Garrix**~~; Los Fabulosos Cadillacs; Rita Ora; Wos; Yungblud; La Delio Valdez; Feli Colina	~~A Day to Remember~~; King Princess; LP; AJR; Two Feet; Axel Fiks; Cimafunk; Alejo y Valentín	~~Deorro~~; Alok; Dillom; Boombox Carter; Sael; La Joaqui; Brandi Cyrus; FMS; Falke 912; Bianca Lif	3
2020 Cancelled due to COVID-19 pandemic	March 28, 2020	~~**The Strokes**~~; Vampire Weekend; Charli XCX; Él Mató a un Policía Motorizado; Fabiana Cantilo; Las Ligas Menores; Limón	~~Armin van Buuren~~; **Gwen Stefani**; Ratones Paranoicos; Litto Nebbia; Kali Uchis; Wallows; Ainda	~~Hayley Kiyoko~~; Kacey Musgraves; Emmanuel Horvilleur; Zoe Gotusso; Amaia; Girl Ultra; Paco Leiva	~~Illenium~~; R3hab; Jaden Smith; Rels B Paloma Mami; Young Beef; Trueno; D3fai; Ghetto Kids; Louly	3
2020 Cancelled due to COVID-19 pandemic	March 29, 2020	~~**Guns n' Roses**~~; Cage the Elephant; Airbag; Perry Farrell's Kind Heaven Orchestra; The Hu; El Buen Salvaje	~~Alan Walker~~; **Lana Del Rey**; The Lumineers; Lauv; Idles; Florian	~~James Blake~~; Rex Orange County; Mika; Masego; Natalie Pérez; Elsa y Elmar; Miranda Johansen	~~Rezz~~; Chris Lake; San Holo; Pabllo Vittar; YSY A Goldfish; Emilia; Metro Live; Dabow; Reydel	3
2021	Not held due to COVID-19 pandemic					
2022	Dates	Flow Stage	Samsung Stage	Alternative Stage	Perry's Stage	Days
2022	March 18, 2022	**Miley Cyrus**; Alesso; Wos; Emilia; Tai Verdes; Bruses; Rosario Ortega	Bizarrap; A$ap Rocky; Duki; A Day to Remember; Louta; Chita; Zenón Pereyra; Limón	Turnstile; Airbag; Marina; 070 Shake; Seven Kayne; Natalie Pérez; Axel Fiks; Ainda	Deorro; Alok; Dillom; Boombox Carter; Sael; La Joaqui; Brandi Cyrus; FMS; Falke 912; Bianca Lif	3
2022	March 19, 2022	**The Strokes**; **Machine Gun Kelly**; Nicki Nicole; Él Mató a un Policía Motorizado; JXDN; Clara Cava; Chiara Parravicini	Alan Walker; **Doja Cat**; Khea; Litto Nebbia; Two Feet; Derby Motoreta's Burrito Kachimba; Wiranda Johansen	Jack Harlow; Kahlani; LP; Lola Índigo; Marc Seguí; Girl Ultra; Moloko	Justin Quiles; Chris Lake; Ashnikko; Pabllo Vittar; Dani Ribba; FMS; Taichu; Kiddo Toto; D3FAI; Ghetto Kids; Lucía Tacchetti	3
2022	March 20, 2022	**Foo Fighters**; Jhay Cortez; Idles; The Wombats; Las Ligas Menores; Malena Villa	**Martin Garrix**; Babasónicos; Tiago PZK; Alessia Cara; Sen Senra; Celli; BB Asul	L-Gante; Channel Tres; Emmanuel Horvilleur; Remi Wolf; Paula Cendejas; Simona	Kaytranada; Goldfish; Alan Gómez + DJ Tao + Kaleb di Masi; Acru; FMS; Luck Ra; Saramalacara; Six Sex; Ronpe 99'; Reydel	3
2023	March 17, 2023	**Drake**; Chano; Tove Lo; Willow; Silvestre y la Naranja; An Espil; Nani	Armin van Buuren; **Rosalía**; Trueno; Aurora; Suki Waterhouse; The Change; Plastilina	Cigarettes After Sex; Marilina Bertoldi; The Rose; Dante Spinetta; Guitarricadelafuente; Paz Carrara; Guillermo Beresñak	Alison Wonderland; John Summit; Danny Ocean; Álvaro Díaz; Young Miko; Villano Antillano; Oscu; Flaca; Panther	3
2023	March 18, 2023	**Twenty One Pilots**; The 1975; Usted Señalemelo; Yungblud; 1915; Florian	Jamie XX; **Tame Impala**; Jane's Addiction; Wallows; Nafta; Fríolento; Melanie Williams & El Cabloide	Melanie Martinez; Catupecu Machu; Sofi Tukker; Elsa y Elmar; Kchiporros; Delfina Campos	Bresh; Purple Disco Machine; Fred Again; Mora; Nora En Pure; Rusowsky + Ralphie Choo; Ryan Castro; Papichamp; Brooke Carrey; Sassyggirl	3
2023	March 19, 2023	**Billie Eilish**; María Becerra; Diego Torres; Cami; Gauchito Club; Odd Mami; Mia Zeta	Skrillex; **Lil Nas X** Kali Uchis; Dorian Gray; Mother Mother; León Cordero; Camilú	Rise Against; Polo & Pan; Modest Mouse; Hot Milk; Judeline; Connie Isla; Mora Navarro	Clapton; Gorgon City; Tokischa; Callejero Fino; Gera MX; Rei; Rojuu; Muerejoven; Oh!Dulceari; Soui Uno	3
2024	March 15, 2024	**Blink 182**; The Offspring; Grupo Frontera; Jere Klein; Winona Riders; Daniela Milagros; Paula Prieto	Diplo; **Arcade Fire**; YSY A Fletcher; Juliana Gattas; Pacífica; Mujer Cebra	The Blaze; Ca7riel & Paco Amoroso; Peces Raros; NSQK; Jaze; El Culto Casero	Dom Dolla; MK; Mariano Mellino; Saiko; BB Trickz; Evlay; Oney1; Fiah Miau; Juana Rozas	3
2024	March 16, 2024	**Sza**; Phoenix; Jungle; Latin Mafia; Luca Bocci; Un Verano; Joelle	Above & Beyond; **Sam Smith**; Miranda! Kenia OS; Blair; Santi Muk; Mar Marzo	The Driver Era; Omar Apollo; Nothing but Thieves; Koino Yokan; Lia Kali; Santi Celli; Babeblade	Timmy Trumpet; Loud Luxury; Robleis; BM; Franzizca; Chico Blanco; Mechayrxmeo; Ill Quentin; Garoto 3000	3
2024	March 17, 2024	**Feid**; Thirty Seconds to Mars; Bandalos Chinos; Dayglow; Gale; Abril Olivera; Fin del Mundo	Meduza; **Limp Bizkit**; Hozier; Jessie Reyes; El Zar; Fermín; Joven Breakfast	King Gizzard & the Lizard Wizard; Bahvi; Pierce the Veil; León Larregui; Ximena Sariñana; Nenagenix; Mat Alba	Zhu; Dombresky; Overmono; Mesita; FMK; Alejo Isakk; Anita B Queen; Akriila; Trucha; Canals	3
2025	March 21, 2025	**Justin Timberlake**; Foster the People; Los Ángeles Azules; Ana Mena; Queralt Lahoz	Charlotte de Witte; **Alanis Morissette**; Ca7riel & Paco Amoroso; Parcels; Pablopablo; Milk Shake	Mon Laferte; Lasso; Nessa Barrett; Darumas; Vinocio	Blond:ish; Barry Can't Swim; Doblep; Micro TDH; Spreen x Matute; Planta; La Cintia	3
2025	March 22, 2025	**Shawn Mendes**; Tate McRae; The Marías; Arde Bogotá; Luz Gaggi; Juana Aguirre	~~Zedd~~; **Tool**; Wos; Inhaler; Nanpa Básico; Dum Chica	Teddy Swims; Sepultura; Wave to Earth; Artemas; Balthvs; Juan López	San Holo; La K'onga; Kasablanca; Salastkbron; Ponte Perro; Doly Flackko; Elena Rose; Soulfía; Samuraï	3
2025	March 23, 2025	**Olivia Rodrigo**; Benson Boone; Girl in Red; Chita; Lara Project; Estratósfera	**Rüfüs Du Sol**; **Tan Biónica**; Nathy Peluso; Michael Kiwanuka; Marina Reche; Francisco Victoria	Caribou; Rawayana; Fontaines D.C. Little Jesus; BB Asul; Lichi	James Hype; JPEGMafia; Disco Lines; La Malilla; Aron; Central Norte Crew: Brichtta Metal DJ Crew Etta! Lil Pani; Deyco	3
2026	March 13, 2026	**Tyler, the Creator**; **Turnstile**; Djo; Judeline; Tiger Mood	Peggy Gou; **Lorde**; Katseye; Royel Otis; Guitarricadelafuente; Mora Fisz	Turf; Danny Ocean; Balu Brigada; Militantes del Climax; Spaghetti Western	Yousuke Yukimatsu; Roz; Gordo; Easykid; Zell; Little Boogie; Victoria Whynot; Jero Jones	3
2026	March 14, 2026	**Chappell Roan**; Addison Rae; Marina; Lany; Joaquina	**Skrillex**; **Lewis Capaldi**; **Paulo Londra**; Ángela Torres; Nasa Histories; Tobika	Riize; TV Girl; Soledad; Timo; Marttein	Brutalismus 3000; 2hollis + Rommulas; Hamdi; Six Sex; Amigo de Artistas; Imbermind; Terra; Paula OS	3
2026	March 15, 2026	**Sabrina Carpenter**; **Doechii**; Blood Orange; Yami Safdie; 143Leti	Kygo; **Deftones**; Interpol; Viagra Boys; Massacre; Reybruja	Ratones Paranoicos; Men I Trust; Ruel; The Warning; Ryan	Ben Böhmer; BUNT. Ezequiel Arias; Horsegiirl; Saramalacara; Cerounno; Félix Vestre; Ludmila di Pascuale	3
2027	March 12, 2027	Travis Scott, Charli XCX, The Killers, TINI, David Guetta, Queens of the Stone Age, The Neighbourhood, Rawayana, Fontaines D.C., Sombr The Prodigy, Dillom, Malcolm Todd, Dominic Fike, Cage The Elephant, Geese, Raye, Lola Young, Slayyyter, Adéla, Un Poco de Ruido, Marlon Hoffstadt, Four Tet, Angine de Poitrine, Tomora, K4os, Leon Bridges, Usted Señálemelo, Boys Noize, Snow Strippers, Carlita, Sammy Virji, Ninajirachi, Julia Wolf, Die Spitz, Yorghaki, The Avalanches, Rivo, Boy Harsher, Mateo Dufour, Amaia, Midnight Generation, Mind Enterprises, Ayybo, Juan Hansen, Violet Grohl, Ela Taubert, Enzocerobulto, Juana Rozas, Francisca Valenzuela, Broke Carrey, Princesa Alba, Lolu Menayed, Folgar, Tiga, Santos Bravos, Daniela Spalla, Kchiporros, Natalia Lacunza, Zé Pequeña, Sofía Mora, Dandára, Joaco Burgos, Ara, Palo, Fabrizio, Mai Lawson, Hana Fox, Varese, Sol Porro, Hellolola, Molle, Pato Mallet, Las Sombras, La Ramona				3
2027	March 13, 2027					3
2027	March 14, 2027					3

Notes

Headliners in bold
Replacements in italics
Cancellations ~~overlined~~

== Most appearances ==
Edition with the artist as a headliner in bold.

Performances	Artist
3	Interpol (2015, 2019, 2026), Marina (2016, 2022, 2026), Skrillex (**2015**, 2023, **2026**), The 1975 (2017, 2019, 2023), Twenty One Pilots (2016, **2019**, **2023**), Wos (2019, 2022, 2025)
2	1915 (2019, 2023), Airbag (2014, 2022), Arcade Fire (2014, 2024), Babasónicos (2016, **2022**), Bambi (2018, 2019), Bandalos Chinos (2017, 2024), BB Asul (2022, 2025), Ca7riel (2018, 2019), Ca7riel & Paco Amoroso (2024, 2025), Cage the Elephant (2014, 2017), Él Mató a un Policía Motorizado (2014, 2022), Foster the People (2015, 2025), Guitarricadelafuente (2023, 2026), Illya Kuryaki and the Valderramas (2014, 2016), Imagine Dragons (2014, **2018**), Juana Molina (2014, 2019), Judeline (2023, 2026), Jungle (2016, 2024), Lorde (2014, **2026**), Martin Garrix (2017, 2022), Melanie Martinez (2017, 2023), Miranda! (2018, 2024), Mon Laferte (2018, 2025), Parcels (2019, 2025), Paulo Londra (2019, **2026**), Red Hot Chili Peppers (**2014**, **2018**), Rosalía (2019, **2023**), Rüfüs Du Sol (2019, **2025**), Sam Smith (**2019**, **2024**), Saramalacara (2022, 2026), Sig Ragga (2014, 2015), The Strokes (**2017**, **2022**), Turf (2017, 2026), Turnstile (2019, **2026**), Zedd (2014, 2016)

== See also ==
- Lollapalooza
- List of historic rock festivals
- List of music festivals
- "Homerpalooza", a 1996 episode of The Simpsons
- Alapalooza, a 1993 album by "Weird Al" Yankovic
