= Currents Tour =

2015–18 concert tour by Tame Impala

- Tour by Tame Impala
- Promotional poster for European tour dates in 2016.
- Location: North America; Latin America; Europe; Asia; Oceania
- Associated album: Currents
- Start date: April 8, 2015
- End date: October 14, 2018
- No. of shows: 135
- Supporting acts: Broncho; Kuroma; Mini Mansions; Nicholas Allbrook; LA Priest; Koi Child; Kirin J. Callinan; Lord Fascinator; Silicon; Jagwar Ma; Alvvays; Pastel Lite; Benjamin Booker; M83; Mac DeMarco; Unknown Mortal Orchestra; CLUBZ

Tame Impala concert chronology
- Lonerism Tour (2012–14); Currents Tour (2015–18); World Tour 2019 (2019)

The Currents Tour was a worldwide concert tour by Tame Impala, the Australian psychedelic music project of Kevin Parker in support of their third studio album Currents. It began on April 8, 2015, at the Fox Theater in Pomona. and concluded on October 14, 2018 at Treasure Island Music Festival in Oakland. Broncho, Mini Mansions, Kuroma, Nicholas Allbrook, LA Priest, Koi Child, Kirin J. Callinan, Lord Fascinator, Silicon, Jagwar Ma, Alvvays, Pastel Lite, Benjamin Booker, M83, Mac DeMarco, Unknown Mortal Orchestra, and CLUBZ performed as the supporting acts.

== Background ==
On January 6, 2015, Tame Impala was announced as part of the lineup for Coachella 2015 performing on the main stage during both weekends.

After releasing the single "Let It Happen", Tame Impala would announce their U.S. Tour on March 10, 2015.

The third studio album, Currents, was announced on April 4, 2015. The announcement was followed by the release of "'Cause I'm a Man". The album was released on July 17, 2015 to widespread acclaim from fans and music critics alike.

On April 29, 2015, Kevin Parker did an "Ask me Anything" (AMA) on Reddit, somebody asked him what questions he wanted, in which he responded that he was waiting for someone to ask him to hear a new song. Following this, and people asking to hear a new song, he posted the link for "Disciples". The song was released as a promotional single the next day.

Dates for the Australian leg of the tour were announced on August 23, 2015.

On January 16, 2016, a 2016 tour was announced with dates in North America, South America, and Europe.

On September 24, 2016, Tame Impala was announced as part of the lineup for Laneway Festival 2017, and on January 9, 2017, it was announced that Tame Impala would headline Panorama Festival 2017 alongside Frank Ocean, Solange, Nine Inch Nails, and A Tribe Called Quest.

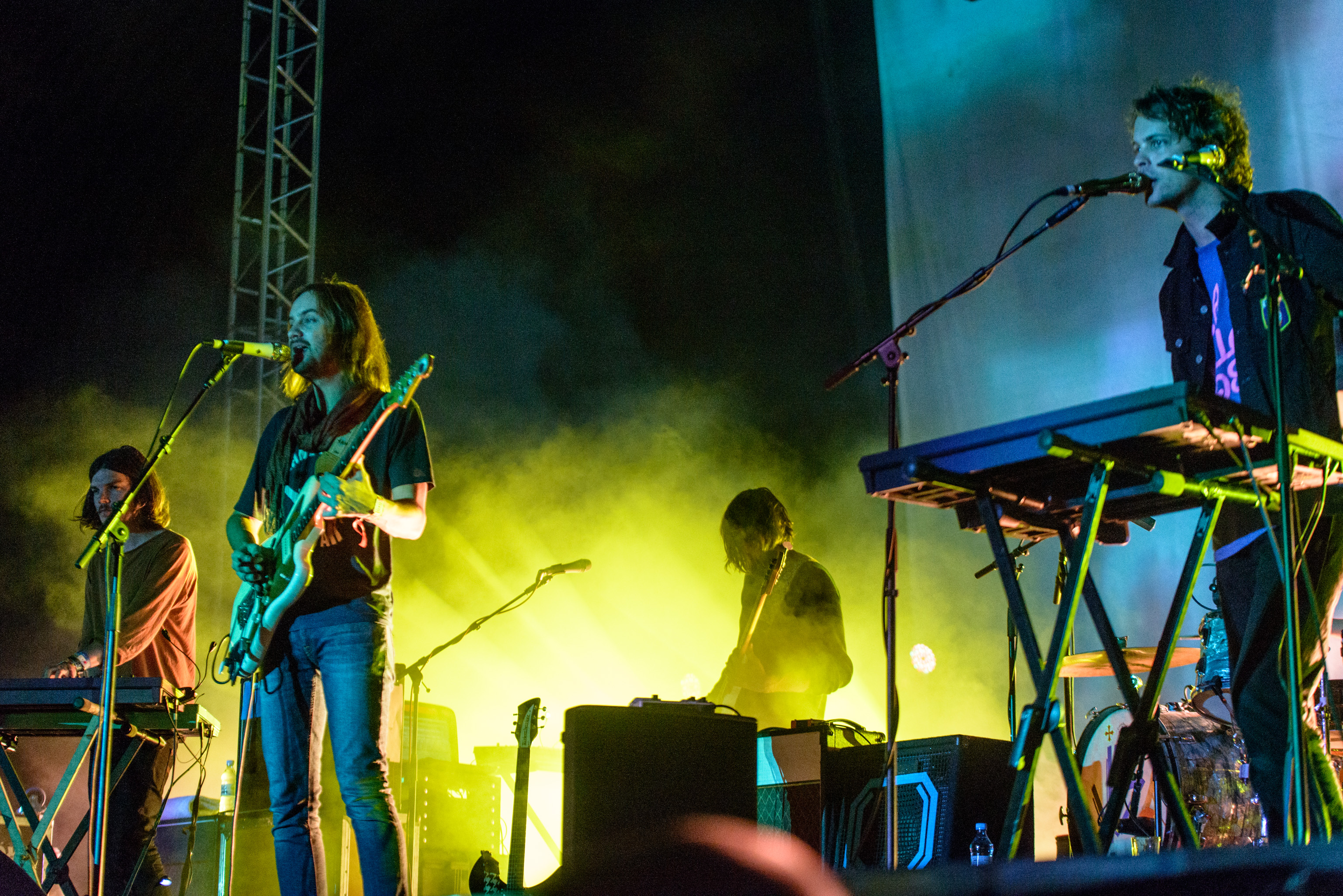
Tame Impala performing at Lollapalooza 2015

== Tour Dates ==
List of 2015 concerts, showing date, city, country, venue, and supporting acts.
Date (2015)	City	Country	Venue	Supporting Acts
April 8	Pomona	United States	Fox Theater	Broncho
April 10 (Note: The show on April 10, 2015 in Indio was part of Coachella 2015 Weekend 1.)	Indio	United States	Empire Polo Club	None
April 17 (Note: The show on April 17, 2015 in Indio was part of Coachella 2015 Weekend 2.)	Indio	United States	Empire Polo Club	None
May 8 (Note: The show on May 8, 2015 in Austin was part of Levitation 2015.)	Austin	United States	Carson Creek Ranch	None
May 9	New Orleans	United States	Civic Theatre	Mini Mansions
May 10 (Note: The show on May 10, 2015 in Georgia was part of Shaky Knees Music Festival 2015.)	Georgia	United States	Central Park	None
May 11	Nashville	United States	Ryman Auditorium	Mini Mansions
May 13	Minneapolis	United States	First Avenue	Mini Mansions
May 14	Milwaukee	United States	Riverside Theater	Mini Mansions
May 15	Chicago	United States	Riviera Theatre	Mini Mansions
May 16	Columbus	United States	Lifestyle Communities Pavilion	Mini Mansions
May 18	Royal Oak	United States	Royal Oak Music Theatre	Mini Mansions
May 19	Toronto	Canada	Massey Hall	Mini Mansions
May 20	Montreal	Canada	Métropolis	Mini Mansions
May 21	Montreal	Canada	Métropolis	Mini Mansions
May 22 (Note: The show on May 22, 2015 in Boston was part of Boston Calling 2015.)	Boston	United States	City Hall Plaza	None
May 25 (Note: The show on May 25, 2015 in Quincy was part of Sasquatch! Music Festival 2015.)	Quincy	United States	The Gorge Amphitheatre	None
May 26	Vancouver	Canada	Malkin Bowl	Kuroma
May 27	Portland	United States	Roseland Theater	Kuroma
May 29	Salt Lake City	United States	The Depot	Kuroma
May 30	Denver	United States	Odgen Theatre	Kuroma
May 31	Kansas City	United States	Uptown Theater	Kuroma
June 1	St. Louis	United States	The Pageant	Kuroma
June 3	Pittsburgh	United States	Stage AE	Kuroma
June 4	Cleveland	United States	House of Blues	Kuroma
June 5 (Note: The show on June 5, 2015 in Cincinnati was part of Bunbury Festival 2015.)	Cincinnati	United States	Sawyer Point Park	None
June 6	Washington, D.C.	United States	Echostage	Kuroma
June 7 (Note: The show on June 7, 2015 in New York City was part of Governors Ball 2015.)	New York City	United States	Randall's Island Park	None
July 26 (Note: The show on July 26, 2015 in Bryon Bay was part of Splendour in the Grass 2015.)	Byron Bay	Australia	North Byron Parklands	None
August 1 (Note: The show on August 1, 2015 in Chicago was part of Lollapalooza 2015.)	Chicago	United States	Grant Park	None
August 4	San Diego	United States	The Observatory North Park	Kirin J. Callinan & Lord Fascinator
August 6	Los Angeles	United States	Hollywood Forever Cemetery	Kirin J. Callinan & Lord Fascinator
August 7	Los Angeles	United States	Hollywood Forever Cemetery	Kirin J. Callinan & Lord Fascinator
August 8 (Note: The show on August 8, 2015 in San Francisco was part of Outside Lands 2015.)	San Francisco	United States	Golden Gate Park	None
August 20 (Note: The show on August 20, 2015 in Paredes de Coura was part of Paredes de Coura Festival 2015.)	Paredes de Coura	Portugal	Praia Fluvial do Taboão	None
August 22 (Note: The show on August 22, 2015 in Hasselt was part of Pukkelpop 2015.)	Hasselt	Belgium	Domein Kiewit	None
August 23 (Note: The show on August 23, 2015 in Biddinghuizen was part of Lowlands 2015.)	Biddinghuizen	Netherlands	Evenemententerrein Walibi Holland	None
August 25 (Note: The show on August 25, 2015 in Sestri Levante was part of Mojotic 2015.)	Sestri Levante	Italy	Ex Convento dell'Annunziata	None
August 26 (Note: The show on August 26, 2015 in Rome was part of Rock in Roma 2015.)	Rome	Italy	Ippodromo delle Capannelle	None
August 28	Verona	Italy	Roman Theatre	Nicholas Allbrook
August 29 (Note: The show on August 29, 2015 in Rümlang was part of Zürich Openair 2015.)	Rümlang	Switzerland	Glattbrug	None
August 30 (Note: The show on August 30, 2015 in Saint-Cloud was part of Rock en Seine 2015.)	Saint-Cloud	France	Domaine national de Saint-Cloud	None
September 1	Berlin	Germany	Kesselhaus	None
September 4 (Note: The show on September 4, 2015 in Salisbury was part of End of the Road Festival 2015.)	Salisbury	United Kingdom	Larmer Tree Gardens	None
September 6 (Note: The show on September 6, 2015 in Stradbally was part of Electric Picnic 2015.)	Stradbally	Ireland	Stradbally Hall	None
September 8	Glasgow	Scotland	Barrowland	None
September 9	Liverpool	United Kingdom	Liverpool Olympia	None
September 11 (Note: The show on September 11, 2015 in Newport was part of Bestival 2015.)	Newport	United Kingdom	Robin Hill Country Park	None
September 13 (Note: The show on September 13, 2015 in Berlin was part of Lollapalooza Berlin 2015.)	Berlin	Germany	Flughafen Tempelhof	None
October 2 (Note: The show on October 2, 2015 in Austin was part of Austin City Limits 2015.)	Austin	United States	Zilker Park	None
October 5	Upper Darby	United States	Tower Theatre	LA Priest
October 6	New York City	United States	Radio City Music Hall	LA Priest
October 7	New York City	United States	Terminal 5	LA Priest
October 9 (Note: The show on October 9, 2015 in Austin was part of Austin City Limits 2015.)	Austin	United States	Zilker Park	None
November 7	Melbourne	Australia	Sidney Myer Music Bowl	Mini Mansions & Koi Child
November 10	Sydney	Australia	Sydney Opera House	Mini Mansions
November 11	Sydney	Australia	Sydney Opera House	Mini Mansions
November 14	Perth	Australia	Belvoir Amphitheatre	Mini Mansions & Koi Child
November 15	Perth	Australia	Belvoir Amphitheatre	Mini Mansions & Koi Child
November 18	Adelaide	Australia	Thebarton Theatre	Mini Mansions
November 19	Adelaide	Australia	Thebarton Theatre	Mini Mansions
November 21	Brisbane	Australia	Riverstage	Mini Mansions & Koi Child
November 24	Auckland	New Zealand	Logan Campbell Centre	Silicon
November 25	Wellington	New Zealand	Shed 6	Silicon

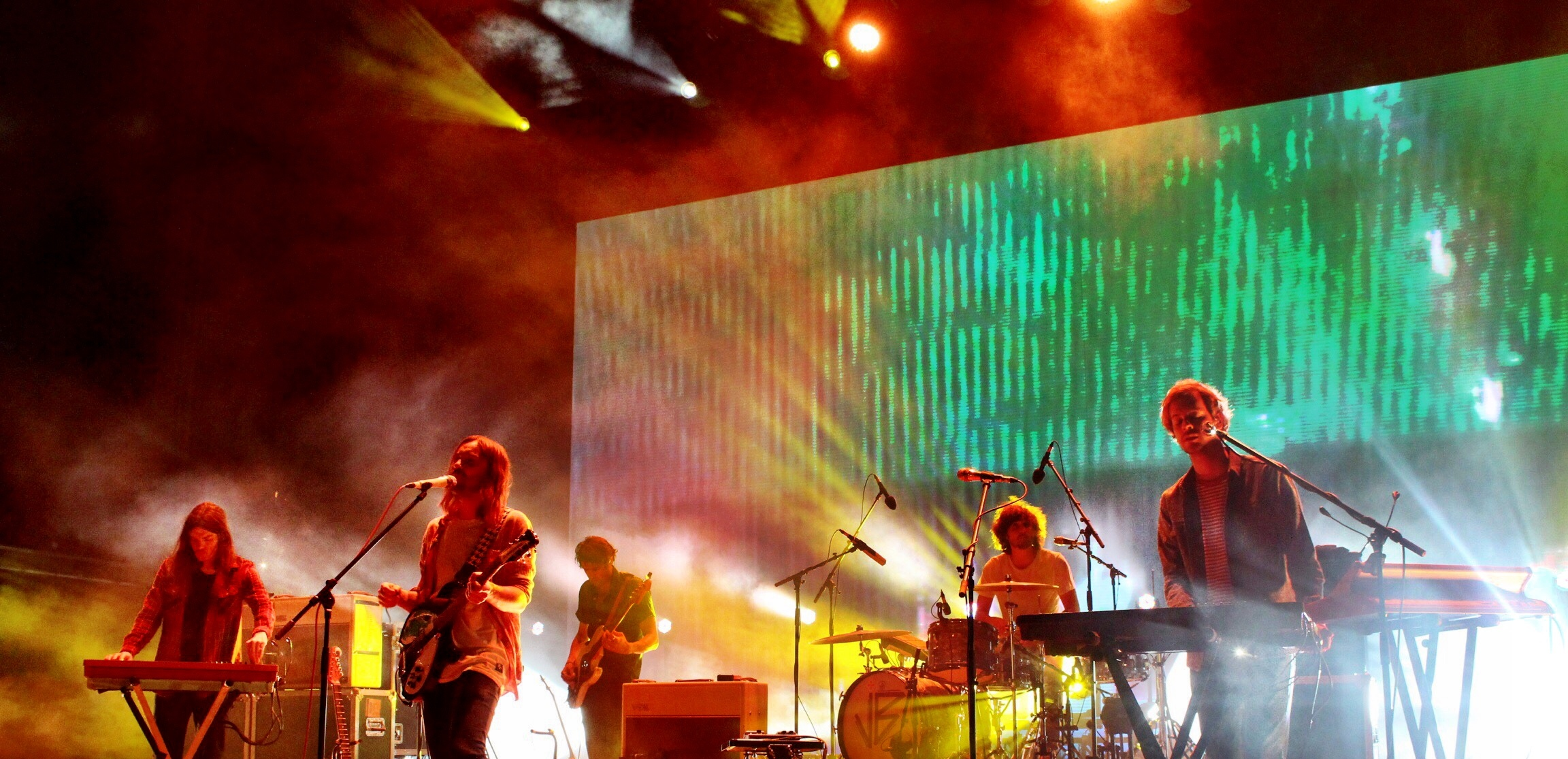
Tame Impala performing at Red Rocks Amphitheatre on August 31, 2016

List of 2016 concerts, showing date, city, country, venue, and supporting acts.
Date (2016)	City	Country	Venue	Supporting Acts
January 29	Amsterdam	Netherlands	Heineken Music Hall	Jagwar Ma
January 30	Forest	Belgium	Forest National	Jagwar Ma
January 31	Paris	France	Le Zénith	Jagwar Ma
February 3	Copenhagen	Denmark	Falconer Salen	Jagwar Ma
February 4	Oslo	Norway	Sentrum Scene	Jagwar Ma
February 5	Stockholm	Sweden	Annext	Jagwar Ma
February 7	Hamburg	Germany	Theater am Großmarkt	Jagwar Ma
February 8	Berlin	Germany	Columbiahalle	Jagwar Ma
February 9	Cologne	Germany	Palladium	Jagwar Ma
February 11	Manchester	United Kingdom	Manchester Arena	Jagwar Ma
February 12	London	United Kingdom	Alexandra Place	Jagwar Ma
February 13	London	United Kingdom	Alexandra Place	Jagwar Ma
March 10 (Note: The show on March 10, 2016 in Bogotá was part of Festival Estéreo Picnic 2016.)	Bogotá	Colombia	Parque Deportivo 222	None
March 12 (Note: The show on March 12, 2016 in São Paulo was part of Lollapalooza Brazil 2016.)	São Paulo	Brazil	Autódromo de Interlagos	None
March 15	Lima	Peru	Gran Parque de la Exposición	Alvvays
March 17	Buenos Aires	Argentina	Teatro Vorterix	Alvvays
March 18 (Note: The show on March 18, 2016 in Buenos Aires was part of Lollapalooza Argentina 2016.)	Buenos Aires	Argentina	Hipódromo de San Isidro	None
March 19 (Note: The show on March 18, 2016 in Santiago was part of Lollapalooza Chile 2016.)	Santiago	Chile	Parque O'Higgins	None
April 19	Hong Kong	China	MacPherson Stadium	None
April 21	Queenstown	Singapore	The Star Theatre	None
April 23	Kuala Lumpur	Malaysia	KL Live	Pastel Lite
April 25	Tokyo	Japan	Zepp Tokyo	None
April 26	Osaka	Japan	Nanba Hatch	None
April 29	Jakarta	Indonesia	Senayan South Parking Lot	Barasuara
May 28 (Note: The show on May 28, 2016 in Kenton was part of BBC Radio 1's Big Weekend 2016.)	Kenton	United Kingdom	Powderham Castle	None
June 2 (Note: The show on June 2, 2016 in Barcelona was part of Primavera Sound 2016.)	Barcelona	Spain	Parc del Fòrum	None
June 4 (Note: The show on June 4, 2016 in Dublin was part of Forbidden Fruit 2016.)	Dublin	Ireland	Royal Hospital Kilmainham	None
June 9	Chicago	United States	UIC Pavilion	Benjamin Booker
June 10 (Note: The show on June 10, 2016 in Manchester was part of Bonnaroo 2016.)	Manchester	United States	Great Stage Park	None
June 11 (Note: The show on June 10, 2016 in Toronto was part of Bestival Toronto 2016.)	Toronto	Canada	Woodbine Park	None
June 12	Montreal	Canada	Bell Centre	Benjamin Booker
June 14 (Note: The show on June 14, 2016 in Brooklyn was part of Celebrate Brooklyn! 2016.)	Brooklyn	United States	Prospect Park Bandshell	None
June 15 (Note: The show on June 15, 2016 in Brooklyn was part of Celebrate Brooklyn! 2016.)	Brooklyn	United States	Prospect Park Bandshell	None
June 16	Columbia	United States	Merriweather Post Pavilion	M83 (Co-headliner)
June 17 (Note: The show on June 17, 2016 in Dover was part of Firefly Music Festival 2016.)	Dover	United States	Dover Motor Speedway	None
June 25 (Note: The show on June 25, 2016 in Pilton was part of Glastonbury Festival 2016.)	Pilton	United Kingdom	Worthy Farm	None
June 29 (Note: The show on June 29, 2016 in Gdynia was part of Open'er Festival 2016.)	Gdynia	Poland	Gdynia-Kosakowo Airport	None
July 1 (Note: The show on July 1, 2016 in Roskilde was part of Roskilde Festival 2016.)	Roskilde	Denmark	Dyrskuepladsen	None
July 2 (Note: The show on July 2, 2016 in Werchter was part of Rock Werchter 2016.)	Werchter	Belgium	Festivalpark	None
July 3 (Note: The show on July 3, 2016 in Belfort was part of Eurockéennes 2016.)	Belfort	France	Malsaucy Peninsula	None
July 4 (Note: The show on July 4, 2016 in Lyon was part of Nuits de Fourvière 2016.)	Lyon	France	Ancient Theatre of Fourvière Roman	None
July 5 (Note: The show on July 5, 2016 in Milan was part of Estathé Market Sound Music Festival 2016.)	Milan	Italy	Mercati Generali	None
July 8 (Note: The show on July 8, 2016 in Lisbon was part of NOS Alive 2016.)	Lisbon	Portugal	Algés Seafront	None
July 9 (Note: The show on July 9, 2016 in Bilbao was part of Bilbao BBK Live 2016.)	Bilbao	Spain	Kobeta Mendi	None
July 11	Rishon LeZion	Israel	Live Park	Jagwar Ma
July 14 (Note: The show on July 14, 2016 in Ostrava was part of Colours of Ostrava 2016.)	Ostrava	Czech Republic	Dolní oblast Vítkovice	None
July 15 (Note: The show on July 15, 2016 in Gräfenhainichen was part of Melt! Festival 2016.)	Gräfenhainichen	Germany	Ferropolis	None
August 27 (Note: The show on August 27, 2016 in Los Angeles was part of FYF Fest 2016.)	Los Angeles	United States	Exposition Park	None
August 28 (Note: The show on August 28, 2016 in Portland was part of Project Pabst 2016.)	Portland	United States	Tom McCall Waterfront Park	None
August 31	Morrison	United States	Red Rocks Amphitheatre	Mac DeMarco
September 2	Berkeley	United States	William Randolph Hearst Greek Theatre	Unknown Mortal Orchestra
September 3	Berkeley	United States	William Randolph Hearst Greek Theatre	Unknown Mortal Orchestra
September 4 (Note: The show on September 4, 2016 in Seattle was part of Bumbershoot 2016.)	Seattle	United States	Memorial Stadium	None
September 8	Mexico City	Mexico	Palacio de los Deportes	CLUBZ
September 10	Monterrey	Mexico	Auditorio Banamex	CLUBZ

List of 2017 concerts, showing date, city, country, venue, and supporting acts.
Date (2017)	City	Country	Venue	Supporting Acts
January 26 (Note: The show on January 26, 2017 in Brisbane was part of Laneway Festival Brisbane 2017.)	Brisbane	Australia	Brisbane Showgrounds	None
January 28 (Note: The show on January 28, 2017 in Melbourne was part of Laneway Festival Melbourne 2017.)	Melbourne	Australia	Footscray Community Arts Centre	None
January 30 (Note: The show on January 30, 2017 in Auckland was part of Laneway Festival Auckland 2017.)	Auckland	New Zealand	Albert Park	None
February 3 (Note: The show on February 3, 2017 in Adelaide was part of Laneway Festival Adelaide 2017.)	Adelaide	Australia	Hart's Mill	None
February 4 (Note: The show on February 4, 2017 in Sydney was part of Laneway Festival Sydney 2017.)	Sydney	Australia	Sydney College of the Arts	None
February 5 (Note: The show on February 5, 2017 in Fremantle was part of Laneway Festival Fremantle 2017.)	Fremantle	Australia	Esplanade Reserve	None
July 27	Port Chester	United States	Capitol Theatre	Lord Fascinator
July 29 (Note: The show on July 29, 2017 in New York City was part of Panorama Music Festival NYC 2017.)	New York City	United States	Randall's Island Park	None

List of 2018 concerts, showing date, city, country, venue, and supporting acts.
Date (2018)	City	Country	Venue	Supporting Acts
July 12 (Note: The show on July 12, 2018 in Madrid was part of Mad Cool Festival 2018.)	Madrid	Spain	IFEMA	None
July 15 (Note: The show on July 15, 2018 in London was part of Citadel Festival 2018.)	London	United Kingdom	Gunnersbury Park	None
July 20 (Note: The show on July 20, 2018 in Chicago was part of Pitchfork Music Festival 2018.)	Chicago	United States	Union Park	None
July 22 (Note: The show on July 22, 2018 in Martindale was part of Float Fest 2018.)	Martindale	United States	Cool River Ranch	None
August 18 (Note: The show on August 18, 2018 in Chiba was part of Summer Sonic Festival Tokyo 2018.)	Chiba	Japan	Makuhari Messe	None
August 19 (Note: The show on August 19, 2018 in Osaka was part of Summer Sonic Festival Osaka 2018.)	Osaka	Japan	Maishima	None
October 12 (Note: The show on October 12, 2018 in Perris was part of Desert Daze 2018.)	Perris	United States	Moreno Beach	None
October 14 (Note: The show on October 14, 2018 in Oakland was part of Treasure Island Music Festival 2018.)	Oakland	United States	Middle Harbor Shoreline Park	None

=== Notes ===
- At the Desert Daze show on October 12, 2018, Tame Impala was only able to play 3 songs before the show was cancelled due to a lightning storm.

== Setlists ==
=== 2015 Setlist ===
This setlist is from the August 7, 2015 concert in Los Angeles. It does not represent all of the concerts for the duration of the tour.

1. "Intro"
2. "Let It Happen"
3. "Mind Mischief" (Note: With Sestri Levante outro.)
4. "Why Won't You Make Up Your Mind?"
5. "Why Won't They Talk to Me?"
6. "It Is Not Meant to Be"
7. "The Moment"
8. "Elephant"
9. "Be Above It" (Note: With extended jam.)
10. "Eventually"
11. "Oscilly"
12. "'Cause I'm a Man"
13. "The Less I Know the Better"
14. "Alter Ego"
15. "Apocalypse Dreams" (Note: With extended outro.)
  Encore
16. "Feels Like We Only Go Backwards"
17. "Nothing That Has Happened So Far Has Been Anything We Could Control"

=== 2016 Setlist ===
This setlist is from the June 17, 2016 concert in Dover. It does not represent all of the concerts for the duration of the tour.

Intro

1. "Nangs"
2. "Let It Happen"
3. "Mind Mischief" (Note: With Sestri Levante outro.)
4. "Why Won't You make Up Your Mind?"
5. "Why Won't They Talk to Me?"
6. "The Moment"
7. "Elephant"
8. "The Less I Know the Better"
9. "Daffodils" (Mark Ronson Cover)
10. "Eventually"
11. "Alter Ego"
12. "Oscilly"
13. "Apocalypse Dreams" (Note: With extended outro.)
14. "Feels Like We Only Go Backwards"
15. "New Person, Same Old Mistakes"

=== 2017-18 Setlist ===
This setlist is from the July 29, 2017 concert in New York City. It does not represent all of the concerts for the duration of the tour.

Intro

1. "Nangs"
2. "Let It Happen"
3. "Sundown Syndrome"
4. "The Moment"
5. "Mind Mischief" (Note: With Sestri Levante outro.)
6. "Why Won't They Talk to Me?"
7. "Elephant"
8. "Why Won't You Make Up Your Mind?"
9. "The Less I Know the Better"
10. "Eventually"
11. "Alter Ego"
12. "Love/Paranoia"
13. "Apocalypse Dreams" (Note: With extended outro.)
  Encore
14. "Feels Like We Only Go Backwards"
15. "New Person, Same Old Mistakes"

== Live Band ==
- Kevin Parker – lead vocals, guitar
- Dominic Simper – guitar, synthesiser, keyboards (2010–present)
- Jay Watson – synthesiser, keyboards, guitar, backing vocals
- Julien Barbagallo – drums, percussion, backing vocals
- Cam Avery – bass guitar, synthesiser, backing vocals

== Accolades ==
In 2016, the Australian leg of the Currents Tour was nominated at the ARIA Awards for Best Australian Live Act.
