= Lonerism Tour =

2012-14 concert tour by Tame Impala

- Tour by Tame Impala
- Promotional poster for European tour dates in 2013
- Location: North America; Latin America; Europe; Asia; Oceania
- Associated album: Lonerism
- Start date: July 28, 2012
- End date: November 28, 2014
- No. of shows: 181
- Supporting acts: Young Magic; Audac; The Ganjas; Föllakzoid; D.I.E.T.R.I.C.H.; Dead Man's Eyes; The Amazing; Wisdom; Young Dreams; The Growl; Midnight Juggernauts; Jonathan Wilson; Lord Fascinator; Light Heat; Melody's Echo Chamber; Foxygen; Temples; The Ghost of a Saber Tooth Tiger; White Denim; The National; Boogarins; Morbo y Mambo; Yesco; Rey Fresco; D.D Dumbo; Delicate Steve; Never Shout Never

Tame Impala concert chronology
- Innerspeaker Tour (2010–11); Lonerism Tour (2012–14); Currents Tour (2015–18)

The Lonerism Tour was a concert tour by Tame Impala, the Australian psychedelic music project of Kevin Parker, in support of their second studio album Lonerism. It began on July 28, 2012, at the Splendour in the Grass in Byron Bay and concluded on November 28, 2014 at Popload Festival in São Paulo. Young Magic, Audac, The Ganjas, Föllakzoid, D.I.E.T.R.I.C.H., Dead Man's Eyes, The Amazing, Wisdom, Young Dreams, The Growl, Midnight Juggernauts, Jonathan Wilson, Lord Fascinator, Light Heat, Melody's Echo Chamber, Foxygen, Temples, The Ghost of a Saber Tooth Tiger, White Denim, The National, Boogarins, Morbo y Mambo, Yesco, Rey Fresco, D.D Dumbo, Delicate Steve, and Never Shout Never performed as the supporting acts.

== Background ==
About a year after finishing the Innerspeaker Tour in 2011, announced the project's upcoming album Lonerism on July 5, 2012. The announcement was followed by the release of the promo single "Apocalypse Dreams" on July 8, 2012.

A few weeks later on July 26, 2012, the project released the song "Elephant" making it the lead single for the album

Less than a month after releasing "Elephant", Tame Impala would announce a world tour in support of Lonerism with dates slated for fall of 2012.

The second single, "Feels Like We Only Go Backwards", was released on October 1, 2012 and Lonerism was officially released on October 5, 2012 to widespread critical acclaim from fans and music critics.

On November 26, 2012, Tame Impala announced a dates for a North American leg of the tour slated for early 2013.

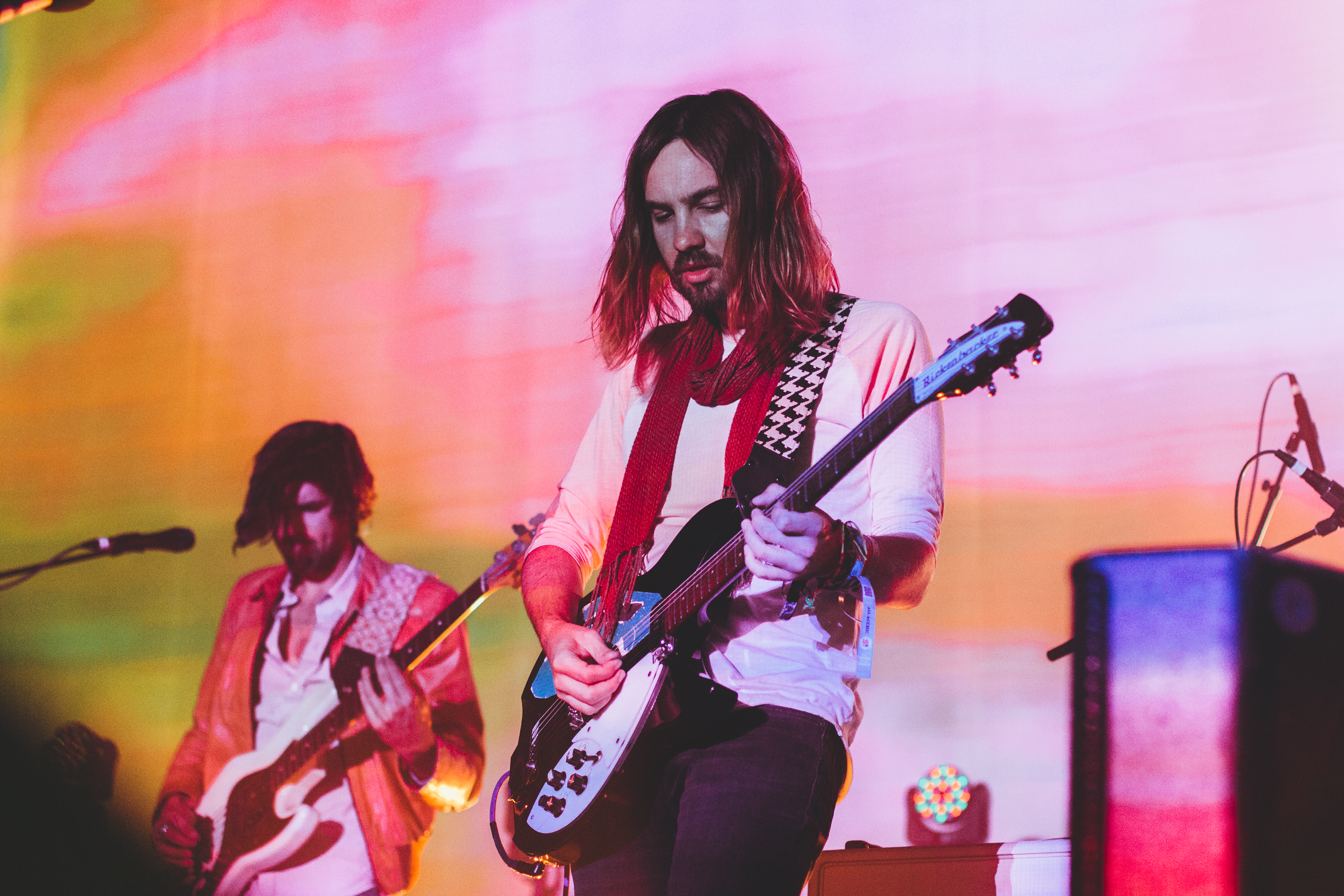
Tame Impala members Kevin Parker (right), and Cam Avery (left) performing in 2014

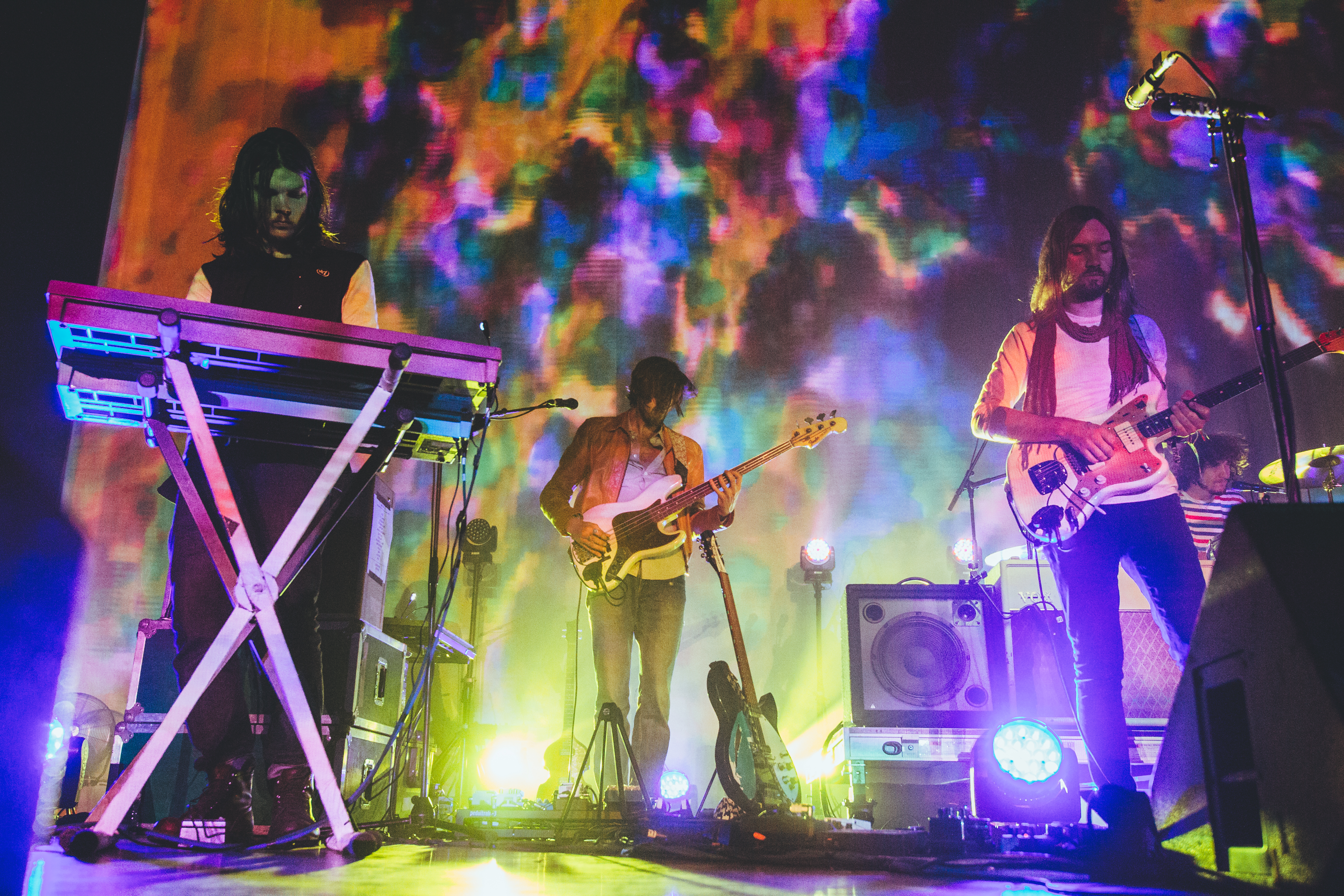
From left to right: Dominic Simper, Cam Avery, and Kevin Parker of Tame Impala performing in 2014

On January 26, 2013, "Mind Mischief" was released as the third and final single for the album. On that same day, Tame Impala performed their first concert of 2013 in Singapore.

== Tour Dates ==
List of 2012 concerts, showing date, city, country, venue, and supporting acts.
Date (2012)	City	Country	Venue	Supporting Acts
July 28 (Note: The show on July 28, 2012 in Byron Bay was part of Splendour in the Grass 2012.)	Byron Bay	Australia	Belongil Fields	None
August 3 (Note: The show on August 3, 2012 in Chicago was part of Lollapalooza 2012.)	Chicago	United States	Grant Park	None
August 5 (Note: The show on August 5, 2012 in Montreal was part of Osheaga Festival 2012.)	Montreal	Canada	Parc Jean-Drapeau	None
August 7	Brooklyn	United States	Music Hall of Williamsburg	Young Magic
August 11 (Note: The show on August 11, 2012 in San Francisco was part of Outside Lands 2012.)	San Francisco	United States	Golden Gate Park	None
August 14	São Paulo	Brazil	Cine Joia	Audac
August 15	São Paulo	Brazil	Cine Joia	Audac
August 16	Rio de Janeiro	Brazil	Imperator	Audac
August 17	Santiago	Chile	Chimkowe	The Ganjas & Föllakzoid
August 18	Buenos Aires	Argentina	Niceto Club	D.I.E.T.R.I.C.H.
August 19	Buenos Aires	Argentina	Niceto Club	D.I.E.T.R.I.C.H.
September 29 (Note: The show on September 29, 2012 in Brisbane was part of Parklife Festival Brisbane 2012.)	Brisbane	Australia	Riverstage	None
September 30 (Note: The show on September 30, 2012 in Sydney was part of Parklife Festival Sydney 2012.)	Sydney	Australia	Centennial Park	None
October 6 (Note: The show on October 6, 2012 in Melbourne was part of Parklife Festival Melbourne 2012.)	Melbourne	Australia	Sidney Myer Music Bowl	None
October 7 (Note: The show on October 7, 2012 in Adelaide was part of Parklife Festival Adelaide 2012.)	Adelaide	Australia	Botanic Park	None
October 14	Cologne	Germany	Gebäude 9	Dead Man's Eyes
October 15	Paris	France	Le Bataclan	Dead Man's Eyes
October 16	Brussels	Belgium	Ancienne Belgique	Dead Man's Eyes
October 17	Hamburg	Germany	Gruenspan	Dead Man's Eyes
October 19	Oslo	Norway	Rockefeller Music Hall	The Amazing & Wisdom
October 20	Stockholm	Sweden	Debaser Medis	The Amazing & Wisdom
October 21	Gothenburg	Sweden	Pustervik	Young Dreams
October 22	Copenhagen	Denmark	Vega	Young Dreams
October 23	Berlin	Germany	Postbahnhof	Young Dreams
October 25	Vienna	Austria	Flucc	Young Dreams
October 26	Milan	Italy	Magazzini Generali	Young Dreams
October 27	Lausanne	Switzerland	Les Docks	Young Dreams
October 29	Amsterdam	Netherlands	Paradiso	Young Dreams
October 30	London	United Kingdom	O2 Academy Brixton	Young Dreams
November 1	Manchester	United Kingdom	HMV Ritz	Young Dreams
November 2	Sheffield	United Kingdom	The Leadmill	Young Dreams
November 3	Glasgow	Scotland	O2 ABC	Young Dreams
November 7	Brooklyn	United States	Music Hall of Williamsburg	The Amazing
November 8	Philadelphia	United States	Union Transfer	The Amazing
November 9	Boston	United States	Royale	The Amazing
November 10	New York City	United States	Webster Hall	The Amazing
November 12	Toronto	Canada	Phoenix Concert Theatre	The Amazing
November 13	Chicago	United States	Metro	The Amazing
November 15	San Francisco	United States	The Fillmore	The Amazing
November 16	Los Angeles	United States	The Fonda Theatre	The Amazing
November 17	Los Angeles	United States	The Fonda Theatre	The Amazing
December 5	Melbourne	Australia	The Forum Theatre	The Growl
December 6	Melbourne	Australia	The Forum Theatre	The Growl
December 7 (Note: The show on December 7, 2012 in Meredith was part of Meredith Music Festival 2012.)	Meredith	Australia	Meredith Supernatural Amphitheatre	None
December 8 (Note: The show on December 8, 2012 in Sydney was part of Homebake Sydney 2012.)	Sydney	Australia	The Domain	None
December 11	Adelaide	Australia	HQ Complex	The Growl
December 12	Brisbane	Australia	The Tivoli	The Growl
December 13	Sydney	Australia	Enmore Theatre	The Growl
December 14	Sydney	Australia	Enmore Theatre	The Growl
December 15	Fremantle	Australia	Fremantle Arts Centre	The Growl
December 31 (Note: The show on December 31, 2012 in Phillip Island was part of Pyramid Rock Festival 2012.)	Phillip Island	Australia	Phillip Island Nature Park	None

List of 2013 concerts, showing date, city, country, venue, and supporting acts.
Date (2013)	City	Country	Venue	Supporting Acts
January 26 (Note: The show on January 26, 2013 in Singapore was part of Laneway Festival Singapore 2013.)	Singapore		The Meadow	None
January 28 (Note: The show on January 28, 2013 in Auckland was part of Laneway Festival Auckland 2013.)	Auckland	New Zealand	Silo Park	None
February 19	New York City	United States	Terminal 5	The Growl
February 20	Washington, D.C.	United States	9:30 Club	The Growl
February 21	Carrboro	United States	Cat's Cradle	The Growl
February 22	Asheville	United States	The Orange Peel	The Growl
February 23	Athens	United States	Georgia Theatre	The Growl
February 25	Houston	United States	Fitzgerald's Upstairs	The Growl
February 26	Austin	United States	Stubb's Bar-B-Q	The Growl
February 27	Dallas	United States	Granada Theater	The Growl
February 28	Tulsa	United States	Cain's Ballroom	The Growl
March 2	Louisville	United States	Headliners Music Hall	The Growl
March 3	Milwaukee	United States	Turner Hall Ballroom	The Growl
March 4	Minneapolis	United States	First Avenue	The Growl
March 6	Chicago	United States	Vic Theatre	The Growl
March 7	Detroit	United States	Saint Andrew's Hall	The Growl
March 8	Columbus	United States	Newport Music Hall	The Growl
March 9	Toronto	Canada	Kool Haus	The Growl
March 11	Montreal	Canada	Métropolis	The Growl
March 12	Boston	United States	House of Blues	The Growl
March 15	Zapopan	Mexico	Teatro Estudio Cavaret	None
March 16 (Note: The show on March 16, 2013 in Mexico City was part of Vive Latino 2013.)	Mexico City	Mexico	Foro Sol	None
April 14 (Note: The show on April 14, 2013 in Indio was part of Coachella 2013 Weekend 1.)	Indio	United States	Empire Polo Club	None
April 21 (Note: The show on April 21, 2013 in Indio was part of Coachella 2013 Weekend 2.)	Indio	United States	Empire Polo Club	None
April 26	Melbourne	Australia	Festival Hall	Midnight Juggernauts
April 27 (Note: The show on April 27, 2013 in Maitland was part of Groovin' the Moo Maitland 2013.)	Maitland	Australia	Maitland Showground	None
April 28 (Note: The show on April 28, 2013 in Canberra was part of Groovin' the Moo Canberra 2013.)	Canberra	Australia	The Meadows	None
May 2	Sydney	Australia	Hordern Pavilion	Midnight Juggernauts
May 4 (Note: The show on May 4, 2013 in Bendigo was part of Groovin' the Moo Bendigo 2013.)	Bendigo	Australia	Prince of Wales Showgrounds	None
May 5 (Note: The show on May 4, 2013 in Townsville was part of Groovin' the Moo Townsville 2013.)	Townsville	Australia	Murray Sports Complex	None
May 8	Brisbane	Australia	Brisbane Convention Centre	Midnight Juggernauts
May 9	Adelaide	Australia	Thebarton Theatre	Midnight Juggernauts
May 11 (Note: The show on May 11, 2013 in Bunbury was part of Groovin' the Moo Bunbury 2013.)	Bunbury	Australia	Hay Park	None
May 18	Perth	Australia	Belvoir Amphitheatre	None
May 23 (Note: The show on May 11, 2013 in Barcelona was part of Primavera Sound 2013.)	Barcelona	Spain	Parc del Fòrum	None
May 25 (Note: The show on May 25, 2013 in Quincy was part of Sasquatch! Music Festival 2013.)	Quincy	United States	The Gorge Amphitheatre	None
May 26	Portland	United States	Crystal Ballroom	Jonathan Wilson
May 27	Vancouver	Canada	Commodore Ballroom	Jonathan Wilson
May 29	Oakland	United States	Fox Theater	Jonathan Wilson
May 31	San Diego	United States	House of Blues	Jonathan Wilson
June 16 (Note: The show on June 16, 2013 in Manchester was part of Bonnaroo 2013.)	Manchester	United States	Great Stage Park	None
June 17	Atlanta	United States	Tabernacle	None
June 18	Richmond	United States	The National	Lord Fascinator
June 19	Philadelphia	United States	Electric Factory	Light Heat
June 22 (Note: The show on June 22, 2013 in Neuhausen ob Eck was part of Southside Festival 2013.)	Neuhausen ob Eck	Germany	Neuhausen ob Eck Airfield	None
June 25	London	United Kingdom	Hammersmith Apollo	Melody's Echo Chamber
June 26	Paris	France	L'Olympia	Melody's Echo Chamber
June 28 (Note: The show on June 28, 2013 in Pilton was part of Glastonbury Festival 2013.)	Pilton	United Kingdom	Worthy Farm	None
June 30 (Note: The show on June 30, 2013 in Roeser was part of Rock-A-Field 2013.)	Roeser	Luxembourg	Herchesfeld	None
July 1	Cologne	Germany	Gloria Theater	Melody's Echo Chamber
July 3	Berlin	Germany	Astra Kulturhaus	Melody's Echo Chamber
July 4 (Note: The show on July 4, 2013 in Gdynia was part of Open'er Festival 2013.)	Gdynia	Poland	Gdynia-Kosakowo Airport	None
July 6 (Note: The show on July 6, 2013 in Werchter was part of Rock Werchter 2013.)	Werchter	Belgium	Festivalpark	None
July 7 (Note: The show on July 7, 2013 in Belfort was part of Eurockéennes 2013.)	Belfort	France	Malsaucy Peninsula	None
July 9 (Note: The show on July 9, 2013 in Ravenna was part of Ravenna Festival 2013.)	Ravenna	Italy	Rocca Brancaleone	None
July 10	Segrate	Italy	Circolo Magnolia	Melody's Echo Chamber
July 11	Ramonville-Saint-Agne	France	Le Bikini	Melody's Echo Chamber
July 13	Madrid	Spain	La Riviera	Melody's Echo Chamber
July 14 (Note: The show on July 14, 2013 in Lisbon was part of Optimus Alive 2013.)	Lisbon	Portugal	Passeio Marítimo de Algés	None
July 26 (Note: The show on July 26, 2013 in Yuzawa was part of Fuji Rock Festival 2013.)	Yuzawa	Japan	Naeba Ski Resort	None
August 7 (Note: The show on August 7, 2013 in Oslo was part of Øyafestivalen 2013.)	Oslo	Norway	Middelalderparken	None
August 8 (Note: The show on August 8, 2013 in Gothenburg was part of Way Out West 2013.)	Gothenburg	Sweden	Slottsskogen	None
August 9	Copenhagen	Denmark	Vega	Foxygen
August 11 (Note: The show on August 11, 2013 in Budapest was part of Sziget Festival 2013.)	Budapest	Hungary	Óbudai-Sziget	None
August 12	Ljubljana	Slovenia	Kino Šiška	None
August 13 (Note: The show on August 13, 2013 in Sestri Levante was part of Mojotic 2013.)	Sestri Levante	Italy	Ex Convento dell'Annunziata	None
August 14	Zurich	Switzerland	Komplex 457	Foxygen
August 16 (Note: The show on August 16, 2013 in Biddinghuizen was part of Lowlands Festival 2013.)	Biddinghuizen	Netherlands	Evenemententerrein Walibi Holland	None
August 17 (Note: The show on August 17, 2013 in Saint-Père was part of La Route du Rock 2013.)	Saint-Père	France	Fort de Saint-Père	None
August 20	Edinburgh	Scotland	HMV Picture House	Temples
August 21	Dublin	Ireland	Olympia Theatre	Temples
August 23 (Note: The show on August 23, 2013 in Saint-Cloud was part of Rock en Seine 2013.)	Saint-Cloud	France	Parc de Saint-Cloud	None
August 24 (Note: The show on August 24, 2013 in Reading was part of Reading Festival 2013.)	Reading	United Kingdom	Little John's Farm	None
August 25 (Note: The show on August 25, 2013 in Bramham was part of Leeds Festival 2013.)	Bramham	United Kingdom	Bramham Park	None
September 30	Boston	United States	Agganis Arena	The Ghost of a Saber Tooth Tiger
October 1	New York City	United States	Terminal 5	The Ghost of a Saber Tooth Tiger
October 2	New York City	United States	Terminal 5	The Ghost of a Saber Tooth Tiger
October 3	Philadelphia	United States	Festival Pier at Penn's Landing	The Ghost of a Saber Tooth Tiger
October 4	Columbia	United States	Merriweather Post Pavilion	The Ghost of a Saber Tooth Tiger
October 6 (Note: The show on October 6, 2013 in Austin was part of Austin City Limits 2013.)	Austin	United States	Zilker Park	None
October 8	St. Louis	United States	The Pageant	White Denim
October 9	Madison	United States	Orpheum Theatre	White Denim
October 10	Chicago	United States	Riviera Theatre	White Denim
October 11	Kansas City	United States	Starlight Theater	The National
October 12	Dallas	United States	South Side Ballroom	The National
October 16	São Paulo	Brazil	Cine Joia	Boogarins
October 17	Rio de Janeiro	Brazil	Circo Voador	Boogarins
October 19	Santiago	Chile	Chimkowe	None
October 21	Buenos Aires	Argentina	Teatro Vorterix	Morbo y Mambo
October 22	Buenos Aires	Argentina	Teatro Vorterix	Morbo y Mambo
October 24	Mexico City	Mexico	José Cuervo Salón	Yesco
October 26	Boulder	United States	Boulder Theater	White Denim
October 27	Denver	United States	Ogden Theatre	White Denim
October 28	Los Angeles	United States	Hollywood Roosevelt Hotel	White Denim
October 29	Los Angeles	United States	Greek Theatre	White Denim
October 30	Los Angeles	United States	The Belasco	White Denim
October 31	San Francisco	United States	Bill Graham Civic Auditorium	White Denim
November 1	Santa Barbara	United States	Santa Barbara Bowl	Rey Fresco
November 4	Portland	United States	Crystal Ballroom	None

List of 2014 concerts, showing date, city, country, venue, and supporting acts.
Date (2014)	City	Country	Venue	Supporting Acts
January 17 (Note: The show on January 17, 2014 in Auckland was part of Big Day Out Auckland 2014.)	Auckland	New Zealand	Western Springs Stadium	None
January 19 (Note: The show on January 19, 2014 in Gold Coast was part of Big Day Out Gold Coast 2014.)	Gold Coast	Australia	Metricon Stadium	None
January 24 (Note: The show on January 24, 2014 in Melbourne was part of Big Day Out Melbourne 2014.)	Melbourne	Australia	Flemington Racecourse	None
January 26 (Note: The show on January 26, 2014 in Sydney was part of Big Day Out Sydney 2014.)	Sydney	Australia	Sydney Showground	None
January 31 (Note: The show on January 31, 2014 in Adelaide was part of Big Day Out Adelaide 2014.)	Adelaide	Australia	Bonython Park	None
February 2 (Note: The show on February 2, 2014 in Perth was part of Big Day Out Perth 2014.)	Perth	Australia	Arena Joondalup	None
May 22	Oxford	United Kingdom	O2 Academy Oxford	None
May 23	London	United Kingdom	Finsbury Park	None
May 24	London	United Kingdom	Finsbury Park	None
July 6 (Note: The show on July 6, 2014 in Turku was part of Ruisrock Festival 2014.)	Turku	Finland	Ruissalo	None
July 8	Frankfurt	Germany	Batschkapp	None
July 9	Munich	Germany	Theaterfabrik	None
July 10 (Note: The show on July 10, 2014 in Trenčín was part of Pohoda 2014.)	Trenčín	Slovakia	Letisko	None
July 12	Manchester	United Kingdom	Albert Hall	D.D Dumbo
July 13 (Note: The show on July 10, 2014 in Kinross was part of T in the Park 2014.)	Kinross	Scotland	Balado	None
July 14	Birmingham	United Kingdom	The Institute	D.D Dumbo
July 15	Nottingham	United Kingdom	Rock City	D.D Dumbo
July 17 (Note: The show on July 17, 2014 in Sesimbra was part of Super Bock Super Rock 2014.)	Sesimbra	Portugal	Meco Beach	None
July 18 (Note: The show on July 18, 2014 in Benicàssim was part of Benicàssim 2014.)	Benicàssim	Spain	Recinto de Festivales de Benicàssim	None
July 20 (Note: The show on July 20, 2014 in Henham was part of Latitude Festival 2014.)	Henham	United Kingdom	Henham Park	None
November 9	New York City	United States	Beacon Theatre	Delicate Steve
November 10	New York City	United States	Beacon Theatre	Delicate Steve
November 12	Los Angeles	United States	Shrine Auditorium	Delicate Steve
November 13	Las Vegas	United States	Brooklyn Bowl	Delicate Steve
November 15	Oakland	United States	Fox Theater	Delicate Steve
November 16	Oakland	United States	Fox Theater	Delicate Steve
November 20 (Note: The show on November 20, 2014 in Bogotá was part of SOMA 2014.)	Bogotá	Colombia	Royal Center	None
November 22 (Note: The show on November 22, 2014 in Santiago was part of Fauna Primavera 2014.)	Santiago	Chile	Espacio Broadway	None
November 24 (Note: The show on November 24, 2014 in Buenos Aires was part of Music Wins! Festival 2014.)	Buenos Aires	Argentina	Mandarine Park	None
November 26	Rio de Janeiro	Brazil	Circo Voador	Never Shout Never
November 28 (Note: The show on November 24, 2014 in São Paulo was part of Popload Festival 2014.)	São Paulo	Brazil	Audio	None

Desert Daze 2022 poster promoting the performance of Lonerism in its entirety

=== 10th Anniversary Performance ===
For the 10th Anniversary of Lonerism, Tame Impala performed the album in its entirety at Desert Daze on October 1, 2022. This performance would mark the live debut of a few songs, and the first time that some songs had been played in years. Exclusive merch commemorating the anniversary was sold at the event.

==== Notes ====
- The shows on September 30 and October 1-4, 2013 were part of a co-headlining tour with The Flaming Lips.
- The show on October 10, 2013 in Chicago was recorded and put onto Tame Impala's live album, Live Versions.
- The shows on October 28-31, 2013 and November 1, 2013 were part of a co-headlining tour with The Flaming Lips.
- The shows on May 23 and 24, 2014 in Finsbury Park were in support of Arctic Monkeys alongside Royal Blood and Miles Kane.

== Setlist ==
This setlist is from the October 10, 2013 concert in Chicago. It does not represent all of the concerts for the duration of the tour.

1. "Endors Toi"
2. "Solitude Is Bliss"
3. "Sestri Levante"
4. "Alter Ego"
5. "Music to Walk Home By"
6. "Why Won't They Talk to Me?"
7. "Desire Be Desire Go"
8. "Half Full Glass of Wine"
9. "Why Won't You Make Up Your Mind?"
10. "Elephant"
11. "Be Above It"
12. "Oscilly"
13. "Mind Mischief"
14. "Apocalypse Dreams"
  Encore
15. "Feels Like We Only Go Backwards"
16. "Nothing That Has Happened So Far Has Been Anything We Could Control"

== Live Band ==
- Kevin Parker – lead vocals, guitar
- Dominic Simper – bass guitar, guitar, synthesizer, keyboards
- Nick Allbrook – bass guitar, guitar
- Jay Watson – drums, synthesizer, keyboards, guitar, backing vocals
- Julien Barbagallo – drums, percussion, backing vocals
- Cam Avery – bass guitar, synthesizer, backing vocals

=== Notes ===
- Nick Allbrook left the band after their performance at the Belvoir Amphitheatre in May of 2013. He explained his departure as a matter of time management. Allbrook would be replaced by fellow Pond bandmate Cam Avery.

== Accolades ==
In 2013, the Lonerism Tour was nominated for an ARIA Award for Best Australian Live Act. The next year, the project's performance at Big Day Out in 2014 was nominated for an ARIA Award for Best Australian Live Act.
