= Special Cases (disambiguation) =

"Special Cases" is a song by Massive Attack.

Special Cases may also refer to:

- Special Cases (band), Chilean rock band
  - Special Cases (album), 2020 album by the band

== See also ==
- Special case
