= Special Cases (album) =

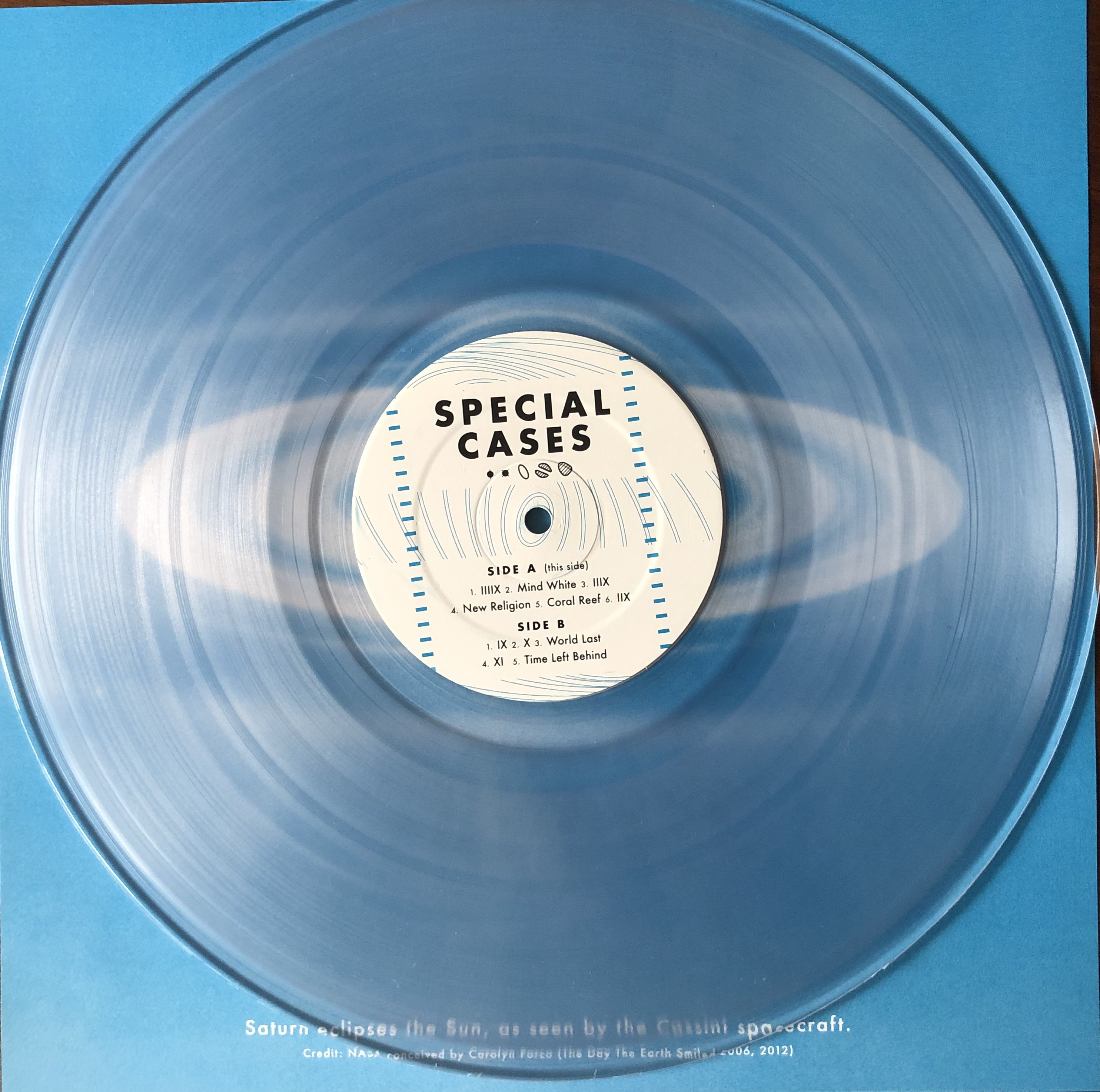

Studio album by Special Cases
- Released: 29 February 2020
- Genre: alternative rock; ambient; electronic; experimental; indie rock; instrumental; instrumental rock; neo psychedelia; psychedelic rock; psychedelia; space; space rock
- Length: 41 minutes
- Label: Weisskalt, Blow Your Mind and ETCS Records

The eponymously titled Special Cases is the first studio album by Chilean psychedelic rock band Special Cases.

== Background ==
The album was written between 2011 and 2012 with recording from 2012 to 2013 by musician and Föllakzoid founder Juan Pablo Rodríguez as a solo project to further explore synthesizers and space as an aesthetic and concept.

The gear used for the making of the record included a Roland JD800 (synthesizer), Roland SPX404 (sampler) and Samick guitar.

It was released on cassette tape by ETCS Records in 2014, later reissued on transparent vinyl by Weisskalt Records in 2020 by longstanding Australian manufacturer Zenith as a limited edition of 300. The record was pressed at 33 rpm on 180-gram wax with a 12-inch printed insert of Saturn eclipsing the Sun as seen by the Cassini spacecraft and conceived by Carolyn Porco (NASA).

Both releases feature the art design of Chilean visual artist and musician Tomás Olivos. It is also the sole fully instrumental album by Special Cases that is not played live by the band.

== Critical reception ==
After its initial 2014 cassette tape release by ETCS Records, the debut album of Special Cases accrued an underground cult audience. In 2020 when the album was pressed on vinyl by Weisskalt, it received critical acclaim with respected publications such as The Quietus highlighting the relevance of Rodríguez's songwriting and performance in contemporary cosmic and psychedelic music alongside his contributions to the legacy building of Föllakzoid. In Brian Coney's words, "As a whole, though, Special Cases spills over with low-key majesty and purpose. From the vantage point of the future where his band have cornered a niche within modern psychedelia, it evinces JPR as a rare shaman of kosmiche savvy."

The album was also reviewed by Stephen Lawrie of The Telescopes who considered the music to be like, "a one man rave on a lone trip to beyond, returning from his voyage to the here and now with a body of work reaching celestial highs from the coral below."

The vinyl itself was warmly received and brought a new dimension to listening to the music as the medium properly represented the expansiveness of the sound and its expression of space. Round and Round Records described the release as "beautifully hypnotic and yet eclectic in its scope, it encompasses synth ripples, jamming space rock and an almost minimal techno vibe throughout."

The record was also particularly popular with ongoing listeners of neo psychedelia and space rock, with The Devil's Lexicon's Dave Lang praising the music and vinyl manufacturing, "it has elements of metronomic krautrock mixed with fuzzy shoegaze, minimal technoid pulses and even widescreen festival space-rock of the F/i/Hawkwind variety, and while these may all be well-worn musical tropes in the here and now, the execution, track syncing, packaging and overall presentation of the material is note-perfect."

== Track listing ==
All music written and performed by Juan Pablo Rodríguez.

Special Cases track listing
No.	Title	Length
1.	"IIIIX"	1:37
2.	"Mind White"	5:15
3.	"IIIX"	0:23
4.	"New Religion"	6:33
5.	"Coral Reef"	6:23
6.	"IIX"	1:25
7.	"IX"	1:57
8.	"Trapped in Space"	2:59
9.	"World Last"	7:01
10.	"XI"	0:28
11.	"Voyage"	7:00

== Credits ==
Recording and mixing by J.P.R.G. during 2012–2013 at BYM Records. Mastering: BYM Records.
