= Freddy Keiaho =

Fijian gridiron football player (born 1982)

No. 54
- Position: Linebacker

Personal information
- Born: December 18, 1982 (age 43); Suva, Fiji
- Listed height: 5 ft 11 in (1.80 m)
- Listed weight: 226 lb (103 kg)

Career information
- High school: Buena (Ventura, California, U.S.)
- College: San Diego State
- NFL draft: 2006: 3rd round, 94th overall pick

Career history
- Indianapolis Colts (2006–2009); Jacksonville Jaguars (2010)

Awards and highlights
- Super Bowl champion (XLI); First-team All-MW (2005)

Career NFL statistics
- Total tackles: 249
- Sacks: 1.5
- Forced fumbles: 2
- Fumble recoveries: 5
- Interceptions: 1
- Stats at Pro Football Reference

Freddy Keiaho (born Naivote Taulawakeiaho; December 18, 1982) is a Fijian former professional player of American football who was a linebacker in the National Football League (NFL). He played college football for the San Diego State Aztecs, and was selected by the Indianapolis Colts in the third round of the 2006 NFL draft. He was a part of the Colts' Super Bowl XLI victory against the Chicago Bears. He joined the Jacksonville Jaguars in the 2010 season.

== Early life and college ==
Keiaho was born Naivote Taulawakeiaho in Suva, Fiji. He grew up in Ventura, California and played high school football for Buena High School, where he was a star athlete. Freddy's older brother, George, was a star running back at Buena High School, rushing for 6,615 yards from 1990 to 1993 before accepting a scholarship to Washington and later attending California Lutheran University. His other older brother, Roger Keiaho, is the lead singer of the rock band Rey Fresco.

Keiaho attended San Diego State University, where he played for the San Diego State Aztecs football team.

== Professional career ==
Pre-draft measurables
Height	Weight	Arm length	Hand span	40-yard dash	20-yard shuttle	Three-cone drill	Vertical jump	Broad jump	Bench press
5 ft 11 1/4 in (1.81 m)	224 lb (102 kg)	31 in (0.79 m)	9 3/8 in (0.24 m)	4.68 s	4.12 s	7.01 s	36.0 in (0.91 m)	9 ft 5 in (2.87 m)	15 reps
All values from NFL Combine/Pro Day

=== Indianapolis Colts ===
Keiaho was selected into the National Football League in 2006, being picked up by the Indianapolis Colts in the third round of the 2006 NFL draft with the 94th overall pick. As such he became the first Fijian ever drafted into the NFL. In his rookie season, the Colts defeated the Chicago Bears in Super Bowl XLI, making Keiaho a Super Bowl champion. He played with the Colts for four seasons, 2006–2009.

=== Jacksonville Jaguars ===
On April 30, 2010, Keiaho signed with the Jacksonville Jaguars. After spending most of the 2010 season on injured reserve, he was released with an injury settlement in December 2010.
