= Palo =

Palo may refer to:

== Places ==
- Palo, Estonia, village in Meremäe Parish, Võru County, Estonia
- Palo, Huesca, municipality in the province of Huesca, Spain
- Palo, Iowa, United States, a town located within Linn County
- Palo Laziale, a location in the comune of Ladispoli, Lazio, Italy
- Palo, Leyte, a 3rd class municipality in Philippines
- Palo, Minnesota, United States, a community located in St. Louis County, between Makinen and Aurora, Minnesota
- Palo, Saskatchewan, Canada, a hamlet located within Rosemount Rural Municipality No. 378

== People with the surname ==
- Marko Palo, Finnish ice hockey player
- Tauno Palo, Finnish actor

== Other uses ==
- Palo (OLAP database), an open source MOLAP database
- Palo (religion), developed by slaves from Central Africa in Cuba
- PALO!, an Afro-Cuban funk band
- Palo (flamenco), the name for a musical form in flamenco
- PALO, Linux bootloader for HP-PA systems
- Palos, long drums used in the music of the Dominican Republic
- Palo, an album by the Finnish band Kalmah
- A name for baston (weapon), a stick used in the Filipino martial art arnis
- Palo, the family nickname of Paul of Greece (1901–1964)
