= T in the Park 2014 =

Music festival in Scotland

T in the Park
- Dates: 10–13 July 2014
- Locations: Balado, Scotland, UK
- Years active: 1994–2016
- Website: http://tinthepark.com/

T in the Park 2014 was a three-day music festival which took place between 10–13 July 2014 in Balado, Kinross, the 21st festival since it was founded in 1994. It was the last T in the Park festival to be held in Balado as it will be moved to Strathallan Castle for T in the Park 2015. Arctic Monkeys were the first to be announced on 19 November 2013 as a headliner act. For the first time the Saturday night entertainment was extended by an hour to finish at 1 am.

== Tickets ==
A limited number of 'Early Bird' tickets for T in the Park went on sale at 9AM Friday 19 July at 2013 prices, with a £50 deposit required to secure a ticket. The tickets were priced as follows:

- Full weekend camping ticket (Friday-Sunday arena access) – Cost: £194
- Full weekend access ticket with Thursday camping (Thursday – Sunday) – Cost: £205
- Weekend access ticket (Friday-Sunday) with no camping – Cost: £184

The £50 deposit scheme gave the customer the option to break up the ticket payment into three instalments. The payment break up depended on which ticket type is chosen. The breakups for the tickets were as follows:

Weekend Camping Ticket

- Initial payment – £50 (plus booking fee)
- Payment due before 1 November – £72
- Payment due before 1 February – £72 (plus transaction fee)

Thursday Weekend Camping Ticket

- Initial payment – £50 (plus booking fee)
- Payment due before 1 November – £77.50
- Payment due before 1 February – £77.50 (plus transaction fee)

Non-camping Weekend Ticket

- Initial payment – £50 (plus booking fee)
- Payment due before 1 November – £62
- Payment due before 1 February – £62 (plus transaction fee)

If the second or third instalments were not paid the £50 deposit was lost along with the booking fee and the reservation of the ticket. In addition to the aforementioned offers, there were also combined ticket and bus options available.

== Line-up ==
The headliner acts for 2014 were announced as Biffy Clyro, Calvin Harris and Arctic Monkeys.

The Scottish Sun Big Top
Thursday 10 July	Friday 11 July	Saturday 12 July	Sunday 13 July
Midnight Beast	Comedy Rap Battles; The LaFontaines	Billy Kirkwood; Scott Gibson; Ray Bradshaw; Russell Kane; John Cooper Clarke	Gary Little; Bastille; Lee Nelson

Main Stage
Friday 11 July	Saturday 12 July	Sunday 13 July
Biffy Clyro; 22:20-23:50; Ed Sheeran; 20:40-21:40; Ellie Goulding; 19:20-20:10; Imagine Dragons; 18:05-18:50; Haim; 16:45-17:35; You Me At Six; 15:30-16:15; Charli XCX; 14:30-15:00	Calvin Harris; 23:35-00:00; Paolo Nutini; 21:45-22:55; Pharrell Williams; 20:15-21:15; Rudimental; 18:40-19:40; James; 17:10-18:10; Twin Atlantic; 15:55-16:40; Katie B 14:40-15:25; The Stranglers; 13:20-14:10; Kiesza; 12:15-12:50	Arctic Monkeys; 21:20-22:50; Jake Bugg; 19:45-20:45; Paul Weller; 18:15-19:15; Bastille; 16:55-17:45; Kaiser Chiefs; 15:35-16:25; Kodaline; 14:20-15:05; Newton Faulkner; 13:05-13:50; Red Hot Chilli Pipers; 12:30-12:50

Radio 1 Stage
Friday 11 July	Saturday 12 July	Sunday 13 July
Steve Angello; 22:35-23:50; Alesso; 20:50-21:55; DJ Fresh; 19:20-20:20; Danny Howard; 18:00-18:50; Maxïmo Park; 16:40-17:30; Foxes; 15:30-16:10; Neon Jungle; 14:30-15:30	Elbow; 23:35-00:00; Bombay Bicycle Club; 21:55-22:55; The 1975; 20:25-21:25; The Charlatans; 18:55-19:55; John Newman; 17:35-18:25; Clean Bandit; 16:20-17:05; Ella Eyre; 15:10-15:50; Sophie Ellis-Bextor; 14:00-14:40; Twenty One Pilots; 12:50-13:30	Disclosure; 21:30-22:50; Tinie Tempah; 19:50-20:50; Above & Beyond; 18:30-19:20; London Grammer; 17:10-18:00; Sam Smith; 15:55-16:40; Chance the Rapper; 14:45-15:25; Reverend & The Makers; 13:35-14:15; Inspiral Carpets; 12:30-13:05

King Tut's Wah Wah Tent
Friday 11 July	Saturday 12 July	Sunday 13 July
Pixies; 22:35-23:50; Manic Street Preachers; 20:50-22:05; Chvrches; 19:20-20:20; The Magic Numbers; 18:05-18:50; Royal Blood; 16:55-17:35; Drenge; 15:45-16:25; The Rifles; 14:45-15:15	Ben Howard; 23:35-00:00; Embrace; 22:05-23:05; The Human League; 20:35-21:35; Soul II Soul; 19:05-20:05; Nina Nesbitt; 17:50-18:35; We Are Scientists; 16:35-17:20; George Ezra; 15:20-16:05; Fatherson; 14:20-14:55; Circa Waves; 13:15-13:50	Example; 21:35-22:50; Franz Ferdinand; 20:00-21:00; Tame Impala; 18:30-19:30; Passenger; 17:10-18:00; Metronomy; 15:55-16:40; Wilkinson; 14:50-15:25; The Twilight Sad; 13:45-14:20; Tijuana Bibles; 12:40-13:15

Slam Tent
Thursday 10 July	Friday 11 July	Saturday 12 July	Sunday 13 July
Sub Club's Harri & Domenic; 20:00-00:00	Len Faki; 22:30-00:00; Pan-Pot; 21:00-22:30; Jackmaster; 19:30-21:00; Clouds; 18:00-19:30; Pretty Lights; 16:30-18:00; Factory Floor; 15:30-16:30; Alex Smoke; 14:00-15:30	Joris Voorn; 23:30-01:00; Robert Hood; 22:10-23:30; Dave Clarke; 20:40-22:10; Guy Gerber; 19:20-20:40; Magda; 18:00-19:20; Carl Craig; 16:30-18:00; Skream; 15:00-16:30; Duke Dumont; 13:30-15:00; Jaguar Skills; 12:00-13:30	Sven Vath; 21:00-23:00; Slam; 19:45-21:00; Tale of Us; 18:30-19:45; Julio Bashmore; 17:15-18:30; Kerri Chandler; 16:00-17:15; George Fitzgerald; 14:45-16:00; Levon Vincent; 13:15-14:45; Mark Henning; 12:00-13:15

T-Break Stage
Friday 11 July	Saturday 12 July	Sunday 13 July
Tuff Love Teencanteen Deathcats Wolf Alice Mnek Dan Croll Lonely The Brave Lyger Vladimir	Birdhead Fat Goth Atom Tree Medicine Man The Temperance Movement Elliphant Billy Lockett The Lafontaines The Jezabels Chloe Howl Neon Waltz All About She The Moon Kids We Came From Wolves	Tisoki Blood Relatives Secret Motorbikes Vigo Thieves King Charles Darlia Catfish & The Bottlemen Jess Glynne Model Aeroplanes Hunter & The Bear Scary People Kill The Waves

BBC Introducing Stage
Friday 11 July	Saturday 12 July	Sunday 13 July
	The Amazing Snakeheads Charlotte OC Copper Lungs Cynikal George Ezra Florrie Lisbon Hannah Trigwell Go Wolf Beta Blocker And The Body Clock Brownbear	Slaves Call To Mind New Desert Blues Medals Silver Arm One Bit CHVRCHES Eilidh Hadden Nothing but Thieves Baby Queen Tijuana Bibles

== Incidents ==
The number of arrests in 2014 fell to 52, which was significantly less than 2013 where there was 91 arrests.

} This could be attributed to the fact Showsec International Ltd replaced G4S Secure Solutions as the security provider for the event in 2014.

Chief superintendent Jim Leslie said: Generally the behavior of fans this year has been excellent. Praise must go to them for playing their part in keeping crime figures down; for the majority, people were in tremendous spirits and focused on being here for the right reasons, to enjoy music and have a great time with friends.

The number of visits to the medical tent also dramatically dropped in 2014, with the medical team reporting 980 visits to the hospital tent. This is a sharp decrease when compared with the 1160 visits in 2013. The visits to the medical tent were all minor, such as: weather related ailments and sprains and strains.

== Reception ==
Most festival-goers were happy with conditions at the festival, and remarked positively on the strength and variety of the headliners.

== New location ==
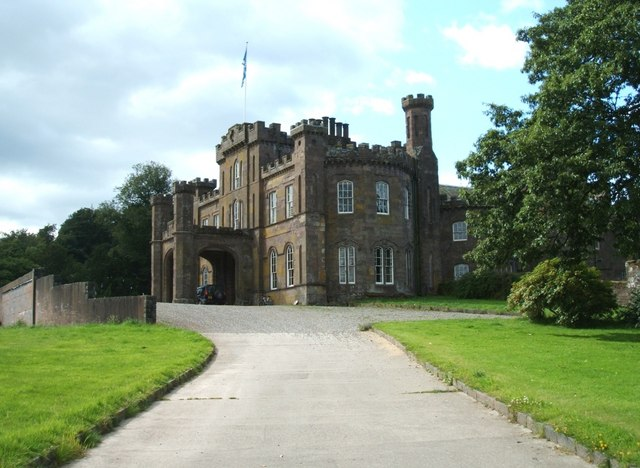
Strathallan Castle

In 2015, the festival was relocated to Strathallan Castle.

This was due to a section of the festival grounds being situated over the Fortes Pipeline, causing the Health and Safety Executive(HSE) to request for the festival to be relocated away from its current site at Balado. According to HSE, an accident could result in a large number of casualties and people receiving a dangerous dose of thermal radiation.

== See also ==
- List of music festivals in the United Kingdom
