= Special Cases (band) =

Chilean rock band

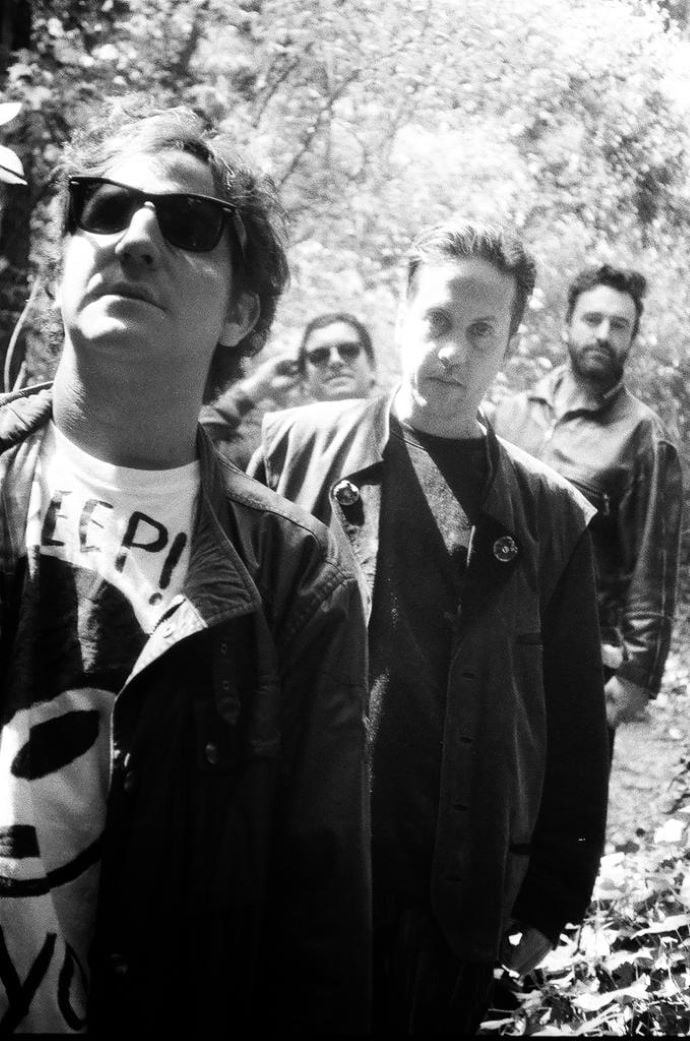
- Special Cases at Camino El Canal (Santiago, Chile). October 2023.

Background information
- Origin: Santiago, Chile
- Genres: alternative rock; ambient; indie rock; neo-psychedelia; psychedelic rock; psychedelia; space rock
- Years active: 2011–present
- Labels: Blow Your Mind; Weisskalt; ETCS Records
- Members: Juan Pablo Rodriguez; Martin Line; Mauricio Telini; Chiri Elizalde
- Website: bymrecords.com

Special Cases is a band with members of Föllakzoid, Chicos de Nazca and 10 Years Lost, based in Santiago, Chile.

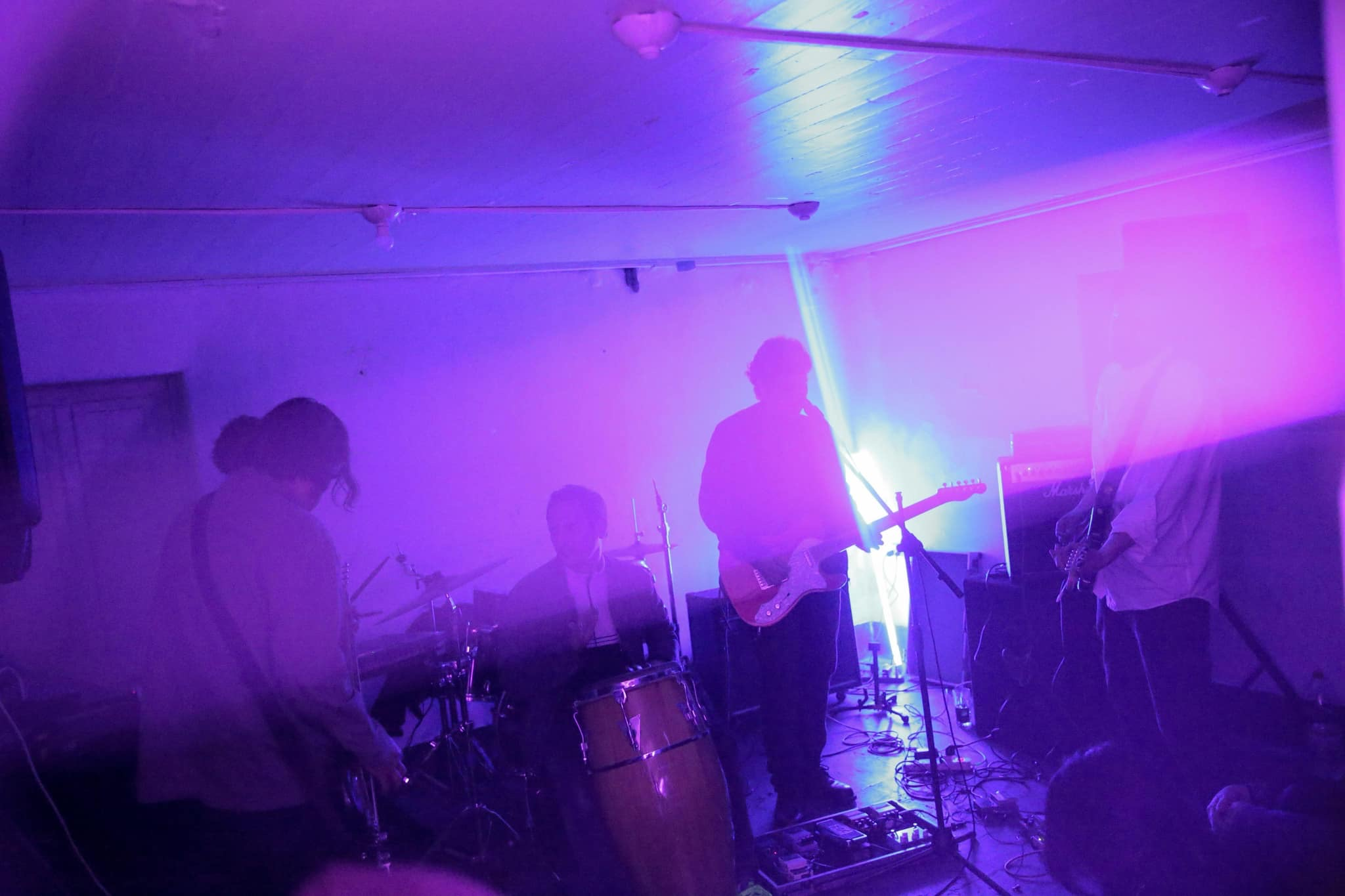
Special Cases performing live in Bellavista (Santiago, Chile). September 7th 2024.

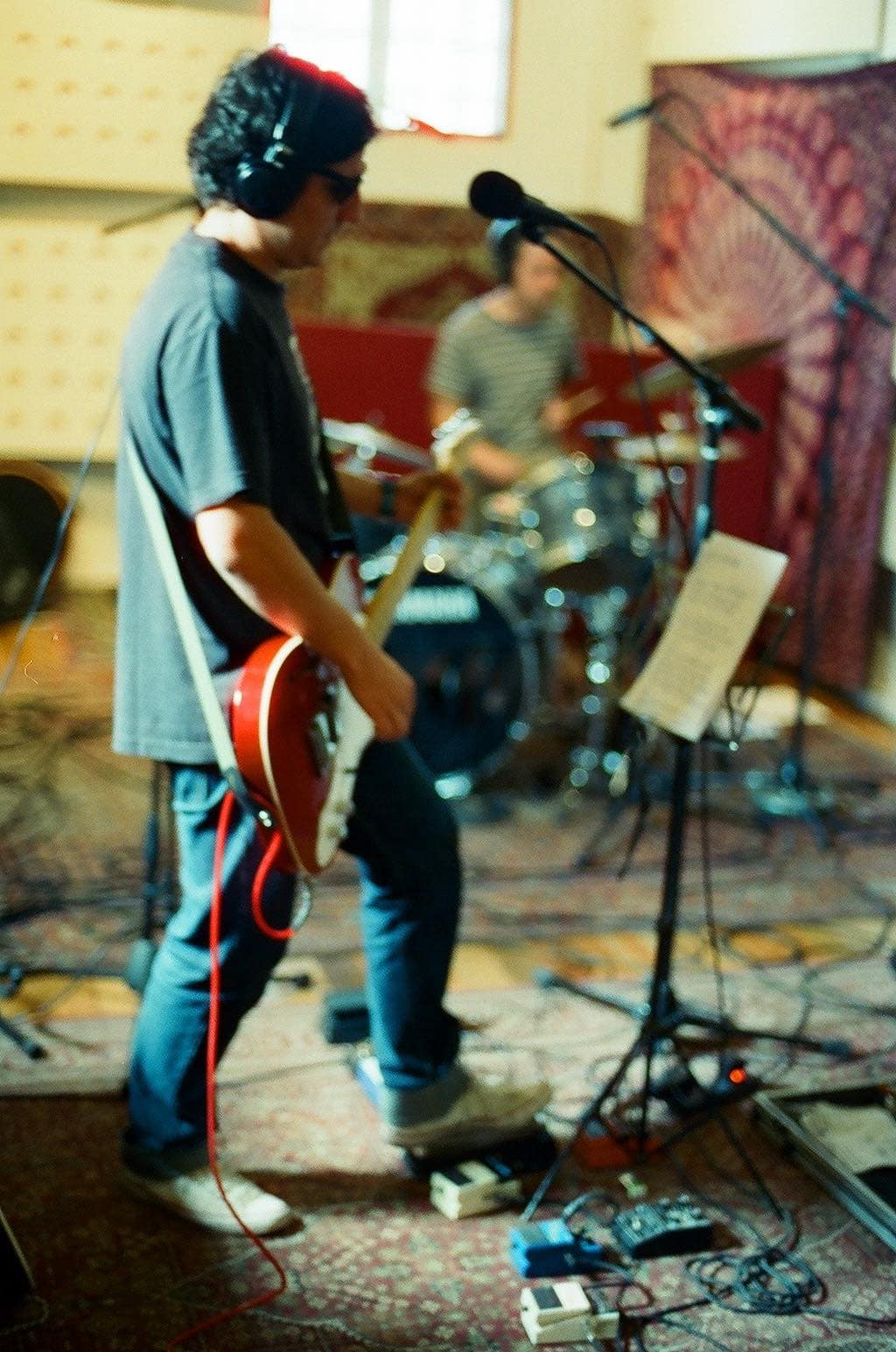
Special Cases recording at Lautaro Studios (Santiago, Chile). December 16th 2023.

== History ==
The band was originally the solo project of multi-instrumentalist musician, songwriter and a Föllakzoid founder Juan Pablo Rodríguez, formed in 2011 and used as a vehicle to explore instrumental active ambient and space rock music with the following equipment: Roland JD800, Roland SPX404 and Samick guitar.

Their debut album, the eponymously titled Special Cases has received critical acclaim since 2020, with The Quietus’ Brian Coney praising its place in neo psychedelic music and the legacy of Föllakzoid, "As a whole, though, Special Cases spills over with low-key majesty and purpose. From the vantage point of the future where his band have cornered a niche within modern psychedelia, it evinces JPR as a rare shaman of kosmiche savvy."

Since late 2020, Special Cases has developed into a fully fledged live band centred around Rodríguez with songwriting and performance geared towards alternative and psychedelic rock. As a live act, they have performed at numerous venues and festivals across Chile, captivating audiences with their dynamic stage presence and infectious energy.

The influences of the band are derived from art, poetry and film. Lyrically, inspiration is occasionally drawn from artists such as Sonic Youth's Thurston Moore and Kim Gordon with atmosphere resonating from directors such as David Lynch. The track Believe from their most current album 6 is expressive of appreciation for Spacemen 3's Jason Pierce and his work as Spiritualized.

Visual Artists Tomás Olivos and Martin Line have contributed album art on various records.

The band has physical releases on cassette, CD and vinyl spread across the following record labels: Blow Your Mind, Weisskalt and ETCS Records with the music distributed by Sacred Bones, Midheaven Revolver, Cargo Records, Rough Trade and Tower Records.

== Discography ==
=== Studio albums ===
- Special Cases (2014)
- Better Days (2018)
- Album Name (2020)
- Acoustic Emanations (2020)
- No Mind (2021)
- 6 (2024)
