= Walter Domínguez =

Uruguayan footballer (born 1999)

Personal information
- Full name: Walter Alfredo Domínguez Domínguez
- Date of birth: 13 June 1999 (age 27)
- Place of birth: Mercedes, Uruguay
- Position: Striker

Team information
- Current team: Independiente Soriano

Senior career*
Years	Team	Apps	(Gls)
2022	Fray Bentos	14	(13)
2023–2024	Juventud Soriano	19	(38)
2024	Fénix	?	(?)
2025-	Independiente Soriano	?	(?)

International career^{‡}
2024	Uruguay local	1	(0)
- * Club domestic league appearances and goals ‡ National team caps and goals as of 31 May 2024

Walter Alfredo Domínguez Domínguez (born 13 June 1999) is a Uruguayan footballer who plays as a striker for Independiente Soriano.

== Club career ==
He played for Uruguayan side Fray Bentos. After that, he signed for Uruguayan side Juventud Soriano. He has been described as "one of the great figures of interior football".

== International career ==
In May 2024, Domínguez was named in the first ever Uruguay local national team squad. He made his Uruguay local team debut on 31 May 2024 in a goalless draw against Costa Rica.

== Style of play ==
He mainly operates as a striker. He has been described as a "dribbler and vertical player".

== Honours ==
=== Club ===
Juventud Soriana

- Copa Nacional de Selecciones: 2023–24

== Personal life ==
He has been nicknamed "Waltercito". He is the brother of Uruguayan footballer Mauricio "Quique" Martínez.
