= Clubz =

Mexican electropop duo

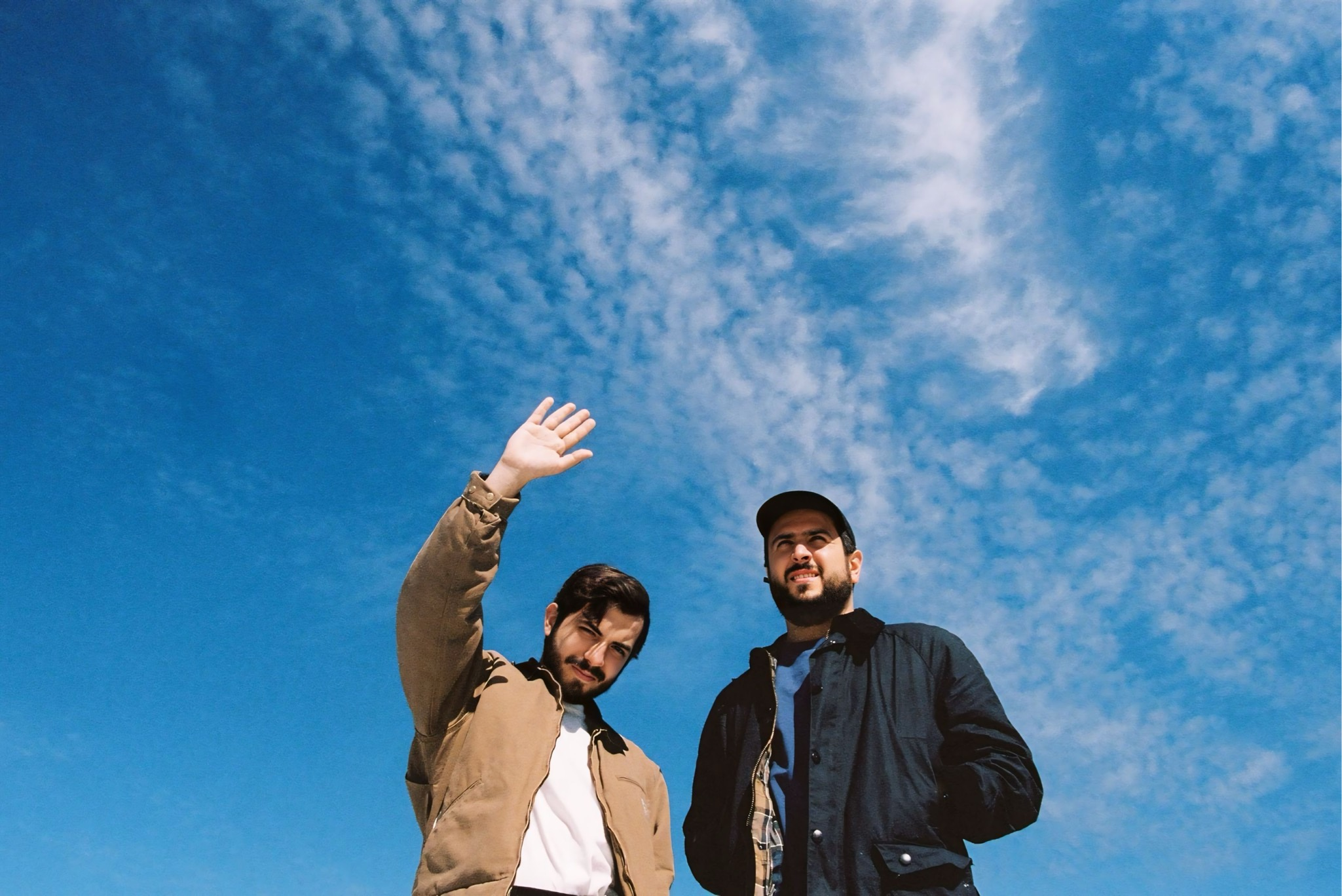

Background information
- Origin: Monterrey, Nuevo León, Mexico
- Genres: Electropop; Indie pop; Funk; Dream pop
- Years active: 2013–present
- Label: Independent
- Members: Coco Santos; Orlando Fernández
- Website: https://www.clubzclubz.com/

Clubz (stylized as CLUBZ) is a Mexican electropop and indie pop duo formed in 2013 in Monterrey, Mexico. It consists of Coco Santos (vocals and keyboards) and Orlando Fernández (vocals and guitar). They won Best New Artist and Best Pop Album for their EP Texturas in 2015, and Song of the Year for "Épocas" in 2016 at the IMAs (Independent Music Awards).

== History ==
Coco met Orlando after seeing him perform in a band called Lemons. They later developed a friendship based on shared musical interests, including bands like Miniature Tigers, The Strokes, Phoenix, and Taking Back Sunday. After the dissolution of their respective bands, they decided to join forces and create a new music project called Husky. They initially considered the name Jamz, but after discovering a band with that name already existed, they opted for Clubz, inspired by the album Club negro by María y José. Their career began gaining momentum thanks to attention from music blogs on platforms like SoundCloud and Tumblr. The project emerged online as a response to the violent period their city was going through, which limited opportunities for live performances. With few venues available, their main option — besides live shows — was to upload their music to social media. This led to international recognition from music outlets like The Fader and Stereogum.

== Career ==
They have released two studio albums: Destellos (2018) and Radio Kono (2025), and two EPs: Texturas (2014) and Épocas (2015). Some of their most popular songs include: “Palmeras,” “Nagano,” “Áfrika,” “Templos,” “Épocas,” “Popscuro,” “Fama mundial,” “El rollo,” and “Cáile.” Their sound is influenced by genres such as disco, funk, and R&B, while also incorporating synthesizers, electric bass, and saxophone. They draw inspiration from the electropop of the '80s and '90s — in fact, in their studio, they used a drum machine, specifically an Oberheim DMX, an instrument famously used by bands like New Order and Madonna. They have collaborated with artists such as Little Jesus, Buscabulla, Girl Ultra, and Ela Minus, among others. CLUBZ has performed at major festivals like Vive Latino in Mexico City, Pa'l Norte in Monterrey, and Borderland in Ciudad Juárez. Their international fame grew as they performed in countries like the United States, Costa Rica, and Ecuador. In 2016, they opened for Tame Impala during their Mexico tour.

== Discography ==
=== Studio albums ===
- Destellos (2018)
- Radio Kono (2025)

=== Extended plays ===
- Texturas (2014)
- Épocas (2015)
