= Rey Fresco =

American band

- Origin: Ventura, California, United States
- Genres: Rock; Reggae; World; Soul; Latin
- Years active: 2008–present
- Labels: Eight O Five Record, Fontana Distribution
- Members: Roger Keiaho; Xocoyotzin “Xoco” Moraza; Shawn Echevarria; Andrew Jones Matt Rayner; Joe Baugh Ryan Gleason
- Website: reyfresco.com

Rey Fresco is an American band from Ventura, California, that performs an eclectic mix of rock, reggae, world, soul and Latin music. It features a 36 string arpa jarocha Veracruz harp as one of their lead instruments.

== History ==
Rey Fresco was formed in 2008 by four longtime friends and prominent members of the Ventura, California music scene. The band is composed of Xocoyotzin “Xoco” Moraza, a graduate of UCLA who holds a degree in Ethnomusicology. Andrew Jones, surf board shaper, drum maker and drummer. Roger Keiaho, vocalist and guitarist, a native of Fiji and whose younger brother is NFL linebacker Freddy Keiaho, Shawn Echevarria, bassist. All brought their diverse personal and musical backgrounds together to create the band's original sound.

Taking the name Rey Fresco (Spanish for Fresh King), the band began gigging constantly in their local market. From sell out performances at their hometown's largest venue, The Ventura Theater to stand out sets at Santa Barbara's West Beach Music Festival and Ventura's Hillside Music Festival, the band developed a large underground following in the Southern California music scene.

In 2009, Rey Fresco was signed by Fitzgerald Hartley Management as the first artist on their upstart indie label, Eight O Five Records. The band's debut, The People, was released digitally in the fall of 2009 and released physically in the fall of 2010. The band embarked on their first tour in support of the record in December 2009 opening for reggae legends, Toots and the Maytals.

The band's instrumental version of the song “Pajaro Cu” is currently being used in a 2011 Ford Explorer TV commercial. The commercial also features two of the band members, Moraza and Jones, performing.

== Media coverage ==
Rey Fresco has been reviewed favorably by New York Daily News, National Geographic and a host of regional publications. The VC Reporter called their debut record, “a stellar debut, full of vision and hope that announces the arrival of an important and genre-defying band.” The record's first single, “Precious Time” was added to several radio stations in the fall of 2009 and the song “Roll Your Dice” was National Public Radio's “Song of the Day” on Tuesday, December 8, 2009.

== Members ==
- Roger Keiaho - vocals, guitar
- Xocoyotzin “Xoco” Moraza - harp, requinto, guitar
- Shawn Echevarria - bass
- Andrew Jones - drums
- Matt Rayner - percussion / manager 2022–present
- Joe Baugh - lead guitar
- Ryan Gleason -drums 2022–present

== Discography ==
- The People, 2009

== Associations ==
In Rey Fresco's career they have performed with the following notable artists: 311, Colbie Caillat, Michael Franti and Spearhead, Ben Harper, Little Feat, G. Love & Special Sauce, Taj Mahal, Damian Marley, Julian Marley, Ziggy Marley, Nas, Ozomatli Toots and the Maytals and Incubus.
