= Rivo =

Rivo may refer to:

== People ==
- Peter de Rivo (1420–1490), Flemish scholastic philosopher
- Radulph of Rivo, Dutch Roman Catholic historian and liturgist
- Rivo Rakotovao (born 1960), Malagasy politician
- Rivo Vesik (born 1980), Estonian beach volleyball player
- Rivo Andriamamonjy (born 1963), French volleyball player

== Places ==
- Rivo or Rvo, Azerbaijan
- Rivo, Paluzza, Italy
- Rivo, Terni, Italy
- Rivo Alto Island, United States

== Other ==
- Volkswagen Rivo
- Rio (disambiguation)
- Ríos (disambiguation)
