= Koi Child =

Music group from Perth, Western Australia

- Origin: Perth, Western Australia
- Genres: Hip hop; jazz
- Years active: 2014–2018
- Label: Warner Music Australia
- Members: Shannon Cruz Patterson; Blake Hart; Christian Ruggiero; Jamie Canny; Sam Newman; Tom Kenny; Yann Vissac
- Website: koichild.com

Koi Child was an Australian hip-hop band from Fremantle, Perth, Western Australia. They formed in 2014 through the combination of two bands; Kashikoi and Child's Play. Their self-titled debut album was recorded, mixed and co-produced by Kevin Parker of Tame Impala and was released in March 2016. In 2018, Koi Child disbanded.

== Band members ==
- Shannon Cruz Patterson – vocals (2014–2018)
- Blake Hart – drums (2014–2018)
- Christian Ruggiero – tenor saxophone (2014–2018), baritone saxophone (2016–2018)
- Jamie Canny – alto saxophone (2014–2018)
- Sam Newman – trombone (2014–2018)
- Tom Kenny – keyboards and synthesizers (2014–2017)
- Yann Vissac – bass guitar (2014–2018)

== Discography ==
=== Studio albums ===
| Title | Details |
|---|---|
| Koi Child | Released: 2016; Label: Pilerats Records (PR018); Format: CD, LP, digital download |

== Awards and nominations ==
=== ARIA Music Awards ===
The ARIA Music Awards is an annual awards ceremony that recognises excellence, innovation, and achievement across all genres of Australian music.

| Year | Nominee / work | Award | Result |
|---|---|---|---|
| 2016 | Koi Child | Best Urban Album | Nominated |

=== WAM Awards ===
Koi Child have won five awards from eight nominations.

| Year | Nominee / work | Award | Result |
|---|---|---|---|
| 2015 | Koi Child | Best Urban Act | Nominated |
| 2015 | Koi Child | Most Popular New Act | Won |
| 2015 | "Black Panda" | Most Popular Music Video | Nominated |
| 2016 | Koi Child | Most Popular Act | Won |
| 2016 | Koi Child | Best Urban Act (tied win with Mathas) | Won |
| 2016 | Koi Child | Best Album | Won |
| 2016 | Tom Kenny | Best Keys/Synth Artist | Nominated |
| 2016 | "1-5-9" | Most Popular Music Video | Won |
