= Little Jesus (band) =

Mexican indie rock band

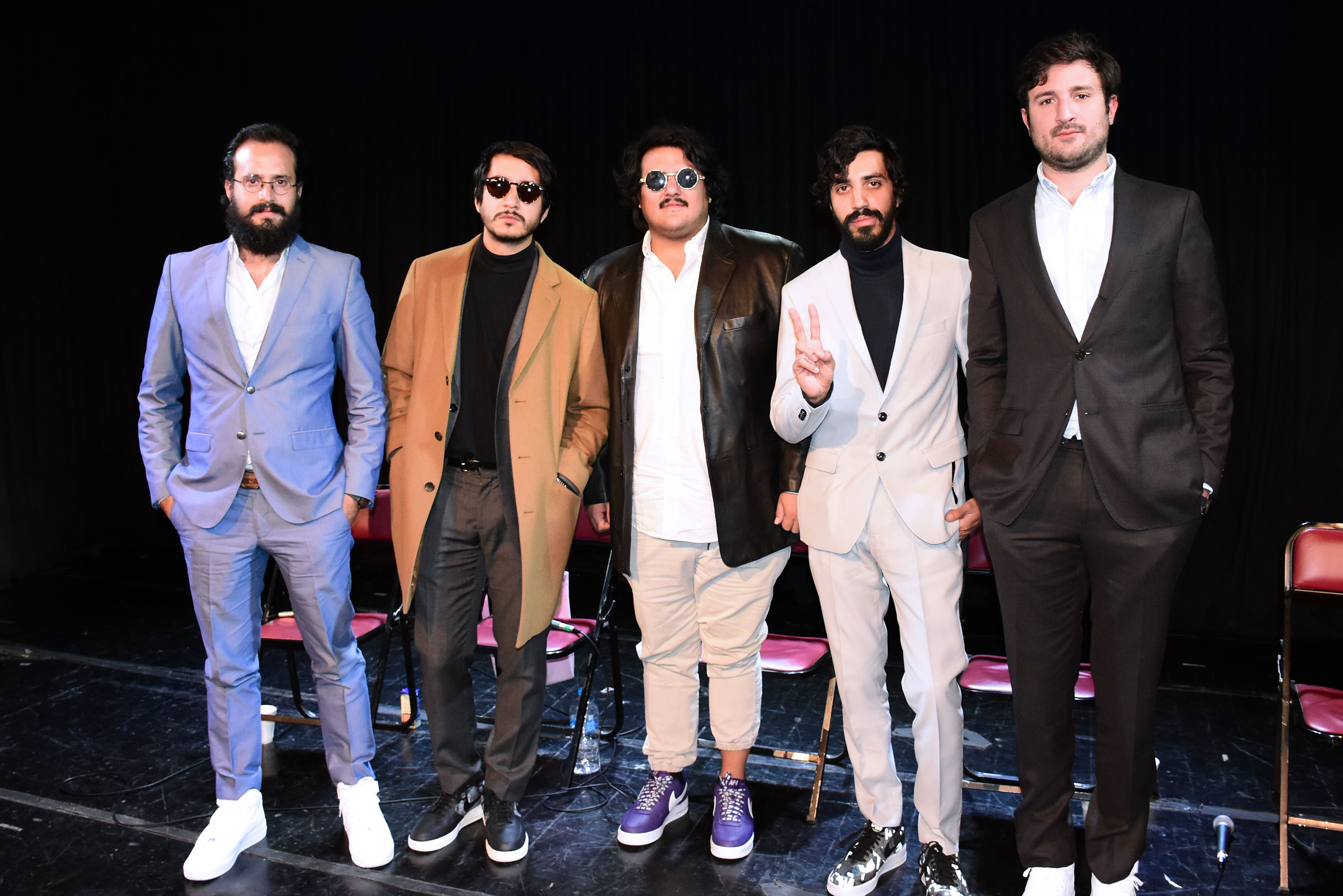

Background information
- Origin: Mexico City, Mexico
- Genres: Indie rock; Pop rock; Trop rock; Latin alternative
- Years active: 2012–present
- Labels: Sony Music Mexico
- Members: Santiago Casillas; Carlos Medina; Juan Manuel Sánchez "Truco"; Arturo Vázquez; Fernando Bueno
- Website: https://thelittlejesus.bandcamp.com/track/berl-n

Little Jesus (stylized as LJ) is a Mexican indie rock band. The band is composed of Santiago Casillas (vocals), Juan Manuel Sánchez Rucobo (drums), Fernando Bueno (guitar), Arturo Vázquez-Vela (keyboards), and Carlos Medina (bass). In 2023, their debut album Norte was certified Gold by the Mexican Association of Phonogram and Videogram Producers (AMPROFON) for selling over 30,000 copies.

== History ==
The band began when Santiago gave up his interest in football to study music at Berklee College of Music in Boston. They started performing in small venues in the Greater Mexico City area, such as Texcoco de Mora, San Juan de Aragón, and Tultitlán, before gaining more attention in the indie scene with shows at venues like Estela de Luz and later El Imperial, a renowned live music bar in the capital. The band’s name comes from an alias Santiago created before leaving to study music; he made necklaces with a logo of the name, which he gave to friends and fellow bands.

== Career ==
They have released four studio albums: Norte (2013), Río salvaje (2016), Disco de oro (2019) and El show debe continuar (2024). They also released a Japanese version of their debut: Norte (Japanese Version) (2014). Their most popular songs include: “Azul,” “Pesadilla,” “Berlín,” “Norte,” “Color,” “Químicos,” “Se fue,” “Presente,” “La magia,” “TQM,” “Los años maravillosos,” “Fuera de lugar,” among others. Their lyrics often explore themes of love, heartbreak, and nostalgia, frequently using metaphors related to extraterrestrial life — a distinctive trait of the band.

They draw influence from artists such as Vampire Weekend, Radiohead, The Strokes, Phoenix, Michael Jackson, Pink Floyd, and Alan Parsons. They have received seven Indie-O Music Awards, including Song of the Year for “Azul,” as well as Best Artwork/Packaging for the Japanese version of Norte, and Video of the Year for “Norte.” They were also nominated for Video of the Year for “Cretino” and Best Live Act in 2015.

They have collaborated with artists such as Ximena Sariñana, Zoe Gotusso, Clubz, Girl Ultra, Caloncho and Elsa y Elmar.

== Discography ==
- Norte (2013)
- Río Salvaje (2016)
- Disco de Oro (2019)
- El show debe continuar (2024)
