= Forbidden Fruit (festival) =

Annual music festival held in Dublin, Ireland

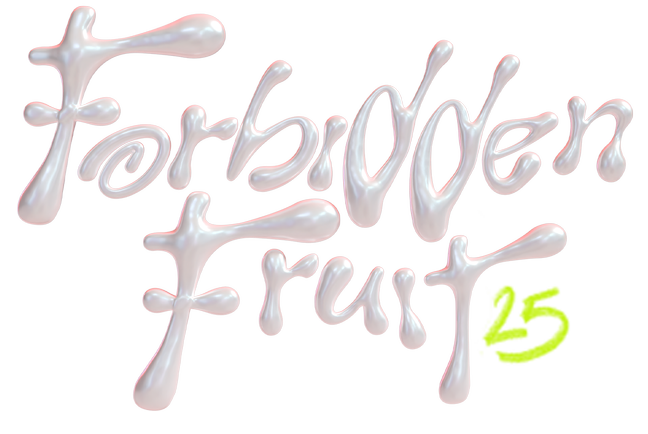
- Logo of the 2025 iteration of the festival
- Status: Active
- Genre: Music Festival
- Frequency: Annually
- Locations: Royal Hospital Kilmainham in Dublin, Ireland
- Coordinates: 53°20′35.80″N 6°18′0.77″W
- Country: Ireland
- Inaugurated: June 2, 2011
- Capacity: Approximately 15,000
- Website: www.forbiddenfruit.ie

Forbidden Fruit is a music festival that has been held annually at the shared grounds between the Irish Museum of Modern Art and the Royal Hospital Kilmainham in Dublin, Ireland since 2011. It traditionally takes place over the June bank holiday weekend (first weekend of June) and was launched as a city-based alternative to rural camping festivals. The event is known for its urban setting and diverse line-ups in its early years, which featured a mix of indie, hip-hop, electronic, and pop acts. Over time, the festival gradually shifted its focus towards electronic music, becoming a key date on the Irish electronic music calendar. Past performers have included Lorde, Aphex Twin, Justice, Flume, Skepta, Tame Impala, James Blake, and Bon Iver.

== History ==
Forbidden Fruit began in 2011 as a diverse, city-centre festival that showcased a broad mix of genres including indie rock, hip-hop, folk, and electronic music. Bulmers sponsored the first years of the festival, which was branded as "Bulmers Forbidden Fruit Festival". Early line-ups reflected a balanced curation, placing acts like Bell X1 and Public Enemy alongside 2manydjs and James Blake. Its reputation was built on this eclecticism, with a weekend programme that appealed to a wide audience. However, from around 2015 onwards, the festival began to shift its focus more squarely towards electronic music, booking an increasing number of techno, house, and experimental electronic artists. Acts such as Peggy Gou became mainstage draws, and acts such as Joy Orbison, Nightmares on Wax, Jon Hopkins and Paul Kalkbrenner filled out the line-ups, by the late 2010s the festival had become associated with the European electronic scene. While some hip-hop and alternative acts continue to appear, Forbidden Fruit in the 2020s leans towards being an electronic music festival.
