= Girl Ultra =

- Born: Mariana de Miguel; Mexico City, Mexico
- Genre: R&B
- Occupations: Singer, songwriter
- Label: Finesse Records

Mariana de Miguel (born 1996), better known as Girl Ultra, is a Mexican R&B artist. She signed to Mexican label Finesse Records in 2016 and released her debut EP, Boys, in 2017. Boys includes a Spanish language cover of Daniel Caesar track "Get You". She released her second EP, Adiós, in 2018.

== Early life and artistry ==
Mariana 'Nan' de Miguel was born and raised in Mexico City. She was part of a disco band called Affer in high school. Her influences included music by Beyoncé and Destiny's Child.

In 2019, Girl Ultra collaborated with Cuco on "Damelove", a bilingual song in English and Spanish recorded in Los Angeles.

She collaborated with Little Jesus for her 2022 song "Punk" which samples Gwen Stefani's "Bubble Pop Electric".

== Discography ==
Studio albums

- Adiós (2018)
- Nuevos Aires (2019)
- El Sur (2022)

Collaborative albums

- RRRomeo with Chromeo (2026)

EPs

- Boys (2017)
- Blush (2024)
