= Föllakzoid =

Chilean rock band

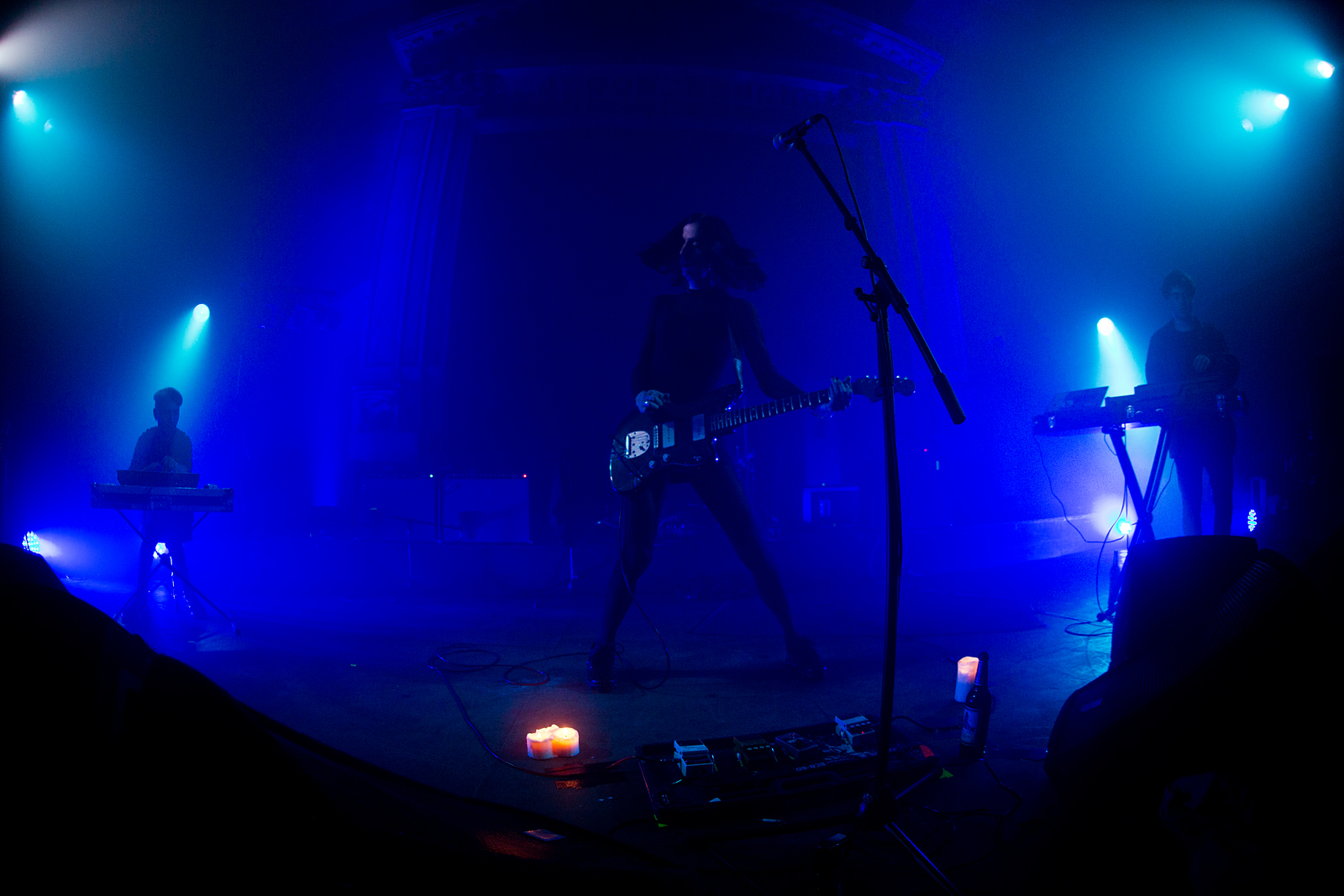
- Föllakzoid at UT Connewitz (Leipzig) in 2019

Background information
- Origin: Santiago, Chile
- Genres: Space rock; psychedelic rock; techno
- Years active: 2007–present
- Labels: Blow Your Mind; Sacred Bones
- Spinoffs: Special Cases
- Members: Domingæ Garcia Huidobro
- Past members: Juan Pablo Rodríguez; Diego Lorca; Francisco Zenteno; Gonzalo Laguna; Ives Sepulveda; Alfredo Thiermann
- Website: sacredbonesrecords.com/collections/follakzoid

Föllakzoid is the solo project of Chilean musician Domingæ Garcia Huidobro. Formed in 2007 in Santiago as a full-piece psychedelic rock band, the band is known for melding influences from Krautrock, Andean music and electronic music genres such as techno.

== History ==
Föllakzoid was formed on July 7, 2007 in Santiago, Chile. Founding the record label Blow Your Mind in 2009, the band released their self-titled debut album in 2009. Subsequently signing up to Sacred Bones Records, the band recorded a two-song EP in 2011. Their follow-up album, II was released in 2011. To accompany the release of the album, the band toured extensively, and was in the lineup for the festivals All Tomorrow's Parties and Lollapalooza.

For their third full-length album III (2015), the band collaborated with German electronic musician Uwe Schmidt. In 2017, the band collaborated with J. Spaceman on the live release, London Sessions. Collaborations further resumed with Schmidt in their subsequent albums, I (2019) and V (2023); by the time of IV's release, Föllakzoid became a solo project of Garcia Huidobro, who relocated to Mexico City. For I and V, the band has recorded individual stem files, which were then arranged by Schmidt into full compositions.

== Musical style ==
Föllakzoid's sound has been described as space rock and psychedelic rock. While the band's debut album mainly leaned on a desert rock sound, the band has subsequently included influences from Krautrock, Andean music and electronic music genres into their sound. Techno influences on the band's music has gradually increased by the time of their third record, III. The band's fourth studio album, I, was described as "a psychedelic blend of krautrock and minimal electronic music," while their record V was noted to be "straddling the line between vicious minimal techno and heady space rock."

== Members ==
=== Current members ===
- Domingæ Garcia Huidobro – guitar (2007–present), electronics (2014–2015, 2018–present), vocals (2016–2017)

=== Former members ===
- Juan Pablo Rodríguez – bass (2007–2018), vocals (2010–2018)
- Diego Lorca – drums (2007–2021), percussion (2011, 2014–2015)
- Francisco Zenteno – guitar (2007–2010)
- Gonzalo Laguna – vocals (2007–2010)
- Ives Sepulveda – guitar (2010–2011)
- Alfredo Thiermann — synthesizer, piano (2011–2013)

=== Former live/touring members ===
- Camilo Palma – synthesizer, electronics (2018)
- Roman Sebastian (a.k.a. Persona RS) – synthesizer, electronics (2018)

== Discography ==
Studio albums

- Föllakzoid (2009)
- II (2013)
- III (2015)
- I (2019)
- V (2023)

EPs

- Föllakzoid (2011)
- II RMX (2013)
- London Sessions (2017; with J. Spaceman)
