= Palos =

Palos may refer to:

== Arts and entertainment ==
- Palos, sacred music in the culture of the Dominican Republic
- Palo (flamenco), flamenco musical forms
- Palos (TV series), a 2008 Philippine TV drama

== People ==
- Brett Palos (born 1974), British property developer and entrepreneur
- Enrique Palos (born 1986), Mexican football goalkeeper
- Luciano Palos (born 1979), Argentine footballer
- Péter Pálos (born 1985), Hungarian para table tennis player
- Stasha Palos (born 1972), British artist and author

== Places ==
- Paloș (disambiguation), several places in Romania
- Palos Township, Illinois, US
- Palos site, archaeological site in Illinois, US
- Palos de la Frontera, Spain, from where Columbus sailed in 1492
- Cape Palos, cape on the Mediterranean coast of Spain
- Palos (crater), on Mars

== Other uses ==
- USS Palos, the name of several ships

== See also ==
- Palo (disambiguation)
- Battle of Cape Palos (disambiguation)
- Palos Verdes Peninsula, Los Angeles, US
  - Palos Verdes Hills
