= List of ship launches in 1750 =

The list of ship launches in 1750 includes a chronological list of some ships launched in 1750.

Date	Ship	Class	Builder	Location	Country	Notes
29 January	Royal Caroline	Royal yacht	John Hollond	Deptford Dockyard	Great Britain	For Royal Navy.
3 March	Berid-i Zafer	Fourth rate		Constantinople	Ottoman Empire	For Ottoman Navy.
24 March	Savage	Sloop-of-war	Thomas Fellowes	Woolwich Dockyard	Great Britain	For Royal Navy.
29 March	Grafton	Third rate	Pierson Lock	Portsmouth Dockyard	Great Britain	For Royal Navy.
25 May	Swiftsure	Third rate	John Hollond	Deptford Dockyard	Great Britain	For Royal Navy.
20 June	Infanta	Third rate	Matthew Mullins	Havana	(Spain) Cuba	For Spanish Navy.
16 July	Aigle	Ship of the line	P. Morineau	Rochefort	Kingdom of France	For French Navy.
3 August	Galicia	Third rate	Matthew Mullins	Havana	(Spain) Cuba	For Spanish Navy.
11 August	Florissant	Third rate	Pierre Morineau	Rochefort	Kingdom of France	For French Navy.
August	Opiniâtre	Third rate	Jean Geoffroy	Brest	Kingdom of France	For French Navy.
2 September	Orignal	Saint Laurent-class ship of the line	Chantier du Cul-de-Sac	Quebec City	New France	For French Navy. Broke in two on launch.
15 September	Princesa	Princesa-class ship of the line	Mathew Mullins	Havana	(Spain) Cuba	For Spanish Navy.
13 November	Caroline	Sailing ship		Copenhagen	Denmark-Norway	For Danish West India Company.
13 November	William	Sailing ship		Copenhagen	Denmark-Norway	For Danish West India Company.
1 December	Northumberland	Third rate	Fellows, Slade & Slade	Plymouth Dockyard	Great Britain	For Royal Navy.
4 December	Newcastle	Fourth rate	Pierson Lock	Portsmouth Dockyard	Great Britain	For Royal Navy.
18 December	Foudroyant	Third rate	François Coulomb	Toulon	Kingdom of France	For French Navy.
Unknown date	Anson	East Indiaman		Deptford	Great Britain	For British East India Company.
Unknown date	Bombay	Grab		Bombay	India	For British East India Company.
Unknown date	Hector	East Indiaman			Great Britain	For British East India Company.
Unknown date	Hardi	Hardi-class ship of the line	Pierre Moreau	Rochefort	Kingdom of France	For French Navy.
Unknown date	Illustre	Illustre-class ship of the line	Pierre Salinoc	Brest	Kingdom of France	For French Navy.
Unknown date	Mary	Full-rigged ship		Bombay	India	For Private owner.
Unknown date	Neptunus	Fourth rate			Denmark-Norway	For Dano-Norwegian Navy.
Unknown date	Prince George	East Indiaman			Great Britain	For British East India Company.
Unknown date	Prince Henry	East Indiaman			Great Britain	For British East India Company.
Unknown date	Saelland	Fourth rate			Denmark-Norway	For Dano-Norwegian Navy.
Unknown date	The Russells	Merchantman	Headlam	Gateshead	United Kingdom	For private owner.
Unknown date	Warwick	East Indiaman			Great Britain	For British East India Company.
