= Battle of Cape Palos =

The Battle of Cape Palos may refer to:

- Battle of the Gulf of Almería (1591), or Battle of Cape Palos, naval engagement of the Anglo-Spanish War
- Battle of Cape Palos (1617), naval engagement of the Spanish-Barbary Wars
- Battle of Cape Palos (1758), naval engagement of the Spanish-Barbary Wars
- Battle of Cape Palos (1815), naval engagement of the Second Barbary War
- Battle of Cape Palos (1938), naval engagement of the Spanish Civil War
