= Illusion V =

Super yacht

Illusion V is a super yacht built and developed by the Italian shipyard Benetti in partnership with the design office of Green & Mingarelli for interior and exterior decoration. Measuring the total of 58 meters (190.29ft) in length, it can reach a speed of 15.5 knots. Its interior has six cabins for twelve guests, and a total crew of thirteen people. Currently .
