= Brett Palos =

British property developer and businessman (born 1974)

- Born: Brett Alexander Palos; July 1974 (age 51–52)
- Occupation: Property developer
- Mother: Tina Green
- Relatives: Stasha Palos (sister)

Brett Alexander Palos (born July 1974) is a British property developer and entrepreneur. He is the founder of Brett Palos Investments and the chairman of The Thackery Estate. Palos owns Palos Developments, a luxury property development and design company in Miami Beach, Florida and is a significant shareholder in Dexter's London's largest estate agency.

Palos has been involved in the purchase of more than £1 billion of commercial and residential assets since 2012 with Brett Palos Investments.

== Early life ==
Brett Palos was born in 1974 to Robert Palos and Tina Green. His sister is Stasha Palos. His parents opened a clothing shop in Johannesburg, South Africa and expanded the business abroad. They divorced after 20 years together. Brett became the step-son of Philip Green when his mother Tina married the retailer in 1990.

== Career ==
In 1997, Palos was part of his step-father Philip Green’s negotiating team that outmaneuvered Sears plc when the company was selling its subsidiaries.

In 2003, Palos bought the office supplies group ISA from the receivers to its then US parent, Daisytek International. In 2005, ISA made a pre-tax profit of £5.9 million on sales of £231 million. In 2006, Palos appointed investment bank Rothschild to sell ISA. In 2007, Palos sold ISA to Electra Private Equity for a net gain of £35 million.

In 2008, Palos, then 33 years old, was ranked 1,727 in the Sunday Times rich list with a wealth of £43 million.

In 2009, Palos, along with partners Anthony Lyons and Simon Conway, purchased the O2 Centre on Finchley Road in London for over £90 million.

In 2010, Palos added more than 500 apartments to his property portfolio after buying them in a £400 million deal with Lloyds Banking Group.

In 2012, Palos, along with partner Antony Alberti, acquired The Thackeray Estate, a London-based property investment company that specialises in repositioning commercial, mixed-use and residential development projects.

In 2013, Palos started developing luxury spec homes in Miami. A few years later, his company Palos Developments sold a waterfront spec home on North Bay Road in Miami Beach for 20 million dollars. It was one of the highest sale prices ever on the street. Palos described the homes his company develops as "contemporary Balinese-Deco style."

In 2014, Matterhorn Palos Partnership, a joint venture between Brett Palos Investments and Matterhorn Capital, sold three Spire Healthcare hospitals for £110 million to the largest U.S. healthcare real estate trust. In 2015, Matterhorn Palos Partnership sold Kings Mall shopping centre in Hammersmith, London, to Schroders UK Real Estate fund in a deal worth £153 million.

In 2019, Palos’ Thackeray Estate sold Eastcheap Estate, a mixed-used scheme in London, for £45.5 million to Hong Kong investor LKK Health Products Group, the owner of the nearby Walkie-Talkie building.

In 2021 Palos teamed up with Oakley capital to back the growth of Dexter's now londons largest estate agent and he remains the largest individual shareholder.

== Personal life ==
Palos lives in London with his wife and three children. He owns a home in Miami Beach.
