= Action of 28 November 1751 =

1751 naval battle

Coordinates: 37.026°N 8.999°W

- Part of the Spanish-Barbary Wars
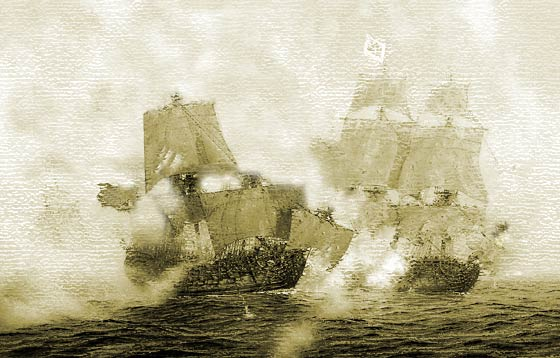
- Anonymous engraving depicting the final battle between the Dragón and the Danzik
Date	November 28 – December 2, 1751
Location	Off Cape St Vincent, Atlantic Ocean
Result	Spanish victory

Belligerents
Spain	Regency of Algiers

Commanders and leaders
Pedro Fitz-James Stuart	Mohammed Chirif

Strength
2 ships of the line	2 ships of the line

Casualties and losses
3 killed 25 wounded	194 killed 90 wounded 1 ship of line destroyed
- 50 European slaves freed

The action of 28 November 1751 was a naval engagement off Cape St. Vincent between a squadron of two Spanish ships of the line under captain Pedro Fitz-James Stuart and an Algerine squadron of two ships of the line under corsair Mohammed Chirif, which was fought from November 28 to December 2, 1751, and resulted in a victory for the Spanish fleet. The Algerine ships had come from the port of Algiers, and were acting as corsairs, conducting commerce raiding against Christian merchant ships and enslaving their crews. This was part of the Barbary slave trade, where the Barbary states, autonomous vassals of the Ottoman Empire, raided Christian settlements and merchant vessels for slaves to sell in their own cities. The corsairs targeted Spain, a Christian country, and the Spanish Navy was sent to track down the formidable Algerine force of two ships of the line, which posed a significant threat to any Christian vessels in the region. When the fleets sighted each other on November 28, 1751, they found that they were evenly matched with their opposition; both fielded two ships of the line.

The Spanish navy had been put to sea in the aftermath of the War of the Austrian Succession to ensure that they remained an experienced force. Pedro Fitz-James Stuart sighted the Algerine corsairs off Cape St. Vincent on the coast of Portugal, and moved to engage the two corsairs before they could escape. The Algerine ships, led by Mohammed Chirif commanding the flagship of the Algerine fleet, opened fire on the Spanish ship first, initiating the engagement. However, they then tried to escape back to a safe port, reasoning that they were no match for the trained Spanish crews. The Spanish set their sails in pursuit, and caught up to the Algerine flagship, the Danzik, while the other warship, the Castillo Nuevo, took the opportunity to flee and successfully made it back to a safe port. Fitz-James Stuart's ship, the Dragón, engaged the Danzik over the course of two days, eventually disabling her after heavy fighting. The heavily damaged corsair was removed of the crew and Christian slaves held in the hold before set on fire, as it was too weak to make it back to port. Fitz-James Stuart returned to Spain to applause and recognition from the Spanish Navy.

== Background ==
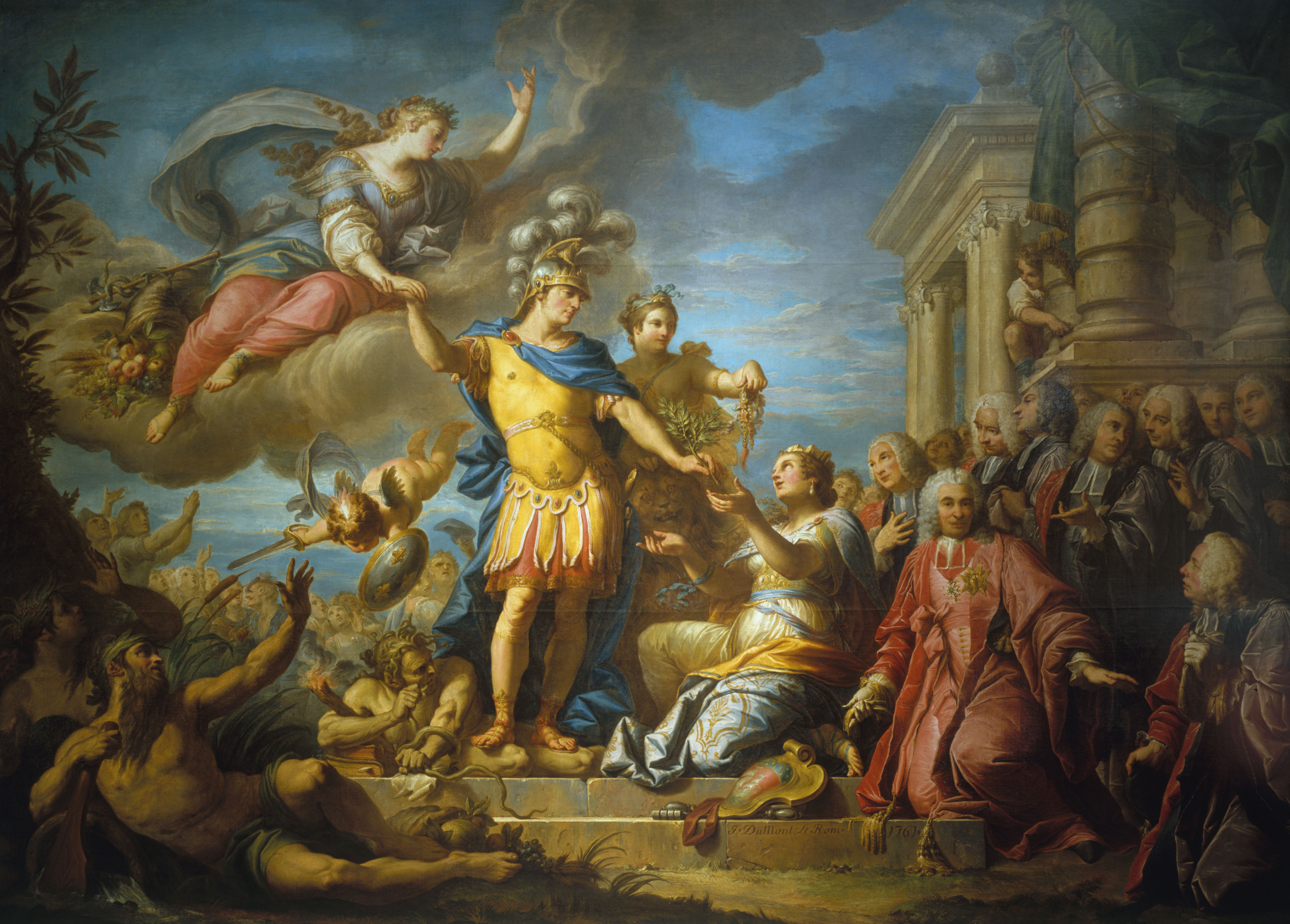
The Treaty of Aix-la-Chapelle ended the War of the Austrian Succession.

Europe had been embroiled in war since the War of the Austrian Succession, a complex and global conflict occurring over who would succeed the deceased Holy Roman Emperor, Charles VI. Although Charles spent his entire life trying to ensure that his daughter, Maria Theresa, would succeed him as rule of the Hapsburg dominions, many nations in Europe refused to accept the ascension. Despite this, she was able to defend her territory and in the Treaty of Aix-la-Chapelle, managed to secure recognition from the states that had opposed her as Queen of the Habsburg dominions. Spain had involved herself in the war, and its navy had engaged in several battles with the British, such as the engagement off Havana. Thus, the Spanish fleets were crewed with experienced sailors, a valuable advantage for any future conflicts Spain found herself in. After the peace treaty was signed, Spain was freed from any potential threat from other European powers. However, the naval administration of Spain was keenly aware that the Spanish fleets needed to put to sea and engage in combat to ensure they retained their experience for the coming years.

The Barbary corsairs had long plagued Christian countries, plundering their ships and enslaving their crews. Many daring corsairs even raided coastal villages and kidnapped villagers to sell into slavery. This formed a significant part of the economies of the Barbary states, which were autonomous vassals of the Ottoman Empire. Spain was resolved to end this threat to them by any means necessary, and the Marquis of Ensenada was ordered to assemble two naval divisions with the aim of engaging with the Barbary corsairs and to prevent the sailors of the Spanish fleet from remaining inactive and losing any experience they had gained from the war. Both divisions were dispatched to patrol the Barbary coast, where Barbary galliots and other minor warships were frequently captured by the Spanish, but no significant engagement took place before November 1751. Around the same time, two Algerine corsairs sailed around the Iberian Peninsula to carry out commerce raiding on Christian ships, posing a threat to the maritime trade of Spain. Before the two fleets encountered each other, the two corsairs had already captured several Christian merchant ships, enslaving any of those they did not kill.

== Battle ==
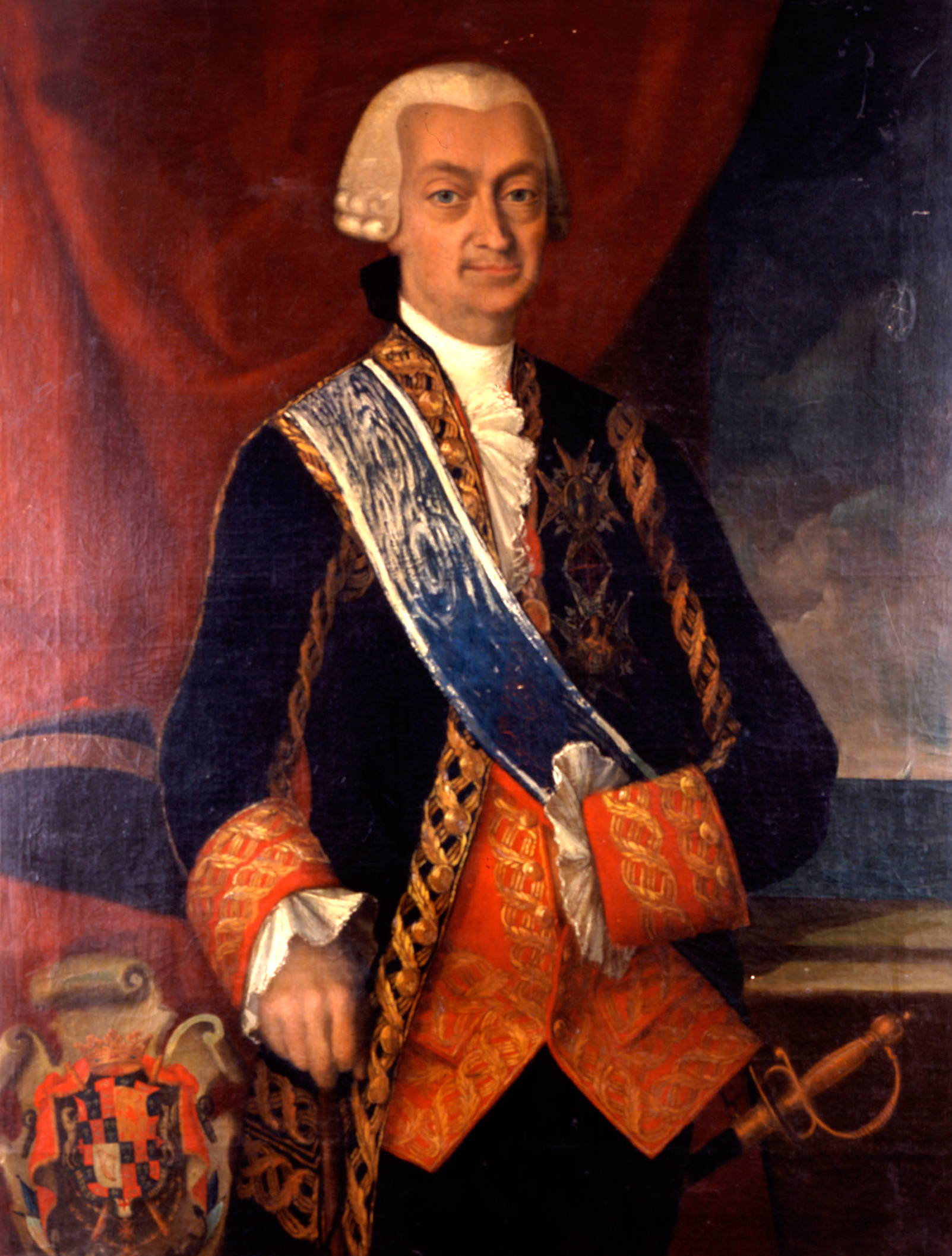
A painting of Pedro Fitz-James Stuart, painted by an unknown author.

On 28 November, Spanish captain Pedro Fitz-James Stuart had been ordered to undergo a cruise around the coast of Spain. Fitz-James Stuart, a member of the Scottish diaspora, had been searching for two Barbary ships of the line which had recently been sighted off the Spanish coast, harassing merchant shipping in the region. In command of the 60-gun ships of the line Dragón along with the América which was commanded by Luis de Córdova y Córdova, Fitz-James Stuart sighted two corsairs which appeared to belong to the Regency of Algiers fifty-two leagues off the Cape. These were the 60-gun Danzik, which happened to be flagship of the Algerine fleet and under command of Barbary corsair Mohammed Chirif, and the 54-gun Castillo Nuevo. Fitz-James Stuart sailed towards the two ships to ascertain their nationality, and by 5 p.m had closed with the two corsairs. The Danzik suddenly raised the Algerine colours and unleashed a furious cannonade upon the Dragón, and then almost immediately set sail and tried to evade the two Spanish warships. It was clear that the Algerines knew they were outmatched and thus attempted to resort to such underhanded tactics to try and evade capture. After this, Chirif ordered his ships to start sailing towards the south-west, although with the Dragón and América in hot pursuit.

The pursuit took place over two days, with the Castillo Nuevo, itself a captured Spanish ship of the line, managing to split course from the Danzik and evade their Spanish pursuers. Fitz-James Stuart ordered his ships to disregard the Castillo Nuevo and continue their pursuit of the Danzik. Chirif was successfully able to avoid taking cannon fire from the Spanish by sailing windward, which prevented the Spanish ships from opening the ports of their gundecks. Despite this, the Spanish ships were able to fire their bowsprit cannons at the Danzik, which suffered damage to her rigging and sails, forcing her to slow down until the Spanish ships were close enough to board. For a brief moment, she struck her colours, but Chirif, urged on by his crew, ordered it to be hoisted again and resumed the action until the sunset, when both himself and Stuart declined to continue fighting due to rough sea. The next day the Spanish warships attacked again, and in the ensuing conflict a duel emerged between the Dragón and the Danzik. This inflicted heavy casualties upon the Danzik and caused significant damage to the ship. Finally, seeing no other option, Chirif lowered his colours again and surrendered for the second and last time. Fitz-James Stuart sent men on board the ship to take possession of it. The losses on the Spanish side was negligible, amounting to be only 3 killed and 25 wounded, compared to 194 killed and about 90 wounded on the Algerine ship. The Danzik, severely damaged, had to be set on fire after 320 prisoners-of-war were transferred aboard Stuart's flagship, among them Chirif, wounded during the battle, and 50 rescued Christian slaves, who were mostly Dutch sailors.

== Aftermath ==
The Spanish ships returned to port with Fitz-James Stuart receiving applause and recognition from the Spanish Navy. The Dutch slaves were allowed to return to the Dutch Republic, and the crews of the two Spanish warships received their prize money from valuables taken from the Danzik. The Castillo Nuevo, returning to the Barbary states safe and sound, continued its career preying on Christian ships. Despite this defeat, which was followed by other Spanish victories over the Barbary corsairs such as the sinking of three xebecs off Benidorm and the destruction of the Castillo Nuevo seven years later, the Barbary corsairs continued to threaten and harass Spanish merchant ships. In 1775, the King of Spain, Charles III ordered Alejandro O'Reilly to strike a major blow to the Dey of Algiers by capturing the port of Algiers, a major center of the Barbary slave trade. The expedition, although assembling 20,000 men and 74 warships, failed miserably, and was unable to move the position of the various Deys in regards to their approval of the enslavement of Christians. Despite this defeat, Charles never gave up his ambition to put an end to the Barbary threat to his nation.

In 1783, Charles ordered Admiral Antonio Barceló to bombard Algiers, as it was commonly perceived that the humiliating defeat of the expedition eight years earlier had "offended the national pride of Spain". On his first bombardment, both the Spanish and the Algerines fruitlessly attempted to bombard each other, inflicting insignificant casualties on both sides. Barceló, citing unfavorable weather conditions, gave the order for his ships to withdraw. The Spanish court was furious at the failure of Barceló, but this only increased the desire of Charles to inflict a defeat on the Algerines. Charles sent an emissary to the Sublime Porte in Istanbul to try and diplomatically put an end to the activities of the Barbary corsairs, but the Dey refused to listen to the agreement, making Charles realize that war would be the only path. On 12 July 1784, a massive allied fleet consisting of warships from Spain, the Two Sicilies, Portugal and the Order of Saint John inflicted a decisive defeat on the Barbary corsairs, destroying the fortifications of Algiers and inflicting heavy casualties. The Dey's forces weakened to the point where they could put up little resistance, the Regency of Algiers was forced to negotiate a peace with the Spanish by which it was forced to cease large-scale piracy, signalling the effective end to the activities of the Barbary corsairs until the outbreak of the Napoleonic Wars.

== Order of battle ==
Ship	Commander	Navy	Guns	Casualties		
Ship	Commander	Navy	Guns	Killed	Wounded	Total
Dragón	Captain Pedro Fitz-James Stuart		60	3	25	28
América	Captain Luis de Córdova y Córdova		60	0	0	0
Danzik (captured)	Corsair Mohammed Chirif (POW)	Ottoman Algiers	60	194	90	284
Castillo Nuevo (escaped)	Corsair Mahamud Rais	Ottoman Algiers	54	0	0	0

== See also ==
- Antonio Barceló
- Barbary corsairs
- Spanish Navy

== Bibliography ==
- Español Bouché, Luis (1999). New and old problems in the Succession of the Spanish Crown: Pragmatics of Carlos III on unequal marriages.. Hidalguía Editions. ISBN 9788489851139.
- Fernández Duro, Cesáreo (1895). The Spanish Navy from the union of the Kingdoms of Castile and Aragon.. Madrid Naval Museum. ISBN 9780270858273.
