= Fernando de Paul =

Chilean footballer (born 1991)

Fernando De Paul
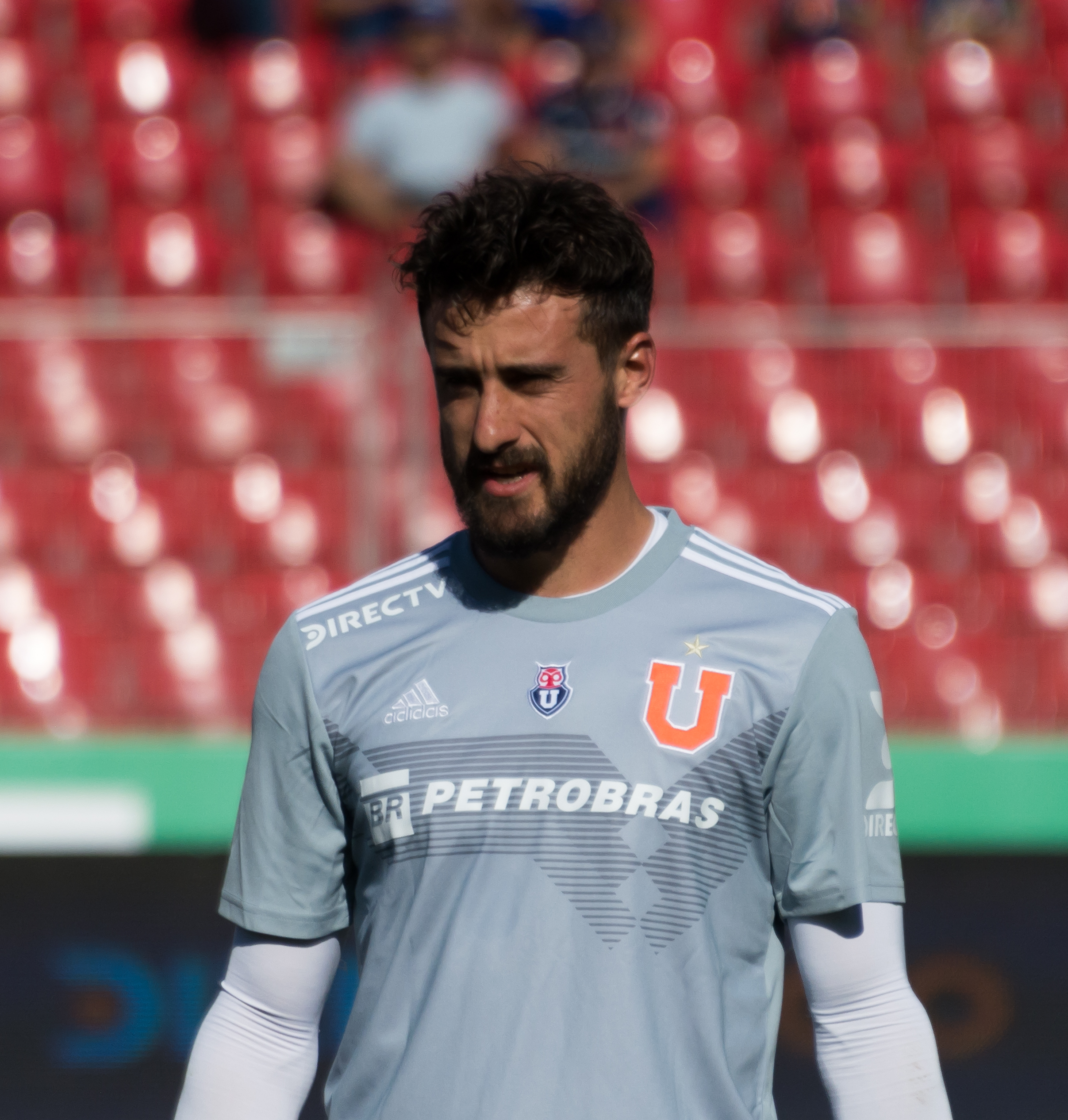
- De Paul with Universidad de Chile in 2020

Personal information
- Full name: Fernando Carlos De Paul Lanciotti
- Date of birth: 25 April 1991 (age 35)
- Place of birth: Álvarez, Argentina
- Height: 1.83 m (6 ft 0 in)
- Position: Goalkeeper

Team information
- Current team: Colo-Colo
- Number: 30

Youth career
- 2009–2011: San Luis de Quillota

Senior career*
Years	Team	Apps	(Gls)
2010–2016	San Luis de Quillota	138	(0)
2016–2021	Universidad de Chile	84	(0)
2022	Everton de Viña del Mar	27	(0)
2023–	Colo-Colo	20	(0)

International career
2018–	Chile	2	(0)
- * Club domestic league appearances and goals as of 21:25, 17 December 2020 (UTC).

Fernando Carlos de Paul Lanciotti (born 25 April 1991) is a professional footballer who plays as a goalkeeper for Chilean Primera División club Colo-Colo. Born in Argentina, he has played for the Chile national team.

== Biography ==
At the age of 17 he made the decision to go to live in Chile with the ambition of playing professionally. He arrived in Chile through two representatives who are Pablo Tallarico and Clemente, who were the same that at the time brought Diego Osella and many players who achieved the promotion in 2009. He obtained the Chilean nationality in his passage through San Luis de Quillota.

== Club career ==
As a child he started playing as a midfielder in his native Alvarez, although he lasted only a year in that position. The next season he began to try luck as a goalkeeper.

He made his professional debut in 2010 playing for San Luis de Quillota, when he was only 19, in a match against Huachipato, replacing the suspended Luciano Palos. The following year he would play more games, both in the First B and in the Chile Cup. In 2012, he would grab the starter's jersey in the Quillotano team, having outstanding participation in the fight for the promotion in the season 2013/14 (losing in the final phase against Barnechea), fact that would finally achieve a year later. His good campaign in the 2014/15 tournament attracted the interest of the University of Chile. The transfer to the university club became official on 7 July 2016.

== International career ==
A naturalized Chilean since 2016, de Paul received his first call-up to the Chile national team under Reinaldo Rueda for the friendly matches in October 2018. He made his debut in the first match against Peru on 12 October.

He made a second appearance against South Korea on 6 June 2022.

== Personal life ==
De Paul is a naturalized Chilean by residence since June 2016.

He is nicknamed Tuto.

== Honours ==
San Luis de Quillota

- Primera B de Chile (1): 2014–15

Universidad de Chile

- Primera División de Chile (1): 2017–C
