= José Valdiviezo =

Argentine footballer

Personal information
- Full name: José Antonio Valdiviezo
- Date of birth: October 7, 1970 (age 56)
- Place of birth: Tartagal, Salta, Argentina
- Height: 1.85 m (6 ft 1 in)
- Position: Goalkeeper

Team information
- Current team: Gimnasia y Tiro de Salta

Senior career*
Years	Team	Apps	(Gls)
1995–1999	Juventud Antoniana	241 total	(0)
1999–2001	San Lorenzo	2	(0)
2001–2005	Juventud Antoniana	(see above)	
2006–2008	Gimnasia de Jujuy	66	(0)
2008–2009	Atlético Tucumán	1	(0)
2009–2012	Gimnasia y Tiro	0	(0)
- * Club domestic league appearances and goals as of 14 July 2009

José Antonio Valdiviezo (born January 7, 1970, in Tartagal, Salta) is an Argentine retired football goalkeeper.

== Career ==
Valdiviezo has spent most of his career playing for his hometown club Juventud Antoniana in the lower leagues of Argentine football, but he was also part of the San Lorenzo squad that won the Clausura 2001 championship during his spell at the club. However, he only played two games for San Lorenzo in the Argentine Primera (none in the Clausura 2001) and two games in the Copa Libertadores.

In 2006 Valdiviezo joined Gimnasia y Esgrima de Jujuy and quickly replaced Luciano Palos as the club's first choice goalkeeper. Nonetheless, during the 2007–08 season he was relegated by Nereo Fernández.
