= Anthony Lyons =

British property investor

- Born: June 1967 (age 58)
- Occupation: Property investor

Anthony Lyons (born June 1967) is a British property investor. He is the co-founder of Matterhorn Capital and chairman of Future Energy Solutions.

== Early life ==
Lyons was born in June 1967.

== Career ==
With Simon Conway, Lyons co-founded Matterhorn Capital, a property investment company.

In 2004, Lyons and Conway purchased properties in Earl's Court and Olympia for £245 million. They sold them to Liberty International for £380 million in 2007.

With Conway and Brett Palos, Lyons purchased the O2 Centre in 2009.

Lyons and Conway invested £250 million in two data centres located in Bury Green, Hertfordshire and Chesham, Buckinghamshire.

Lyons also owns properties through St James Capital.

As of 2017, Lyons ran a US operation offering lighting solutions to clients including BP, Ferrari, Ford and Shell.

Lyons joined Future Energy Solutions as a partner in 2012, which operates across America and Europe. Its clients include Ford, BP, NCP and hotel chains such as Best Western.

== Personal life ==
Lyons previously resided in a mansion in Hampstead, London, which he sold for £43 million in 2010. He later moved to The Bahamas.
