= Retail Trust =

Charity based in London

- Formation: 1832; 194 years ago
- Type: Registered charity
- Legal status: Company Limited by Guarantee
- Headquarters: London
- Location: United Kingdom
- Region served: Great Britain
- Official language: English
- Staff: approx. 165
- Website: www.retailtrust.org.uk

The Retail Trust is a registered charity based in North London which aims to support those working and retired from the retail industry in the United Kingdom. The charity runs a helpline and several retirement estates in England and Scotland, as well as providing educational bursaries and hardship grants.

== History ==
Retail TRUST was founded in 1832 by Thomas Helps, as The Linen and Woollen Drapers, Silk Mercers, Lacemen, Haberdashers and Hosiers' Institution. Initially it was a "confederacy of good feeling" with close links to the emerging department store sector. In 1898, an estate in Mill Hill was donated to the charity, which became the first retirement estate for aged retail workers and it changed its name to The Cottage Homes Charity. Queen Elizabeth II became a patron in 1948. Two more retirement estates were acquired in 1956 and 1960, in Derby and Glasgow respectively.

In 1996, Cottage Homes launched its Helpline, which shifted the focus of the charity to current retail workers. In 2002, the charity adopted the present name and opened a fourth retirement home in Liverpool. A fifth retirement estate was opened in 2009 in Salford.

In 2001, it became a private company limited by guarantee and not having share capital, registered under the Companies Act 1985, with exemption from use of the limited suffix.

== Events ==
Traditionally Retail TRUST's fundraising initiatives focused on high-profile gala events, such as the London Ball, the Great Northern Ball and the Grand Scottish Ball. The first London Ball was held in 1952. The annual ball has become one of the most prestigious events in the retail calendar. It is regularly attended by retail giants, such as Sir Stuart Rose and Sir Philip Green as well as celebrities e.g. Caprice The Ball has been hosted by several household names, including Ruby Wax and Jimmy Carr.

Retail TRUST also launched a talent competition in 2009 called Search for a Star.

== Retail CU ==
Retail Credit Union Limited, trading as Retail CU, is a savings and loans co-operative launched in 2017. In 2013, retailTRUST identified mounting concerns among retailers about the number of employees reporting financial difficulties, prompting the establishment of a credit union for retail. It is authorised by the Prudential Regulation Authority and regulated by the Financial Conduct Authority and the PRA. Ultimately, like the banks and building societies, members’ savings are protected against business failure by the Financial Services Compensation Scheme.

== See also ==
- Credit unions in the United Kingdom
