= Spanish ship Galicia (1750) =

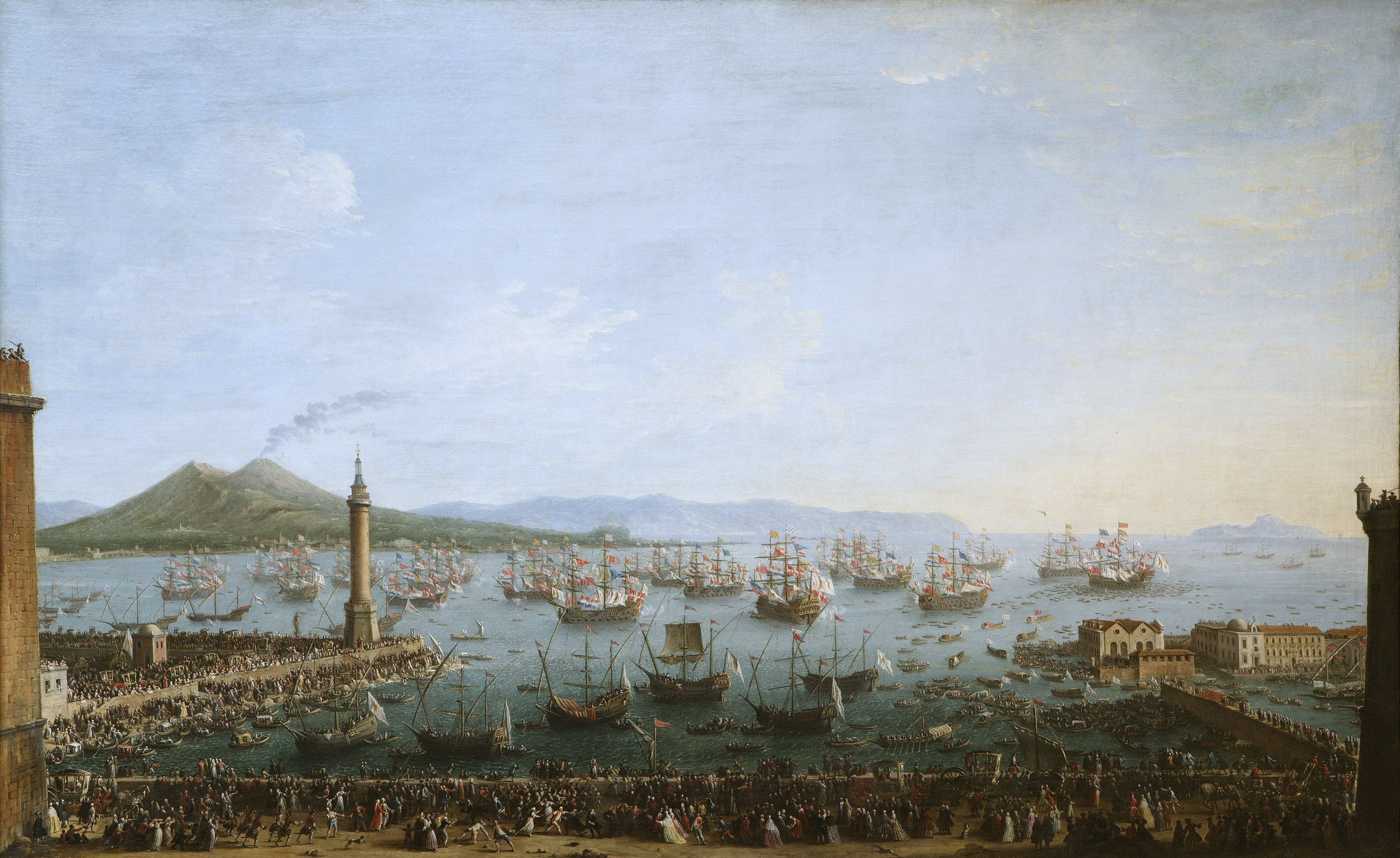
- Painting depicting the departure of Charles III of Spain from Naples in 1759, in which Galicia took part

History

Spanish Empire
- Name: Galicia
- Namesake: Galicia, Spain
- Builder: Havana Shipyard
- Laid down: 11 April 1749
- Launched: 3 August 1750
- Commissioned: 15 August 1751
- Maiden voyage: Havana to Cartagena de Indias
- In service: 1750-1797
- Out of service: 1797
- Refit: 1793
- Stricken: 1797
- Homeport: Cádiz
- Nickname(s): "Santiago El Mayor"
- Fate: Broken up in 1797

General characteristics
- Class & type: Ship of the line
- Tons burthen: 2,771 bm
- Length: 185 Burgos feet 9 Burgos inches (Gundeck) and 156 Burgos feet 3 Burgos inches (Keel)
- Beam: 55 Burgos feet
- Draught: 27 Burgos feet 2 Burgos inches
- Depth of hold: 24 Burgos feet
- Decks: 2
- Propulsion: Sail
- Armament: 70-74 guns - 24 pounders, 30 18 pounders and 18 8 pounders

Galicia was a 70-gun ship of the line of the Spanish Navy. Commissioned in 1751, she was decommissioned and broken up in 1797.

== Commission and construction ==
The name Galicia is a reference to the region of Galicia in Spain's northwest. Galicia was one of a class of three 70-gun ships ordered in 1748 to a specification laid down by Ciprian Autran, and was designed and built at Havana by Pedro de Torres. She was laid down on 11 April 1749 and launched on 3 August 1750. She and her sisters Infante and Princesa were commissioned together on 15 August 1751, and left Havana (together with the equally new 80-gun Rayo) on 1 March 1752 as a squadron under the overall command of Jefe de escuadra Francisco Ponce de Leon, arriving at Cadiz on 30 April.

== Service ==
In 1751, under the command of Luis de Velasco, Galicia left Havana with Infante and Princesa sailing to Cartagena de Indias. Once loaded at Cartagena de Indias, the ships proceeded in a convoy of the Flota de Tierra Firme back to Havana. On 1 March 1752, Galicia left Havana together with Infante, Princesa and Rayo, all arriving at Cádiz on 30 April of the same year. In 1754, Galicia transported a shipment of heavy guns from Barcelona to Cartagena.

In 1759, Galicia was at Cartagena. Later that year, after the death of King Fernando VI of Spain, a fleet of 36 ships was assembled at Cartagena under the command of the Juan José de Navarro Viana y Búfalo, the 1st Marqués de la Victoria of the flagship El Fénix. The fleet was tasked with picking up King Carlos III of Spain and his family from Naples to bring them to Barcelona, leaving Cartagena on 19 August 1759 and arriving at Naples in September. General and Vice Admiral Don Pedro Fitz-James Stuart served as the commander of one of the fleet's divisions with the 70-gun Galicia as his flagship. Galicia's captain was for the voyage was Juan Antonio de la Colina Rasines. The squadron was captained by Major General Joaquín de Aguirre and consisted also of the ships Terrible (74), Atlante (74) and Soberano (74). The fleet arrived at Barcelona on 15 December 1759 whereupon Pedro Fitz-James Stuart was named as Primer Caballerizo del Rey.

In March 1760, Galicia was at Cartagena. In 1761, Galicia left Cartagena bound for Mallorca for the purpose of recruiting sailors. After successfully recruiting seamen, the ship returned to Cartagena where the recruits were distributed amongst Galicia, Soberano (74), Terrible (74), and Aquilón (64). In November 1761, the minister Julián de Arriaga of the Audiencia Real de Sevilla ordered Gutierre de Hevia, Marqués del Real Transporte and commander of the Spanish fleet at Havana, to order Galiaga and Arrogante to Cuba to support operations against the British in the theater. On 20 November 1761, Galicia left Cádiz with destination for Santiago de Cuba, Hispaniola under the command of Captain Don José de Aguirre on a mission transporting 200 dragoons of the Regimiento de Dragones de Edimburgo (Edinburgh Dragoon Regiment) under the command of Colonel Carlos Caro. The troops would go on to take the field under Caro's command against British forces under Colonel Guy Carleton at Guanabacoa during the siege of Havana.

Galicia and Arrogante arrived at Santiago de Cuba on 31 January 1762 where the dragoons were offloaded. Galicia then took up defensive positions around Santiago de Cuba together with Arrogante (68) and Monarca (74) and the frigate Arrogante. During the siege of Havana, Galicia remained defending Santiago de Cuba together with Monarca, Arrogante and the frigate Palas (26).

On 31 July 1763, Galicia arrived at Havana from Santiago de Cuba escorting a convoy of eight merchantmen carrying 200 troops of the Granada and Murcia regiments together with three companies from the Aragón Regiment. Later the same year, Galicia took up a position escorting the Flota de Tierra Firme back to Cádiz. In 1764, Galicia was at Cádiz. The same year, she was careened and fitted with new rigging and masts at Arsenal de la Carraca near Cádiz. In 1765, under the command of Captain Don Juan de Soto, Galicia was assigned to the fleet under the command of Admiral Don Juan José de Navarro Viana y Búfalo, the 1st Marqués de la Victoria. The fleet was made up of Rayo, Arrogante, Triunfante, Atlante, Galicia, Princesa, Guerrero, Velasco, Poderoso, two chambequines and five minor vessels. The fleet sailed from Cádiz on 17 May. After briefly stopping at Cartagena, it sailed on to Genoa, arriving on 17 July to drop off the infanta Doña Luisa María Teresa de Parma, daughter of Felipe I de Parma and pick up the Princess Maria Luisa of Spain, daughter of King Carlos III. The fleet returned to Cartagena on 11 August where it dropped off the infanta Doña Luisa María Teresa de Parma and the Marques of la Victoria, Juan José de Navarro Viana y Búfalo. Command was then handed over to Admiral Don Luis de Córdova y Córdova. A smaller fleet was formed, sailing from Cartagena on 23 August, consisting of Rayo, Princesa and Guerrero which was tasked with escorting two tartans and a saetía back to Cádiz.

In 1779, Galicia was at Cádiz under the command of Captain Don Juan Clavijero attached to the observation squadron of the armada under the command of Admiral Don Luis de Córdova y Córdova. Galicia would remain with Córdova throughout the campaign and took part in the blockades of 1779–1782. In 1782, Galicia took part in the Battle of Cape Spartel where she saw heavy action, suffering 5 killed and 17 wounded. In 1793, Galicia was at Ferrol for refitting. She sailed from Ferrol the same year under the command of Captain Don Francisco Ruiz y Cárdenas as part of a squadron of six ships under the command of Commodore Francisco Javier Melgarejo to unite with the Spanish fleet at Cartagena under the command of Admiral Don Francisco de Borja y Poyo for the campaign in Sardinia. In 1794, Galicia, still attached to Commodore Francisco Javier Melgarejo's squadron was patrolling the waters off the Bay of Biscay. In 1797, due to a rotting hull for lack of careening, Galicia was scrapped.

== Commanders ==
Commanders of the Galicia
Commander	Commanded From	Commanded Until	Notes
Captain Don Luis de Velasco	1751	?	N/A
Captain Don Alvarez Cabreros	1754	?	N/A
Captain Don Juan Antonio de la Colina Rasines	1759	?	N/A
Captain Don José de Aguirre	1761	?	N/A
Captain Don Juan de Soto	1764	?	N/A
Captain Don Juan Clavijero	1779	?	N/A
Captain Don Francisco Ruiz y Cárdenas	1793	?	N/A

Flag Officers of the Galicia
Commander	Commanded From	Commanded Until	Notes
Admiral Don Joaquín de Aguirre y Oquendo	1759	?	Galicia served as flagship
Vice Admiral Don Pedro Fitz-James Stuart Colón Portugal y Castro	1759	?	Galicia served as flagship

== Bibliography ==
- "Galicia 70-74 Santiago El Mayor". 3decks.pbworks.com. 3 Decks.
- "Spanish Third Rate ship of the line 'Galicia' (1750)". threedecks.org. Three Decks. 2016.
- "Navío Galicia (2)". todoababor.es. Todo A Babor. 2003.
