= Porfirio Smerdou =

Mexican consul

Porfirio Smerdou Fleissner (Trieste, Kingdom of Italy, February 12, 1905 - El Escorial, Spain, May 11, 2002) was a Mexican politician and diplomat, godson of Porfirio Díaz, and honorary consul of Mexico in Eastern Andalusia and the Spanish Protectorate of Morocco at the outbreak of the Spanish Civil War. He is considered the Schindler of the Spanish war for having hidden almost six hundred people from both sides (mainly from the national side, in his property in Malaga, Villa Maya) during the warlike period.

== Biography ==
Smerdou's family had to leave Mexico once the Mexican Revolution broke out in 1910, moving to Brussels, the capital of Belgium, and later, to the Spanish cities of Seville and Málaga. In 1927 he married Concha Altolaguirre Bolín, sister of the poet Manuel Altolaguirre, of the Generación del 27. On January 1, 1931, once his father was retired as honorary consul of Mexico, he took up this position with jurisdiction in Eastern Andalusia and Spanish Protectorate of Morocco. He participated in numerous events to improve the image of the Mesoamerican country in Spain and other states. Due to this persistence, the Mexican government rewarded him by also naming him career vice consul.

At the beginning of the Spanish Civil War and the massacres of the red terror in Málaga, Smerdou takes advantage of his contacts and friendships, including the sincere collaboration of José Gálvez Ginachero, and manages to provide shelter in his private home, Villa Maya, to hundreds of Malaga militants of Carlism, Falangism and conservatism, whose lives were in danger. They reached more than 65 at the same time, in a fairly modest house and, in total, it is estimated that it protected more of 600 people.

Among the many curiosities of Villa Maya, which had its diary, its anthem and very rigorous protocols to avoid being discovered (which happened several times), was the arrival of supplies and news from Gibraltar through the yacht Honey bee by William Grice-Hutchinson, a British businessman established in Malaga who became known in the Rock as the Scarlet Pimpernel. Almost all of those who managed to escape did so on British destroyers, which were very difficult to board from the port of Malaga. In those seven months he managed to evacuate many Malaga residents from the city, on the way to Gibraltar, the French Morocco or Marseille, counting on the help of the ambulances that it would provide. the aforementioned José Gálvez. Furthermore, he convinced other Mexicans residing in the city to shelter more than 65 Spaniards and the Argentine consul gave him an abandoned consulate to house a larger number of people.

On December 19, 1936, the Mexican government terminated his duties, although this did not prevent him from continuing with his duties. After the entry into Malaga of the rebellious troops in 1937, and the persecution of the republican side began, Smerdou would also welcome six republican politicians who came to his aid, although he was not as successful as in the previous period of war.

After the war, for his humanitarian work for national refugees during the bombings, the military court number 1 of Malaga granted him Spanish nationality on April 1, 1940, and he was decorated by general Varela with the Cross of Military Merit first class with a white badge a year later. However, in 1946, the Franco authorities sentenced him to prison for having belonged to Freemasonry, although after proving that he had previously renounced the Order before Cardinal Giuseppe Pizzardo himself (who was prefect of the Sacred Congregation of the Holy Office of the Roman and Universal Inquisition), in the Vatican, the Council of Ministers absolved him of the sentence. The rest of his life was dedicated to the business world in Spain, Germany and Mexico, until his death in the year 2002.

== Legacy ==
Smerdou's entire archive was donated by himself to the José Ortega y Gasset Foundation, who has guarded it since then and can be consulted in its library. In the biography he wrote about Smerdou, Diego Carcedo baptized him as The Schindler of the Spanish Civil War. Carcedo had already studied another similar humanitarian character, Ángel Sanz Briz. The film director Gaby Beneroso has declared that he is planning a film about this character, titled The Passport of Smerdou. In March 2019, Villa Maya was demolished for lacking protection, to which a large part of the citizens reacted negatively. Given these comments, the mayor of Málaga, Francisco de la Torre, proposed that Smerdou receive the City Medal posthumously. In 2019, Smerdou's list was published. The refugees of Villa Maya. Málaga 1936-1937, by Félix Álvarez Martín.

== Trials about Porfirio Smerdou ==
Mexico was strongly linked to the Spanish Civil War, through famous humanitarian actions, such as the refuge granted in Mexican lands to thousands of Republicans, by the then president Lázaro Cárdenas, and other less known but equally exemplary events such as the humanitarian task carried out by the Consul of Mexico in Malaga, Porfirio Smerdou, in those fateful days. That small Mexican territory on Malaga soil known as "Villa Maya" became a refuge for the Spanish for many months... (Vicente Fox)

An honorary consul acting as an ambassador, a modest lodge apprentice showing off his newly released influences to achieve a single objective: saving lives. That is the case of Smerdou, about which there are more than 96 testimonies that are kept in the Ortega y Gasset Foundation and which has already been worthy of some articles and publications; That is the perfect example of how to save lives, to do good, the essential thing is the will of the person, what our parents and catechists called the right intention, the means being less than an anecdote. Porfirio Smerdou, thanks to his contacts and friendships with Freemasons and Republicans, saved the lives of some priests and some fascists. Porfirio Smerdou, thanks to his contacts with the Church and with the fascists, saved the lives of some Freemasons and some Republicans. Those are the facts. And although he does not need any tribute, - if evil is his own punishment, good is his own reward - we want with these lines to pay a small salute to his career, to his righteous actions. . (Luis Español)

== Sources ==
- Luis Español Bouché, Porfirio Smerdou (1905-2003): tribulaciones de un aprendiz masón en Málaga, Génesis, 2003, reproducido en Conde de Aranda: estudios a la luz de la Francmasonería, ISSN 1886-4813, Madrid, 2008, págs. 103-111
- Don Porfirio Smerdou, en la página web de los Antiguos Alumnos Maristas de Málaga
- Antonio Manuel Moral Roncal, "El asilo consular en Málaga (1936-1937), humanitarismo y diplomacia", Cuadernos Republicanos, N.º 50, 2002, Centro de Investigación y Estudios Republicanos
- Diego Carcedo, El Schindler de la Guerra Civil: la historia del diplomático mexicano que salvó a centenares de refugiados de ambos bandos, Barcelona, Ediciones B, 2003 ISBN 84-666-0865-6
- Antonio Nadal, Mi diario en villa Maya: los refugiados nacionalistas en el consulado mejicano de Málaga, julio 1936-febrero 1937, Málaga, Junta de Andalucía, 198?
- Antonio Manuel Moral Roncal, El asilo diplomático en la Guerra Civil Española, Madrid, Actas, 2001.
- Antonio Manuel Moral Roncal, "El asilo consular en Málaga (1936-1937): la gestión diplomática de Porfirio Smerdou", Jábega, Málaga, 91, 2002, pp. 271–294.
- Antonio Manuel Moral Roncal, Diplomacia, humanitarismo y espionaje en la Guerra Civil Española, Madrid, Biblioteca Nueva, 2008.
- Félix Álvarez Martín, La lista de Smerdou. Los refugiados de Villa Maya. Málaga 1936-1937 Málaga 2019, librería Proteo Málaga- Ediciones El Genal y Promotora Cultural Malagueña.

== Filmography ==
- La lista de Porfirio, 2019, dirigido por Miguel Ángel Hernández Arango, producción de Quinta planta con participación de Canal Sur Televisión. Documental sobre Porfirio Smerdou y villa Maya.
- Caleta Palace, 2023, dirigido por José Antonio Hergueta, producción de MLK con participación de Televisión Española y Canal Sur Televisión. Largometraje documental sobre los acontecimientos vividos en Málaga durante los primeros siete meses de Guerra Civil a través de testimonios de extranjeros que vivían o pasaron por la ciudad. Smerdou y Villa Maya son citados por Luis Antonio Bolín, interpretado por el actor Miguel Hermoso Arnao.
