= Lionheart (yacht) =

2016 megayacht

== 2016 - Lionheart ==
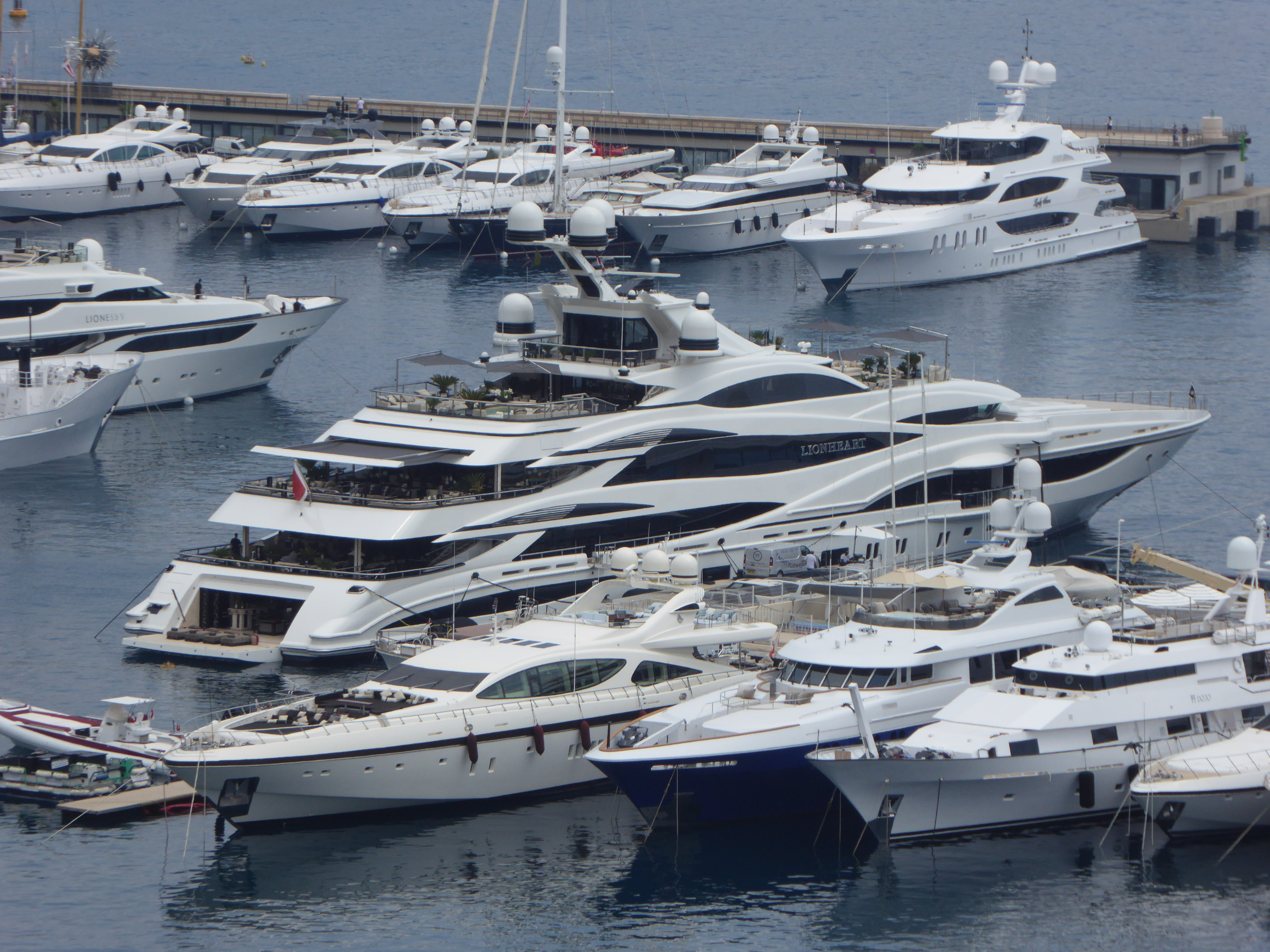
Lionheart in Monaco in 2017

The current 90-metre (300 ft) yacht, Lionheart, is the third yacht commissioned by Philip Green and built by Benetti Yachts (project FB262). Contracts were signed in 2012. The yacht has a steel hull and an aluminum superstructure. Completed in early 2016, Lionheart underwent sea trials off Livorno and embarked on a commissioning run to Malta in May. The Lionheart can cruise at a speed of 15 knots (28 km/h; 17 mph).

== 2006 - Lioness V ==
Originally built in 2006 by Benetti, the 63.5 metres (208 ft) yacht, formerly known as Lionheart, is now named Lioness V. It was designed and engineered by Stefano Natucci, with the interior designed by Argent Design. The yacht's length of under 65.0 meters (213.3 ft) allows it to be permanently docked in Monaco harbour, where the Greens reside. The yacht, which had a contract price of £32 million ($50 million), includes a steel hull and an aluminum superstructure. It can accommodate up to 12 guests in six rooms: a master suite, three double cabins, and two twin cabins. It can accommodate up to 19 crew members. The yacht is equipped with a fast Otam Cigarette 45-foot (14 m) tender named Lion Cub. Lioness V, still owned by Tina Green's company "Taveta Investments", is available for charter.

== 1999 - Lumiere ==
The 49.9-meter (164 ft) yacht, formerly known as Lionheart and now named Lumiere, was built in 1999 by Benetti. It was designed and engineered by Stefano Natucci, with the interior designed by Argent Design. The yacht can accommodate up to 12 guests in six rooms: a master suite, one VIP stateroom, two double cabins, and two twin cabins, which are convertible. Lumiere is capable of carrying up to 11 crew members. Renamed Cuor di Leone after being replaced by Green in 2006, it was subsequently sold and renamed Lumiere. The yacht is available for charter.

== Lionchase ==
Lionchase is a Mangusta 108, a fast sports yacht capable of reaching a top speed of 37 knots (69 km/h; 43 mph), with a list price of $12 million. Docked in Monaco, it serves as a fast tender to Lionheart.
