= Sulayman Reis =

Dutch corsair

Ivan de Veenboer
- Born: Unknown, est. 1560; Hoorn, Dutch Republic
- Died: 10 October 1620; Cartagena, Crown of Castile
- Piratical career
- Nickname: Sulayman Reis (having converted to Islam)
- Type: Corsair, pirate
- Allegiance: Ottoman Empire, Dey of Algiers
- Years active: c. 1607 – c. 1620
- Rank: Admiral
- Base of operations: Algiers
- Battles: Eighty Years' War; Battle of Cape Palos (1617)

Ivan Dirkie de Veenboer (died 10 October 1620 near Cartagena) was a 17th-century Dutch corsair. A privateer during the Eighty Years' War, he later turned to piracy and became an officer under Simon the Dancer. He later converted to Islam, becoming known as Süleyman Reis (also spelled Sulayman, Soliman, or Slemen Reis), and had a highly successful career as an Ottoman captain and Barbary corsair commanding the Algiers corsair fleet during his later years.

== Biography ==
Born in Hoorn, De Veenboer first came to prominence as a privateer for the Dutch Republic against the Spanish during the Eighty Years' War. He operated legally under a letter of marque from the Dutch Admiralty but left the service of the Republic after little success. He joined other former corsairs operating in North Africa, becoming an officer under Simon the Dancer sometime between 1606 and 1609. De Veenboer found far more success on the Barbary coast and, while in Algiers, he converted to Sunni Islam and changed his name to Sulayman. He was later given the title of Reis (or Admiral) while visiting the Sunni Caliphate's capital in Constantinople; by 1617 he was in command of his own fleet. He most often used the colours of Algiers, however, his crew were predominantly Dutch and always had the Dutch flag raised when attacking the Spanish.

He eventually wished to return to the Netherlands and attempted to negotiate with Dutch authorities through Wynant de Keyser van Bollandt, who was the Dutch consul in Algiers, to receive a pardon. Although he had stopped attacking Dutch shipping for the most part, taking care of the safe return of its crew when he did, an argument with de Keyser ended his hopes to be exonerated for his crimes.

In 1618, he was at the height of his power, commanding fifty warships in his fleet which were split into separate squadrons. Several future corsairs sailed in his fleet, most notably Jan Janszoon who worked as a steerer, and also converted to Islam. That same year, De Veenboer lost his position of leadership to Mustapha Reis. After battling with several merchant ships, involving five Dutch ships, one French and one Italian ship, Reis and another corsair captured two of the ships while the remainder were allowed to escape.

He decided to retire, capturing one last ship with a cargo of sugar, before settling in Algiers. His retirement lasted only a brief time however as, in early 1620, he sailed out from port capturing a rich French prize. While sailing off the coast in July of that year, he and four other ships were slowed by a dead calm and surprised by three Dutch men-of-war under Captains 't Hoen, Cleijnsorgh and Schaeff. He and two other ships managed to escape, although his flagship was heavily damaged. He managed to make his way to Algiers in August and, after a month in port undergoing repairs, he once again left Algiers with eight ships under his command. He and his small fleet were at sea for over two months before encountering a naval squadron of one Dutch, two French, and two English warships on 10 October 1620. De Veenboer decided to engage them and, after a long battle at the Cartagena harbour, was killed after being struck by a cannonball shattering both his legs. A sloop containing his corpse was returned to shore by his enemies.
