= Spanish ship Infante (1750) =

Ship of the line of the Spanish Navy

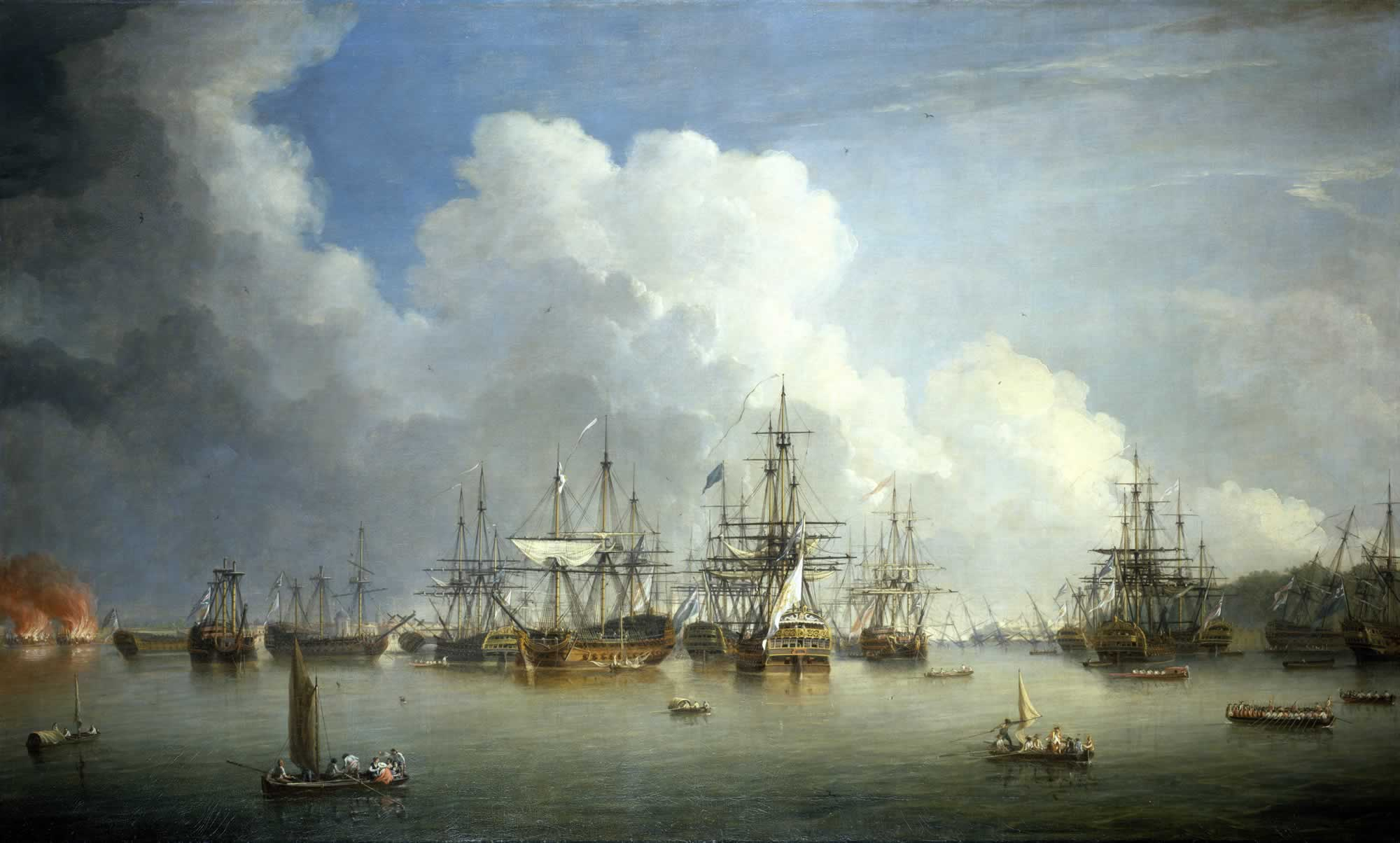
- Painting by Dominic Serres depicting captured Spanish warships at Havana; Infante is possibly among them

History

Spain
- Name: Infante
- Builder: Havana
- Laid down: 3 June 1748
- Launched: 20 June 1750
- Commissioned: 15 August 1751
- Captured: 13 August 1762, by Royal Navy

Great Britain
- Name: HMS Infanta
- Acquired: 13 August 1762
- Fate: Sold, 1775

General characteristics
- Class & type: Ship of the line
- Tons burthen: 1918 tons
- Length: 171 ft 6 in (52.3 m) (gundeck)
- Beam: 51 ft 3 in (15.6 m)
- Depth of hold: 22 ft 7 in (6.9 m)
- Propulsion: Sails
- Sail plan: Full-rigged ship
- Armament: 70 guns of various weights of shot

Infante was a 70-gun ship of the line of the Spanish Navy. She was one of a class of three ships ordered in 1748 to the specification laid down by Ciprian Autran, and was designed and built at Havana by Pedro de Torres. Infante was laid down on 3 June 1748 and launched on 20 June 1750. She and her sister ships Galicia and Princesa were commissioned on 15 August 1751, and left Havana with the 80-gun Rayo on 1 March 1752 as a squadron under the overall command of Squadron Commander Francisco Ponce de Leon, arriving at Cádiz on 30 April. During the Siege of Havana, she was captured by the British on 13 August 1762, and commissioned into the Royal Navy as the third-rate HMS Infanta. She was decommissioned and sold in 1775.
