= Spanish ship Princesa (1750) =

Spanish ship of the line

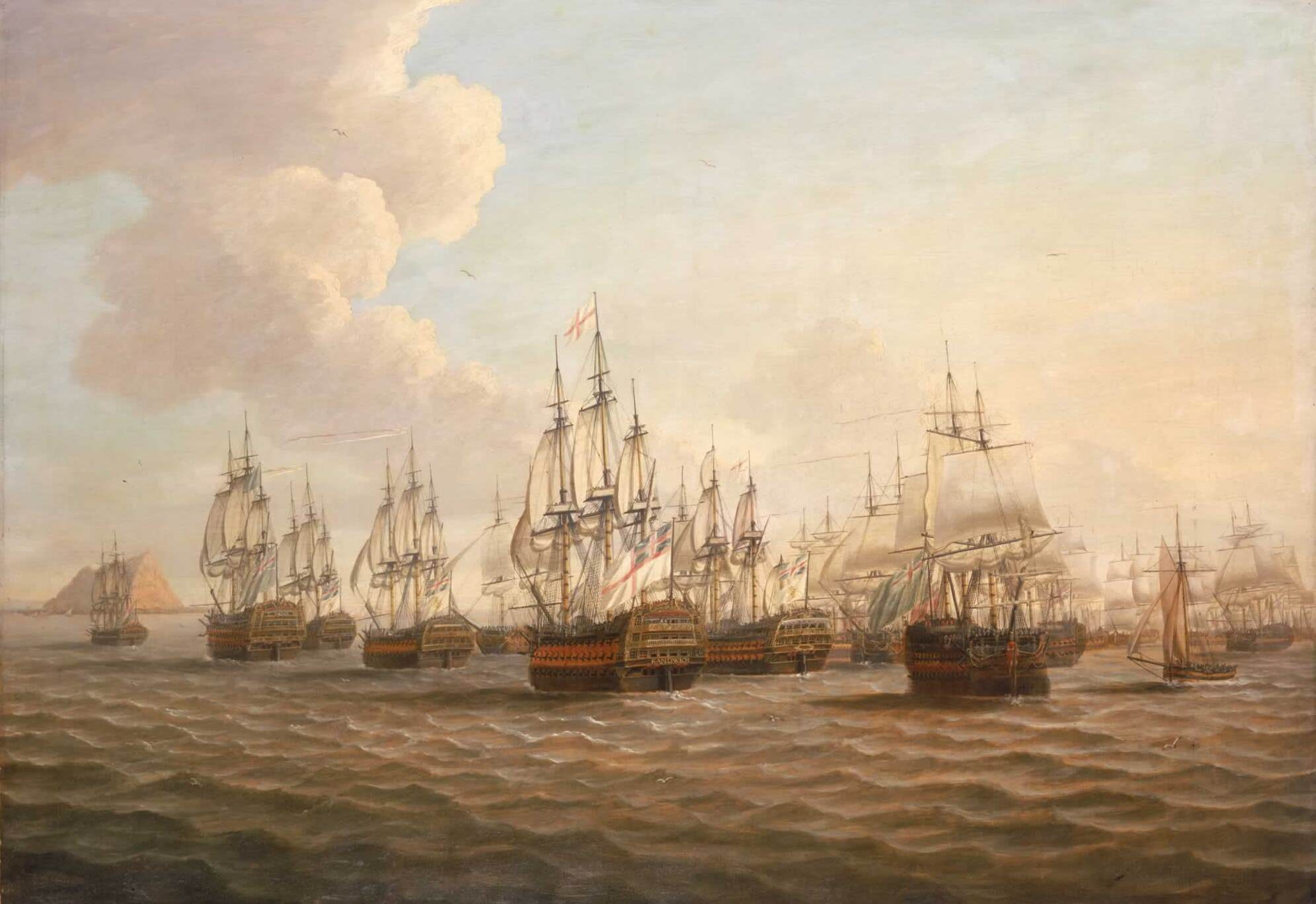
- Princesa after the Battle of Cape St Vincent

History

Spain
- Name: Princesa
- Ordered: 1748
- Builder: Havana
- Laid down: 11 May 1748
- Launched: 15 September 1750
- Commissioned: 15 August 1751
- Captured: 16 January 1780, by Royal Navy

Great Britain
- Name: HMS Princessa
- Acquired: 16 January 1780
- Fate: Broken up, 1809

General characteristics
- Class & type: 70-gun third rate ship of the line
- Tons burthen: 1966
- Length: 170 ft 2½ in (51.9 m) (gundeck)
- Beam: 51 ft 2 in (15.6 m)
- Depth of hold: 22 ft 1 in (6.7 m)
- Propulsion: Sails
- Sail plan: Full-rigged ship
- Armament: 70 guns of various weights of shot

Princesa was a 70-gun ship of the line of the Spanish Navy. She was one of three ships ordered in 1748 to the specification laid down by Ciprian Autran and designed and built at Havana by Pedro de Torres. Princesa was laid down on 11 May 1748 and launched on 15 September 1750. She was commissioned along with her sister ships Infante and Galicia on 15 August 1751, and left Havana together with the 80-gun Rayo on 1 March 1752 as a squadron under the overall command of Squadron Commander Francisco Ponce de Leon, arriving at Cádiz on 30 April.

Princesa fought at the Battle of Cape St. Vincent on 16 January 1780, where she was captured by a Royal Navy squadron under the command of Admiral George Rodney. She was then recommissioned in England as the third-rate HMS Princessa. On 12 April 1782, she was the flagship of the Blue squadron at the Battle of the Saintes under Admiral Francis Samuel Drake. From 1784 onwards, Princessa was employed as a sheer hulk, and was broken up in 1809.
