= Battle of Cape Palos (1758) =

Spanish naval victory over Algiers

- Part of Spanish-Barbary Wars
Date	9 – 10 June 1758
Location	Between Cape Palos and the coast of Barbary, Mediterranean Sea 36.918607°N 0.527344°W
Result	Spanish victory

Belligerents
Spain	Regency of Algiers

Commanders and leaders
(Spain) Isidoro García del Postigo	Mahamud Rais (surrendered)

Strength
3 ships of the line	1 ship of the line 1 frigate

Casualties and losses
2 killed 12 wounded and some bruises	100+ killed 44 drowned 306 prisoners 1 ship of the line sunk 1 frigate damaged

The Battle of Cape Palos was a naval engagement that took place between 9 and 10 June 1758, during the Spanish-Barbary Wars. A Spanish squadron of three warships intercepted an Algerian squadron of two warships escorting a prize ship. After a prolonged fight, the Algiers flagship surrendered. His consort eluded the battle, but wrecked and the prize ship escaped. Algiers flagship sank from the damage, but there were several prisoners and Christian slaves released.

== Background ==
Since the 16th century, Barbary corsairs were a problem for the Christian countries of the Mediterranean and later the Atlantic, attacking their ships and coastal villages in the raids they made in search of slaves and merchandise. This formed a significant part of the economies of the Barbary states, which were autonomous vassals of the Ottoman Empire. For Spain, the corsairs of Algiers were a constant problem on the Spanish south coast and the Spanish Levante.

After the Treaty of Aachen of 1748, Spain entered peace and the Zenón de Somodevilla, 1st Marquis of Ensenada focused from that moment on the Barbary threat, in order to keep the Spanish Navy occupied. Two naval divisions were sent to constantly patrol the Barbary coast, managing to restrain the corsairs and keep the Spanish sailors active.

During these patrols, there were essentially minor engagements between light vessels, until in 1751 a battle occurred between two Spanish ships of the line and two Algerian ships of the line at Cape St Vincent. In that engagement, the Algerian flagship, called Danzik, was destroyed and her consort, called Castillo Nuevo, escaped, becoming the new flagship of Algiers. After this event, the Spanish continued cleaning the area of Algerian corsairs, taking place new minor engagements, until in 1758 another battle took place that involved large ships, among them the Castillo Nuevo. (Note: Barbary's corsairs generally used light vessels such as galiots, fustas and, later, xebecs. But from the 17th century they began to have ships comparable in power to the Europeans.)

== Battle ==
=== First day ===
On 2 June 1758, three Spanish ships left Cartagena under the command of Captain Isidoro García del Postigo to patrol the coast and drive away Algerian ships. They were 68-gun three ships of the line called Soberano, Vencedor and Héctor, commanded respectively by the Captain García del Postigo, Captain Francisco Tilly and Captain Fernando del Campillo. The head of the Spanish division was García del Postigo.

At eight o'clock in the morning of 9 June, near Cape Palos, the Spaniards spotted three suspicious ships and began the persecution to recognize them. At two in the afternoon, the Algerian prize ship, broke away and fled to the SSE, while Algerian warships turned north and hoisted the Algiers flag an hour later, ready to cover its withdrawal. These were the 60-gun ship of the line Castillo Nuevo (flagship) and the 40-gun frigate Caravela, commanded respectively by Arráez (Note: “Arráez” is the Moorish equivalent of commander.) Mahamud Rais and the turncoat Achí Mustafá. The Spaniards hoisted British flags on their ships to get close enough, although the trick was not useful due to the Algerian fighting attitude.

At half past four in the afternoon, the Spanish and Algerian ships were within walking distance, so the Spaniards hoisted their own flag on their ships and began the battle. Soon the Caravela separated from the Castillo Nuevo and began to escape, being persecuted by the Héctor. Battle was divided into two parts: the Soberano and Vencedor against the Castillo Nuevo, and the Héctor against the Caravela.

The Soberano and Vencedor were kept at a distance from the Castillo Nuevo, taking advantage of the greater range and firepower of their guns to attack it. However, that prolonged the battle due to the low impact power of the bullets (Note: In this period, the impact power of the projectiles was much lower, since the guns had a low ejection speed when firing.) and the obtuse resistance of the Algerians. The Spaniards first used bullet charges and then shrapnel so as not to inflict more damage on the hull of the Castillo Nuevo and be able to capture it. At eleven o'clock at night, the Algerian ship was completely dismantled, and at twelve o'clock the Spaniards stopped the attack to rest.

=== Second day ===
Finally, at one o'clock in the morning, Mahamud surrendered. At dawn, the Spaniards sent boats to evacuate the Algerian survivors from the ship, which was sinking inexorably due to the damage it received in battle. The Algerians had more than 100 killed in battle, 44 drowned and 306 prisoners; including Mahamud Rais and 3 officers. 53 Christian slaves (Dutch, German and one Irish) were released. The Spanish casualties between the two ships were scarce: 2 killed, 11 wounded and some bruises. According to the Spanish historian Fernández Duro, the few Spanish casualties are due to the mishandling of the guns by the corsairs.

On the other hand, Héctor had been chasing the Caravela until he reached the same coast of Barbary. From half past five in the afternoon he attacked her with his bow guns to stop her, while the frigate fled and responded to the attack. Soon the Algerian ship was dismantled and blocked against the coast, but at that time a squall of the NE appeared that forced the Spanish ship, with damage to the rigging, to separate from its opponent, without seeing it again. Héctor only had 1 wounded and some bruises.

When the three Spanish ships met, they began the search for the Caravela. The search extended until 12 June, when they found a shipwreck near Alhucemas, assuming their loss. As for the prize ship that escaped, the Spaniards discovered by information of the liberated that it was a Hamburg ship with a rich cargo that had been captured by the Algerians before, being the reason why the Algerian warships were sacrificed.

Spanish ships spent many munitions in battle because the shots were fired at a distance, but caused the dismantling of the Algerian ships. Spanish historian Rodríguez González considers it impossible that the frigate has survived after receiving so much damage. He also considers that despite the Spanish superiority, the victory achieved by García del Postigo is remarkable due to the few casualties and the good effect of the ranged attack, which justifies spending on ammunition. The historian attributes the same credit to the ship of the line when it chases a frigate, which is generally faster and more maneuverable.

== Aftermath ==
With this battle, the Spanish destroyed the third flagship of Algiers in the 18th century; the second had been the aforementioned Danzik in 1751, and the first, a 60-gun ship of the line destroyed in 1732. (Note: The first of these ships, that of 1732, was destroyed by Blas de Lezo in the Mostaganem cove, where it was anchored and guarded by Algerian coastal batteries.) Although this Spanish victory and others did not put an end to the raids of the Algerian corsairs, they began to decline in this period due to measures taken by the Spanish government to develop the navy and encourage the Spanish privateers.

Later, Charles III of Spain would seek to solve the problem with the Regency of Algiers, both through military and diplomatic channels. In 1775, he sent an expedition to Algiers which failed. In 1778 a negotiation failed and in 1782, Algiers did not adhere to the treaty between Spain and the Ottoman Empire. Faced with the refusal, Spain sent a new punitive expedition against Algiers in 1783 and then in 1784. In 1785, when another Spanish expedition was being prepared, Algiers decided to agree with the Spanish government, signing a treaty in 1786 that wiped out the corsairs.

== Sources ==
- Rodríguez González, Agustín Ramón (2001). "El gasto de municiones en la destrucción del Castillo Nuevo". Biblioteca Digital de la Universidad CEU San Pablo (in Spanish). Madrid, España: 761–765.
- Fernández Duro, Cesáreo (1900). Armada española desde la unión de los reinos de Castilla y Aragón (in Spanish). Vol. VI. Madrid, España: Instituto de Historia y Cultura Naval.
- Barrio Gozalo, Maximiliano (2003). "Los cautivos españoles en Argel durante el siglo ilustrado". Cuadernos Dieciochistas, Ediciones Universidad de Salamanca (in Spanish) (4). Salamanca, España: 135–174.
