= Tina Green =

British businesswoman (born 1949)

- Born: Cristina Stuart Paine; August 1949 (age 77); London, United Kingdom
- Occupation: Businesswoman
- Spouses: Robert Palos (m. 1967, divorced) Sir Philip Green (m. 1990)
- Children: 4, including Stasha and Brett Palos

Cristina Stuart Green, Lady Green (née Paine, formerly Palos; born August 1949), known as Tina Green, is an English businesswoman and interior designer. Green is the director of Taveta, the majority owner of Taveta Investments Ltd, the parent company of the Arcadia Group, of which her husband, Sir Philip Green, is chairman. The Arcadia Group owned the clothing retail chains Topshop and Topman, as well as Burton, Dorothy Perkins, Evans, Miss Selfridge, Outfit, and Wallis. Taveta owned British Homes Stores (BHS) before its 2015 sale. BHS was placed into administration in 2016, and the Arcadia Group was placed into administration in 2020. Green formed the interior design company Green & Mingarelli with the Italian designer Pietro Mingarelli.

Green was the recipient of a £1.2 billion dividend payment from the Arcadia Group in 2005, a record payment in British corporate history. In 2005 The Times stated that she was "for tax reasons the legal owner" of her and her husband's estimated wealth of £4.9 billion. In 2020, the couple's wealth was estimated at £930 million by the Sunday Times Rich List and at USD $1.4 billion by The World's Billionaires list published by Forbes in 2026.

== Early life and career ==
Cristina Stuart Paine was born in London in August 1949. Her father was a wine merchant; his business led to long periods living abroad and Green spent her childhood in Hong Kong, Japan and Thailand. Green did not finish school and described herself as "trained in nothing" but has said that she loves to "work and to graft". Green met Robert "Bobby" Palos, a South African jazz drummer in Hong Kong when she was 17 and he was 31. They married a year later in 1967 after travelling around Australia and Japan. Green initially worked in the diamond industry and subsequently moved to South Africa with Palos and the couple opened a fashion boutique in Johannesburg. Green and Palos had two children, Stasha (born 1972) and Brett (born 1974). Green's daughter, Stasha, subsequently described her mother's early career as having involved being "a diamond dealer, the first female DJ in Johannesburg [and] a go-go dancer" as well as dancing with The Beach Boys. Green and Palos later took their fashion boutique to London. Green described herself as more driven to succeed in business than Palos, and after 20 years together the couple divorced. They remained friends after their divorce and Green and Palos's second wife were at his bedside when he died.

She met businessman Philip Green in 1985 and described him as "Just an ordinary person with a seriously strong work ethic", who was "a colourful character" with "zero money". They married in 1990. The couple have two children, Chloe (born 1991) and Brandon (born 1993). Green designed clothing for her husband's clothing shops, including Lewis's and Owen Owen, and subsequently helped design the layout of the stores. Green's fashion boutique in London's Knightsbridge district, Harabels, closed in 1992.

Green, her husband Philip, and their children moved to Monaco in 1998, having previously lived on Avenue Road in London's St John's Wood district. Philip Green has said that the move was for health reasons. Tina Green said in a 2005 interview that the couple moved from St John's Wood to Monaco after Philip was the victim of a mugging by three men with a sword.

Green has organised several large parties for her husband Philip's 50th, 55th and 60th birthday parties. Philip's 50th birthday party took place in Cyprus and cost an estimated £5 million. The party featured performances from Earth, Wind & Fire, and the singers Tom Jones and Rod Stewart. His 55th birthday party was held in the Maldives at a cost of £20 million, with performances from Jennifer Lopez and George Michael. His 60th was held at the Rosewood Mayakoba resort in Mexico featuring performances from The Beach Boys, Robbie Williams and Stevie Wonder.

In 2012 Green ordered the superyacht Lionheart from the shipbuilders Benetti at an estimated cost of £100 million. Green was appointed treasurer to the private charitable foundation of Charlene, Princess of Monaco, in 2017.

In 2000, she bought £25 million of shares in the British retail company Marks & Spencer shortly before it was announced that Philip Green was considering a takeover of the company. Green was described as the "for tax reasons the legal owner" of her and her husband's estimated wealth of £4.9 billion by The Times in 2005. In 2020, the couple's wealth was estimated at £930 million by the Sunday Times Rich List and at $2.4 billion by The World's Billionaires list published by Forbes in 2021. Philip and Tina Green's net worth at its peak in 2007 was estimated to be £4.9 billion by the Sunday Times Rich List, it had declined to an estimated £930 million by 2020. Green has spoken of the British public's perceived resentment of her wealth saying in a 2005 interview that she thought that " ... unfortunately, in this country [the United Kingdom] there's a lot of jealousy. No one likes a winner, they just want the bad news. I just find it very sad". In a 2012 interview Green said that it had been " ... really scary. It scares me. Yes. Because it's been so ... difficult".

== Taveta and the Arcadia Group ==
Green is the director of Taveta Ltd which is the majority owner of Taveta Investments Ltd. Taveta Investments Ltd is the parent company of the Arcadia Group, of which Green's husband, Philip, is the chairman. Taveta Investments acquired the Arcadia Group for £770 million in 2004, by 2018 the group owned the clothing store chains of Topshop and Topman as well as Burton, Dorothy Perkins, Evans, Miss Selfridge, Outfit, and Wallis. In 2005 Tina Green was the recipient of a £1.2 billion dividend from Arcadia, the largest dividend in British corporate history. Green notably paid no British income tax on the dividend due to her residency in the tax haven of Monaco. The dividend was paid for by a loan taken out by Arcadia, cutting Arcadia's corporation tax as interest charges on the loan were offset against profits.

In August 2010 Philip Green said that "My wife's not a tax exile – my family do not live in the United Kingdom, it's somewhat different. We do pay all our tax in Britain. I think we have paid over the last five years some £300-400m in taxes on profits that have been made on our company". Philip Green has jocularly referred to his wife's income as "housekeeping money". In 2016 Green said that she or her family had controlling stakes in 11 companies, the majority of which were based in Jersey and the British Virgin Islands. Green said that the locations were chosen as they had strong regulatory and professional corporate regimes.

The British Home Stores (BHS) group was acquired by Taveta for £200 million in 2000. It was subsequently sold in 2015 for £1, and went into administration in 2016. BHS had a deficit in its pension schemes of £571 million at the time of its 2016 collapse and 11,000 jobs were put at risk. The shareholders of BHS including the Green family were the recipients of £580 million from the group during their tenure.

In 2016, Philip Green agreed to appear before a work and pensions select committee of the British House of Commons on condition that his wife was not called before the committee. As the largest shareholder of the Arcadia Group, in 2019 Green put £100 million over three years into the group's two pension schemes in a deal arranged with the Pensions Regulator. In 2019 Tina Green put £50 million into the Arcadia Group in exchange for rent reductions on clothing stores rented by the group from landlords. The Arcadia Group went into administration in November 2020. The group had struggled with several years of declining sales and the economic fallout of the COVID-19 pandemic in the United Kingdom. It was seen as having suffered from underinvestment in comparison to other retail companies and having failed to make as successful transition to online retail as its corporate rivals.

=== UK Uncut protests ===
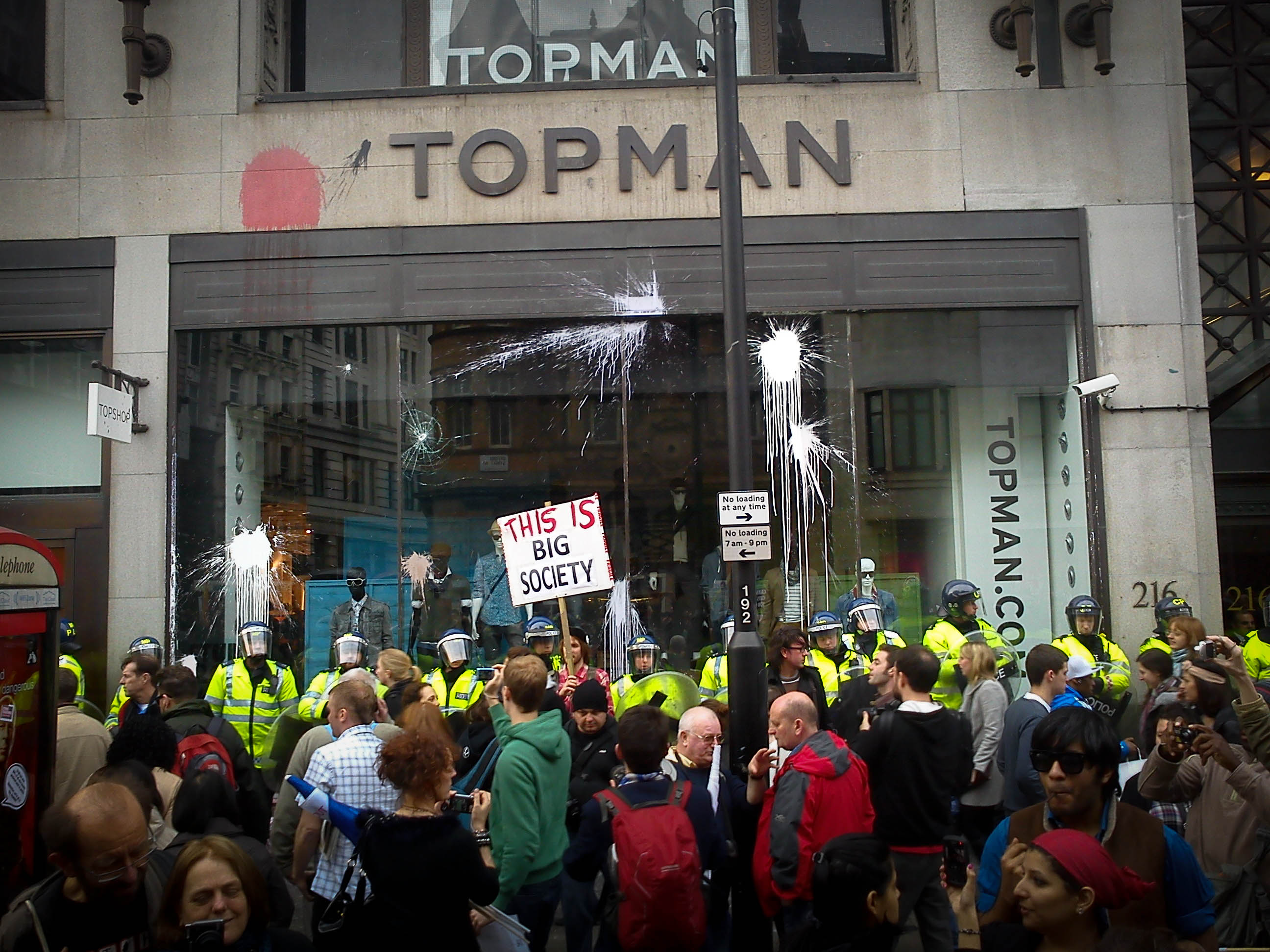
Protestors at Topshop's flagship store on London's Oxford Street in 2011

In 2010 the Greens became the subject of protests from the activist group UK Uncut for their alleged avoidance of corporate taxation. At the time of the protests the Conservative government under Prime Minister David Cameron was imposing austerity through cuts to government expenditure. The protestors claimed that the cuts could be avoided if corporate tax avoidance was eradicated. Philip Green had been appointed by Cameron as an advisor to the government on efficiency. The UK Uncut campaigners staged a sit-in at Arcadia's flagship London Topshop store in Oxford Street and glued themselves to the windows of Topshop in Brighton on 4 December 2010. The protestors also targeted Barclays, Boots, HSBC, and Vodafone stores.

== Green & Mingarelli ==
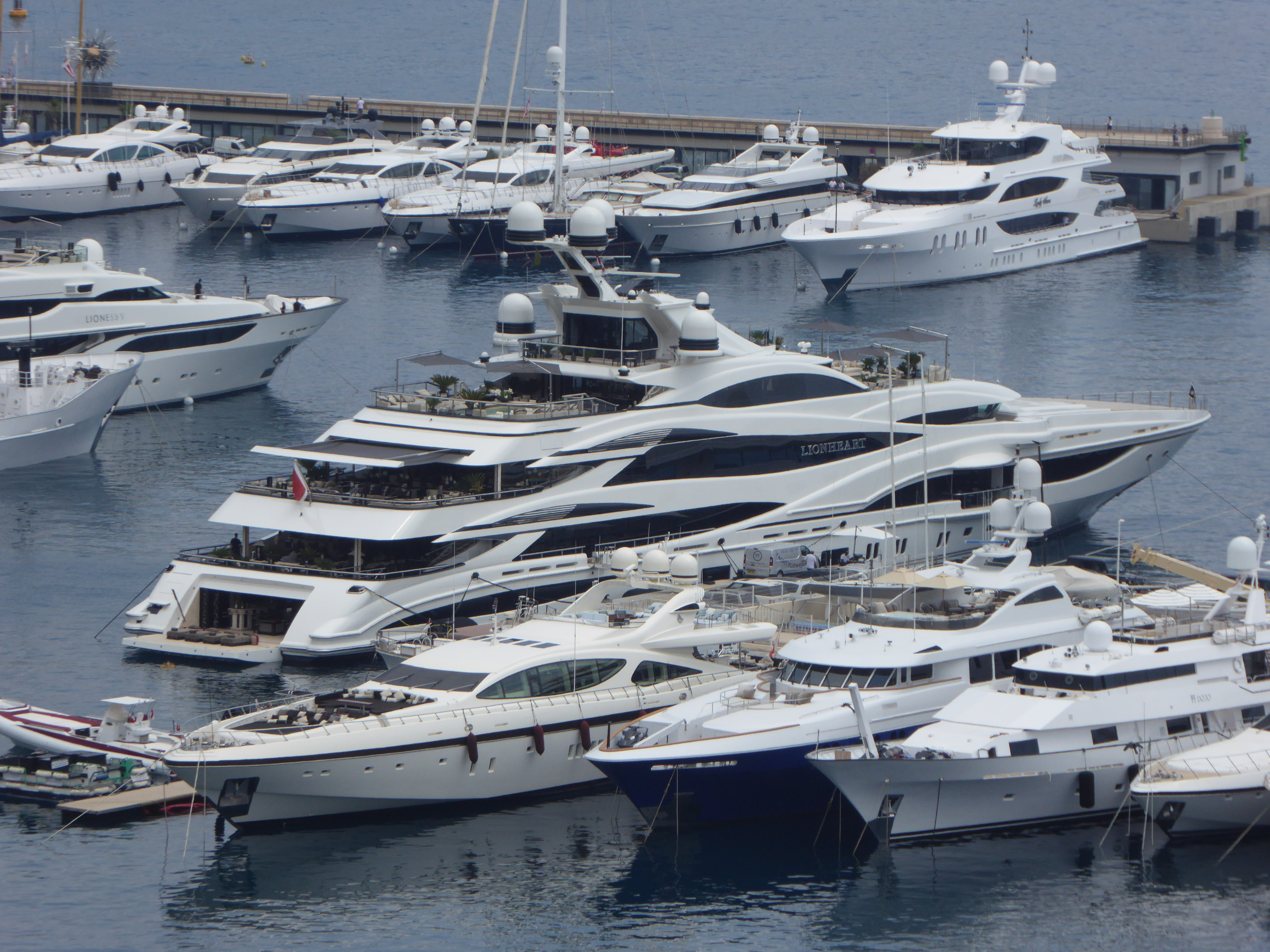
The Green's superyacht, Lionheart, in Monaco in 2017

Green formed the interior design company Green & Mingarelli with the Italian furniture designer Pietro Mingarelli, having met him on a yacht. The pair work up to 15 hour days when working on designs. The company has created interiors for private residences and yachts. Green's interior design work is noted for her extensive use of black and white. The company restored and designed the interior of a mews house in London's Belgravia district "almost entirely" in black and white.

Green extensively uses Lalique glass in her interior designs and helped create a homewear range for Lalique Maison in 2014. Mark Harrison, writing in The Times, described Green's Lalique range as "rather lovely; ornate, but not vulgar; terribly grand" and a "harmonious, genteel, upmarket non-riot of off-white, ebony, crystal and gold". Green herself described her Lalique work as "obviously high end, and obviously expensive". Green & Mingarelli came to the attention of the owner of Lalique, Silvio Denz, due to their extensive use of Lalique glass in the decoration of the 68.5m motor yacht Silver Angel, which led to their homeware commission. In their Lalique collection a sideboard was priced at €30,000 and a mirror at €10,000.

== Financial link with Richard Caring ==
Green has been linked financially to the British businessman Richard Caring, a close friend and business partner of her husband Philip Green. It was revealed in the Swiss Leaks that Green held the "vast majority of [Caring's] cash assets" on trust for him in her bank account with HSBC in Monaco. Green provided £23.5 million to Caring to help him purchase the restaurant chains Belgo and Strada from Luke Johnson. Green gifted the Silver Angel motor yacht, worth an estimated £25 million to Caring in 2017. In 2009 Caring had told the Evening Standard newspaper that he had just acquired the yacht but it was revealed in the Pandora Papers leak that it had been held in Green's name from 2009 to 2017. Silver Angel was decorated by Green's company, Green & Mingarelli in tones of white, cream and black. When Philip Green first saw the interior of the yacht he is said to have remarked to his wife "Are these the only fucking colours you can do? It's the same colour as our boat".

== Sources ==
- Shah, Oliver (2018). Damaged Goods: The Rise and Fall of Philip Green. London: Penguin Books. ISBN 978-0-24-134124-7.
