= Luis Español =

Franco-Spanish writer and translator

Luis Español Bouché (Madrid, 1964) is a Franco-Spanish writer and translator, author of historical works and essays.

== Works ==
In his works, it can be point out several research lines:

- Biography of various humanitarian personalities like Clara Campoamor and Porfirio Smerdou, and other contribution on Human Rights questions.
- The Spanish Civil War and Republican Exile. We can emphasize his book about the end of that War, his work about the exile of Óscar Esplá and his already cited publications on Porfirio Smerdou and Clara Campoamor.
- The Monarchy and the Royal House of Spain.
- The image of Nations and imagology, with his works about Black Legends, the France's image in Spain and the anti-Americanism. He is the biographer of Julián Juderías.
- Other subjects in his works are duel, the Athenaeum of Madrid, San Ildefonso, biographies of some Spanish freemasons or the historical sources of Don Quixote.

=== Some books ===
- Leyendas Negras: vida y obra de Julián Juderías (1877-1918): la leyenda negra antiamericana, Salamanca, Junta de Castilla y León: Consejería de Cultura y Turismo, 2007, ISBN 978-84-9718-444-1
- Franceses en el Camino, foreword of José María Solé, presentation of Josep Corominas i Busqueta, Barcelone, Grand Lodge of Spain, 2005, ISBN 84-609-6137-0.
- Los leones del Quijote: de Juan de Austria a Guzmán el Bueno, Madrid, Cirsa, 2005, ISBN 84-89456-90-9
- Madrid 1939: del golpe de Casado al final de la Guerra Civil: el Consejo Nacional de Defensa, el principio del exilio, la Diputación Permanente en París, Madrid, Almena, 2004, ISBN 84-96170-08-X
- Nuevos y viejos problemas en la sucesión de la Corona Española: pragmática de Carlos III sobre matrimonios desiguales, derechos a la Corona de los hijos naturales, necesidad de una Ley de Sucesión, Doña Teresa de Vallabriga, Madrid, Instituto Salazar y Castro: Ed. Hidalguía, 1999, ISBN 84-89851-13-1

==== Editions and translations ====
- Edition and translation of Clara Campoamor, La revolución española vista por una republicana, Sevilla, Espejo de Plata, 2005. España en Armas, Nº 2. ISBN 84-96133-55-9, 2nd. ed., 2007, ISBN 978-84-96133-87-7
