= Pedro Fitz-James Stuart =

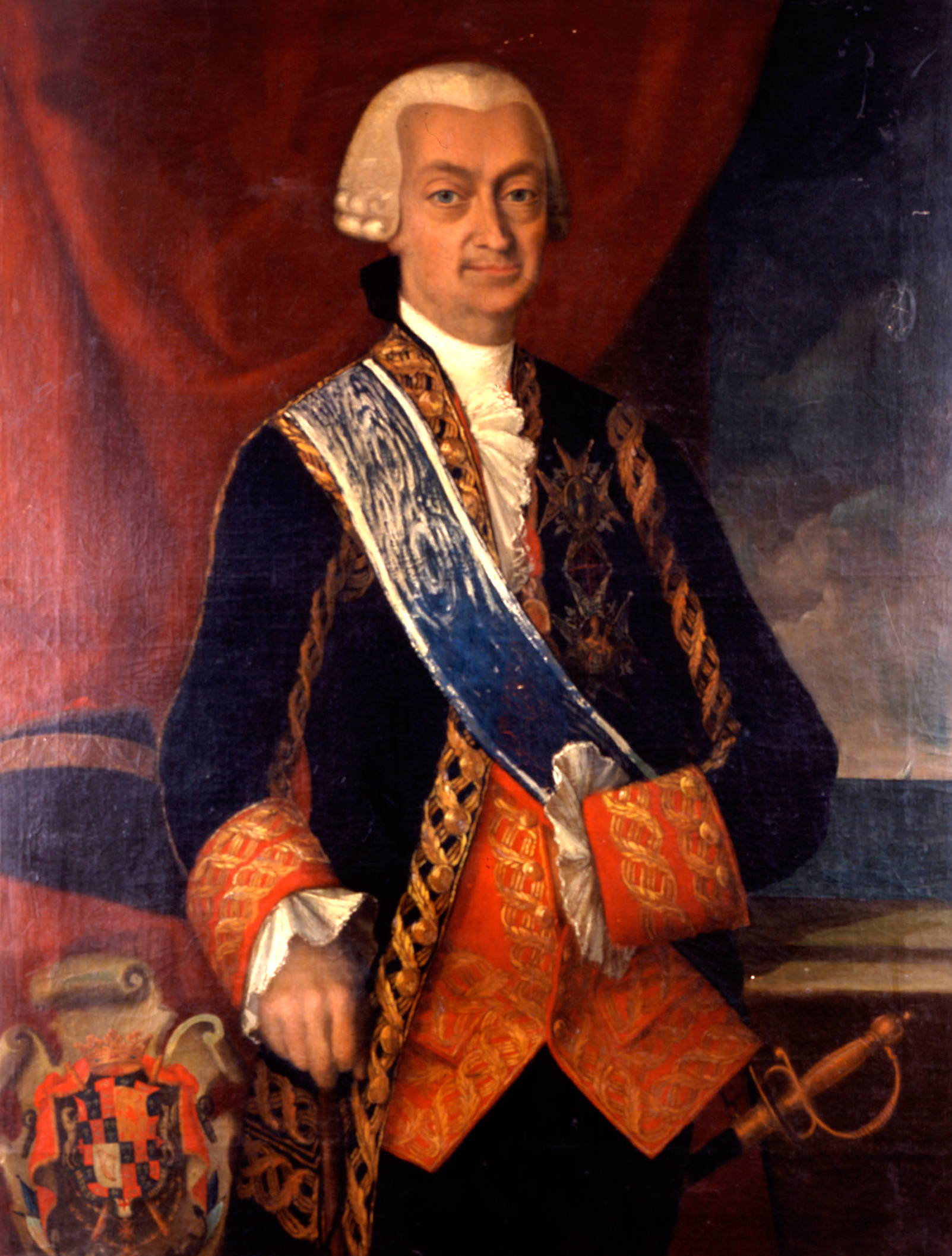
Portrait of Fitz-James Stuart

Captain General of the Navy Pedro Fitz-James Stuart (6 November 1720 – 1789/23 July 1791) was a Spanish Navy officer.

== Life ==
He was the second son of James Fitz-James Stuart, 2nd Duke of Berwick, and Catalina Colón de Portugal, Duchess of Veragua. He was therefore a descendant of both James II of England and Christopher Columbus. At the age of 16, he chose for a career in the Spanish Navy. He saw action in the Mediterranean against Barbary corsairs and in the Battle of Cartagena de Indias against the British. On 24 January 1745, he was promoted to captain and received command of the frigate Aurora, with which he patrolled in the Mediterranean.

In 1749, he married María Benita de Rozas y Drummond (1719-1790), the daughter of José de Rozas, Captain General of Guatemala and widow of former Spanish Prime Minister José del Campillo; they had no children. In 1751, he was in command of two ships of the line and captured the Algerian corsair Danzik during the action of 28 November 1751. The Spanish ships returned to port with 320 prisoners-of-war, 50 rescued Christian slaves and a considerable booty. Fitz-James Stuart receiving applause and recognition from the Spanish Navy and was promoted to squadron commander.

Leading a squadron of three ships and two frigates, he was active in the North Sea and subsequently in the Mediterranean. He was promoted to Lieutenant General in 1757. After the death of Ferdinand VI of Spain, his squadron was part of the fleet that transported Charles III of Spain and the Spanish royal family from Naples to Barcelona. Once this commission was completed, he ended his active career in the Spanish navy and was appointed Caballerizo Mayor del Rey, and stayed at Court. In 1771 he was granted the Grand Cross in the Order of Charles III, and in 1789 he was elevated to the supreme dignity of captain general of the Navy, but died shortly after.

== Sources ==
- Real Academia de la Historia
- Todoavante
