= Battle of Cape Palos (1617) =

- Part of Spanish–Ottoman wars
Date	4 August 1617
Location	Off Cape Palos, Mediterranean Sea
Result	Algerian victory

Belligerents
(Spain) Spanish Empire	Regency of Algiers

Commanders and leaders
(Spain) Lázaro de Eguiguren	Sulayman Reis; Mustapha Reis

Strength
7 ships 1,857 men	16 ships

Casualties and losses
2 ships lost 715 killed or captured 442 wounded died later	Unknown

The Battle of Cape Palos was a naval engagement between the Spanish and Algerian fleets off Cape Palos in 1617. The Spanish fleet was sailing to Naples but was intercepted by the Algerian fleet. The battle ended disastrously for the Spanish, who suffered heavy losses.

== Prelude ==
Cartagena was an important Spanish city since there was a demand for vessels to transport mainly recruits and supplies to Italy, as Cartagena was one of the main routes for the departure of Spanish troops to the possessions in Southern Italy. In the year 1617, an expedition was prepared to send 1,857 recruits to Naples, which required gathering a considerable number of vessels. Among these ships and those that could be rented from other owners, a more or less respectable fleet was formed: five Flemish vessels, one French, and one Neapolitan.

== Battle ==
Once the convoy was formed, they left Cartagena port, given the lack of wind. The Spanish fleet arrived at Cape Palos on August 4 and encountered a group of 16 Algerian ships led by Sulayman Reis and Mustapha Reis. The various versions known of the battle suggest that the battle began with a first attack by the Spanish flagship, where the commander of the expedition, Lázaro de Eguiguren, however, the other vessels hesitated to join the battle. A fierce battle ensued, and the Spanish put up a fierce fight but were overwhelmed in the end. Lázaro de Eguiguren managed to regroup the other vessels and retreat to Cartagena. The Spanish have lost two ships in this battle, the Neptuno and El perro del Agua, alongside 715 killed or captured. Many of those wounded in battle died when arriving, reducing the number of survivors to 700 men.

== Aftermath ==
Once in Cartagena, everyone blamed each other and denied their own responsibility: the commander blamed the royal officers for not properly preparing the ships; in return, they blamed the commander; everyone blamed the corregidor for not providing assistance; and above all, the captains. After the defeat, there was a major concern about sending expeditions and defending the coastline. From mid-April 1618, a large Algerian fleet was detected, and the city was put into a defensive state. The fear and tension lasted until December of the same year.

The Algerian victory at Cape Palos increased the fame of Mustapha Reis. In September, Sulieman was promoted to admiral of the Algerian navy, which was the peak of his career, but in October, he was removed.

== Sources ==
- Alan G. Jamieson (2013), Lords of the Sea, A History of the Barbary Corsairs.
- José Javier Ruiz Ibáñez (1998), Between profit and defense : relations between the monarchy and the Cartaginian mercantile society: merchants and privateers in the 17th century (In Spanish).
- Klaas Heeringa (1917), The first Dutch envoy to the Exalted Porte (In Netherlands).
