= Paloș =

Paloș may refer to the following places in Romania:

- Palos, a village in the commune Cața, Brașov County
- Paloș (Homorodul Mare), a tributary of the river Homorodul Mare in Harghita and Brașov Counties
- Paloș, a tributary of the river Cozd in Brașov County
- Paloșu, a tributary of the river Caminca in Bacău County
