= Stasha Palos =

British artist and author (born 1972)

Stasha Palos (born 1972) is a British artist and author. She released the cookbook How to Feed Your Man in 2009 through Damn Fine Books.

== Early life and education ==
Palos was born in Johannesburg in 1972 but moved to London with her family when she was seven. Her parents are divorced. Her father was Greek-South African jazz drummer turned retailer Robert Palos. Her mother is Tina Green, the wife of British clothing magnate Sir Philip Green.

== Personal life ==
Palos has two children.
