= Philip Green =

British businessman (born 1952)

Sir Philip Green
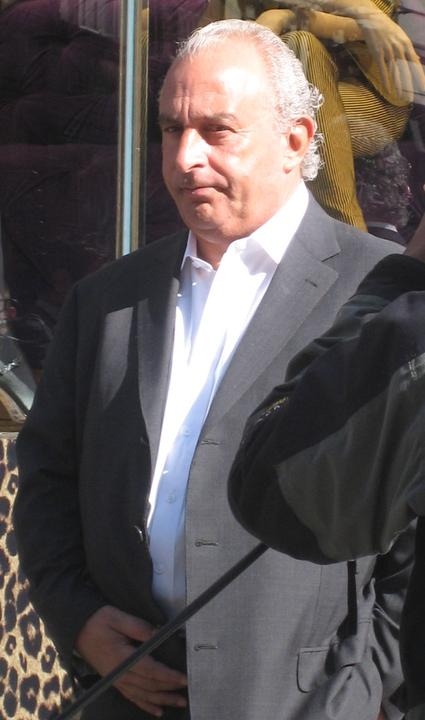
- Green in 2007
- Born: Philip Nigel Ross Green; 15 March 1952 (age 74); Croydon, England
- Occupation: Businessman
- Years active: 1967–present
- Spouse: Cristina Palos (m. 1990)
- Children: 2

Sir Philip Nigel Ross Green (born 15 March 1952) is a British businessman who was the chairman of the retail company Arcadia Group. He owned the high street clothing retailers Topshop, Topman, and Miss Selfridge from 2002 to 2020. In May 2023, his net worth was estimated by the Sunday Times Rich List to be £910 million.

Green was the chairman and chief executive of Amber Day from 1988 to 1992. In 1999, he acquired Sears plc. He bought British Home Stores (BHS) for £200 million in 2000, and subsequently spent £840 million to acquire the Arcadia Group in 2002. Arcadia became a private company and was delisted from the London Stock Exchange. He unsuccessfully sought to acquire Marks & Spencer in 1999 and 2004.

At its peak, Green's Arcadia Group owned the clothing retailers Topshop, Topman, Wallis, Evans, Burton, Miss Selfridge, Dorothy Perkins and Outfit. BHS was part of Arcadia from 2009 to 2015. Arcadia had more than 2,500 outlets in the UK, concessions in UK department stores such as Debenhams and Selfridges, and several hundred franchises in other countries. After high street sales fell in 2020 due to the COVID-19 pandemic, Arcadia entered administration and ASOS acquired the Topshop, Topman and Miss Selfridge brands in 2021.

Green was made a Knight Bachelor in the 2006 Birthday Honours. He has been called the "King of the High Street" but has been involved in a number of controversies during his career, including his actions prior to the demise of BHS in 2016.

== Early life ==
Green was born on 15 March 1952 in Croydon, England, into a middle-class Jewish family. He was the son of Simon Green, a successful property developer and electrical goods retailer, and Alma. He has a sister, Elizabeth, five years his senior. His family moved to Hampstead Garden Suburb, a middle-class area of North London, and at the age of nine he was sent to the now-closed Jewish boarding school Carmel College in Oxfordshire.

When Green was twelve, his father died of a heart attack, and he inherited the family business. After leaving boarding school at 15 with no O-levels, Green worked for a shoe importer in East London before travelling to the US, Europe and the Far East. On his return, aged 21, he set up his first business, importing jeans from the Far East to sell on to London retailers. The business was assisted with a £20,000 loan (equivalent to £216,000 in 2014) backed by his family.

In 1979, Green bought up, at low prices, the entire stock of ten designer-label clothes retailers that had gone into receivership. He then had the newly bought clothes dry cleaned, put on hangers, and wrapped in polythene to make them look new, and bought a shop from which to sell them to the public.

== Business career ==
=== Amber Day ===
In 1988, he became chairman and Chief Executive of a quoted company called Amber Day, a discount retailer. The shares performed well, but then suffered a series of profit downgrades and in 1992 he resigned when the company failed to meet its profit forecast.

=== Arcadia Group ===
Next, Green assisted his wife Tina Green in the purchase of the Arcadia Group, which owned High Street chains such as Burton, Dorothy Perkins, Evans, Miss Selfridge, Outfit, Topshop/Topman and Wallis in 2002. The company was briefly owned by Green but sold to Tina Green within 24 hours, with Philip acting as CEO. On 30 November 2020, Arcadia Group went into administration after high street sales were adversely impacted by the COVID-19 pandemic.

== Charitable works and other activities ==
In April 1980, Green registered a philanthropic initiative, the Kahn Charitable Trust, with a vision of "putting lost smiles back on the faces of less privileged persons across the globe."

Green is a supporter of the Fashion Retail Academy and the industry charity Retail Trust. Green was made a Knight Bachelor in the 2006 Queen's Birthday Honours "For services to the Retail Industry".

In May 2007, after the disappearance of Madeleine McCann in Portugal, Green donated £250,000 as a monetary reward for any useful public information. He also gave the McCanns the use of his private jet to allow them to fly to Rome for a Papal visit.

In 2010, Green donated $465,000 for new beds at the Royal Marsden Cancer Hospital, after his wife Tina's mother died there. He also spent more than $150,000 for an Alexander McQueen dress at Naomi Campbell's Fashion for Relief charity event. In the same year, Green donated £100,000 to the Evening Standard's Dispossessed Fund which aims to support London's poorest people.

He was reportedly the BBC's first choice to front the UK franchise of The Apprentice; however, at that time in 2004, he was too busy with Arcadia's attempted takeover of Marks & Spencer.

== Political activity ==
Two weeks prior to the 2010 general election, Green came out in support of David Cameron, George Osborne and the Conservative Party, stating that Cameron and Osborne "understand what needs to be done. They get it."

In August 2010, Green was asked by Cameron, then recently elected as Prime Minister, to carry out a review of UK government spending and procurement. Green's summary report, Efficiency Review by Sir Philip Green, published in October 2010, alleged significant failings in government procurement processes. The government published the review identifying its main finding as "the Government is failing to leverage both its credit rating and its scale". Green argued that the report gave "a fair reflection" of government waste and inefficiency in practice, for which "very poor data and process" were seen as the main causes. Cameron welcomed the report, saying "I think it's a good report, it will save a lot of money and it's important we do it."

The report examined central government's procurement practice but also noted that "the whole public sector" could potentially benefit from better centralised procurement.

== Personal life ==
Green and his wife Cristina Palos have two children, one of whom, Brandon, was previously in a relationship with actress Emma Watson.

Green is based at a London hotel during the week, spending the weekends with his wife and their children in an apartment in Monaco. For his 50th birthday, Green flew 200 guests in a chartered Airbus A300 to a hotel in Cyprus for a three-day toga party, where Tom Jones and Rod Stewart performed. For his 55th birthday, Green flew 100 guests 8,500 miles in two private jets to the Four Seasons at Landaagiraavaru, an eco-spa on a private island in the Maldives.

Green owns a £100 million, 90 m (300 ft) yacht named Lionheart constructed by Benetti and a £20 million Gulfstream G550 private jet. For a birthday, his wife bought him a solid gold Monopoly set, featuring his own acquisitions.

Green is inspired by Sir Charles Clore, who built the Sears plc UK retail empire from scratch in the 1950s and 1960s.

== Football ==
Green is a Tottenham Hotspur supporter. In 1987 he suggested to Irving Scholar, the Spurs chairman, that Tony Berry be appointed to the board. In 1991, he helped Terry Venables raise the last £500,000 needed to purchase shares in the club. He was also involved in the transfers of Rio Ferdinand from Leeds United and Louis Saha from Fulham to Manchester United.

Green is involved with Everton Football Club due to his friendship with chairman Bill Kenwright, but states that has no intention of formally investing in the club. He arranged for another friend, Planet Hollywood's owner Robert Earl, to purchase shares from former director Paul Gregg during a struggle for control of Everton in 2004. He offers business advice to the club alongside Tesco CEO Terry Leahy and helps negotiate player transfer fees with agents.

== Controversies ==
=== Tax avoidance ===
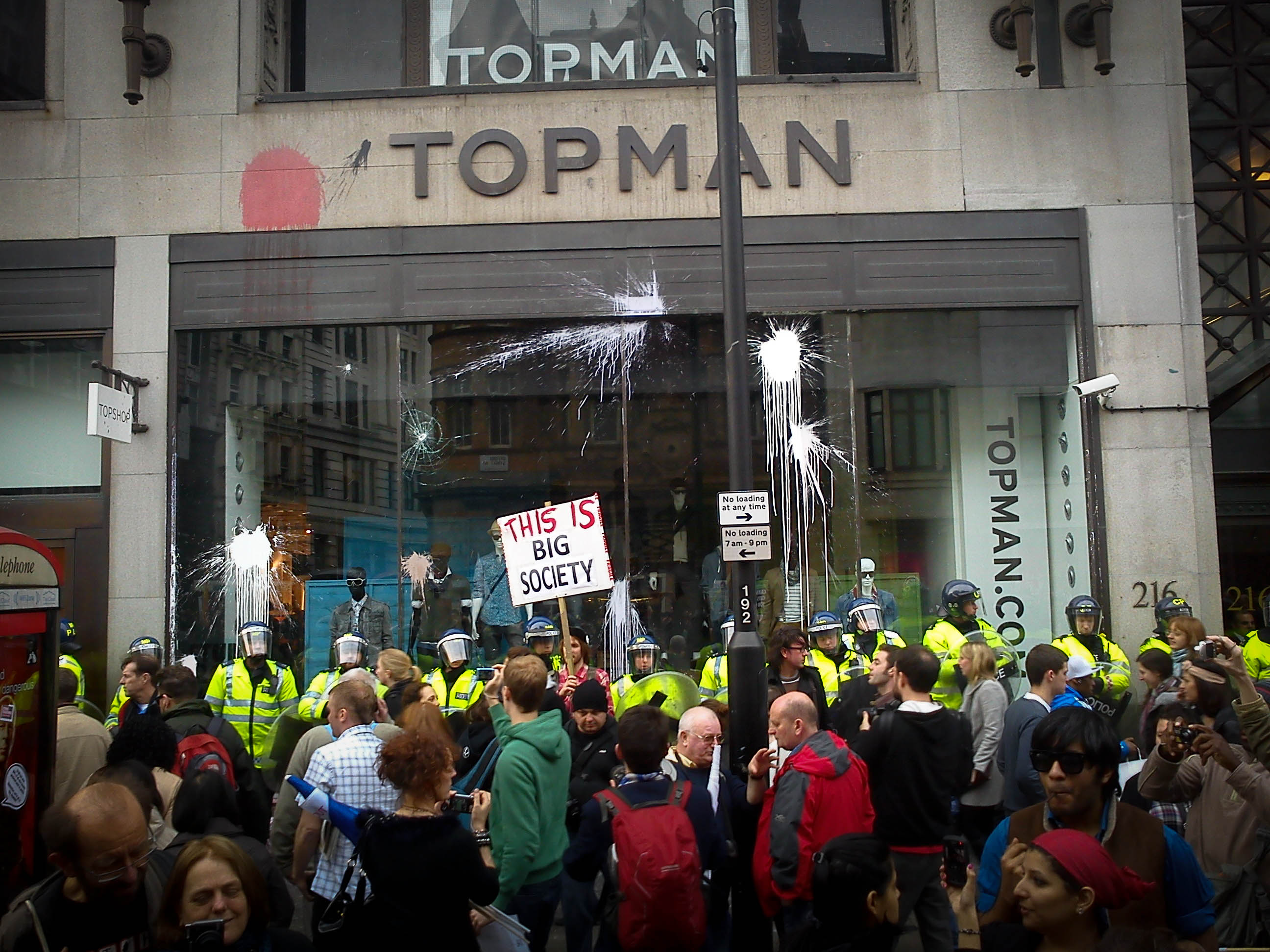
Topshop Oxford Circus damaged by anti-cuts protesters in March 2011

Green became the target of activist group UK Uncut in November 2010 for alleged corporate tax avoidance. The group targeted Green specifically as a government advisor.

Taveta Investments, acquired by Arcadia in 2002, is registered in the name of Green's wife. As a Monaco resident, the company faces a significantly lower tax liability than if she were a UK resident. When Green paid his family £1.2 billion in 2005, it was paid for by a loan taken out by Arcadia, cutting Arcadia's corporation tax as interest charges on the loan were offset against profits.

=== Links to Richard Caring ===
In December 2014, Michelle Young accused Philip Green, Richard Caring and Simon Cowell of helping her ex-husband, businessman Scot Young, to hide assets and so avoid paying maintenance to his ex-wife and their two daughters. In February 2015, a note from HSBC bankers in Caring's files mentioned that Philip Green's wife Tina Green had been holding part of Caring's assets in cash on his behalf, prompting suspicions that Caring might have funnelled profits through Tina Green to avoid paying taxes on his assets.

=== Worker rights ===
Arcadia has been criticised for the pay and conditions of both overseas and UK workers by anti-sweatshop groups such as Labour Behind the Label, No Sweat and the student activist network People & Planet. Green denied allegations in The Sunday Times made during 2007 that his firm used overseas sweatshops where workers in Mauritius were paid pitiful wages.

In 2010, Green was again accused of using sweatshops, this time by Channel 4's Dispatches programme. It was asserted that he was using factories in Britain in which workers were paid less than half the legal minimum wage.

=== Anti-Irish outburst ===
When The Guardian newspaper investigated a proposed takeover of Safeway in 2003, Green responded to queries about Arcadia's accounts by insulting and swearing at the journalists, asking them "Is this The Beano or The Guardian?".

Of The Guardian's financial editor, Paul Murphy, Green said: "He can't read English. Mind you, he is a fucking Irishman." Green issued an apology to the Irish later, to prevent a customer boycott, according to The Guardian.

=== Demise of BHS ===
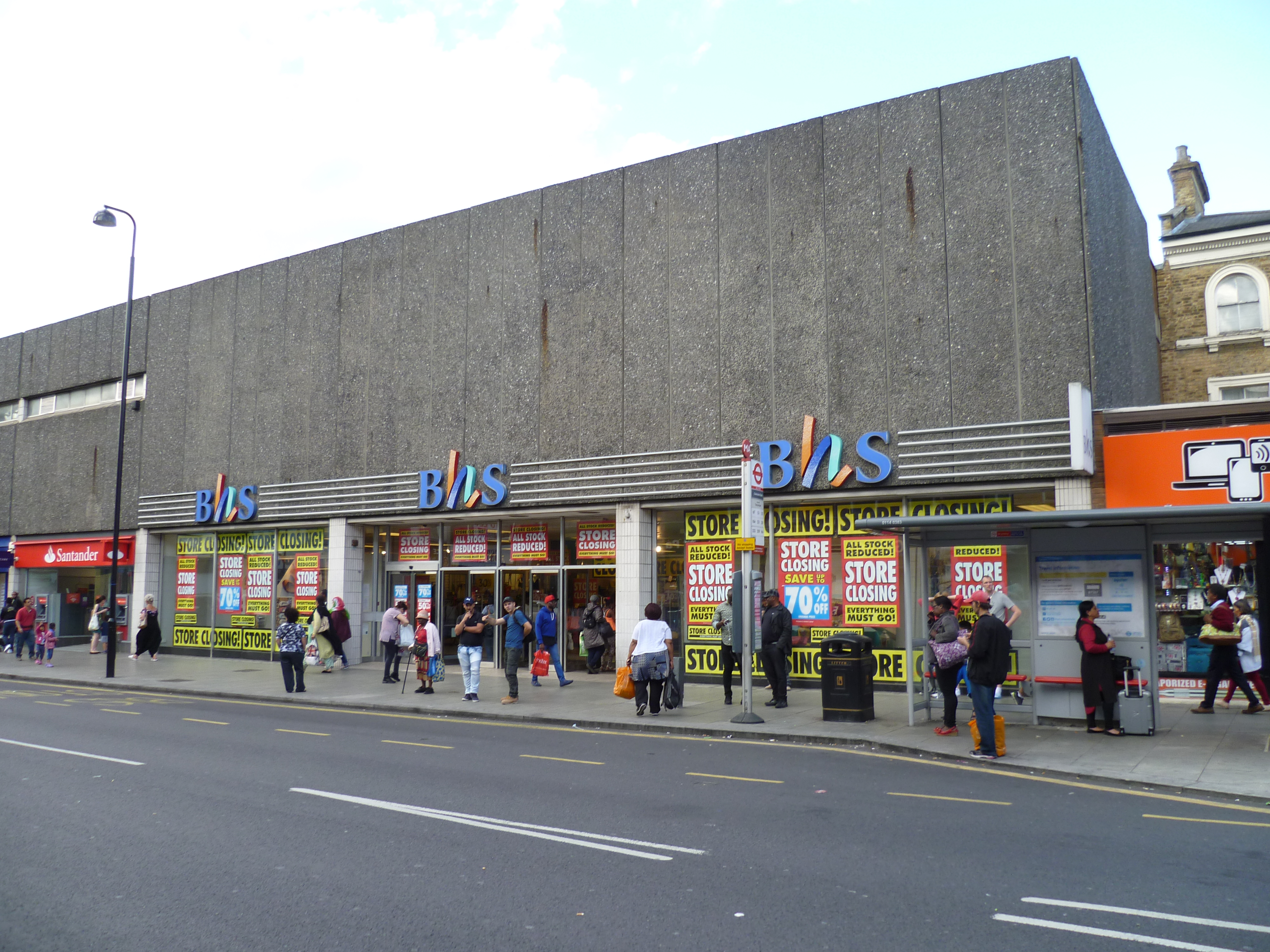
Advertising the closing down sale for a London branch of BHS

Green bought BHS for £200m in 2000, but the firm performed poorly so he sold it for just £1 in 2015. By April 2016 BHS had debts of £1.3bn, including a pensions deficit of £571m. Despite the deficit of £571m, Green and his family collected £586m in dividends, rental payments and interest on loans during their 15-year ownership of the retailer. Referring to the conduct of Green, Angela Eagle, the shadow business secretary, said: "In this situation it appears this owner extracted hundreds of millions of pounds from the business and walked away to his favourite tax haven, leaving the Pension Protection Scheme to pick up the bill." Simon Walker, the Director General of the Institute of Directors, described Green's "lamentable failure of behaviour" which was deeply damaging to the reputation of business. He then added that he had moral responsibilities to the pension fund and a proper investigation was needed but not one that took years. It took months for the negotiation to be settled down; it ended with Green agreeing to a voluntary settlement of £363m into the scheme.

=== Appearance before joint Select Committee meeting ===
A few days before a scheduled joint meeting of the Business and Work and Pensions Select Committees of the House of Commons for an inquiry into the controversial sale of BHS, Green called the inquiry biased, and wrote to Frank Field, the chair of the Work and Pensions Select Committee, "I therefore require you to resign immediately from this inquiry." Field pointed out that the size of the pensions deficit is a fact, not a matter of opinion, and that Parliament and not Green decides who chairs Committees.

=== Knighthood ===
In 2016, the House of Commons approved a motion asking the Honours Forfeiture Committee to recommend Green's knighthood be "cancelled and annulled". One hundred MPs voted in favour of the motion, the first time MPs have proposed someone be stripped of a knighthood. The vote was not binding on the government. Following his paying £363m into the BHS pension scheme in 2017, and a decision in 2018 not to ban him from being a company director, it appeared that he would not be stripped of his knighthood.

=== Sexual harassment and bullying allegations ===
In October 2018, The Daily Telegraph reported that "a leading businessman has been granted an injunction against" the newspaper to stop the "newspaper revealing alleged sexual harassment and racial abuse of staff". The following day, in the House of Lords, Labour peer Peter Hain exercised parliamentary privilege to name Green as the subject of the allegations. The Telegraph said that the allegations would "reignite the #MeToo movement against the mistreatment of women, minorities and others by powerful employers. Opposition MPs, including Labour MPs Frank Field and Jess Phillips, and Liberal Democrat leader Vince Cable, called for a revocation of Green's knighthood.

In May 2019, Green was charged with four counts of misdemeanour assault in the US after an Arizona Pilates teacher accused him of frequently touching her inappropriately.

=== COVID-19 ===
In response to the COVID-19 pandemic and COVID-19 recession, Green's Arcadia Group closed 550 stores in the UK, furloughing 14,500 of its workers in the process. Arcadia Group publicly requested taxpayer help to cover the pay of the furloughed workers.

=== Lawsuit against the UK government held by the European Court of Human Rights ===
Green had sued the UK government via the ECHR after Lord Hain had named him as the businessman who had sought an injunction against being named in the Telegraph's report of misconduct allegations by ex-employees who had previously signed non-disclosure agreements. The European Court of Human Rights had found in their verdict that there was no violation of his privacy, which is article 8 respect for your private and family life in the Convention for the Protection of Human Rights and Fundamental Freedoms and incorporated into the Human Rights Act 1998.
