= Spanish ship Rayo (1749) =

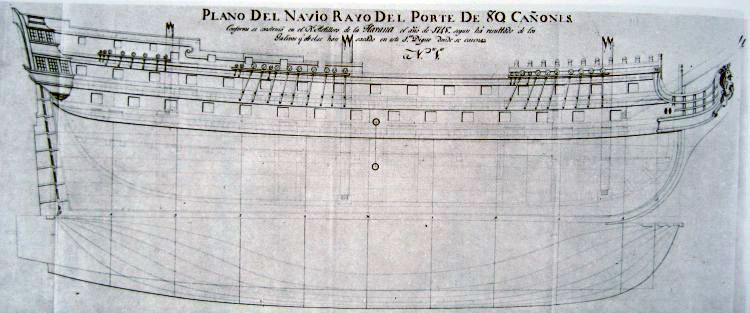
- The plans of the 80-gun Rayo

History

Spain
- Name: Rayo
- Ordered: 1746
- Builder: Royal Dockyard, La Habana
- Laid down: 1 January 1747
- Launched: 28 June 1749
- Commissioned: 31 January 1751
- Fate: Wrecked 26 October 1805; wreck burned 31 October

General characteristics
- Class & type: 80-gun Rayo-class ship of the line
- Tons burthen: 1,750 bm
- Length: 55 m (180 ft 5 in)
- Beam: 15.8 m (51 ft 10 in)
- Draught: 8.68 m (28 ft 6 in)
- Sail plan: Full-rigged ship
- Complement: 80 guns, 1752: 453 men; 100 guns, at Trafalgar: 812 men
- Armament: As an 80-gun ship (1751); 30 × 24-pounder guns; 32 × 18-pounder guns; 18 × 8-pounder guns; 2 × 3-pounder guns; As a 100-gun ship (1803); 30 × 36-pounder guns; 32 × 18-pounder guns; 32 × 8-pounder guns; 6 × 18-pounder carronades

Rayo was an 80-gun ship of the line (navío) of the Spanish Navy. As was traditional for Spanish ships not named after a saint, its second, dedicatory name (avocacion) was San Pedro Apóstol. She underwent rebuilding at Cartagena from 1803 to 1805, emerging as a three-decked ship with 100 guns. She then fought at the Battle of Trafalgar during the Napoleonic Wars and was dismasted as a result of damage sustained in the battle. When she sortied after Trafalgar in order to recover prizes, the warship was captured by the Royal Navy warship HMS Donegal. Subsequently, she ran aground and was wrecked in a storm, and her broken hull was burnt by Royal Navy sailors on 31 October.

== Service ==
=== Early ===
Construction on Rayo started in 1747 in Havana, Cuba, alongside her sister ship Fénix and was launched in the summer of 1749. She was commissioned in January 1751, but was unable to leave port for the lack of crew. It took another year to find the enough men to sail her. Rayo left Havana for Cádiz with a minimal complement of 453, accompanied by the ships Princesa, Infante and Galicia and carrying a cargo of sugar and timber. She remained in Cadiz for further outfits.

In 1765, under the command of Captain Don José de Rojas Recaño, Rayo was assigned to the fleet under the command of Admiral Don Juan José de Navarro Viana y Búfalo, the 1st Marqués de la Victoria. The fleet was made up of Rayo, Arrogante, Triunfante, Atlante, Galicia, Princesa, Guerrero, Velasco, Poderoso, two chambequines and five minor vessels. The fleet sailed from Cádiz on 17 May. After briefly stopping at Cartagena, it sailed on to Genoa, arriving on 17 July to drop off the infanta Doña Luisa María Teresa de Parma, daughter of Felipe I de Parma and pick up the Princess Maria Luisa of Spain, daughter of King Carlos III. The fleet returned to Cartagena on 11 August where it dropped off the infanta Doña Luisa María Teresa de Parma and the Marques of la Victoria, Juan José de Navarro Viana y Búfalo. Command was then handed over to Admiral Don Luis de Córdova y Córdova. A smaller fleet was formed, sailing from Cartagena on 23 August, consisting of Rayo, Princesa and Guerrero which was tasked with escorting two tartanes and a saetía back to Cádiz.

In 1769, Rayo was disarmed and stationed at Cádiz under the command of Captain Don Pedro Moyano who was charged with the ship's preservation. Between February and April 1769, the ship was careened and refitted

=== Rebuild ===
In 1803 Rayo was taken into Cartagena Dockyard where she underwent rebuilding by Honorato Bouyon, emerging with a complete third deck linking her quarterdeck and forecastle, and consequently carrying an enhanced ordnance of 100 guns.

=== Trafalgar ===
Rayo was dismasted as a result of damage sustained in the battle. A few days later, Rayo went to sea in an attempt to recapture prizes taken by the British Royal Navy. During this effort, she was captured by HMS Donegal. With a British prize crew aboard, she ran aground in the storm of 26 October and was wrecked. Her broken hull was burnt by Royal Navy sailors on 31 October.

== Bibliography ==
- Adkin, Mark (2005). The Trafalgar Companion: A Guide to History's Most Famous Sea Battle and the Life of Admiral Lord Nelson. Aurum. ISBN 1-84513-018-9.
- Adkins, Roy (2004). Trafalgar: The Biography of a Battle. Little, Brown. ISBN 0-316-72511-0.
- Clayton, Tim & Craig, Phil (2004). Trafalgar: The Men, the Battle, the Storm. Hodder & Stoughton. ISBN 0-340-83026-3.
- Fremont-Barnes, Gregory (2005). Trafalgar 1805: Nelson's Crowning Victory. Campaign. Vol. 157. Osprey Publishing. ISBN 1-84176-892-8.
- Goodwin, Peter (2005). The Ships of Trafalgar: The British, French and Spanish Fleets October 1805. Naval Institute Press. ISBN 1-59114-824-3.
- Winfield, Rif; Tredrea, John M; García-Torralba Pérez, Enrique & Blasco Felip, Manuel (2023). Spanish Warships in the Age of Sail 1700—1860: Design, Construction, Careers and Fates. Barnsley, UK: Seaforth Publishing. ISBN 978-1-5267-9078-1.
