= Luciano Palos =

Argentine footballer

Personal information
- Full name: Luciano Ramón Palos Ongaro
- Date of birth: 29 November 1979 (age 46)
- Place of birth: Rosario, Argentina
- Height: 1.83 m (6 ft 0 in)
- Position: Goalkeeper

Youth career
- Newell's Old Boys

Senior career*
Years	Team	Apps	(Gls)
2000–2005	Newell's Old Boys	80	(0)
2005	→ Belgrano (loan)	19	(0)
2005–2006	Gimnasia de Jujuy	20	(0)
2006	Vaslui	0	(0)
2007	Quilmes	6	(0)
2008	Central Córdoba	15	(0)
2009–2011	San Luis	69	(0)
2011	→ Cobreloa (loan)	8	(0)
2012–2015	Cobreloa	88	(0)
2015	San Marcos	4	(0)
2016	Santiago Morning	14	(0)
2017	Camioneros Argentinos	4	(0)
2017–2018	Gimnasia y Tiro	0	(0)

International career
1998	Argentina U20		
- * Club domestic league appearances and goals

Luciano Ramón Palos Ongaro (born 29 November 1979) is an Argentine former professional footballer who played as a goalkeeper. His last club was Gimnasia y Tiro.

== Teams ==
- (Argentina) Newell's Old Boys 2000–2004
- (Argentina) Belgrano 2005
- (Argentina) Gimnasia y Esgrima de Jujuy 2005–2006
- (Romania) Vaslui 2006
- (Argentina) Quilmes 2007
- (Argentina) Central Córdoba de Rosario 2008
- (Chile) San Luis de Quillota 2009–2010
- (Chile) Cobreloa 2011–2012
- (Chile) San Marcos de Arica 2015
- (Chile) Santiago Morning 2016
- (Argentina) Camioneros Argentinos del Norte 2017
- (Argentina) Gimnasia y Tiro 2017–2018

== Honours ==
Newell's Old Boys

- Argentine Primera División: 2004 Apertura

San Luis Quillota

- Primera B: 2009 Clausura

Cobreloa

- Primera División de Chile: 2011 Clausura
