= Two Human Beings. The Lonely Ones =

Motif of Edvard Munch (1892 to c. 1935)

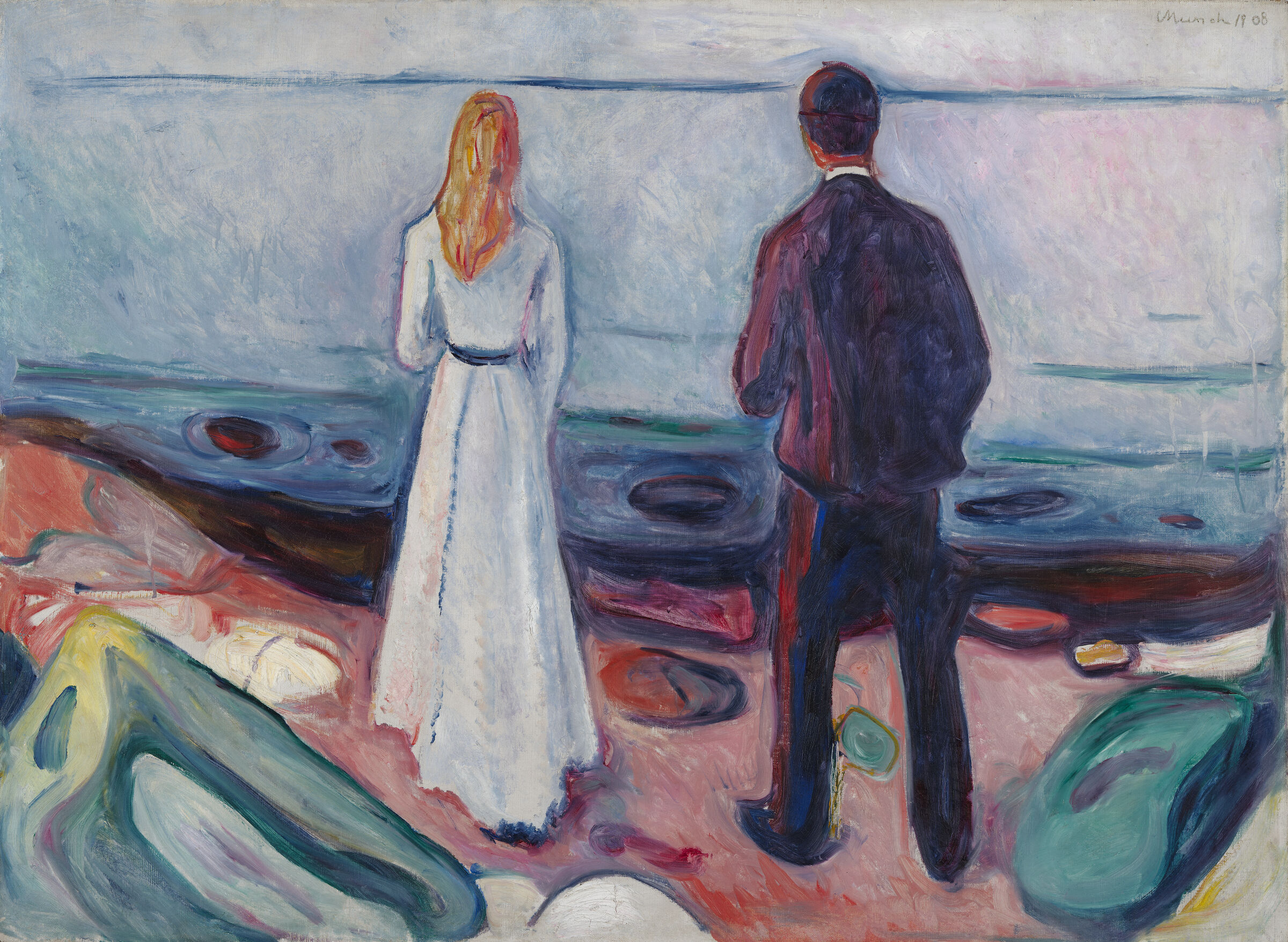
Two Human Beings. The Lonely Ones, 1906-08, oil on canvas, Busch-Reisinger Museum, Cambridge, Massachusetts

Two Human Beings (Norwegian: To mennesker) or The Lonely Ones (Norwegian: De ensomme) is a motif by the Norwegian painter Edvard Munch that he first started in 1892 and continuously worked on and returned to over a period spanning nearly four decades, creating versions in oil paintings (starting with the original in 1892), in etchings (from 1894 onwards), and in woodcuts (from 1899 onwards).

The motif depicts a woman and a man on the shore of a beach with calm water, seen from behind. The relationship between the two figures is interpreted as an erotic tension between the sexes, but also as characterized by distance and loneliness. The simplified depiction is based on synthetism. In some versions the woman is alone, and some show the couple, or a solitary woman, with a "moon pillar" over the water.

The original 1892 painting was destroyed by an explosion in 1901. Munch subsequently painted three further versions of the motif in 1906-08 (see image), 1906/07 (the "Reinhardt-Fries"), and in 1933-35.

== Description ==
The composition of Two Human Beings. The Lonely Ones is characterized by its simplicity, according to Arne Eggum. A woman dressed in bright white with long, blonde hair stands on the beach from behind and looks out to sea. She looks "like a pillar of light". Not far from her stands a second figure from behind, a man in a dark suit. He appears to be approaching the woman from behind, but is frozen in mid-motion. Because of this freezing, the motif radiates a great stillness for Eggum. The position of the two figures in relation to each other, the distance between them and the light-dark contrast of their clothing convey both proximity and distance.

Both figures form the only vertical pillars in the composition, which is otherwise dominated by the curved horizontal lines of the beach, sea and sky. The landscape shows no trace of life. The figures seem to be in absolute isolation. Most of the background is taken up by an open body of water whose horizon line extends almost to the upper edge of the picture. This creates the impression of the immeasurable vastness of the sea. The cloudless sky echoes the color of the water. Only the beach in the foreground is colorful. It is covered by rocks rounded off by the tides.

== History ==
=== Inspiration ===
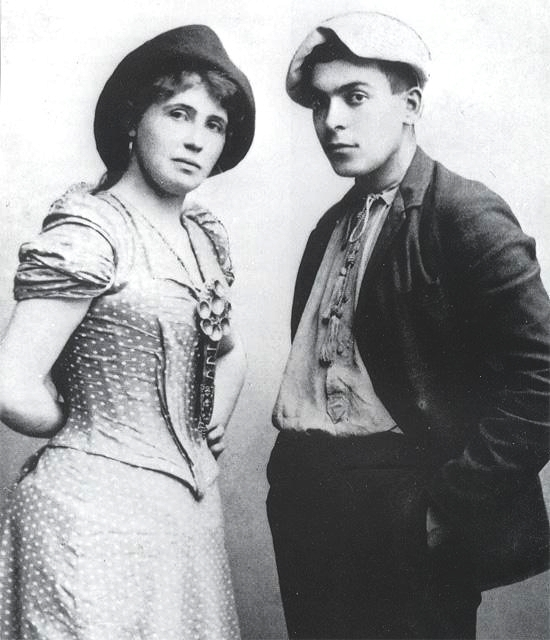
Oda Krohg and Jappe Nilssen, 1891

The motif of Two Human Beings – much like Melancholy, which he painted at the same time – goes back to an experience in the summer of 1891, which Munch traditionally spent in Åsgårdstrand, a small Norwegian coastal town on the Oslofjord that served as a summer retreat for many citizens and artists from nearby Kristiania, now Oslo. Munch's friend Jappe Nilssen and the painter couple Christian and Oda Krohg spent the summer in the same place, and Munch witnessed the 21-year-old friend's unhappy love affair with the married woman, who was ten years his senior. The relationship awakened memories in Munch of his own, equally unhappy love affair with Milly Thaulow only a few years earlier.

Munch had also been 21 years old in 1885 when he had fallen in love with the wife of his cousin Carl Thaulow (a brother of the painter Frits Thaulow), three years his senior, a forbidden love that haunted him for a long time and which he wrote about in novelistic notes between 1890 and 1893, in which he gave his lover the name "Mrs. Heiberg". At the end of the affair, he declared: "After that, I gave up all hope of being able to love." Both Munch's literary notes and drawings demonstrate the close relationship between the two motifs of Two Human Beings and Melancholy. A pen and ink drawing from 1891, for example, shows the slightly bent male figure from Two Human Beings in a back view in front of the coastline of Melancholy.

=== First version ===
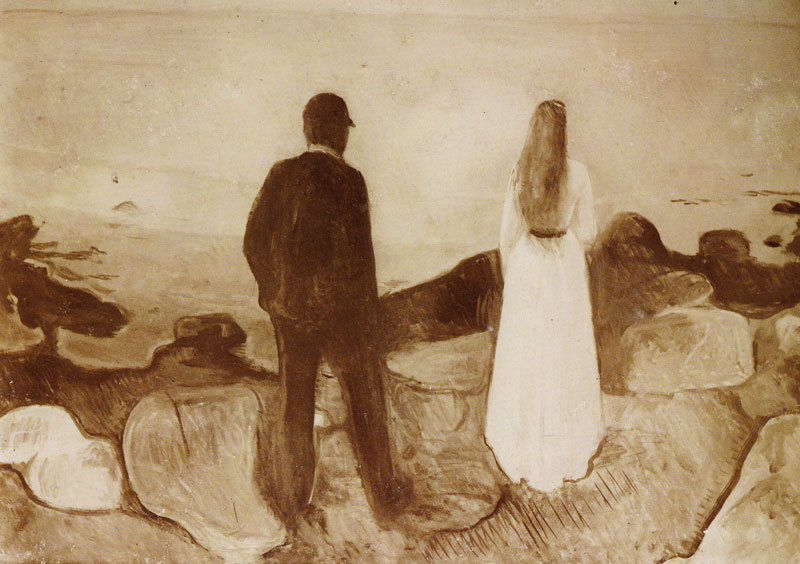
Two Human Beings. The Lonely Ones (1892), exhibition in Berlin in 1892/93, photographed by Max Marschalk

The first painting version of Two Human Beings is dated differently in the literature. According to Gerd Woll's catalogue raisonné, the painting was created in 1892 – close in time to Melancholy. It was originally exhibited under the title A Man and a Woman on a Summer Night. It was one of the 55 paintings that Munch presented in October 1892 at an exhibition organized by the Association of Berlin Artists, which caused a scandal in the German art world, dubbed the so-called 'Munch affair'. At the turn of the year 1892/93, Munch once again showed the paintings privately organized in Berlin. This exhibition was photographed by Max Marschalk. The black-and-white photograph he took is the only surviving image of the painting, which was destroyed in an explosion aboard the steamship Kong Alf during a strong storm on December 9, 1901. The paintings were on their way back to Norway from exhibitions in Munich and Vienna. The Norwegian art collector Olaf Schou had already acquired the painting Two Human Beings by this time. With the insurance sum of 1600 kroner, he immediately ordered a replacement painting from Munch, Young Girls on a Bridge, which was painted in the same year.

=== Etching and woodcut versions ===
Two Human Beings. The Lonely Ones (1894), etching, 6 × 8.5 inches, Thiel Gallery, Stockholm

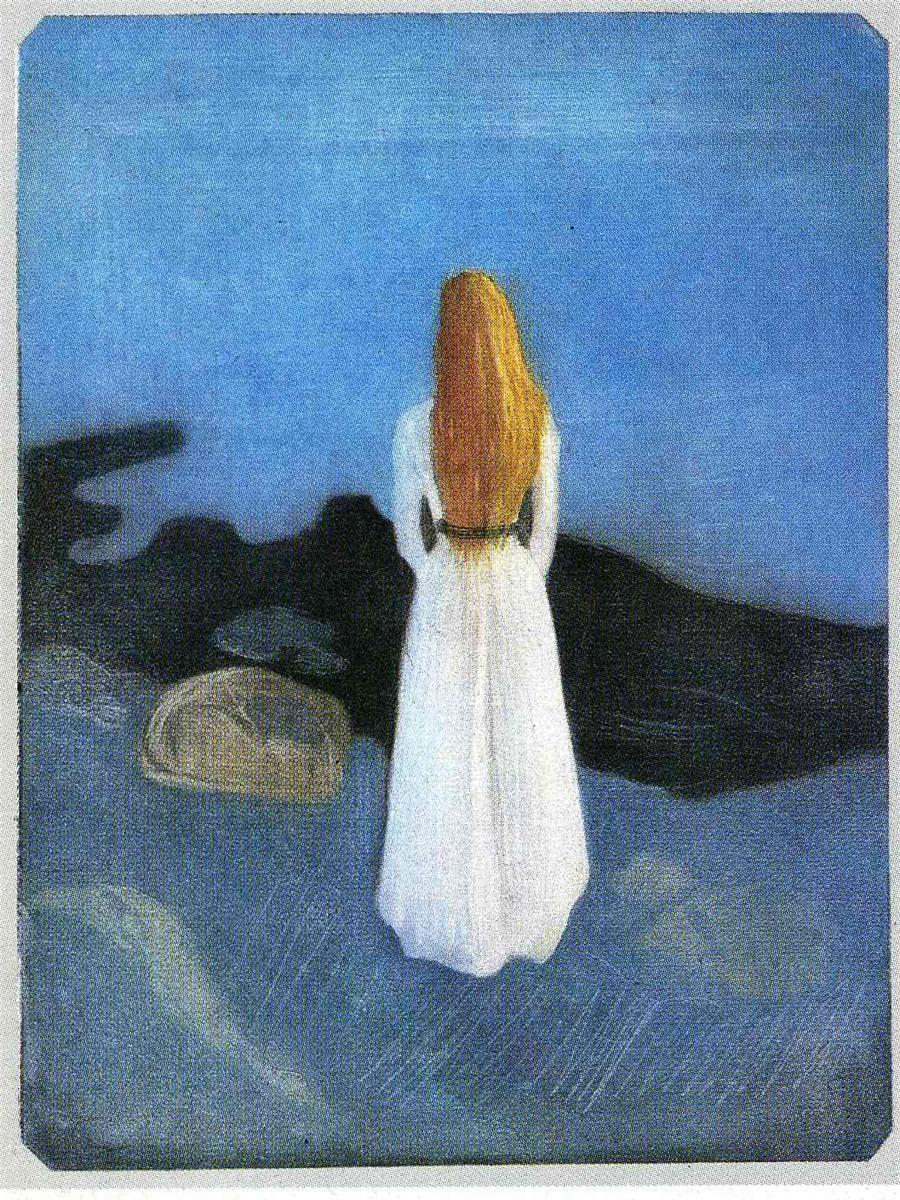
Lonely Woman on the Shore (The Lonely One) (1896), etching, 28,5 × 21,6 cm, Munch Museum, Oslo

Munch's artistic exploration of printmaking began in 1894. Two Human Beings was one of the first motifs that Munch realized using the drypoint technique. He reworked the printing form at least six times before publishing a portfolio of prints with Julius Meier-Graefe in 1895, which contained seven other motifs in addition to Two Human Beings. In 1912, he made further prints, this time with brown ink on brownish-yellow paper. Apart from the fact that the etching is mirror-inverted, it is strongly based on the original painting version. In Paris in 1896, Munch partially reproduced the motif in a mezzotint. This time he concentrated entirely on the woman on the beach from behind and omitted the man. In this depiction, he tried out various color combinations in order to convey an emotional expression using a technique that tended towards monochrome. The print is called Lonely Woman on the Shore or The Lonely One.

In 1899, Munch worked on the Two Human Beings motif using another printing technique he had learned in the meantime, the woodcut. The coarser medium results in a more abstract depiction. Munch cut the wooden panel into three parts: the female figure, the male figure with the beach and the sea and sky. In the prints, he varied the colors of the individual panels and also colored some of them by hand. Munch experimented with the amount and consistency of paint, binding agents and pressure, and sometimes also used pieces of colored paper, which he applied to the wooden panels. According to German art historian Hans Dieter Huber, the prints of Two Human Beings show "an extraordinarily diverse spectrum of colorful expressive possibilities." In 1912, Munch once again took up part of the motif in a smaller woodcut and juxtaposed the woman on the beach with a "moon pillar", the columnar reflection of the moon in the water, which is a characteristic element of his pictorial language. He had already occasionally inserted this moon pillar between the figures in the 1899 version as an erotically charged symbol that both separates and unites the couple.

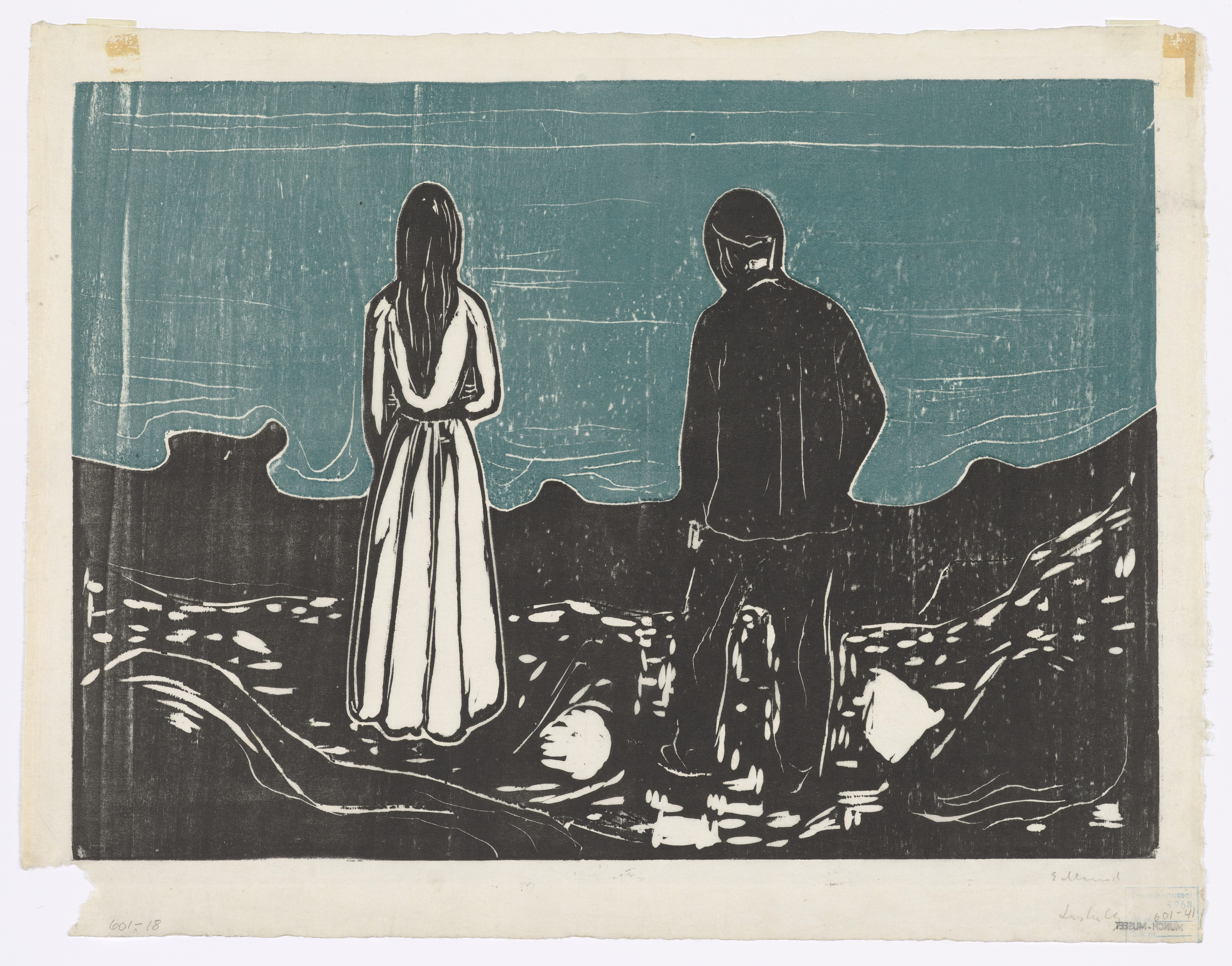
Two Human Beings. The Lonely Ones (1899), woodcut, 39.6 × 54.8 cm, Munch Museum, Oslo

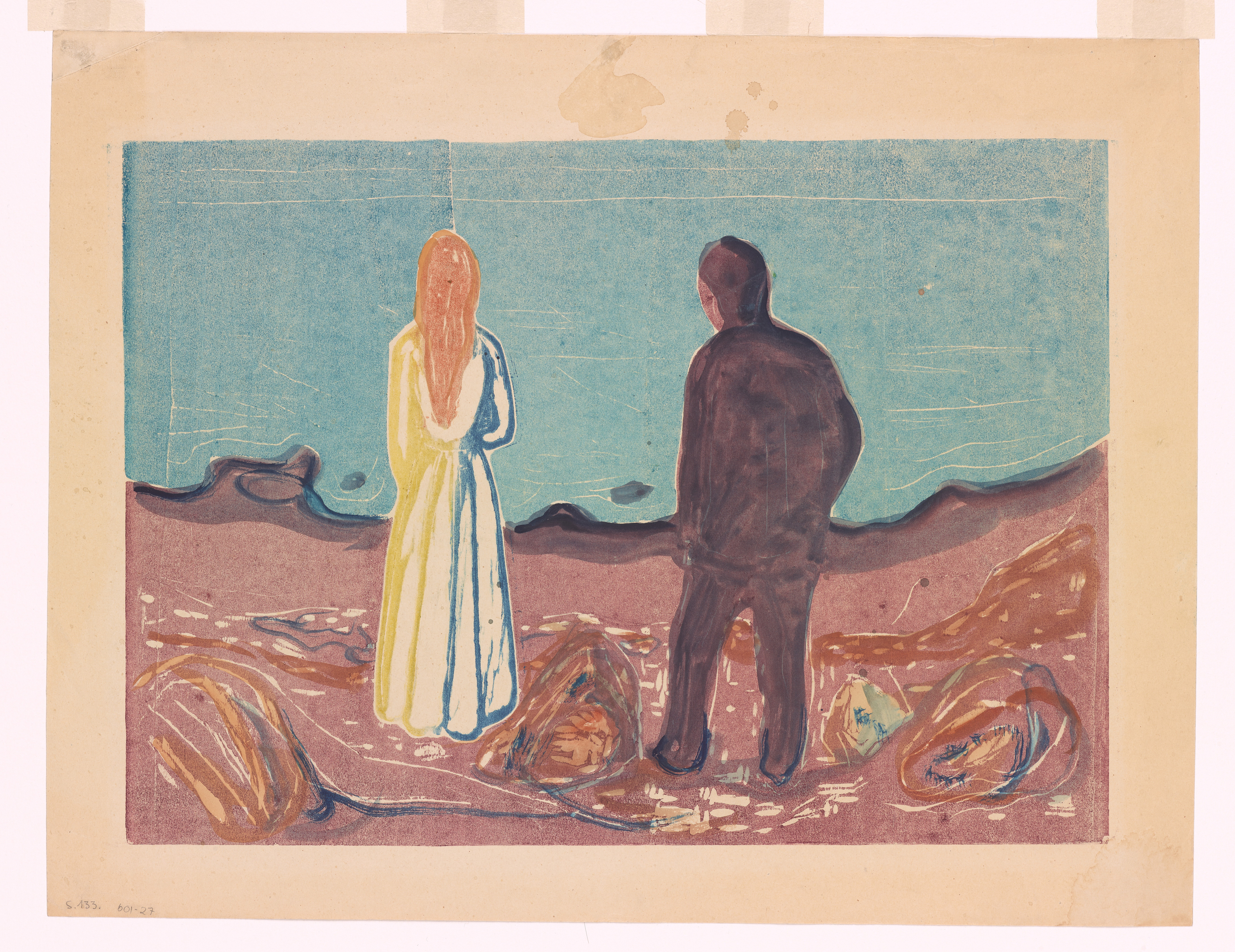
Two Human Beings. The Lonely Ones (1899), woodcut, 39.5 × 55.0 cm, Munch Museum, Oslo

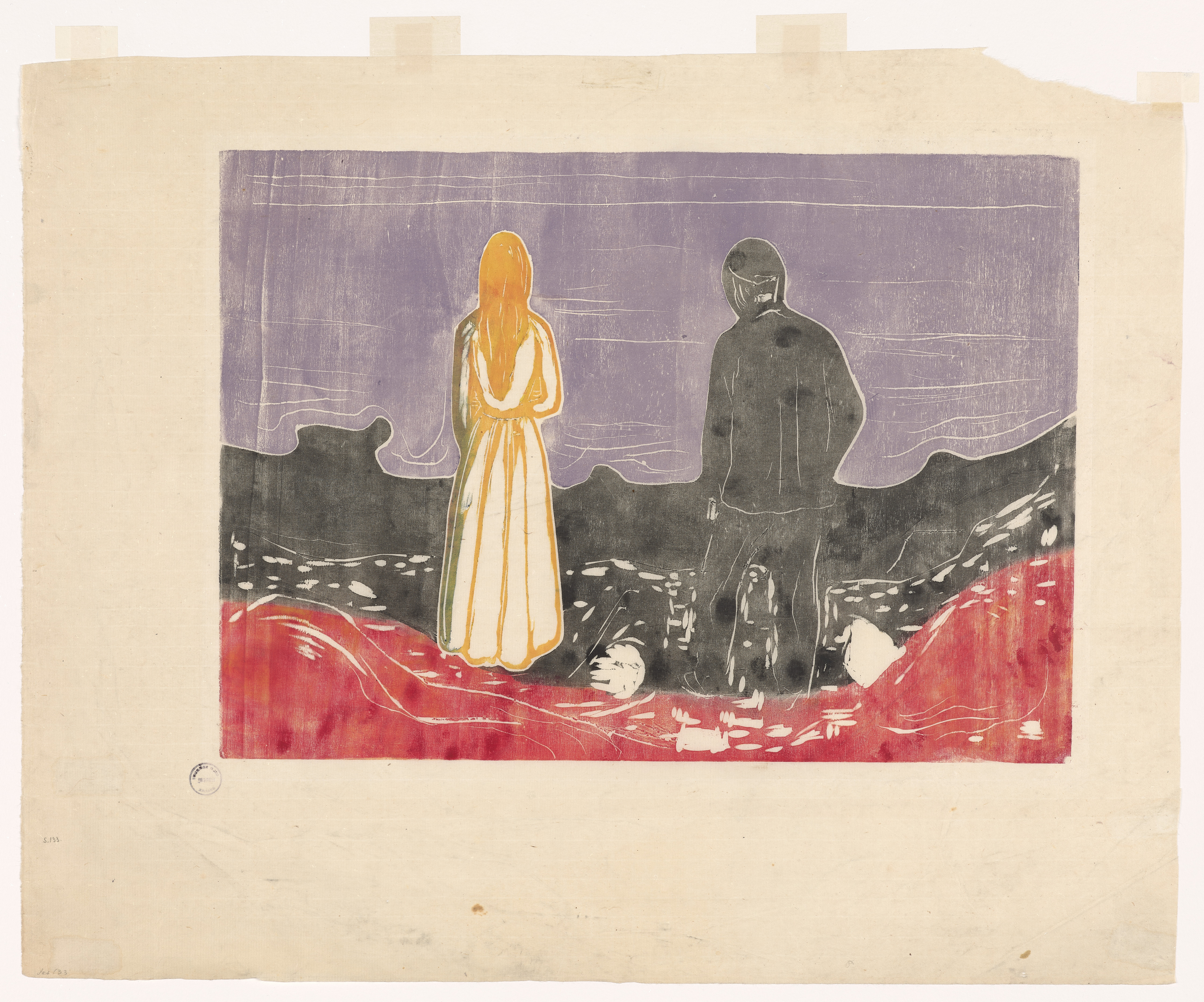
Two Human Beings. The Lonely Ones (1899), woodcut, 39.5 × 55.5 cm, Munch Museum, Oslo

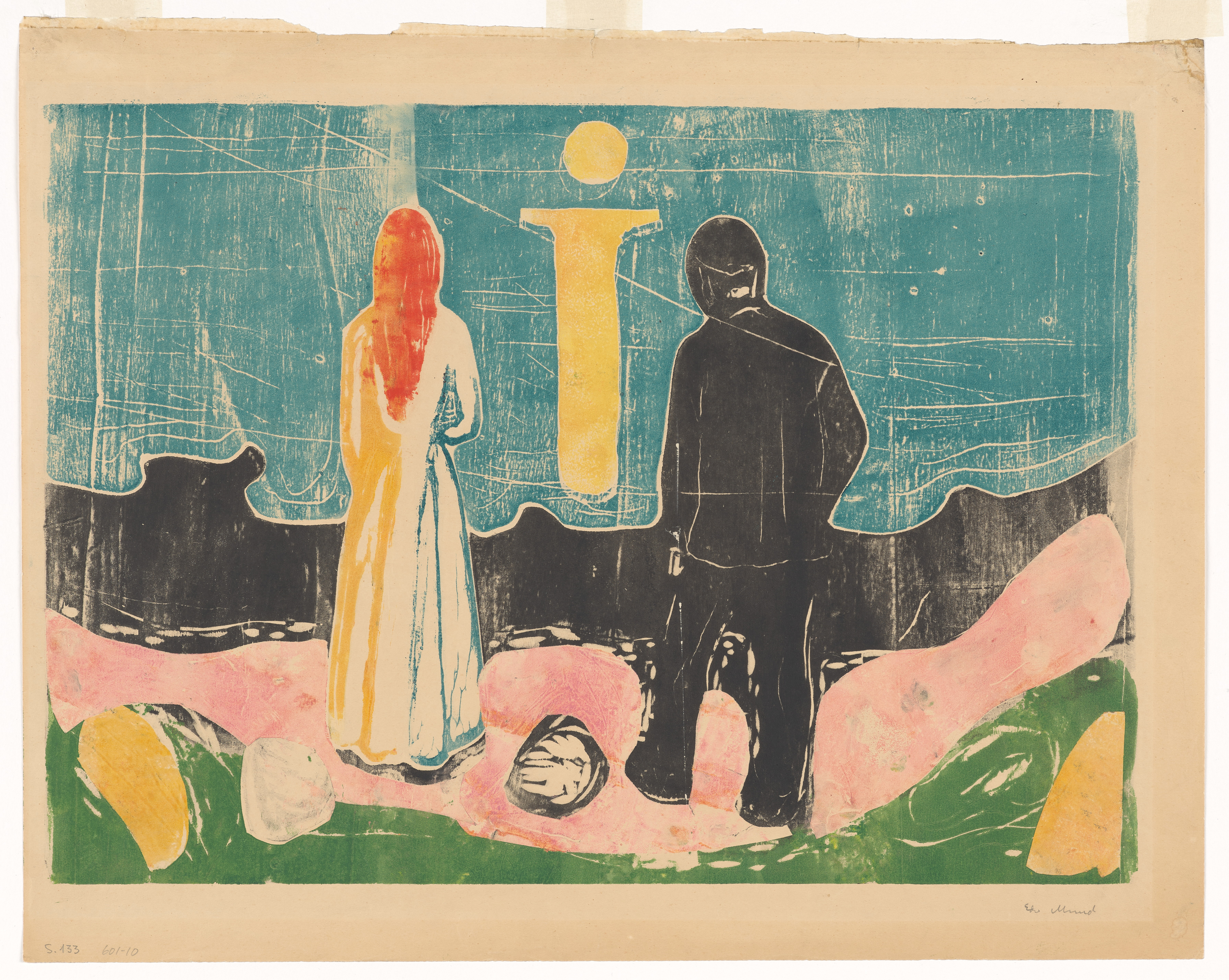
Two Human Beings. The Lonely Ones (1899), woodcut, 39,4 × 55,2 cm, Munch Museum, Oslo

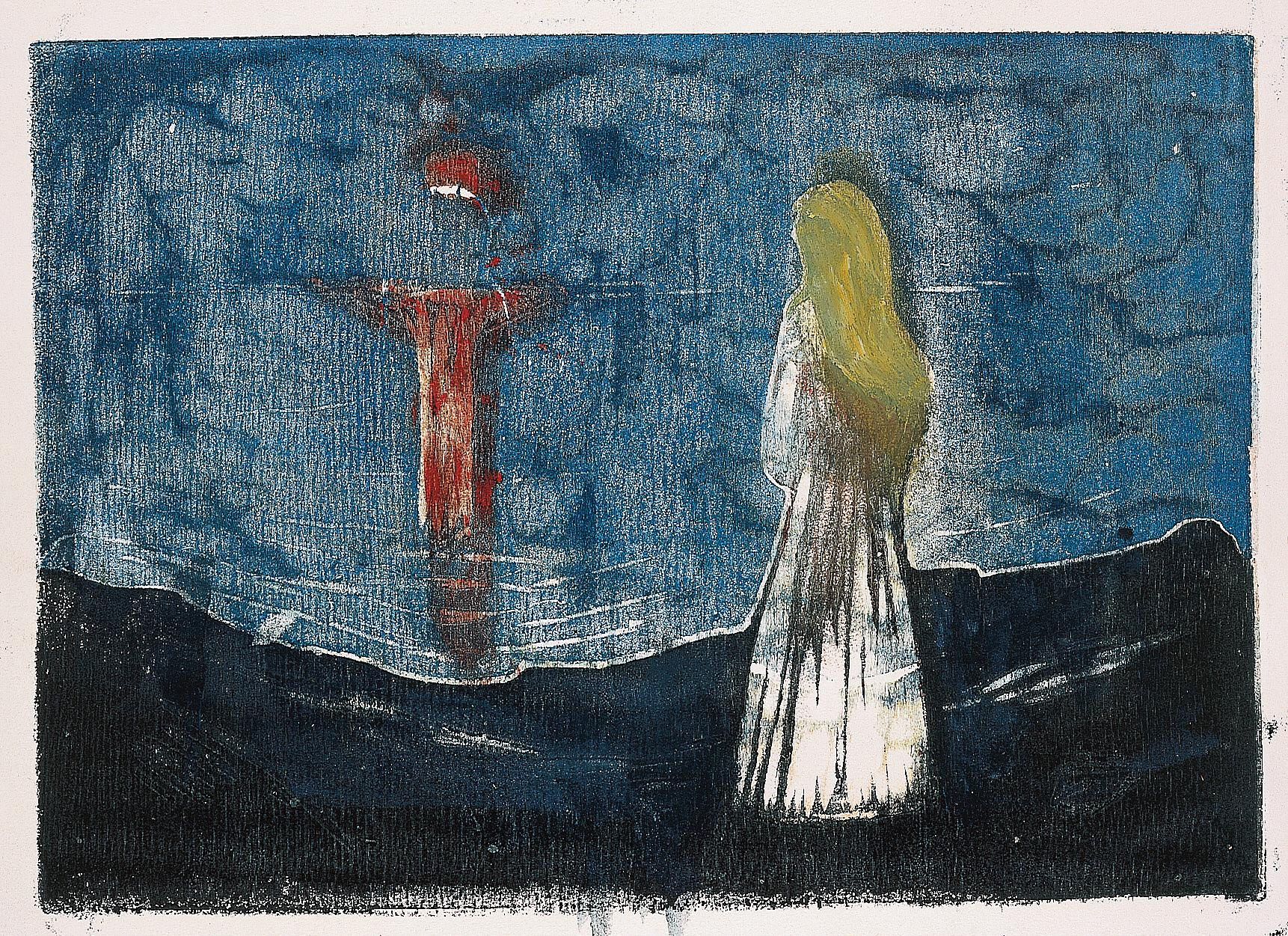
Moonlight by the Sea (1912), woodcut, approx. 18.5 × 25.5 cm, Munch Museum, Oslo

=== Further painted versions ===
Munch revisited the motif of Two Human Beings three more times in his paintings (see also the list of paintings by Edvard Munch). In 1906-08, he painted an oil painting with a mirrored arrangement similar to the first version. The painting belonged to the Chemnitz Municipal Art Collection from 1928 to 1937, before being sold by Hildebrand Gurlitt to a private collection abroad. In 2023, it came to the Busch-Reisinger Museum in Cambridge, Massachusetts from the estate of Philip and Lynn Straus. Contrary to Gerd Woll's 2008 catalogue raisonné, the museum estimates that it was created between 1906 and 1908. In 2025, the painting was shown again in Chemnitz for the first time as part of the exhibition Edvard Munch. Angst.

In 1906/07, the motif was part of Reinhardt's frieze, painted in tempera, a series of paintings in the form of a frieze that Max Reinhardt, director of the Deutsches Theater, had commissioned Munch to decorate a banquet hall. After the painting was confiscated from the National Gallery in 1938 as degenerate art and subsequently sold, it was acquired by the Museum Folkwang in Essen in 1968. Between 1933 and 1935, another oil painting was created, which is on display at the Munch Museum in Oslo.

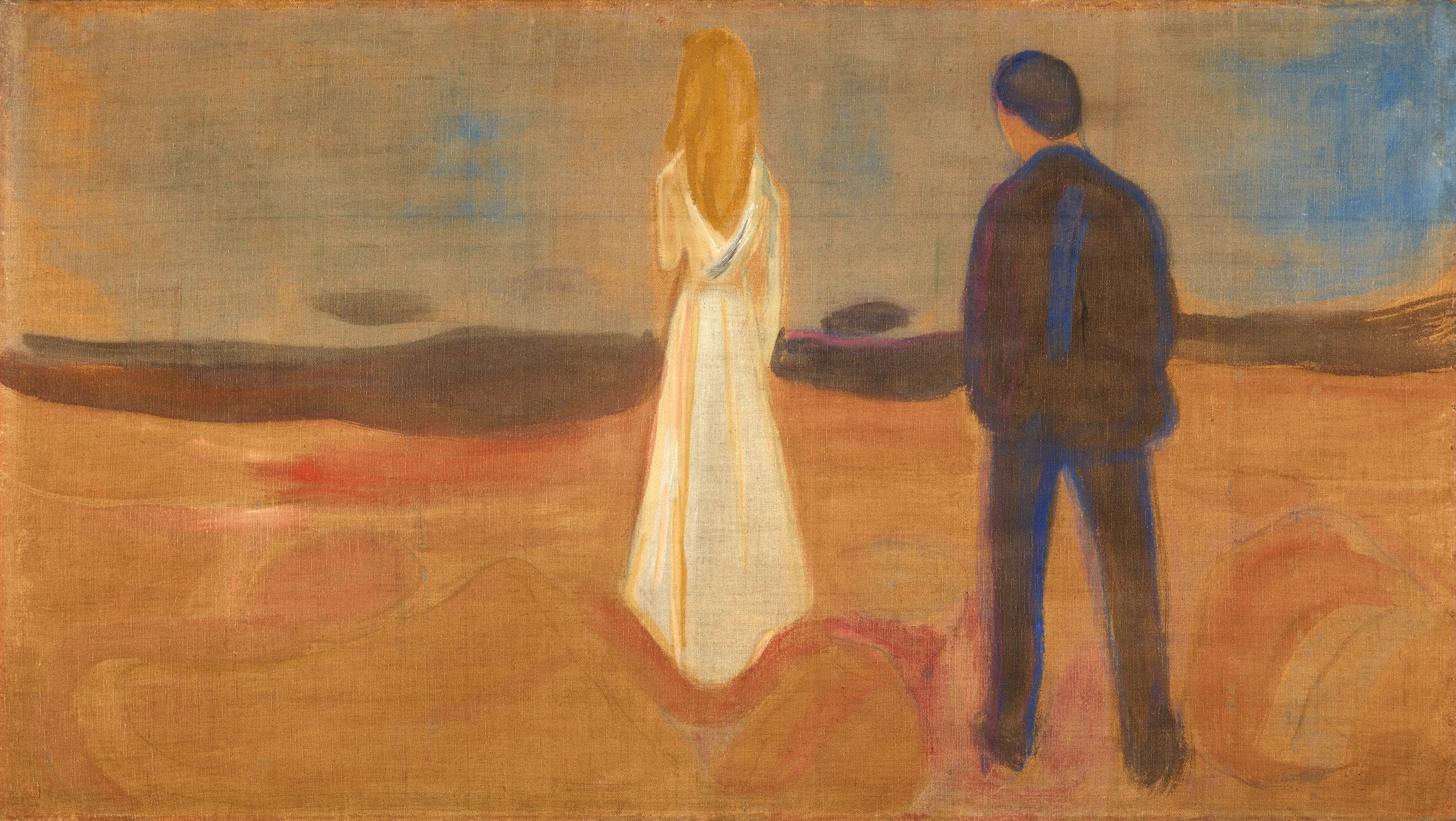
Two Human Beings. The Lonely Ones (Reinhardt-Fries, 1906/07), tempera on canvas, 89.5 × 159.5 cm, Museum Folkwang

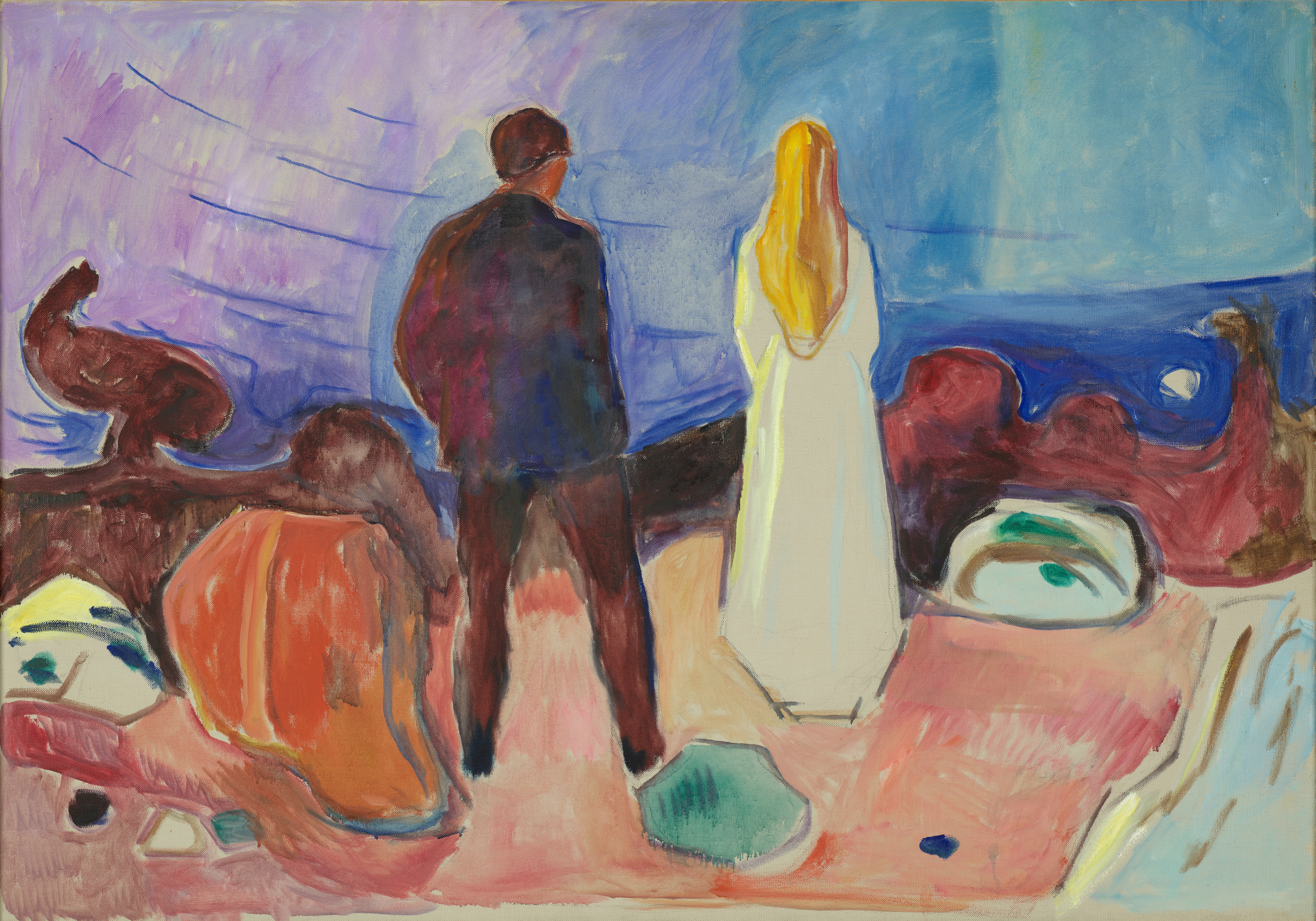
Two Human Beings. The Lonely Ones (1933–35), oil on canvas, 91 × 129.5 cm, Munch Museum, Oslo

== Interpretation ==
=== Eros ===
According to Norwegian art historian Sidsel Helliesen, the two common titles of the motif focus on different levels of the image. Two Human Beings is the factual description of the image's content, while The Lonely Ones conveys the mood of the image. For German art historian Ulrich Bischoff, on the other hand, "the erotic tension is the actual subject of the representation," to which the figures and landscape are subordinate as a "symbolic illustration of natural forces with a sexual character." Norwegian art historian Jens Thiis wrote: "The strong wings of desire rustle over this picture." For Arne Eggum, "a kind of erotic seriousness, a pietism of sensuality" hangs over the Nordic landscape depicted.

Eggum describes Two Human Beings as one of the "love motifs" in Munch's work. The male figure is the painter's alter ego. The brightly dressed female figure is an "image of longing," a "Solveig symbol" of female purity, named after a character from Henrik Ibsen's play Peer Gynt. According to his own notes, she represents the type of woman Munch always regretted not choosing as his partner. The type of female figure dressed in white is frequently found in Munch's work, for example in Woman in Three Stages. Sphinx, The Dance of Life, and Young Girls on a Bridge.

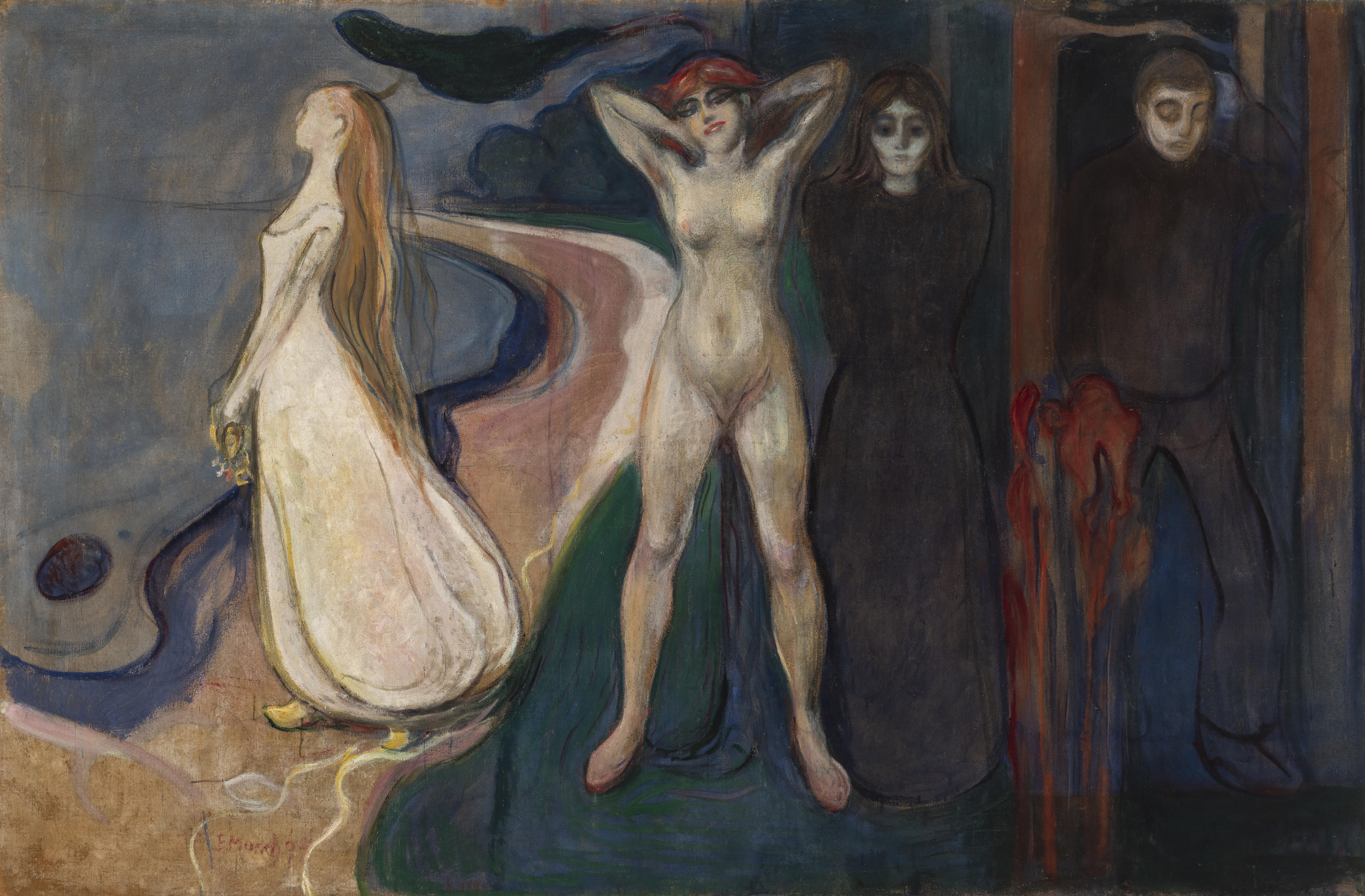
Woman in Three Stages. Sphinx (1894), oil on canvas, 164 × 250 cm, National Gallery of Norway

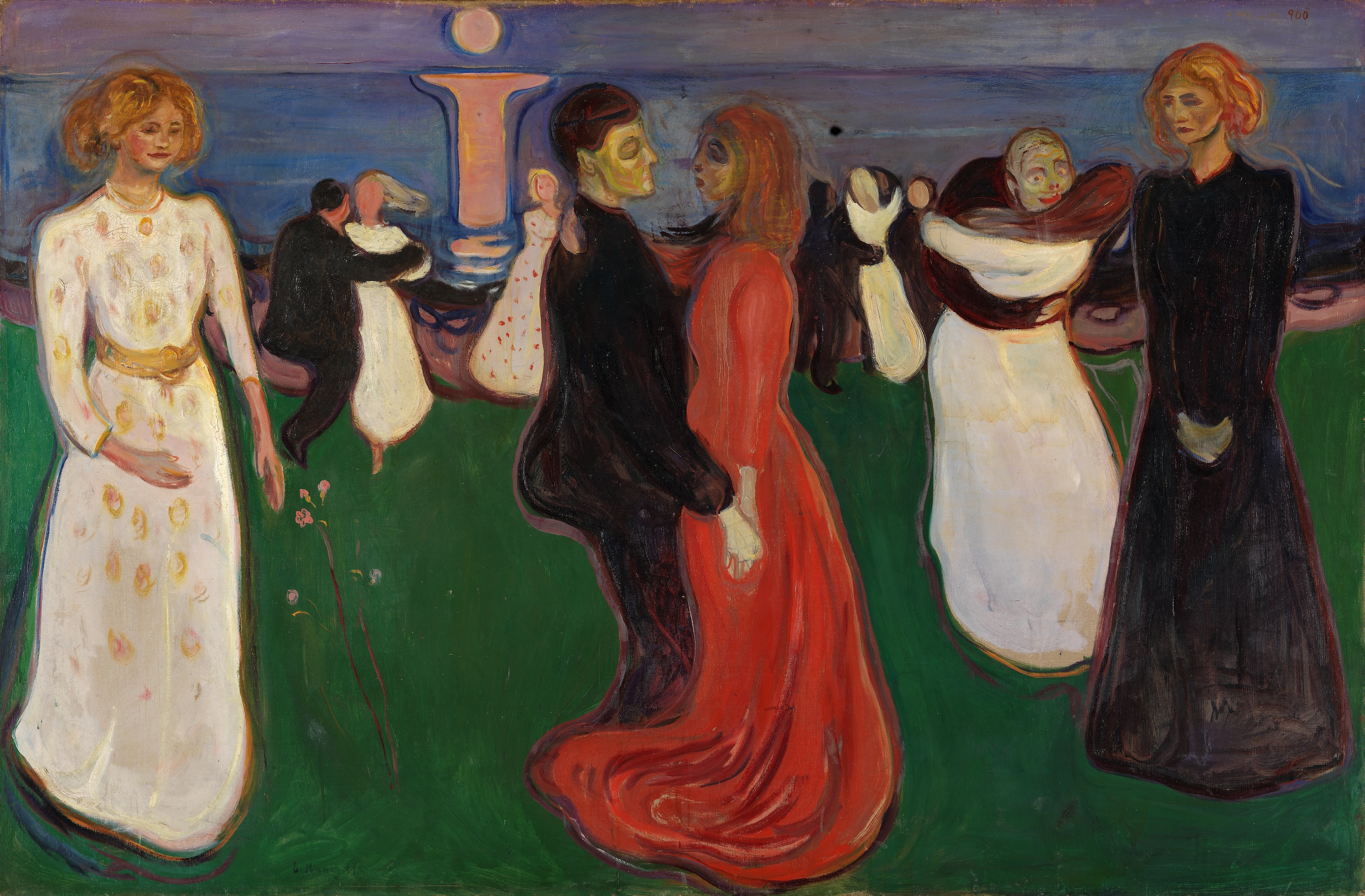
The Dance of Life (1899–1900), oil on canvas, 129 × 191 cm, National Gallery of Norway

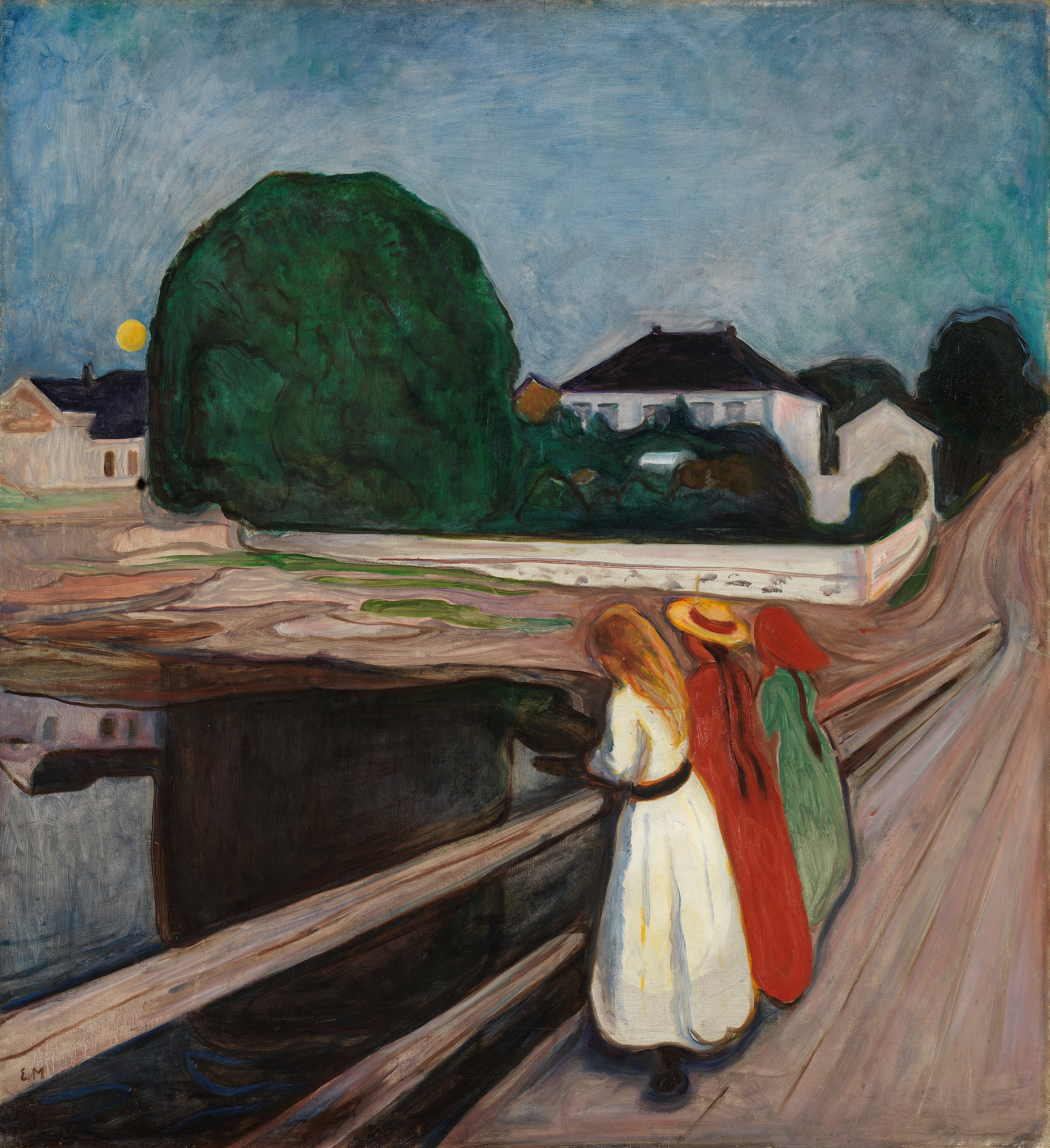
Young Girls on a Bridge (1901), oil on canvas, 136 × 125 cm, National Gallery of Norway, Oslo

In a literary note, Munch described a romantic evening walk on the beach, which Eggum identifies as the inspiration for the motif: "It was evening. I walked along the sea—moonlight between the clouds—the stars swayed over the water, mystical like mermaids, which were large white heads and laughed—some on top of the beach, others down in the water—and she who walked by my side looked like a mermaid—with bright eyes and her open hair shimmering golden in the light of the horizon."

=== Nature mysticism ===
Two Human Beings was often compared to Caspar David Friedrich's paintings, especially his figures immersed in contemplation of nature, such as Two Men by the Sea, The Monk by the Sea, and Man and Woman Contemplating the Moon. However, Friedrich's depictions of nature, rooted in Romanticism, always reveal a belief in a God who manifests himself in nature. The earthly isolation of human beings is thus overcome by a metaphysical connection.

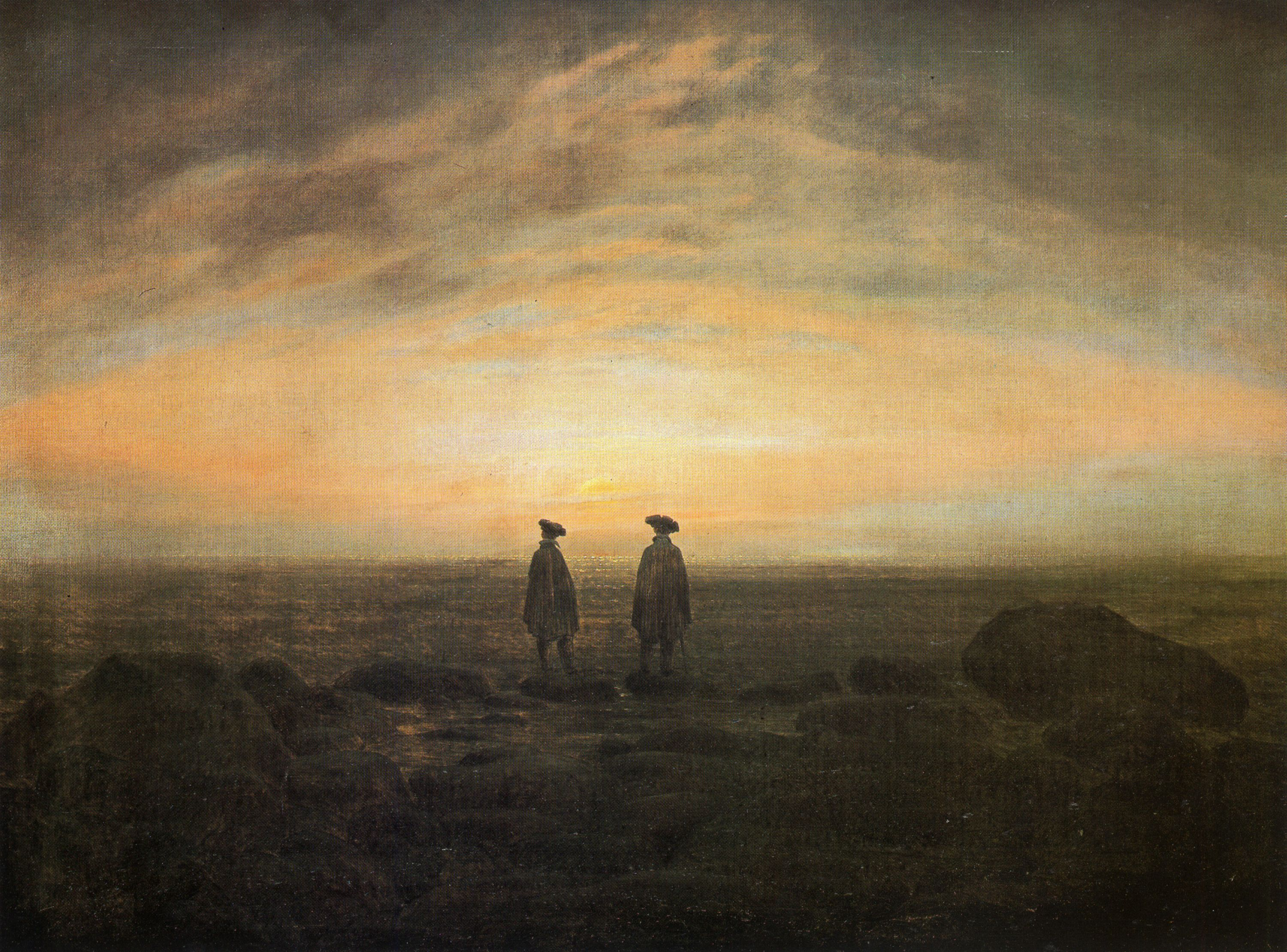
Caspar David Friedrich: Two Men by the Sea (1817), oil on canvas, 51 × 66 cm, Alte Nationalgalerie, Berlin

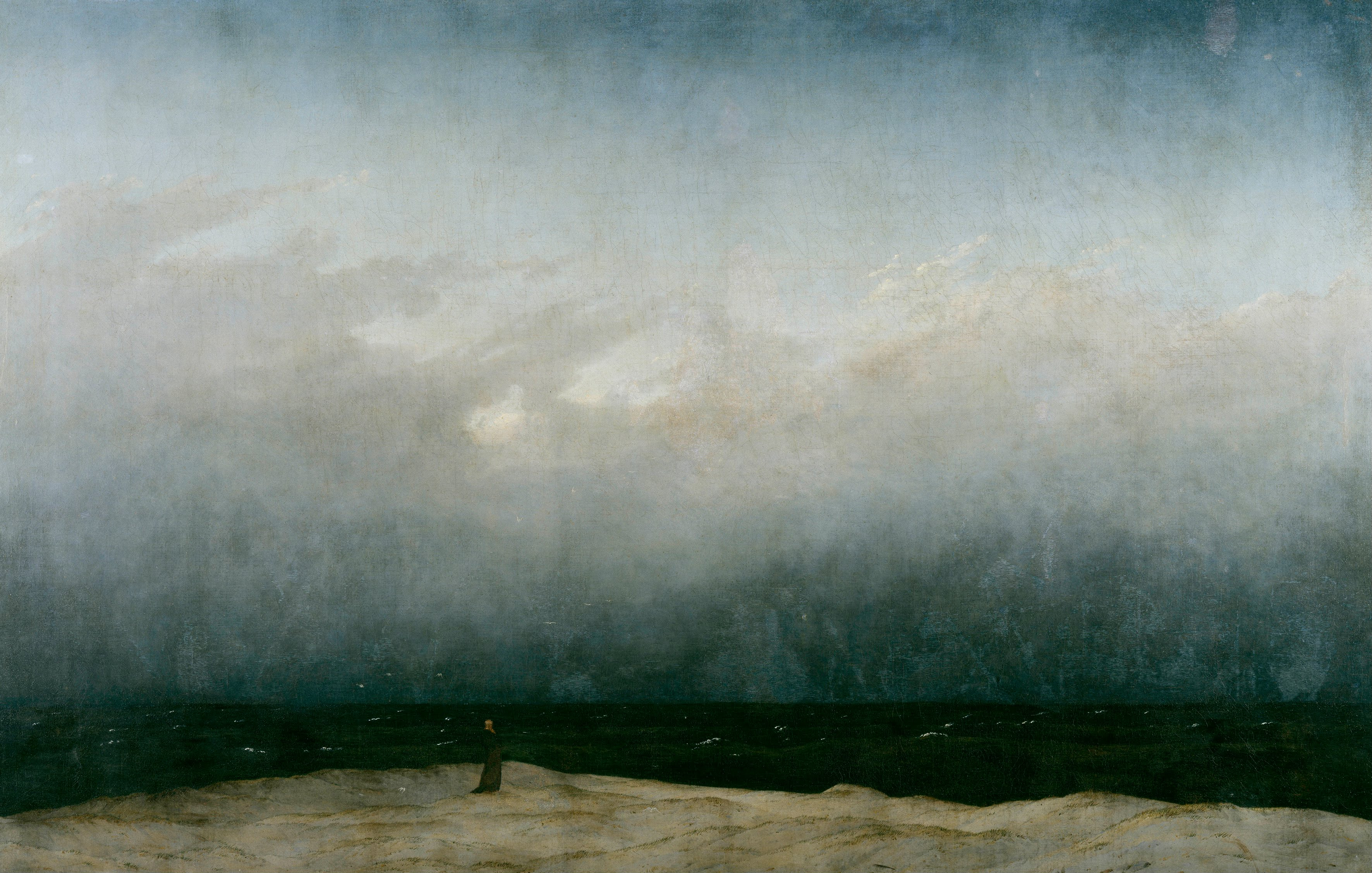
Caspar David Friedrich: The Monk by the Sea (1808–10), oil on canvas, 110 × 171.5 cm, Alte Nationalgalerie, Berlin

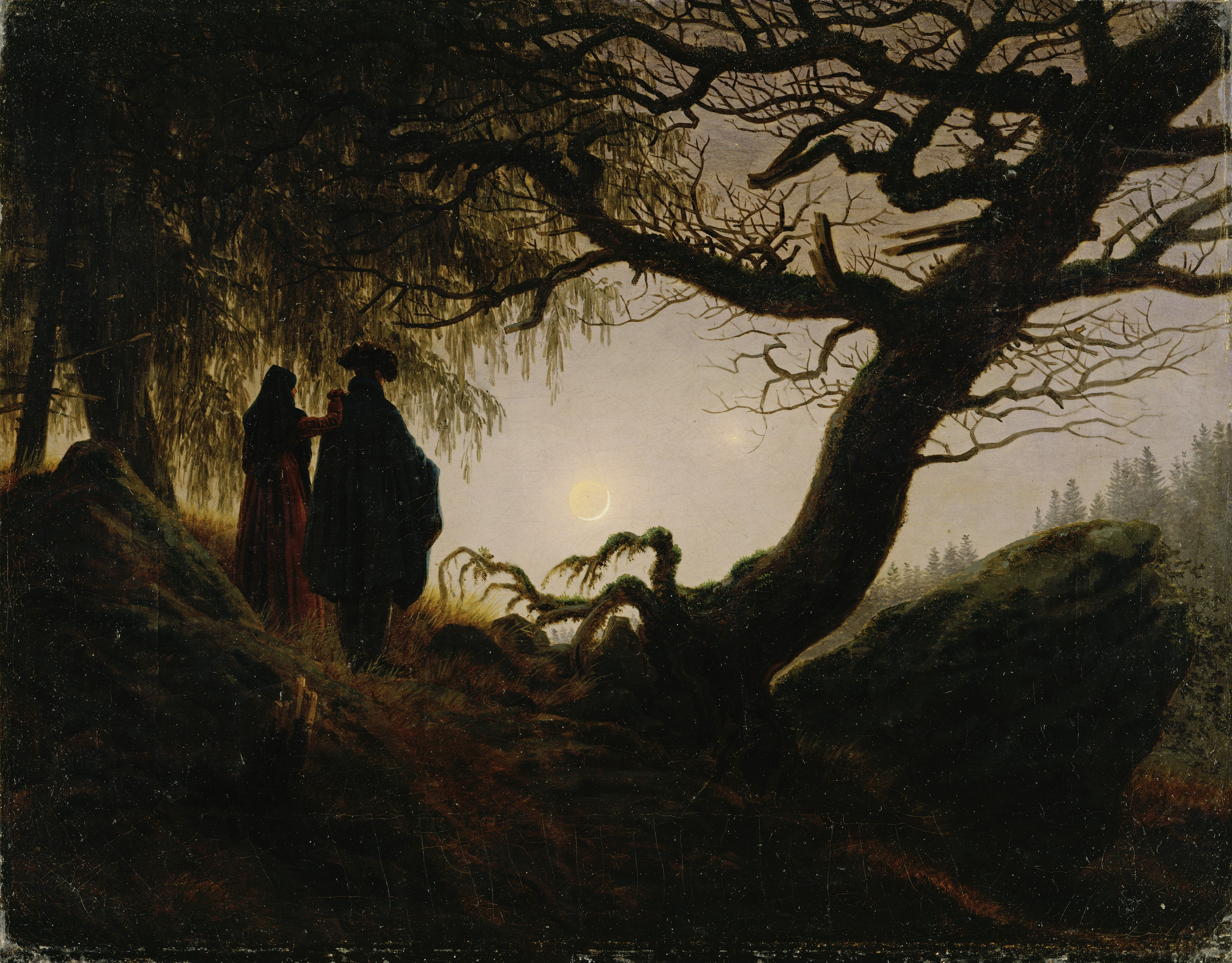
Caspar David Friedrich: Man and Woman Contemplating the Moon (1830–35), oil on canvas, 34 × 44 cm, Alte Nationalgalerie, Berlin

However, according to Reinhold Heller, Munch's lonely figures find no comfort in religion. They remain isolated from one another even in their longings. While the woman is drawn to the sea, the man's longing is directed toward the woman, yet he shies away from union. He sees himself faced with two alternatives: the lure of water as a life-giving element and the "landscape of death" of the moon-pale stones on the beach, which in Munch's imagination transform into fantastical figures such as trolls. These are alternatives that are repeatedly addressed in Munch's work and which seem to be mutually exclusive for the artist: the decision to engage in sexual union to create new life, or renunciation and turning to art, which is imperishable but also lifeless like the boulders.

=== Synthetism ===
While Munch was still experimenting with the styles of Neo-Impressionism and Pointillism in paintings such as Spring Day on Karl Johan Street and Rue Lafayette during what he himself later described as a brief "Impressionist period" in 1890/91 in paintings such as Spring Day on Karl Johan Street or Rue Lafayette, in 1892 he found a new form of expression in the style of Synthetism, an art movement co-founded by Paul Gauguin with simplified outlines and flat forms, with paintings such as Melancholy.

According to Reinhold Heller, in Two Human Beings, Munch applied the teachings of Synthetism to his "idealistic painting" more systematically than ever before. Any illusion of naturalism (spatiality, materiality, physicality, and anatomical and color authenticity) has been banished from the painting, as has anything anecdotal. The figures are not part of a naturalistic landscape, but seem to float in the picture plane, while the artist's creative hand is clearly recognizable, for example in the outlines of the objects. Arne Eggum also concludes that, for the Two Human Beings motif, "the form that gives expression to the idea is, however, inconceivable without the background of French Synthetism."

== Reception ==
In 1963, one hundred years after Munch's birth, the Norwegian postal service Postverket issued a 50-øre stamp featuring his 1899 woodcut Two Human Beings. The Lonely Ones.

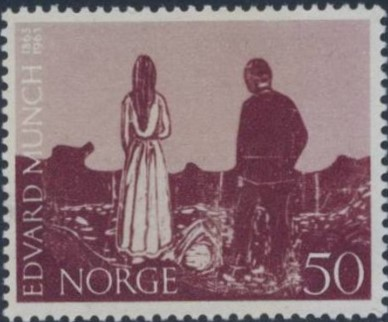
Two Human Beings. The Lonely Ones on a stamp from Posten Norge

== See also ==
- List of paintings by Edvard Munch
- Symbolism (arts)
