= APALA =

APALA or Apala could refer to:

- Apala, a music genre associated with the Yoruba people of Nigeria
- Apala Majumdar, British mathematician
- Asian Pacific American Labor Alliance, a trade union organization
- Asian Pacific American Librarians Association, an affiliate of the American Library Association
- Conocybe apala, a basidiomycete fungus and a member of the genus Conocybe
