= Koivusalo =

Koivusalo is a Finnish surname. Notable people with the surname include:

- Henna Koivusalo (born 1985), Finnish mathematician
- Timo Koivusalo (born 1963), Finnish actor, director, writer, composer and musician
