= Julia Wolf =

British mathematician specialising in arithmetic combinatorics

- Occupation: Professor

Academic background
- Education: Clare College, Cambridge; University of Paris-Sud
- Thesis: Arithmetic Structure in Sets of Integers (2007)
- Doctoral advisor: Timothy Gowers

Academic work
- Main interests: Arithmetic combinatorics
- Website: www.juliawolf.org

Julia Wolf is a British mathematician specialising in arithmetic combinatorics who was the 2016 winner of the Anne Bennett Prize of the London Mathematical Society. She is currently a professor in the Department of Pure Mathematics and Mathematical Statistics at the University of Cambridge.

== Education and career ==
Wolf writes that her childhood ambition was to become a carpenter, and that she became attracted to science only after subscribing to Scientific American as a teenager.

She read mathematics at Clare College, Cambridge, completing the Mathematical Tripos in 2003. She remained at Cambridge for graduate study, and completed her PhD there in 2008. Her dissertation, Arithmetic Structure in Sets of Integers, was supervised by Timothy Gowers. She was also mentored in her doctoral studies by Ben Green, whom she met when he was a postdoctoral researcher at Cambridge from 2001 to 2005.

Since earning her doctorate she has been a postdoctoral fellow at the Mathematical Sciences Research Institute in Berkeley, California, Triennial assistant professor at Rutgers University in New Jersey, Hadamard associate professor at the École Polytechnique in Paris (earning a habilitation at the University of Paris-Sud in 2012), and Heilbronn reader in combinatorics and number theory at the University of Bristol. She returned to Cambridge as a university lecturer in 2018, and was a Fellow of Clare College from 2018 to 2022.

== Recognition ==
In 2016 the London Mathematical Society gave Wolf their Anne Bennett Prize "in recognition of her outstanding contributions to additive number theory, combinatorics and harmonic analysis and to the mathematical community." The award citation particularly cited her work with Gowers on counting solutions to systems of linear equations over abelian groups, and her work on quadratic analogues of the Goldreich–Levin theorem.
