= Anne Bennett Prize =

Award given by London Mathematical Society

- Awarded for: Work in and influence on mathematics, particularly acting as an inspiration for women mathematicians.
- Location: London, UK
- Country: United Kingdom
- Presented by: London Mathematical Society (LMS)
- Status: Active
- Website: www.lms.ac.uk/prizes/lms-prizes

The Anne Bennett Prize and Senior Anne Bennett Prize are awards given by the London Mathematical Society.

In every third year, the society offers the Senior Anne Bennett prize to a mathematician normally based in the United Kingdom for work in, influence on or service to mathematics, particularly in relation to advancing the careers of women in mathematics.

In the two years out of three in which the Senior Anne Bennett Prize is not awarded, the society offers the Anne Bennett Prize to a mathematician within ten years of their doctorate for work in and influence on mathematics, particularly acting as an inspiration for women mathematicians.

Both prizes are awarded in memory of Anne Bennett, an administrator for the London Mathematical Society who died in 2012. The prize was established in 2013 and first given in 2014.

The Anne Bennett Prizes should be distinguished from the Anne Bennett Memorial Award for Distinguished Service of the Royal Society of Chemistry, for which Anne Bennett also worked.

== Anne Bennett Prize Winners ==
The winners of the Anne Bennett Prize have been:

- 2015 Apala Majumdar, in recognition of her outstanding contributions to the mathematics of liquid crystals and to the liquid crystal community.
- 2016 Julia Wolf, in recognition of her outstanding contributions to additive number theory, combinatorics and harmonic analysis and to the mathematical community.
- 2018 Lotte Hollands, in recognition of her outstanding research at the interface between quantum theory and geometry and of her leadership in mathematical outreach activities.
- 2019 Eva-Maria Graefe, in recognition of her outstanding research in quantum theory and the inspirational role she has played among female students and early career researchers in mathematics and physics.
- 2021 Viveka Erlandsson, "for her outstanding achievements in geometry and topology and her inspirational active role in promoting women mathematicians".
- 2022 Asma Hassannezhad, "for her outstanding work in spectral geometry and her substantial contributions toward the advancement of women in mathematics."
- 2024 Ana Ros Camacho, "for her ground-breaking work on categorical proofs of the Landau–Ginzburg/Conformal Field Theory correspondence and her tireless dedication to the advancement of women in mathematical physics"
- 2025 Henna Koivusalo, "for her work on cut-and-project sets, dynamical systems and fractals and her dedication to the advancement of women in mathematics."

== Senior Anne Bennett Prize Winners ==
The winners of the Senior Anne Bennett Prize have been:

- 2014 Caroline Series, in recognition of her leading contributions to hyperbolic geometry and symbolic dynamics, and of the major impact of her numerous initiatives towards the advancement of women in mathematics.
- 2017 Alison Etheridge, in recognition of her outstanding research on measure-valued stochastic processes and applications to population biology; and for her impressive leadership and service to the profession.
- 2020 Peter Clarkson, "in recognition of his tireless work to support gender equality in UK mathematics, and particularly for his leadership in developing good practice among departments of mathematical sciences".
- 2023 Eugénie Hunsicker, "for her outstanding work to improve equality and diversity in the mathematical community and for the depth of her mathematical achievements across an impressive range of areas, from L2 Hodge theory to data science."

== See also ==
- List of mathematics awards
