= Eva-Maria Graefe =

German mathematical physicist

Eva-Maria Graefe is a German mathematical physicist who works as a reader in mathematical physics at Imperial College London and as a University Research Fellow of the Royal Society. Her research involves ultracold atoms and non-Hermitian quantum mechanics, an area she describes informally as the study of "holes in quantum systems" by which dissipation degrades their quantum behavior.

== Education and career ==
Graefe studied physics at the University of Kaiserslautern, completing her doctorate there in 2009. Her dissertation, Quantum-classical correspondence for a Bose-Hubbard dimer and its non-Hermitian generalisation, was supervised by Hans-Jürgen Korsch.

She did postdoctoral research in quantum chaos at the University of Bristol before joining Imperial College. There, she was supported as a L'Oréal-UNESCO For Women in Science Fellow prior to her position as a Royal Society University Research Fellow.

== Recognition ==
Graefe is the 2019 winner of the Anne Bennett Prize of the London Mathematical Society, "in recognition of her outstanding research in quantum theory and the inspirational role she has played among female students and early career researchers in mathematics and physics". The award cited her work with Hans-Jürgen Korsch on mean-field approximation of parity-time symmetric Bose–Einstein condensates, her work with G. Demange on the exceptional points of non-Hermitian operators, and her work with R. Schubert on semiclassical limits of non-Hermitian quantum mechanics.
