= Asma Hassannezhad =

Iranian mathematician

Asma Hassannezhad is an Iranian mathematician whose research concerns geometric analysis, spectral geometry, and differential geometry. She is a lecturer in pure mathematics in the School of Mathematics at the University of Bristol, where she is also a member of the Institute of Probability, Analysis and Dynamics and the Institute of Pure Mathematics.

== Education ==
Hassannezhad has a bachelor's and master's degree from Sharif University of Technology in Iran. She completed her Ph.D. in 2012, jointly through Sharif University, the University of Neuchâtel in Switzerland, and the University of Tours in France. Her dissertation, Bornes supérieures pour les valeurs propres d'opérateurs naturels sur Les variétés riemanniennes compactes, was jointly supervised by Bruno Colbois of Neuchâtel, Ahmad El Soufi of Tours, and Alireza Ranjbar-Motlagh of Sharif.

== Recognition ==
Hassannezhad was the 2022 winner of the Anne Bennett Prize "for her outstanding work in spectral geometry and her substantial contributions toward the advancement of women in mathematics".
