= Henna Koivusalo =

Finnish mathematician

Henna L. L. Koivusalo (born 1985) is a Finnish mathematician who works in the UK as a lecturer at the School of Mathematics of the University of Bristol. Her research involves dynamical systems, fractal geometry, Diophantine approximation, and the cut-and-project method for generating aperiodic tilings and quasicrystals.

== Education and career ==
Koivusalo received bachelor's and master's degrees in mathematics from the University of Jyväskylä in 2009. She went on to doctoral study in mathematics at the University of Oulu, and completed her Ph.D. in 2013. Her doctoral dissertation, Dimensions of random fractals, was jointly supervised by Esa and Maarit Järvenpää.

She was a postdoctoral researcher at the University of York from 2013 to 2016, and from 2016 to 2020 worked towards a habilitation at the University of Vienna. She has been a lecturer at the University of Bristol since 2020.

== Recognition ==
Koivusalo is the 2025 recipient of the Anne Bennett Prize of the London Mathematical Society, awarded "for her work on cut-and-project sets, dynamical systems and fractals and her dedication to the advancement of women in mathematics".
