= Viveka Erlandsson =

Swedish mathematician

Viveka Erlandsson is a Swedish mathematician specialising in low-dimensional topology and geometry, and known in particular for extending the work of Maryam Mirzakhani on counting geodesics on hyperbolic manifolds. She is a lecturer at the University of Bristol and in a part position an associate professor at UiT The Arctic University of Norway.

== Education and career ==
Erlandsson earned a bachelor's degree in applied mathematics from San Francisco State University in 2004, and continued at the same university for a master's degree in 2006. She became a lecturer at Baruch College and Hunter College in the City University of New York system, while pursuing a doctorate in mathematics through the Graduate Center of the City University of New York, which she completed in 2013. Her dissertation, The Margulis region in hyperbolic 4-space, was supervised by Ara Basmajian.

After postdoctoral research at Aalto University and the University of Helsinki in Finland, she became a lecturer in mathematics at the University of Bristol in 2017.

== Book ==
Erlandsson is the coauthor of the book Geodesic Currents and Mirzakhani’s Curve Counting, with Juan Souto, to be published by Springer in 2022.

== Recognition ==
Erlandsson is the 2021 winner of the Anne Bennett Prize of the London Mathematical Society, given to her "for her outstanding achievements in geometry and topology and her inspirational active role in promoting women mathematicians". She was a 2024 recipient of the Whitehead Prize, "for her outstanding work on curve counting on surfaces" and for her "extraordinary rigidity theorem for bounce sequences associated to billiard tables".
