= Ana Ros Camacho =

Spanish mathematical physicist

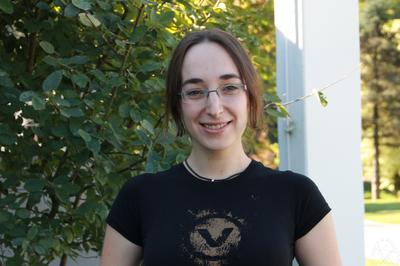
Ros Camacho at Oberwolfach in 2013

Ana Ros Camacho is a Spanish mathematician and mathematical physicist known for her work on connections between the Ginzburg–Landau theory of superconductors and conformal field theory in quantum mechanics. She works in the UK as lecturer in the School of Mathematics at Cardiff University.

== Education and career ==
Ros Camacho earned a licenciate in physics from the University of Barcelona in 2009. She went to the University of Hamburg in Germany for continued study in mathematical physics, earning a master's degree in 2011 and completing her doctorate (Dr. rer. nat.) in 2014. Her dissertation, Matrix factorizations and the Landau-Ginzburg/conformal field theory correspondence, was supervised by Ingo Runkel.

After postdoctoral research at the Max Planck Institute for Mathematics in Germany from 2014 to 2015, and at the Institut de mathématiques de Jussieu – Paris Rive Gauche from 2015 to 2016, she became a junior lecturer in the mathematics institute of Utrecht University in The Netherlands beginning in 2016. There, she was supported by a Marie Sklodowska-Curie Fellowship and a Veni grant of the Dutch Research Council. In 2020, she moved to her present position as a lecturer in the School of Mathematics at Cardiff University.

== Recognition ==
Utrecht University gave Ros Camacho their Westerdijk Award, for work "to create a more diverse organisation", including mentoring Spanish-speaking students and encouraging work by women in mathematics and mathematical physics, in 2019. In 2022, she was recognized by Cardiff University by their award for Champion for Equality, Diversity and Inclusion.

The London Mathematical Society awarded Ros Camacho their 2024 Anne Bennett Prize, "for her ground-breaking work on categorical proofs of the Landau–Ginzburg/Conformal Field Theory correspondence and her tireless dedication to the advancement of women in mathematical physics".
