= The Dance of Life (Munch) =

Painting by Edvard Munch

Dance of Life
- Livets dans
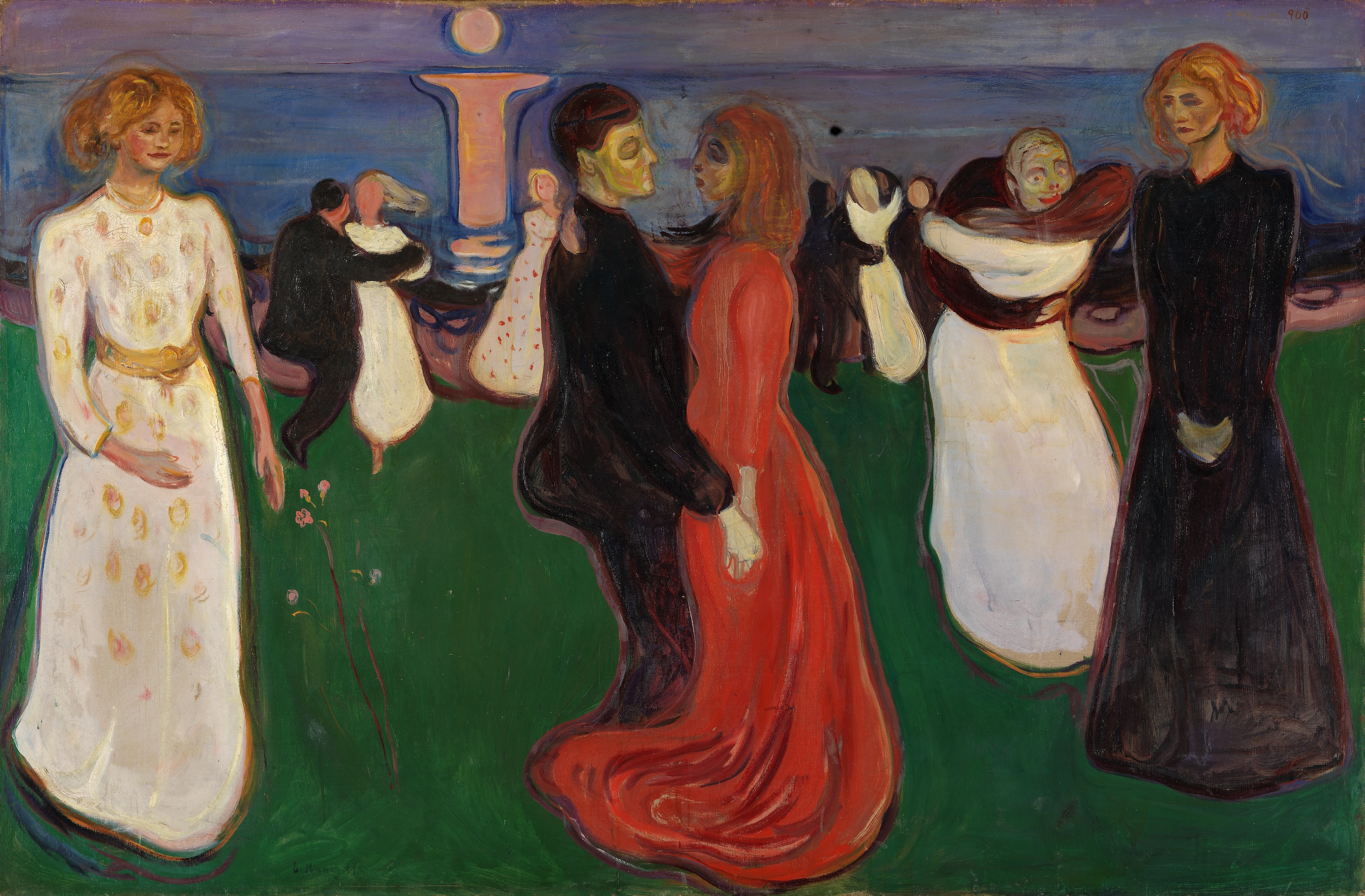
- Artist: Edvard Munch
- Year: 1899-1900
- Medium: Oil on canvas
- Dimensions: 125 x 191 cm
- Location: National Museum of Norway, Oslo

The Dance of Life or Life's Dance is an 1899–1900 expressionist painting by Edvard Munch, now in the National Museum of Norway, in Oslo. Olaf Schou purchased the painting in Oslo in 1910, immediately presenting it to the National Gallery.

== History and description ==
The painting was an important work in Munch's project The Frieze of Life, which played with themes of love, sexual anxiety, and death. In creating the painting, Munch was allegedly inspired by the 1898 Helge Rode play Dansen gaar, of which Munch kept a copy in his personal library. This painting possibly reflects Munch's feelings towards the women in his life. He had a history of love affairs ending in heartbreak.

The painting's subject is of several couples dancing on grass by water. The moon is visible, and its reflection on the water creates a phallic symbol. Two women stand alone, one young and in white, and one older and in black. The stages of life are represented by a young virgin in white, a mature woman dressed in red, and an old widow in black.

In 2026, Madonna referenced the painting in the lyrics of "One Step Away", the third track from her fifteenth studio album, Confessions II.

"One step away from your freedom
One breath away from the dance of life
One step away from your heartbeat
One step away, yeah, you're one step away."

Following renewed attention to the painting, it has been referenced in contemporary popular culture. In 2026, writer George Vilorio referenced the painting in the title of his Substack chapter, The Lonesome Dance of Life, from his memoir Fragments of an Adolescent Soul.

== See also ==
- List of paintings by Edvard Munch

== Sources ==
- http://www.edvard-munch.com/
