= Young Girls on a Bridge =

Painting by Edvard Munch

Young Girls on a Bridge is the title of twelve works by Edvard Munch produced over the course of his lifetime, particularly between 1886 and 1927. They all show a bridge in Åsgårdstrand, a bathing station on the Oslofjord, where the artist spent several summers, a very short season in Norway. Each shows a particular emotion of the artist, with the 1901 version (now in the National Gallery in Oslo) for instance showing the same composition as that of 1927 but with completely different colouring.

Another version was produced for the "salon des indépendants" in Paris in 1903, from which it was bought by Mikhail Morozov - it is now in the Pushkin Museum in Moscow. Other version, produced in 1902, was bought at Sotheby's New York on 14 November 2016 for $54.5 million by Hasso Plattner.

== Image gallery ==
The paintings and their number as listed in the list of paintings by Edvard Munch

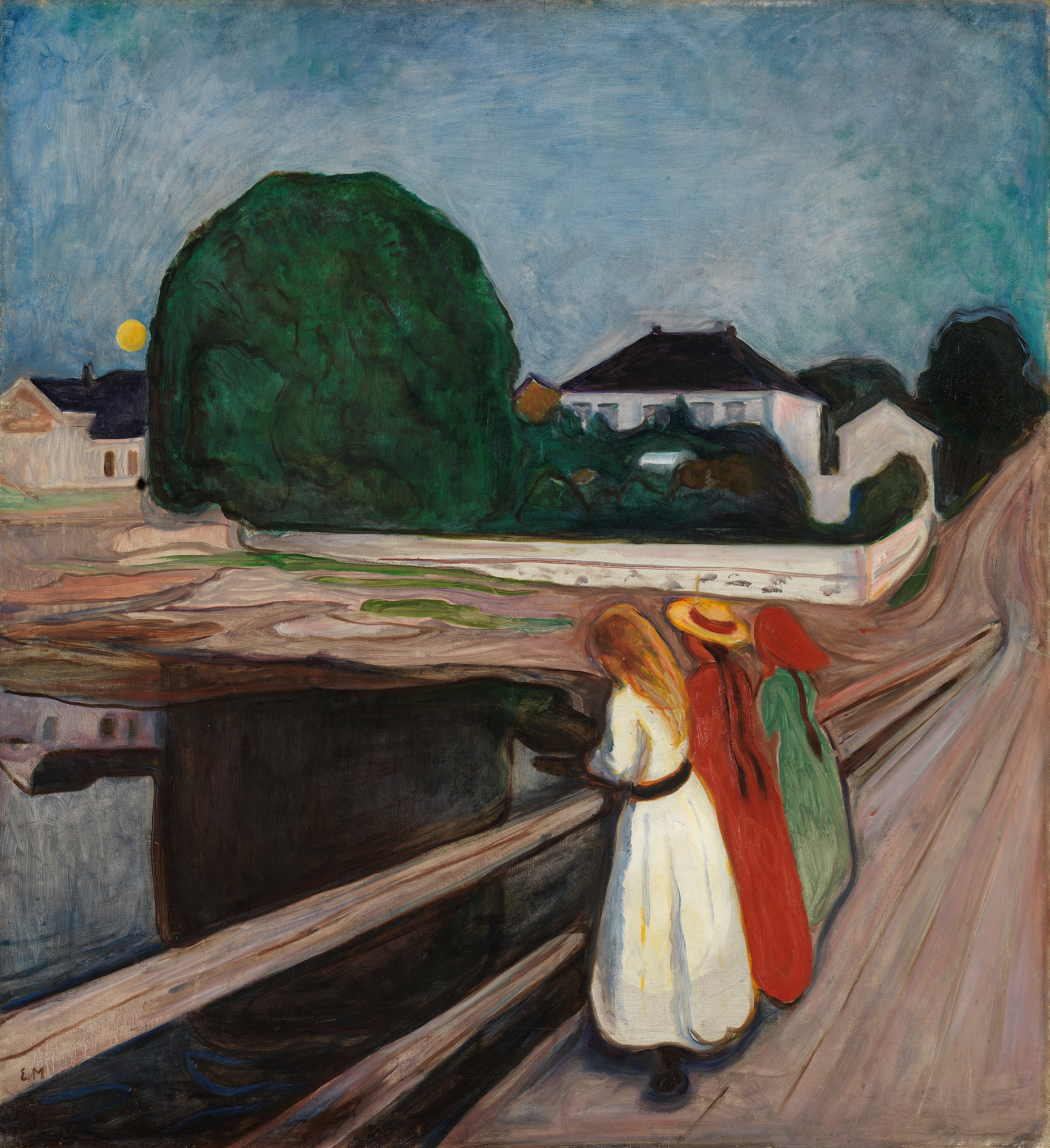
483: 1901, located at the National Gallery, Oslo

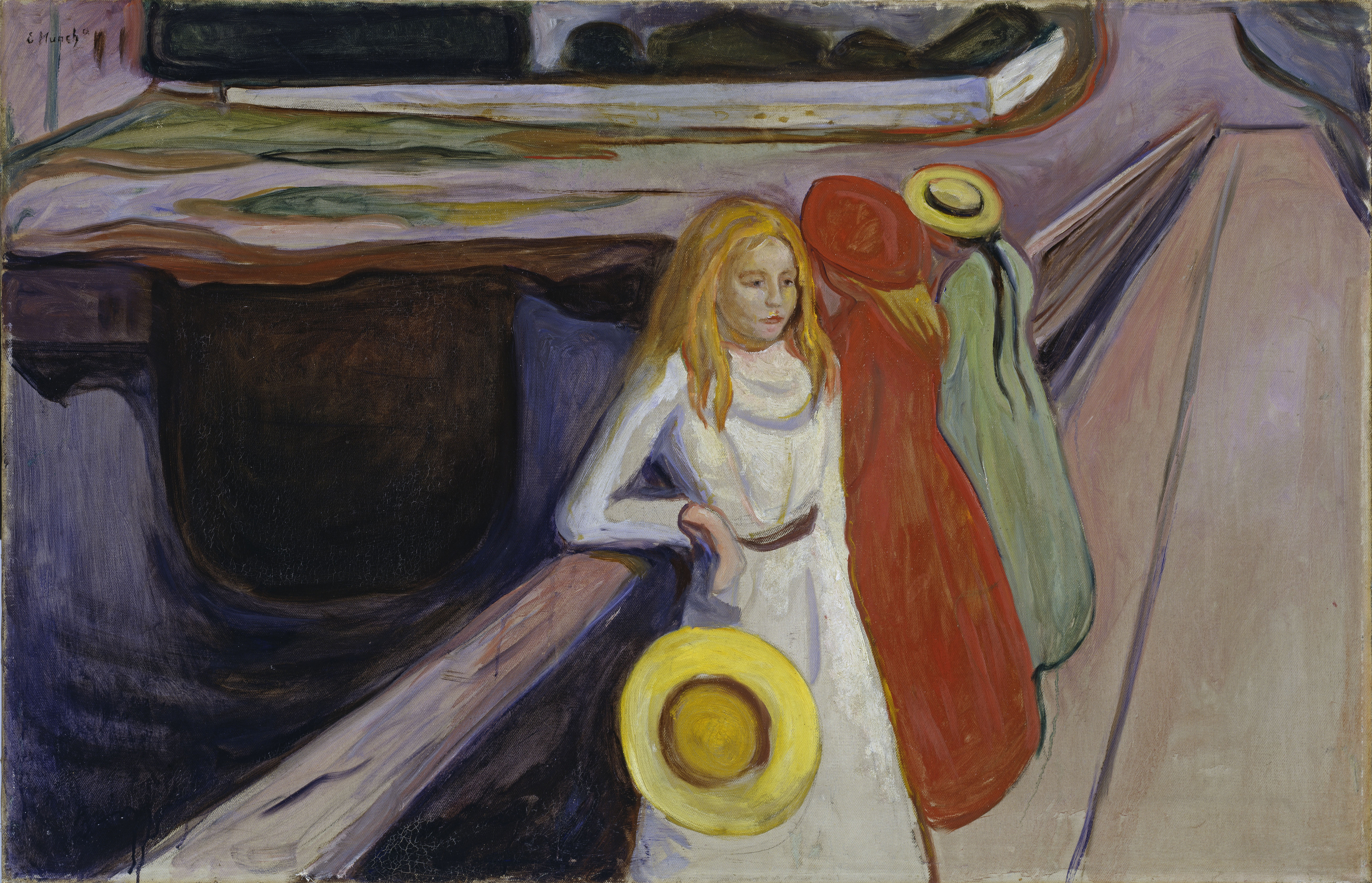
484: 1901, located at Hamburger Kunsthalle, Hamburg, Germany

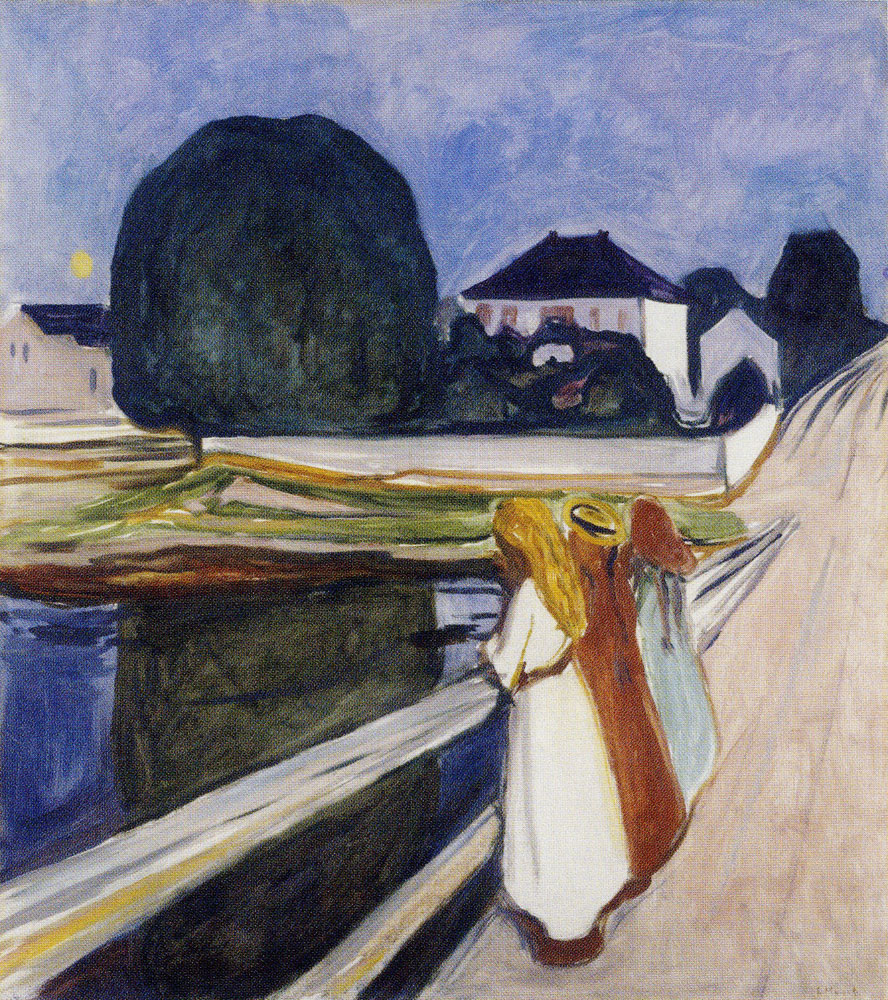
539: 1902, located at The Pushkin Museum of Fine Arts, Moscow, Russia

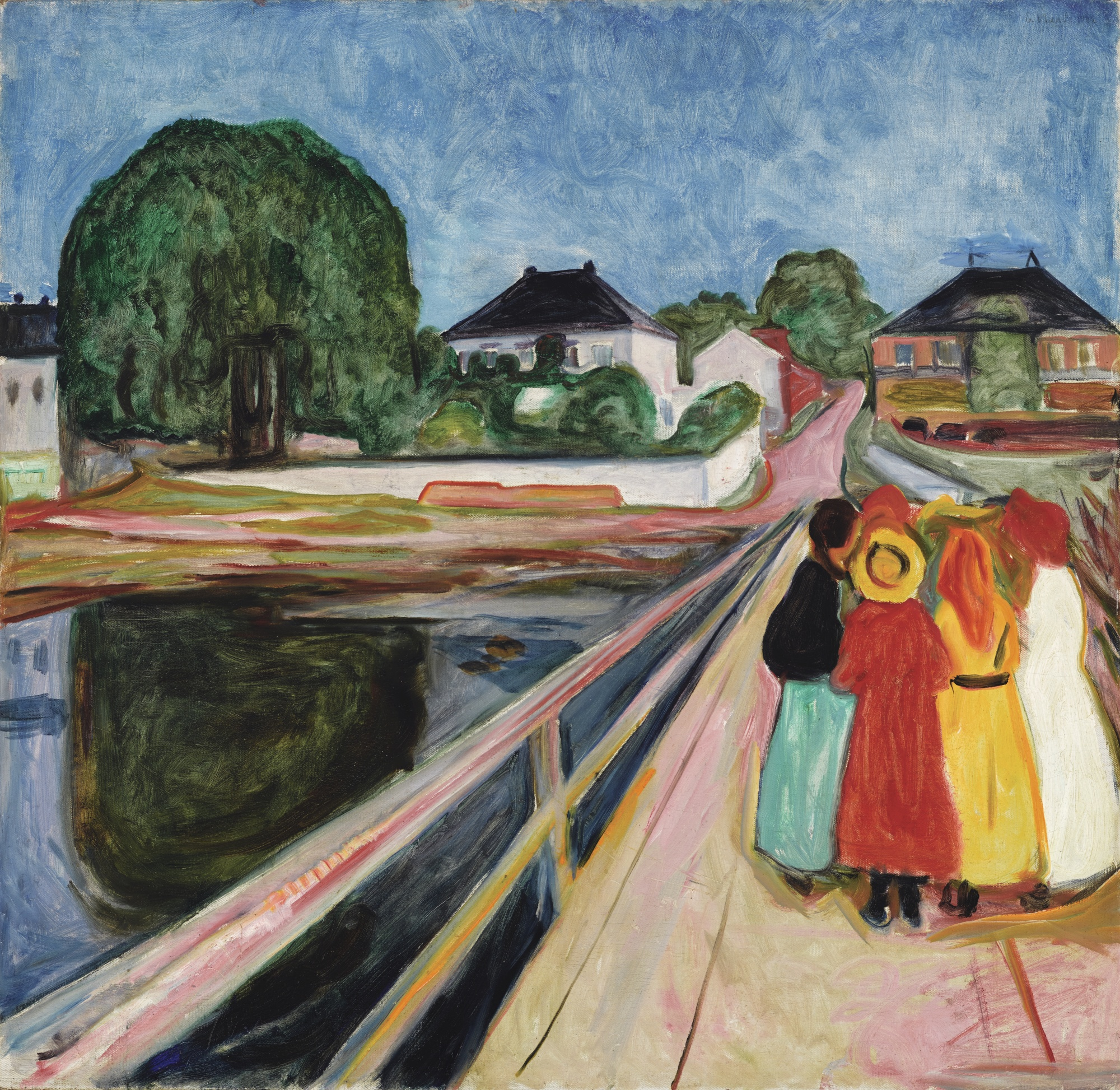
540: 1902, private collection. This version that sold for $54.5 million

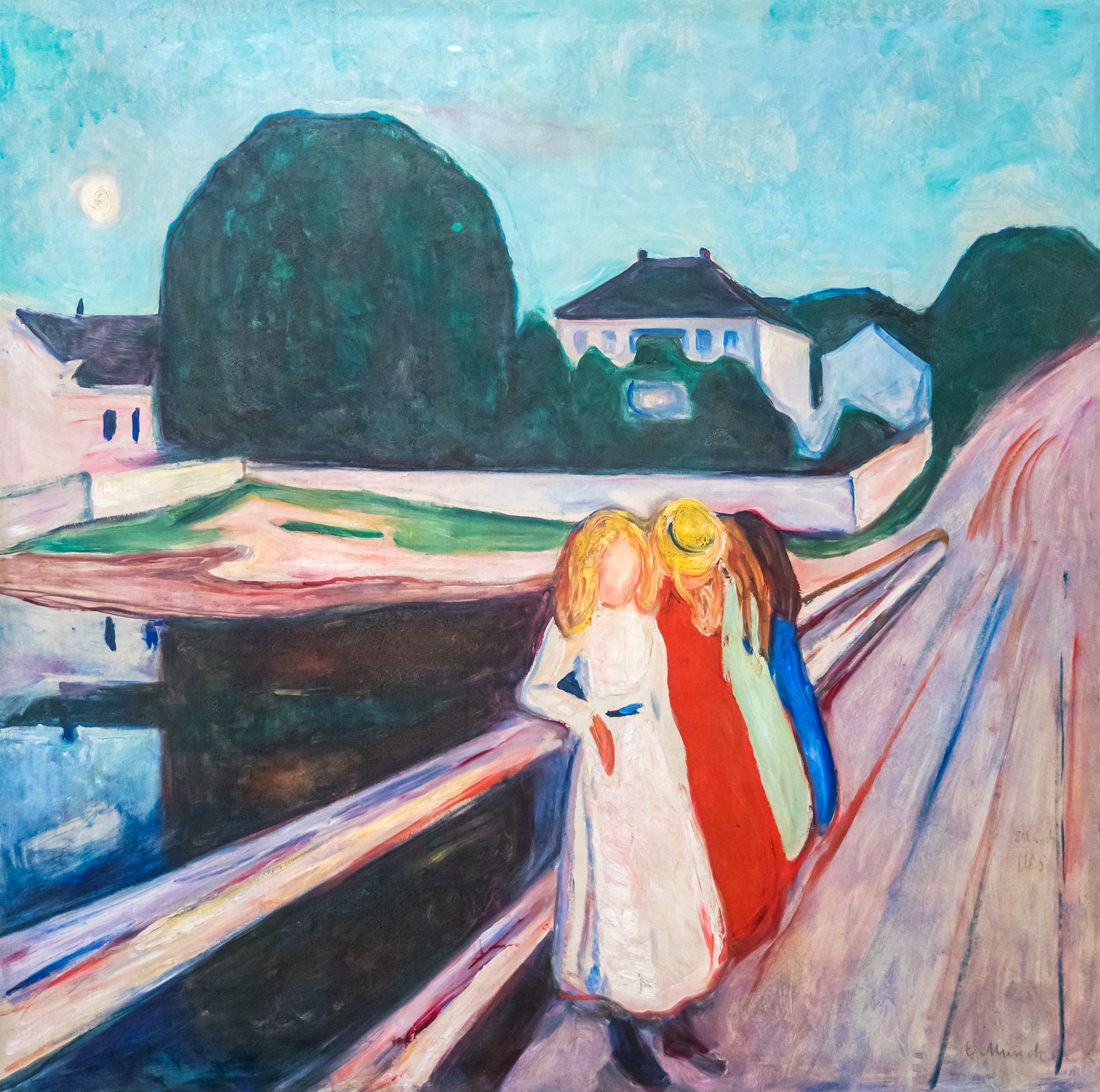
639: 1905, located at Wallraf-Richartz Museum, Cologne, Germany

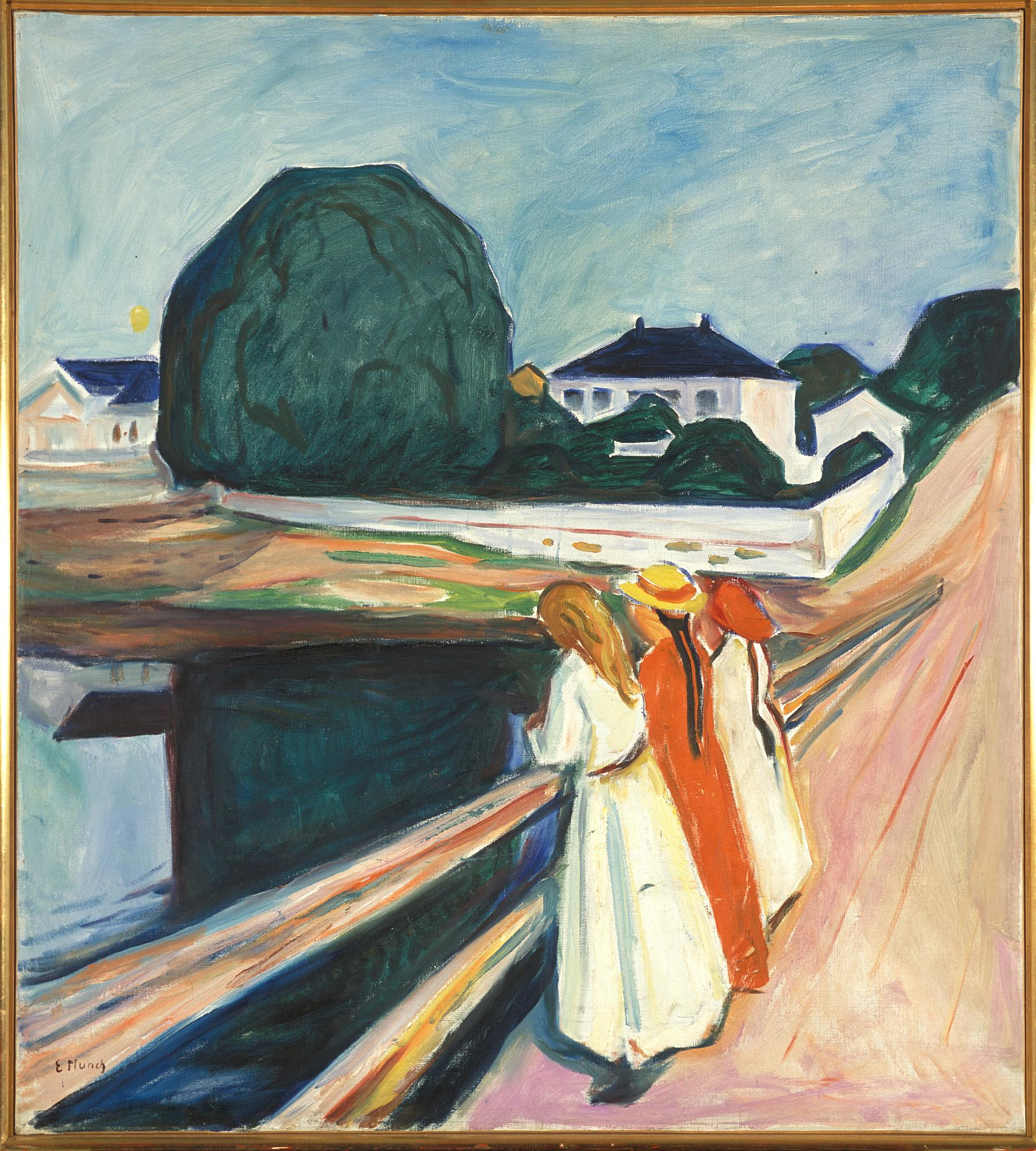
1632: 1927, located at Munch Museum in Oslo

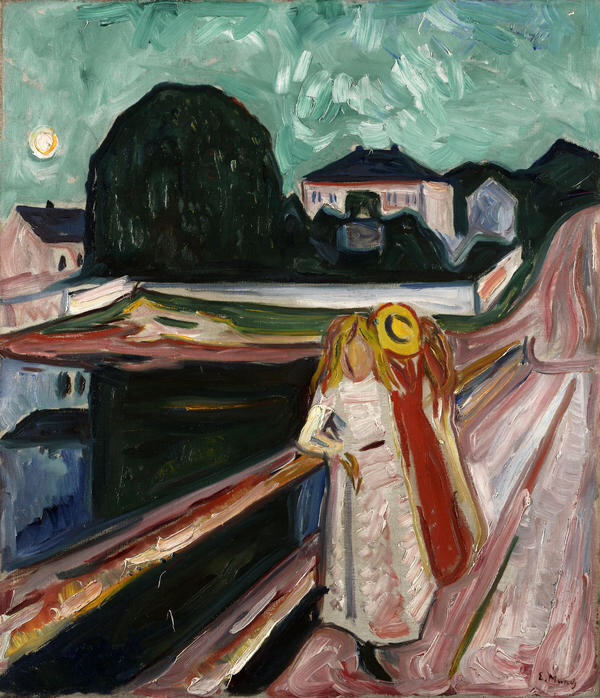
1715: 1933–35, located at Kimbell Art Museum, Fort Worth, Texas, USA

== See also ==
- List of paintings by Edvard Munch
