= Maarit Järvenpää =

Finnish mathematician

Maarit Järvenpää is a Finnish mathematician specializing in fractal geometry, geometric measure theory, and dynamical systems. She is a professor of mathematics and dean of the Faculty of Natural Sciences at the University of Oulu.

== Education and career ==
Järvenpää has a Ph.D. from the University of Jyväskylä, completed in 1994. Her doctoral dissertation, On the Upper Minkowski Dimension, the Packing Dimension, and Orthogonal Projections, was supervised by Pertti Mattila.

At the time when she was hired as a full professor at the University of Oulu in 2009, she was one of only two women mathematics professors in Finland.

== Recognition ==
Järvenpää was named to the Finnish Academy of Science and Letters in 2019.
