= Apala Majumdar =

British applied mathematician

- Born: Airdrie, Scotland
- Education: University of Bristol
- Scientific career
- Fields: Liquid crystals
- Workplaces: University of Oxford; University of Bath; University of Strathclyde; University of Manchester
- Thesis: Liquid crystals and tangent unit-vector fields in polyhedral geometries (2006)
- Doctoral advisor: Jonathan Robbins; Maxim Zyskin

Apala Majumdar is a British applied mathematician specialising in the mathematics of liquid crystals. She is a professor of Applied Mathematics at the Department of Mathematics, University of Manchester.

== Education and career ==
Majumdar did her undergraduate studies at the University of Bristol. As a graduate student at Bristol, she also worked with Hewlett Packard Laboratories. She was awarded a PhD in applied mathematics at the University of Bristol in 2006; her dissertation, Liquid crystals and tangent unit-vector fields in polyhedral geometries, was jointly supervised by Jonathan Robbins and Maxim Zyskin.

After working as a Royal Commission of the Exhibition of 1851 Research Fellow at the University of Oxford, she moved to the University of Bath in 2012, having been awarded a 5-year EPSRC Career Acceleration Fellowship in 2011. At Bath she became a Reader and the Director of the Centre for Nonlinear Mechanics (2018-2019). In 2019 she was appointed as a professor of Applied Mathematics at the University of Strathclyde and moved to University of Manchester in 2025.

== Recognition ==
The British Liquid Crystal Society gave Majumdar their Young Scientist Award in 2012. The London Mathematical Society gave her their Anne Bennett Prize in 2015. In 2019 she was the winner of the academic category of the FDM Everywoman in Technology Awards. In 2024, she was elected as a fellow of the Royal Society of Edinburgh.
