= Oldmasters Museum =

Art museum in Brussels, Belgium

- Musée Oldmasters (French); Oldmasters Museum (Dutch)
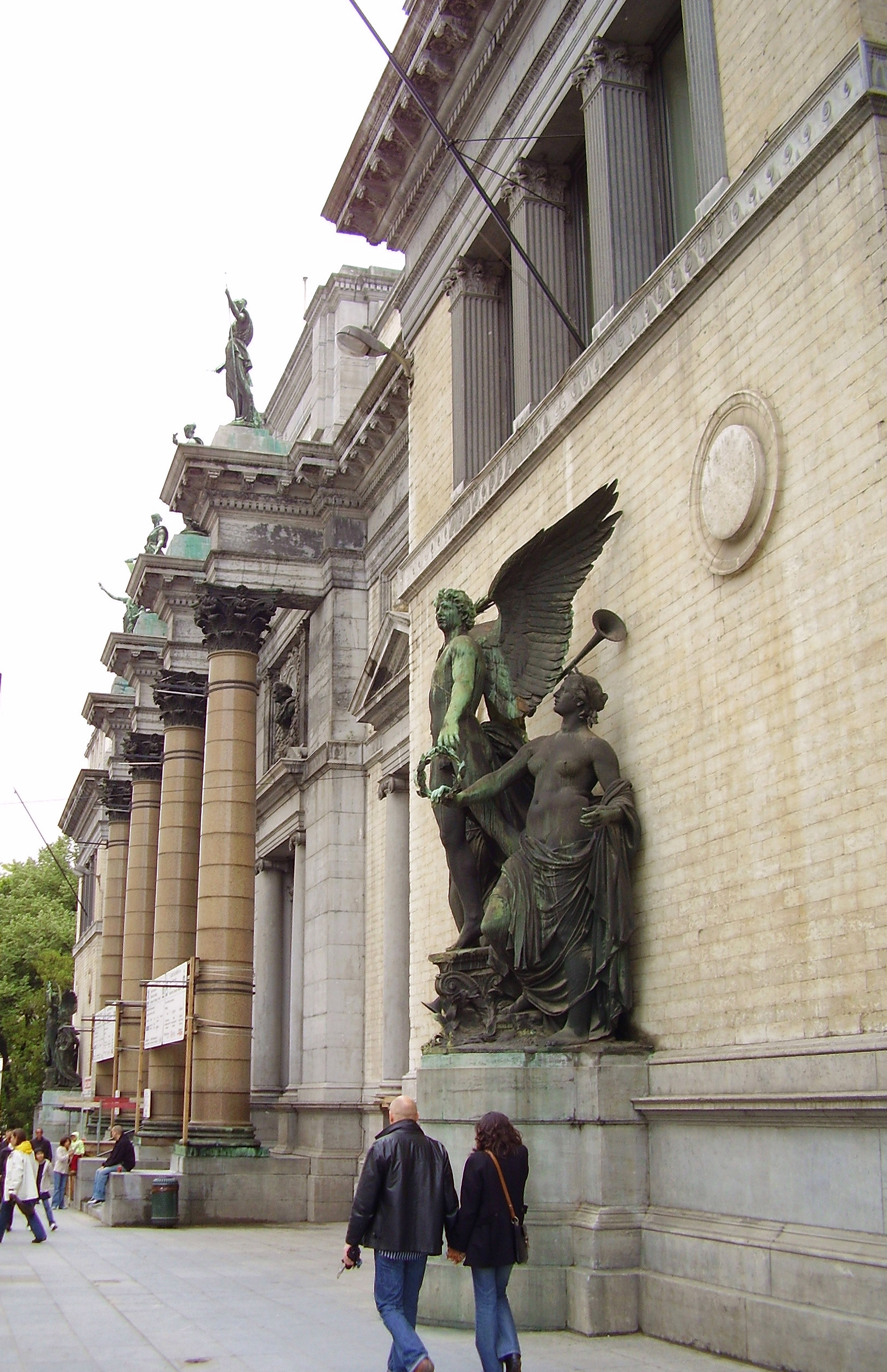
- The Oldmasters Museum's entrance on the Rue de la Régence/Regentschapsstraat
- Interactive fullscreen map
- Former name: Royal Museum of Ancient Art
- Location: Rue de la Régence / Regentschapsstraat 3, 1000 City of Brussels, Brussels-Capital Region, Belgium
- Coordinates: 50°50′31″N 4°21′28″E
- Type: Art museum
- Public transit access: Brussels-Central; 1 5 Parc/Park and 2 6 Trône/Troon
- Website: www.fine-arts-museum.be/en/museums/musee-oldmasters-museum

The Oldmasters Museum (French: Musée Oldmasters; Dutch: Oldmasters Museum) is an art museum in the Royal Quarter of Brussels, Belgium, dedicated to Old Master European painters of the 15th to the 18th centuries, with some later works. It is one of the constituent museums of the Royal Museums of Fine Arts of Belgium.

The museum has a large and internationally important collection of Netherlandish art, mostly from the Southern Netherlands that mostly equate to modern Belgium. There are panels by the Flemish Primitives including Robert Campin, Rogier van der Weyden, Hieronymus Bosch, Pieter Bruegel the Elder, Anthony van Dyck, and Jacob Jordaens. The collection also includes paintings and sculptures from other parts of Europe.

The museum was founded in 1801 by Napoleon. It was formerly called the Royal Museum of Ancient Art (French: Musée royal d'Art ancien; Dutch: Koninklijk Museum voor Oude Kunst). (Note: This English name, used by the institution, is a literal translation of the French. However, none of the collection would be classified as 'ancient' in the English meaning of the word.) It is housed in the main building of the Royal Museums of Fine Arts (Palace of Fine Arts) located at 3, rue de la Régence/Regentschapsstraat.

== Naming ==
The museum is commonly referred to as the Oldmasters Museum in Dutch and English, and Musée Oldmasters in French, officially expressed in the Belgian bilingual style as Musée Oldmasters Museum. The title uses the compound term Oldmasters without a space, reflecting the branding adopted by the Royal Museums of Fine Arts of Belgium in the early 21st century for several of its constituent museums. Traditionally, the collection had been referred to in French as the Musée d'Art ancien ("Museum of Ancient Art") and in Dutch as the Museum voor Oude Kunst ("Museum of Old Art").

The term Old Masters (French: vieux maîtres, Dutch: oude meesters) generally refers to European painters active before the end of the 18th century, particularly from the Renaissance, Baroque, and Rococo periods. The museum's name highlights the historical core of its collection, which includes works by early Netherlandish and Flemish painters such as Pieter Bruegel the Elder, Peter Paul Rubens, and Anthony van Dyck.

== History ==
=== Early history ===
The museum is part of the Royal Museums of Fine Arts of Belgium (French: Musées Royaux des Beaux-Arts de Belgique, Dutch: Koninklijke Musea voor Schone Kunsten van België), a management body controlling several museums in Brussels, to which all reproduction rights belong, so that that name appears in publishing credits. The institution was founded on 1 September 1801 by Napoleon and opened in 1803 as the Museum of Fine Arts of Brussels (French: Musée des Beaux-Arts de Bruxelles, Dutch: Museum voor Schone Kunsten van Brussel), occupying fourteen rooms of the former Palace of Charles of Lorraine, known as the "Old Court".

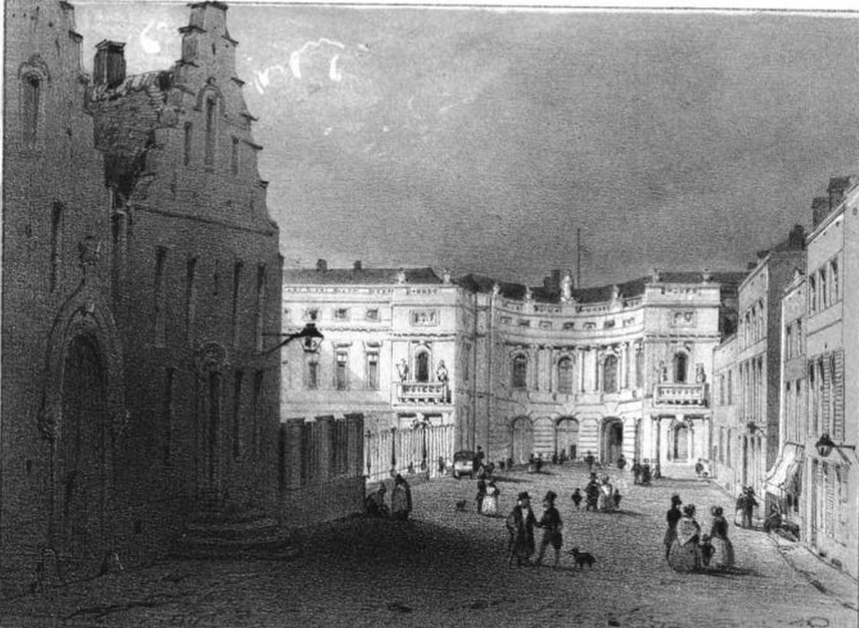
The Palace of Charles of Lorraine, the museum's first location, in 1846

The first collection, the core of the current collections of Ancient Art, consisted of a selection of "old deposits", works of art seized by the French Republic but abandoned (1798), increased by two shipments from Paris (1802 and 1811), and returned works taken away by the Republic (1815). Later, during the Dutch period, King William I of the Netherlands sponsored an expansion of the collection (1817 and 1819) and had two wings built on the current Place du Musée/Museumplein (the Palace of National Industry, opened in 1830). Bought by the Belgian state from the City of Brussels, these collections form the embryo of Belgian artistic and literary heritage that will gradually be concentrated in the area.

The works of the Old Masters were finally moved from the Palace of Charles of Lorraine to the Rue de la Régence/Regentschapsstraat in 1887, giving a new purpose to Alphonse Balat's Palace of Fine Arts, which had opened in 1880 (not to be confused with the current Centre for Fine Arts). On that occasion, the museum was renamed to the Royal Museum of Ancient Art (French: Musée royal d'Art ancien, Dutch: Koninklijk Museum voor Oude Kunst).

=== 20th and 21st centuries ===
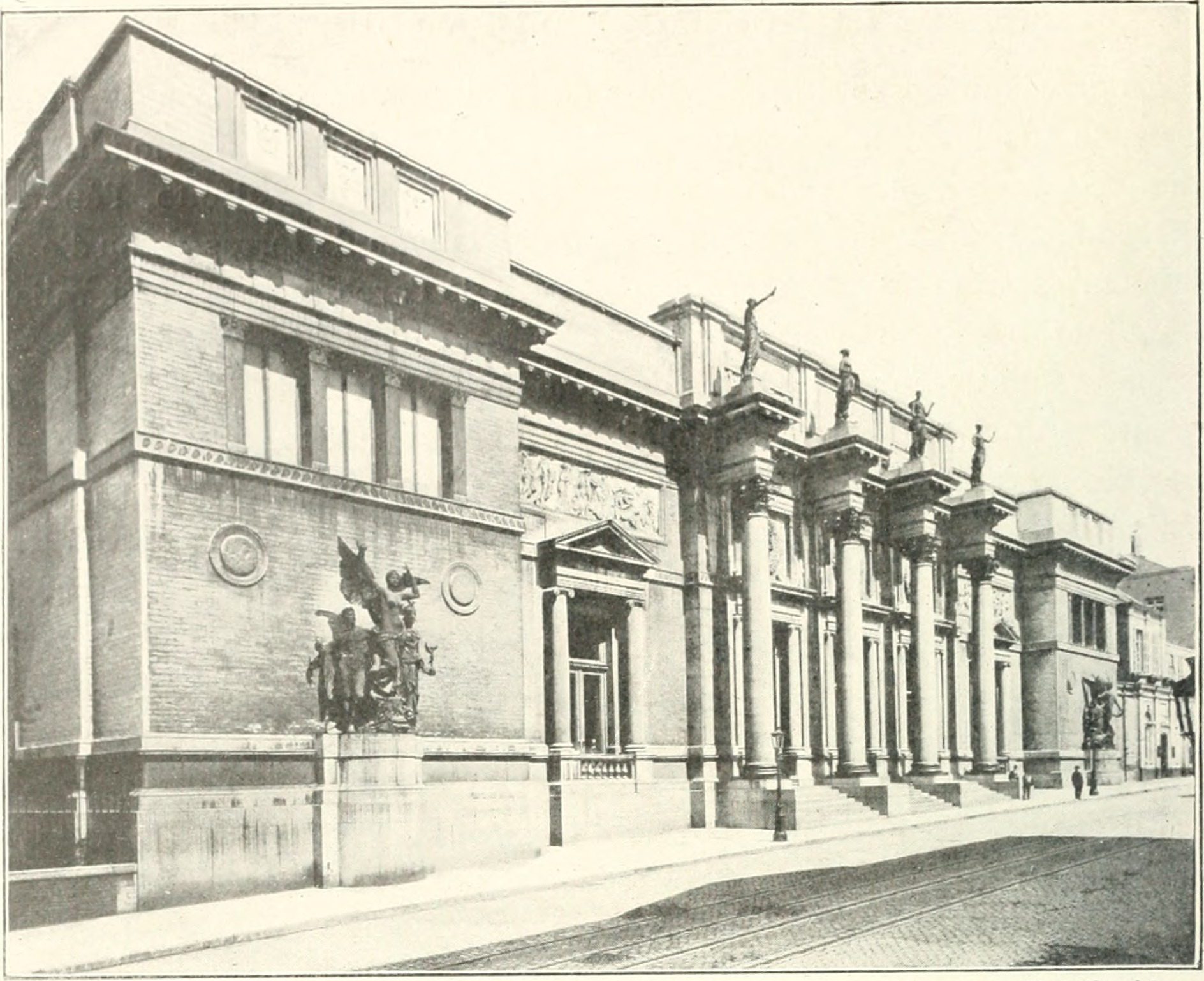
The Palace of Fine Arts, the museum's second (current) location, in 1910

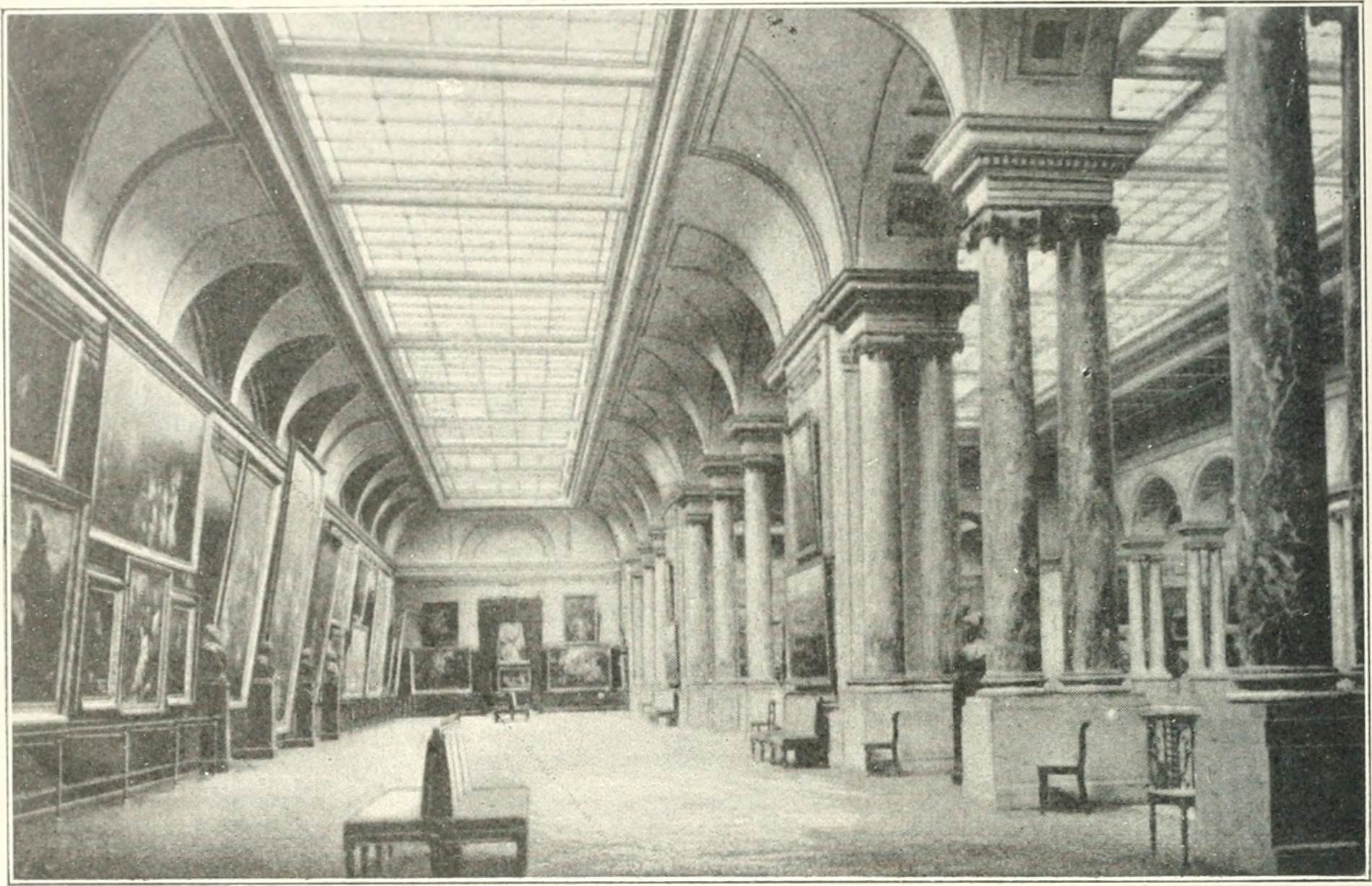
Interior of the Palace of Fine Arts in 1910

The museum continued to expand in subsequent years, benefitting from increases through purchases, donations or bequests. In 1914, the De Grez donation enriched the collection with more than 4,000 drawings dating from the 16th to the 19th centuries, notably by Hendrick Goltzius, Jacob de Gheyn II, and Rembrandt, to name a few. Other important acquisitions included the Delia Faille de Leverghem (1942) donation, as well as the Delporte-Livrauw (1973) and Goldschmidt (1990) bequests.

The museum's redevelopment by the architect Albert Van Huffel from 1923 to 1930 allowed a new presentation of the collections. The extension of the Museum of Ancient Art combined with that of the National Archives of Belgium, behind the façades of the former Palace of National Industry, allowed the creation of a new set of rooms and an auditorium. Planned in 1962 by the architects Roland Delers and Jacques Bellemans, it was inaugurated in phases in 1972 and 1974. Towards the Place Royale, the Hôtel Argenteau, the Hôtel Gresham and the Hôtel Altenloh were incorporated in turn in 1965, 1967 and 1969 respectively. An renovation of Balat's palace was carried out in successive stages from 1977. The complex was inaugurated in 1984.

By the 2020s, the museum had been renamed again to the Oldmasters Museum. The appropriation and inventive reshaping of the English two-word term "Old Masters" was thought to work well in a Belgian context, and for anglophone tourists, as the museum's collection is rich in the Netherlandish paintings from before 1800 for which the term was coined.

== Collection ==
The Oldmasters Museum has an extensive collection of European paintings, sculptures and drawings from the 15th to the 18th centuries. The bulk of the collection is formed around Flemish painting from the 15th to the 17th centuries and is presented in chronological order. The museum houses a small but comprehensive collection of early Netherlandish paintings with works by masters such as Robert Campin (the Master of Flémalle), Rogier van der Weyden, Petrus Christus, Hugo van der Goes, Dirk Bouts, Hans Memling and Hieronymus Bosch. The Italian and French schools are also represented, notably by Carlo Crivelli, and the Master of the Annunciation of Aix-en-Provence (possibly Barthélemy d'Eyck).

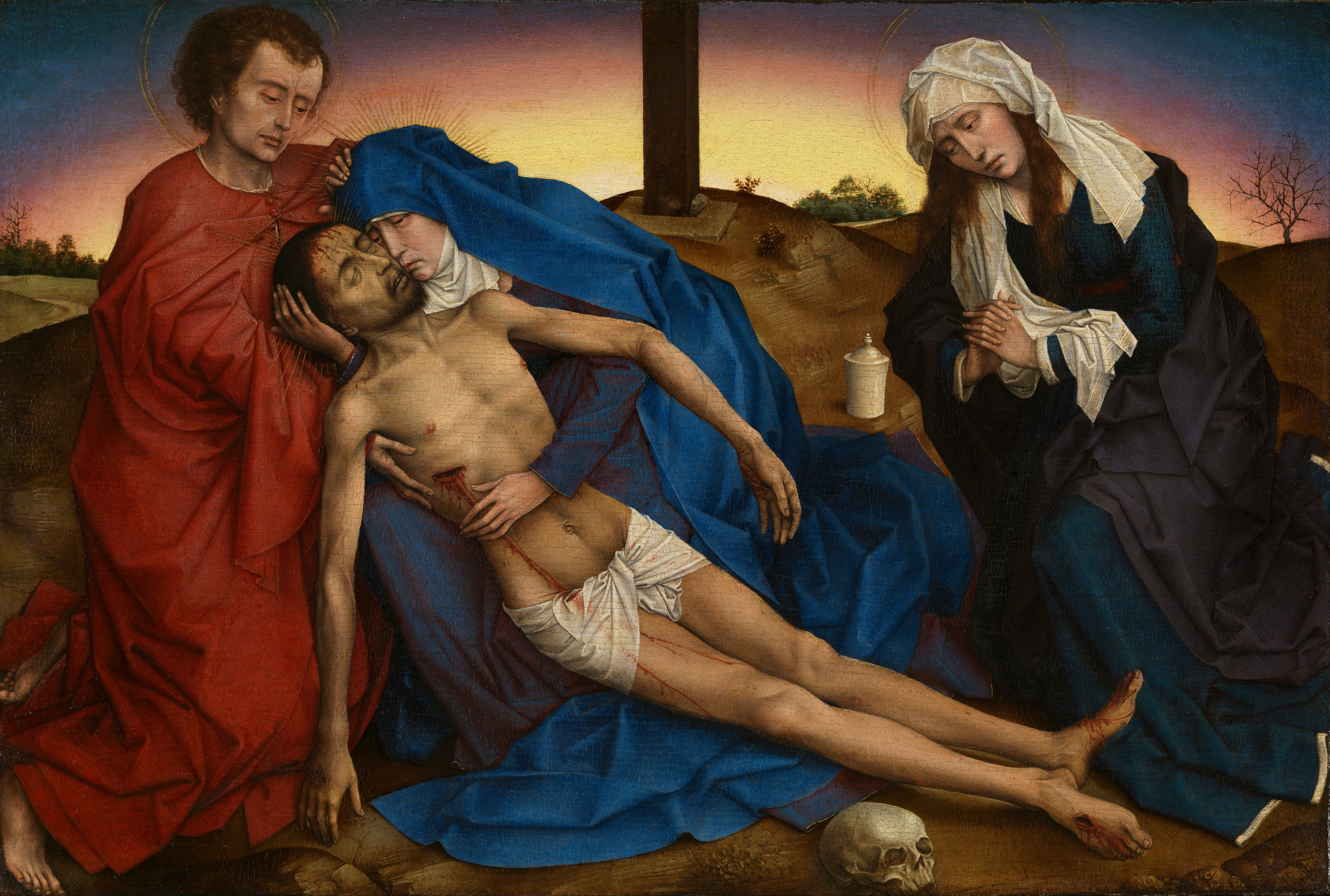
Lamentation of Christ, Rogier van der Weyden, c. 1455

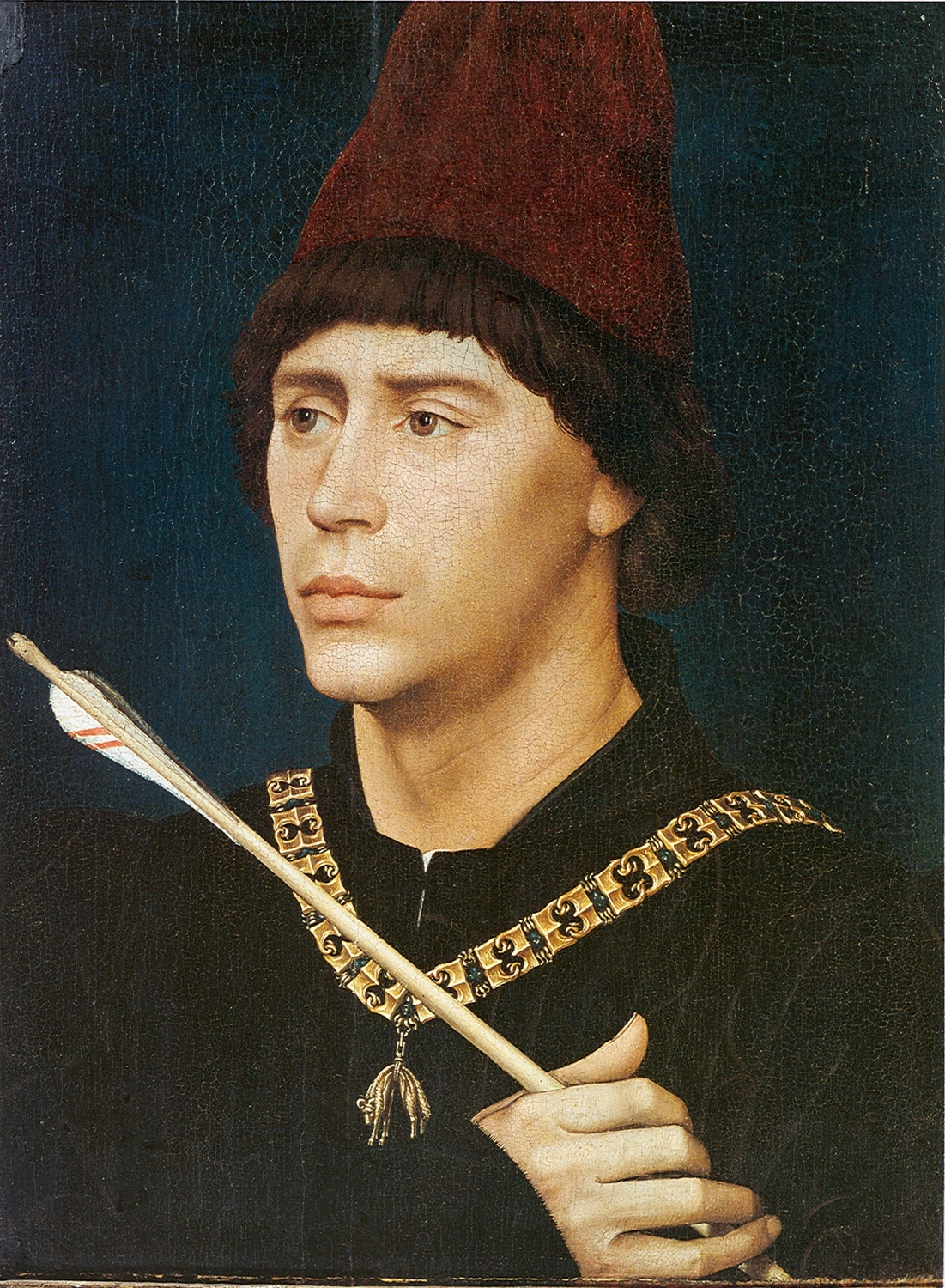
Portrait of Antoine, 'Grand Bâtard' of Burgundy, Van der Weyden, c. 1460

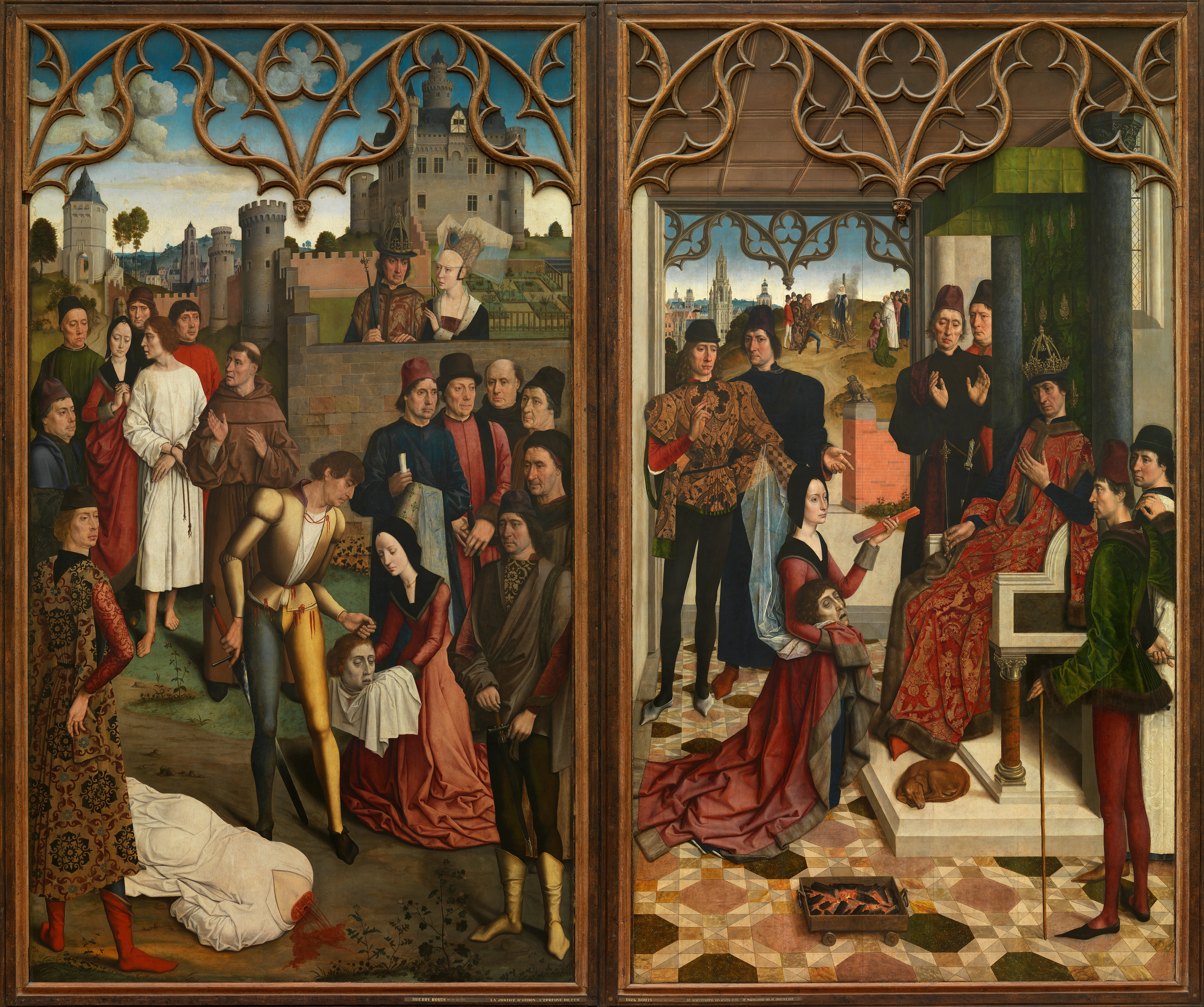
Justice of Emperor Otto III, Dirk Bouts, c. 1473–1475

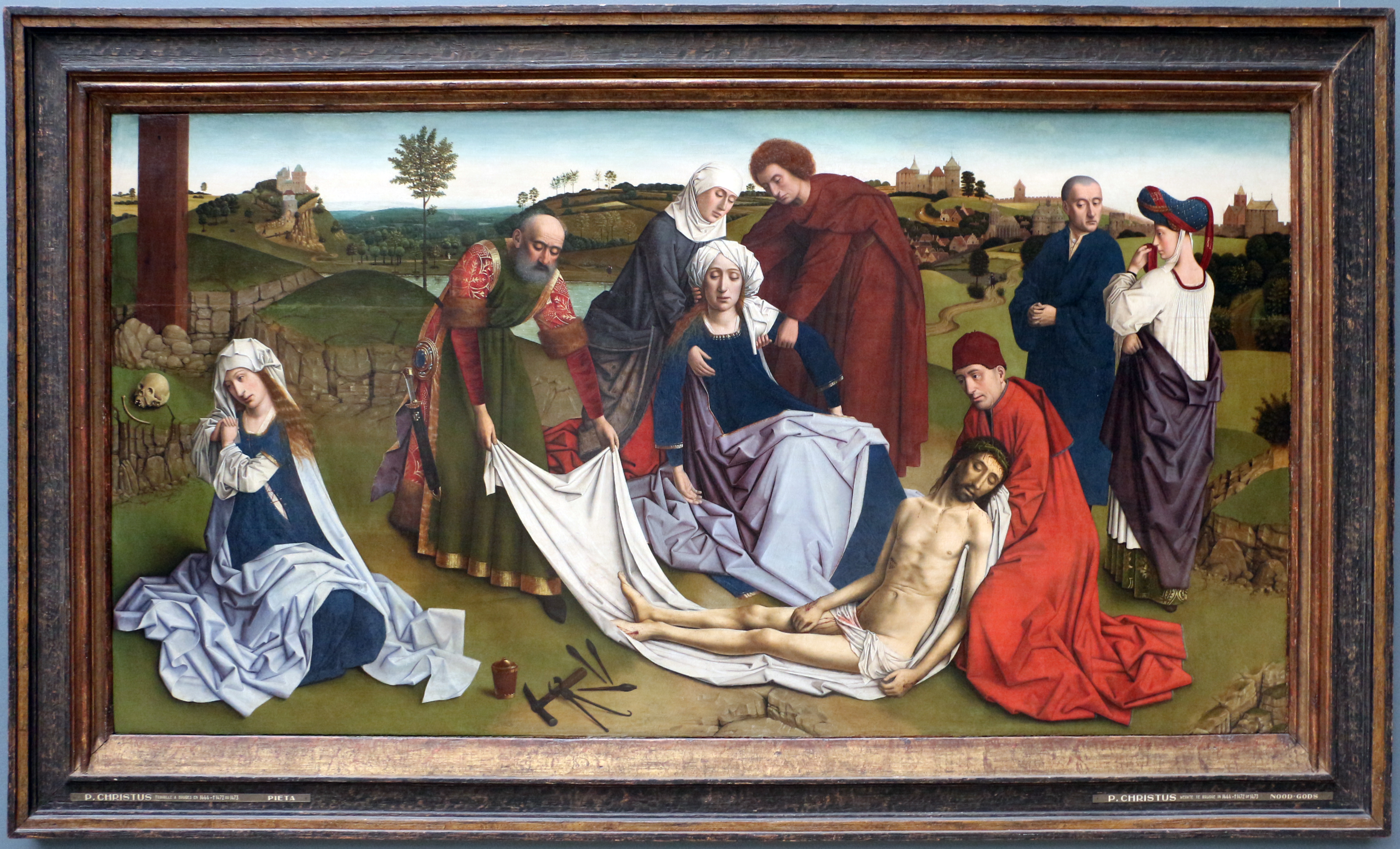
Lamentation of Christ, Petrus Christus, c. 1455

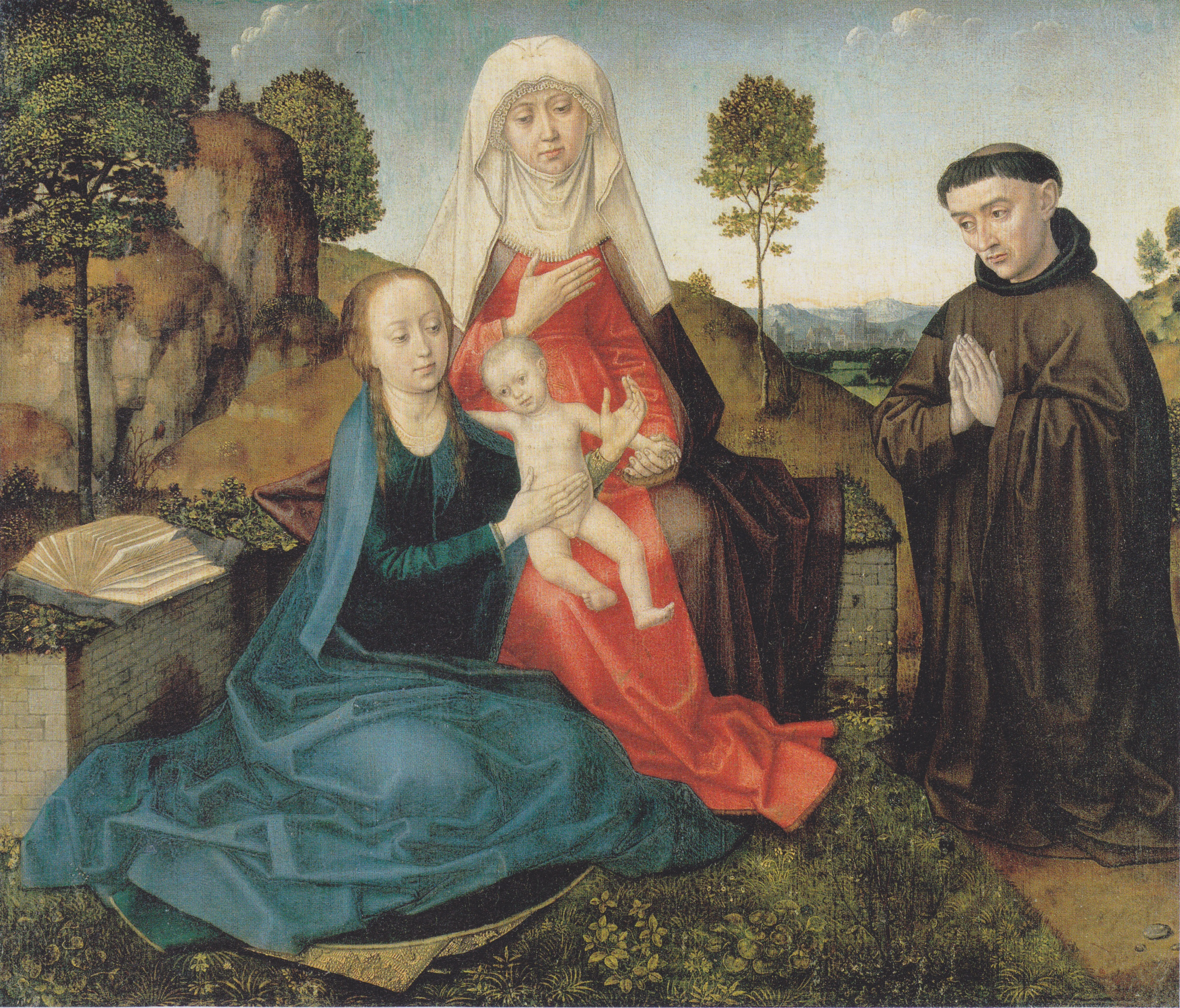
The Virgin and Child with a Franciscan Founder, Hugo van der Goes, c. 1475

Crucifixion with a Donor, Hieronymus Bosch, c. 1480–1485

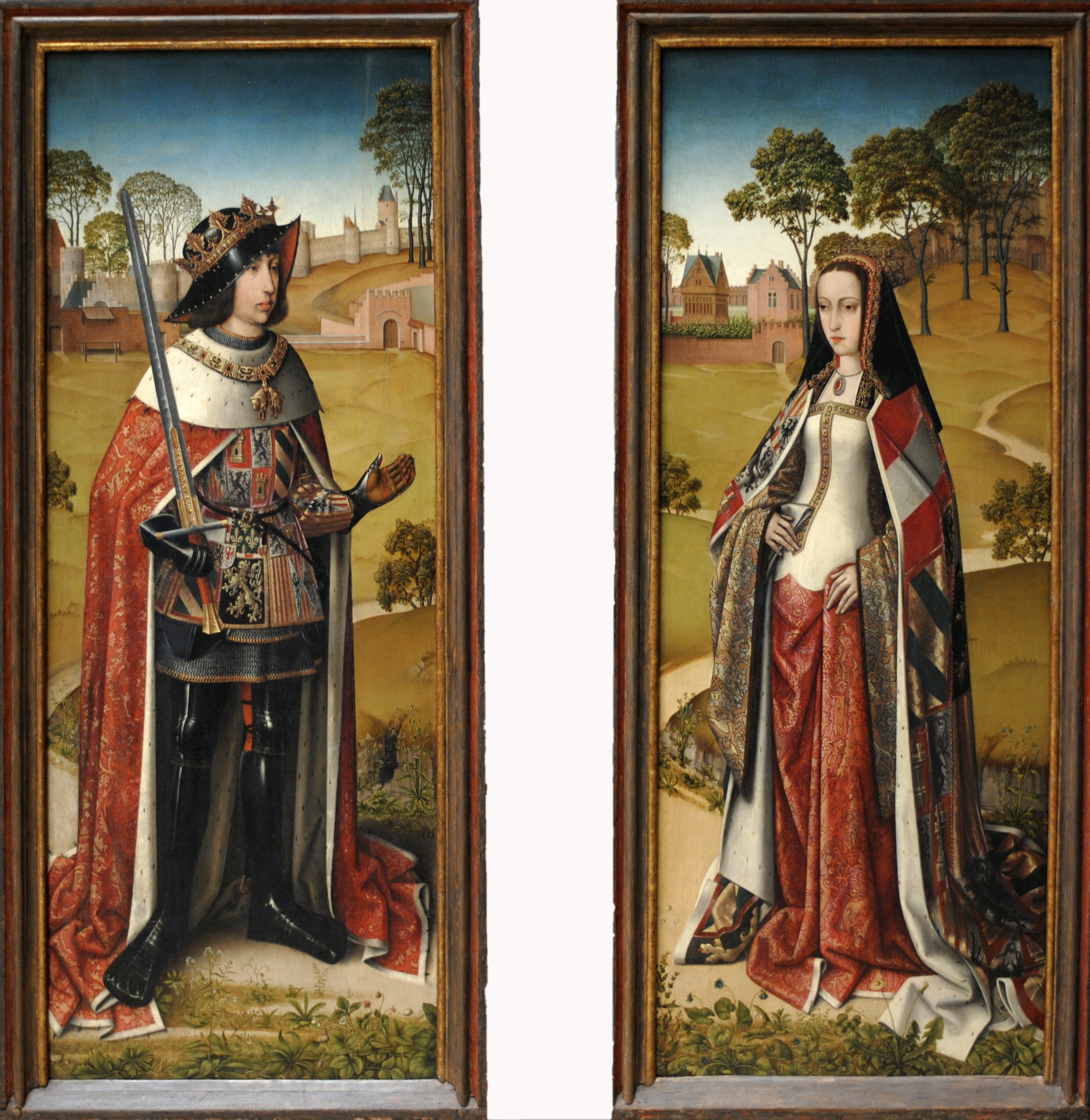
Philip the Fair and Joan the Mad in the gardens of the Palace of Coudenberg, Master of Affligem, 1495–1506

The 16th-century rooms include works by artists from Bruges and Antwerp at the beginning of the century: Gerard David, Quentin Matsys, and Joos van Cleve, before moving on to the Antwerp Mannerists and Romanists: Jan Gossaert known as Mabuse, and Bernard van Orley. Important artists in the development of landscape and genre painting are also featured, including Joachim Patinir, Henri Bles, Jan van Hemessen, Pieter Aertsen, and Joachim Bueckelaer.

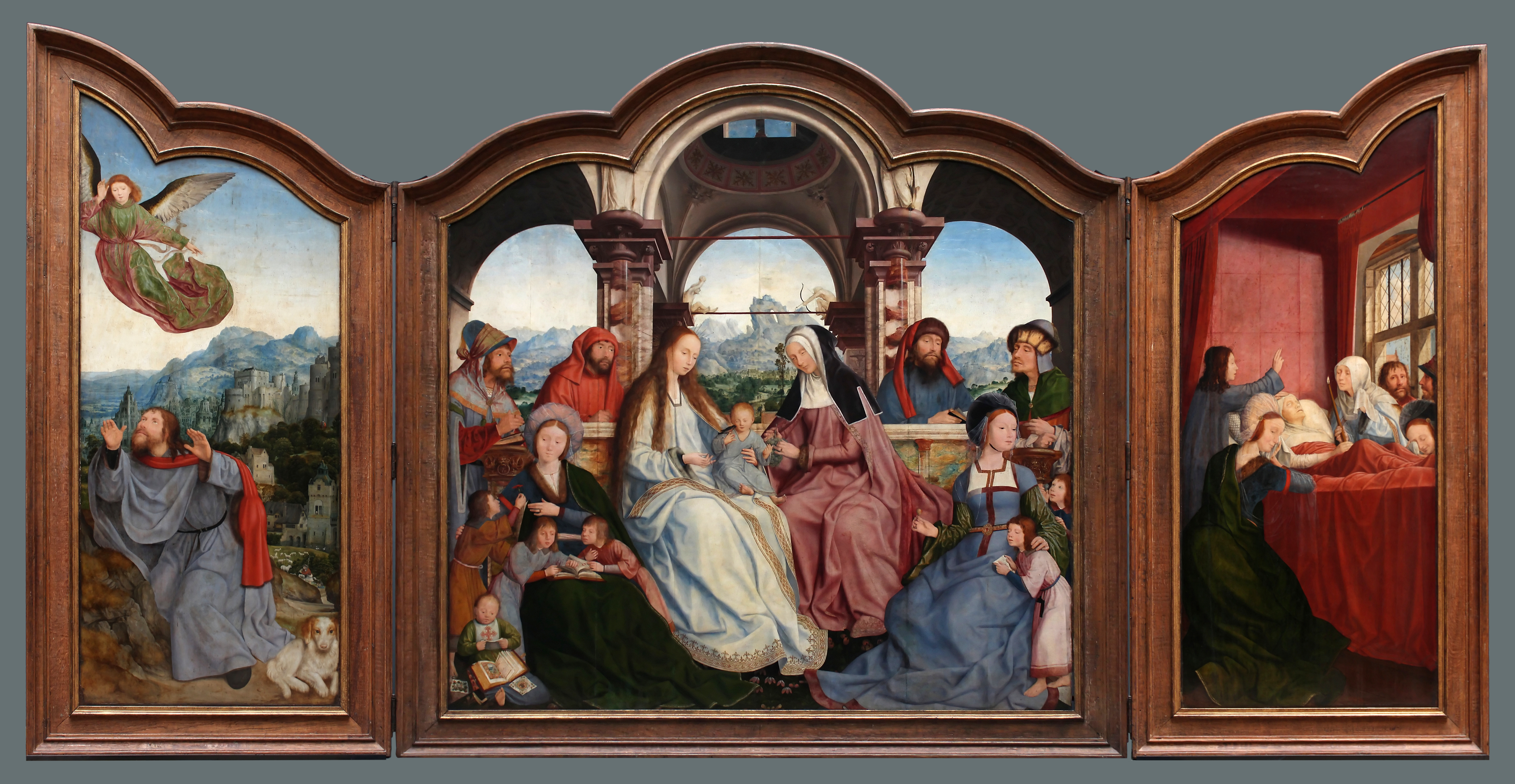
Saint-Anne Triptych, Quentin Matsys, 1509

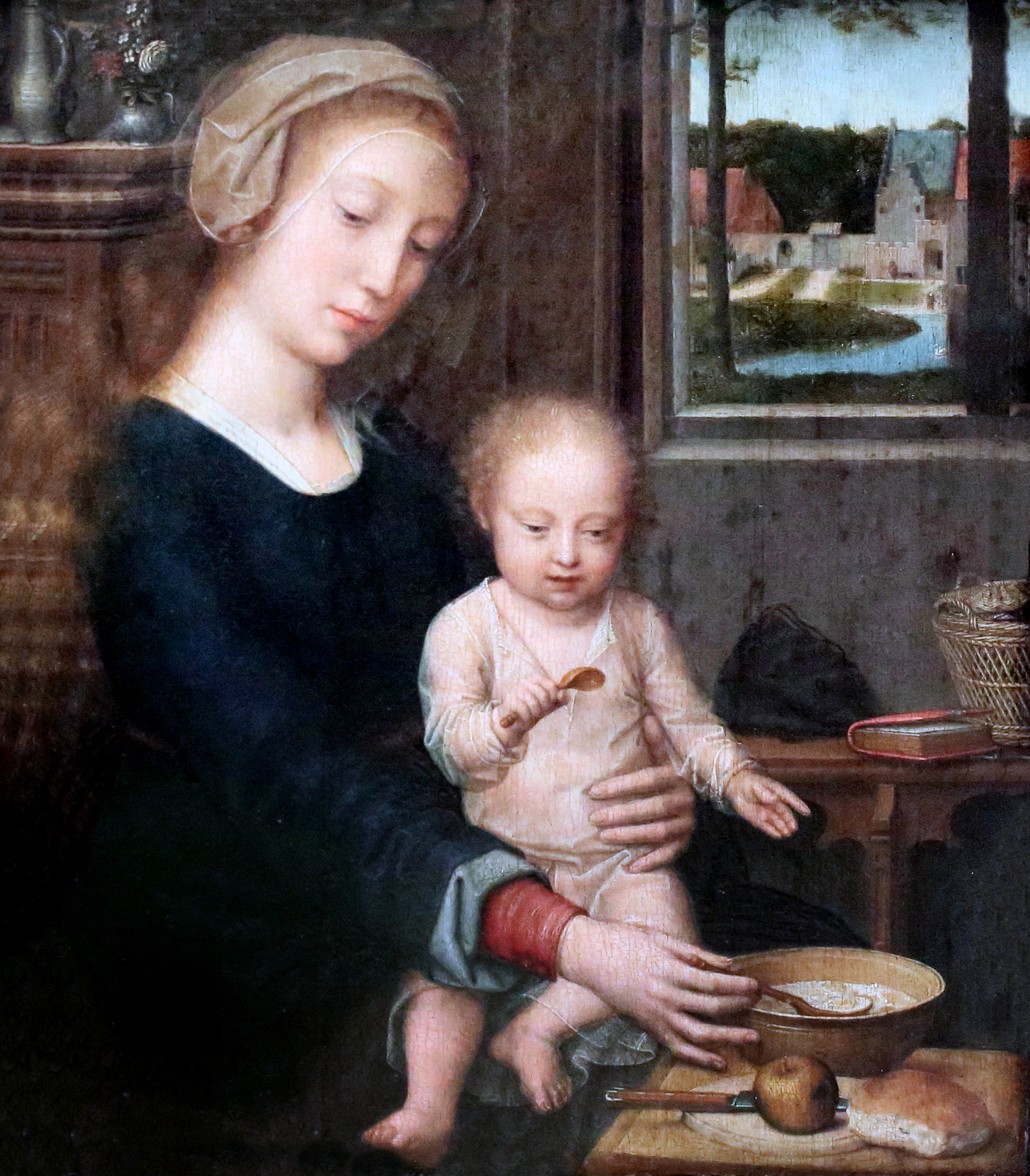
Madonna and Child with the Milk Soup, Gerard David, c. 1515

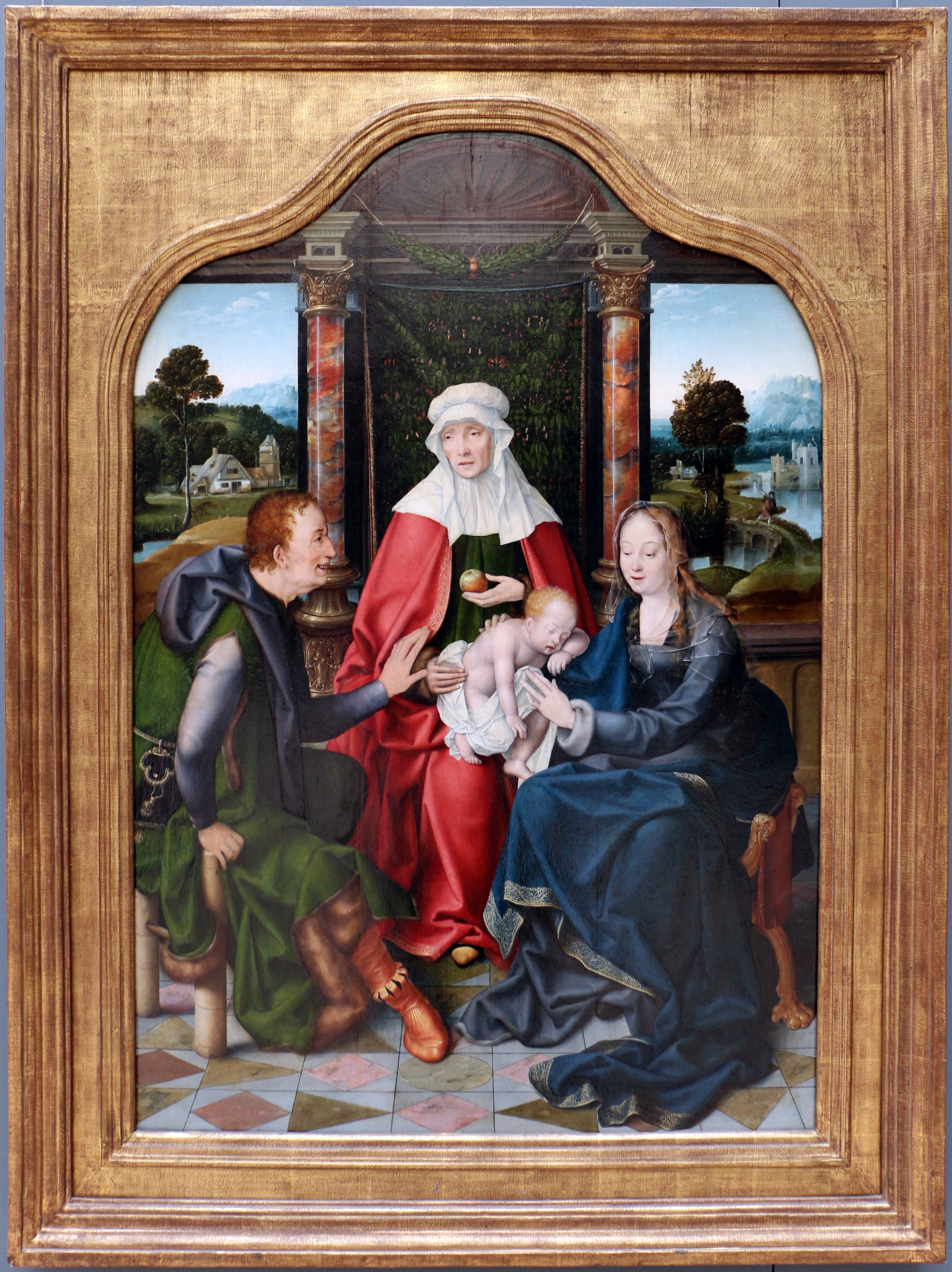
St Anne with the Virgin and Child and St Joachim, Joos van Cleve, c. 1520

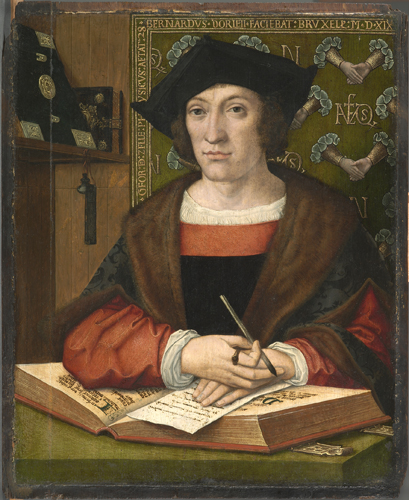
Portrait of Joris van Zelle, Bernard van Orley, 1519

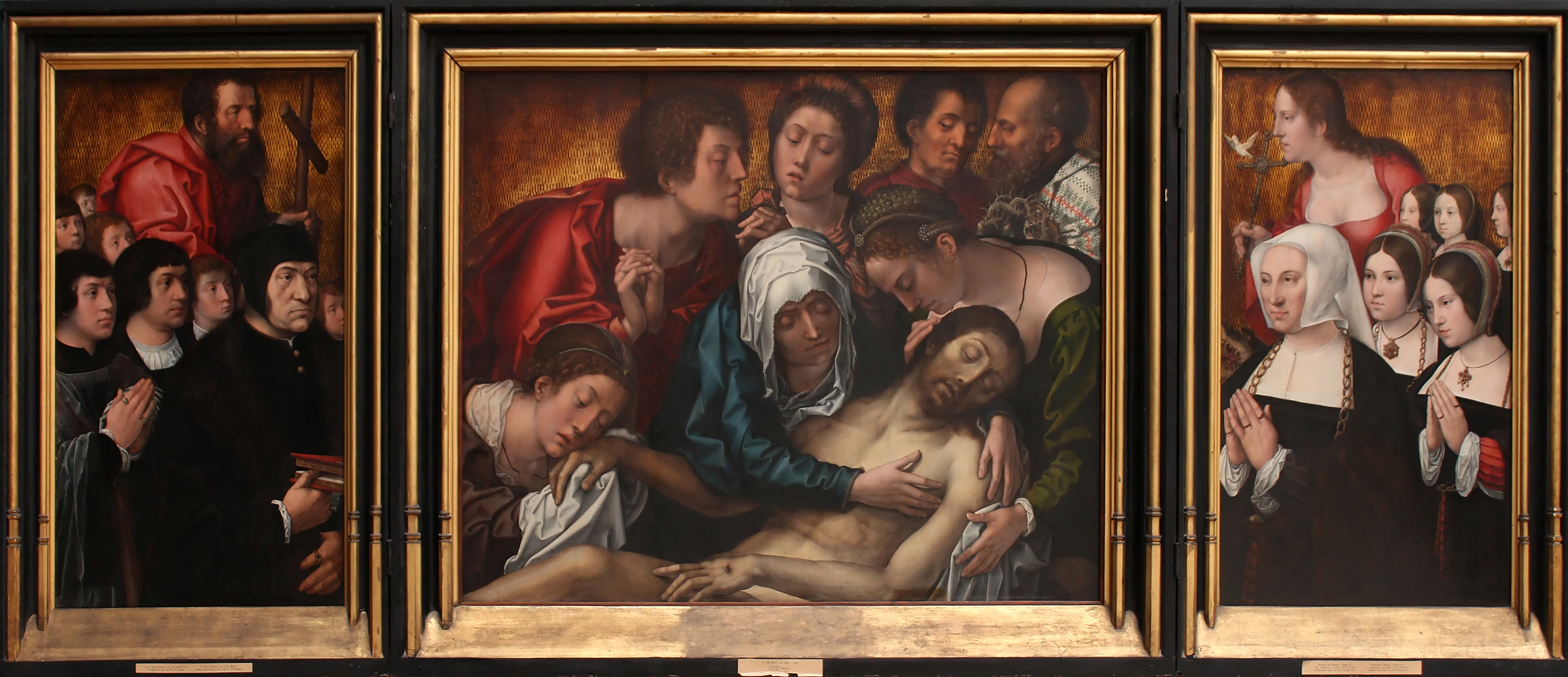
Haneton Triptych, Van Orley, 1521–22

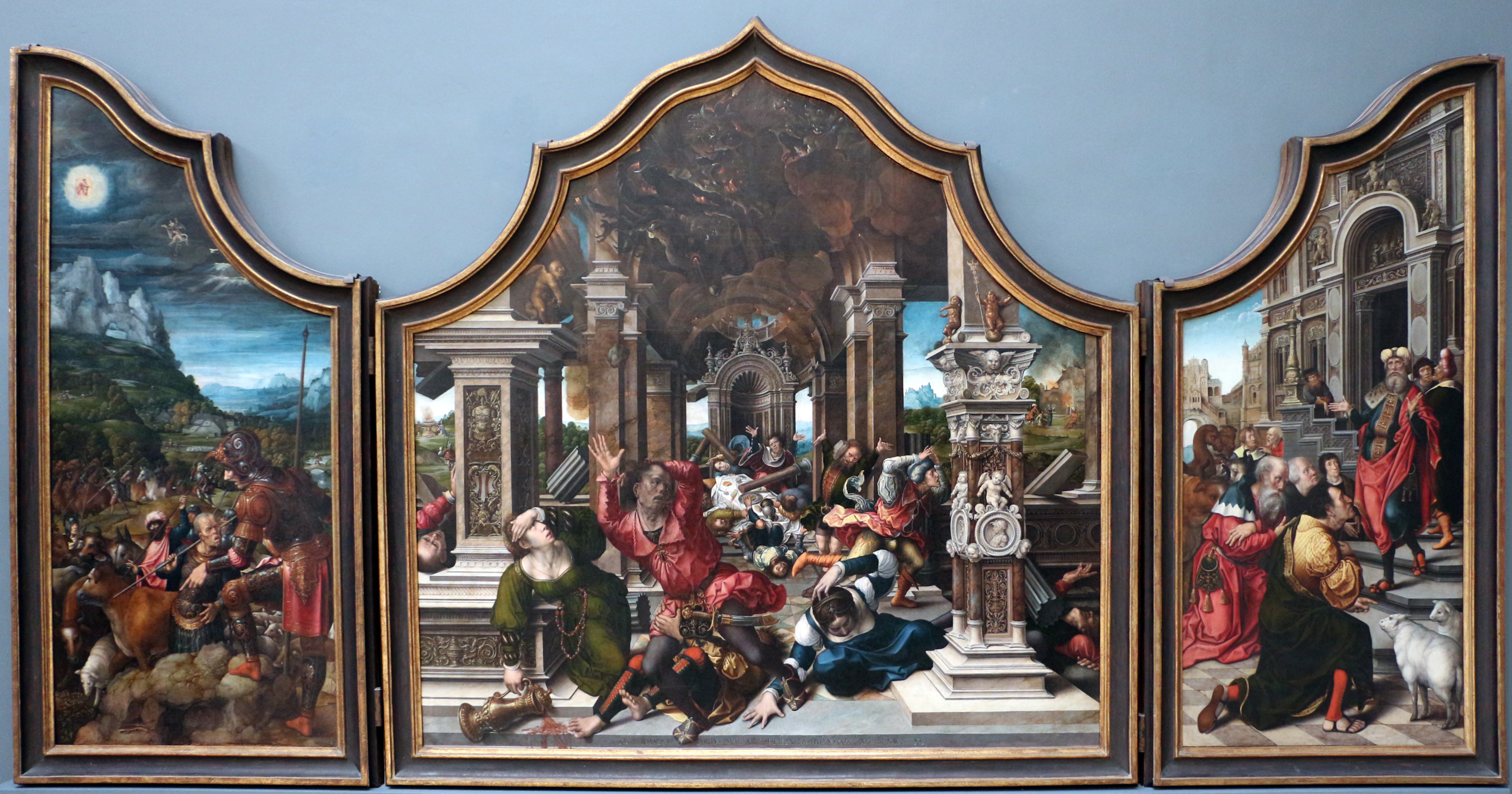
Triptych of the Virtue of Patience, Van Orley, 1521

Landscape with Saint John the Baptist Preaching, Joachim Patinir, c. 1515

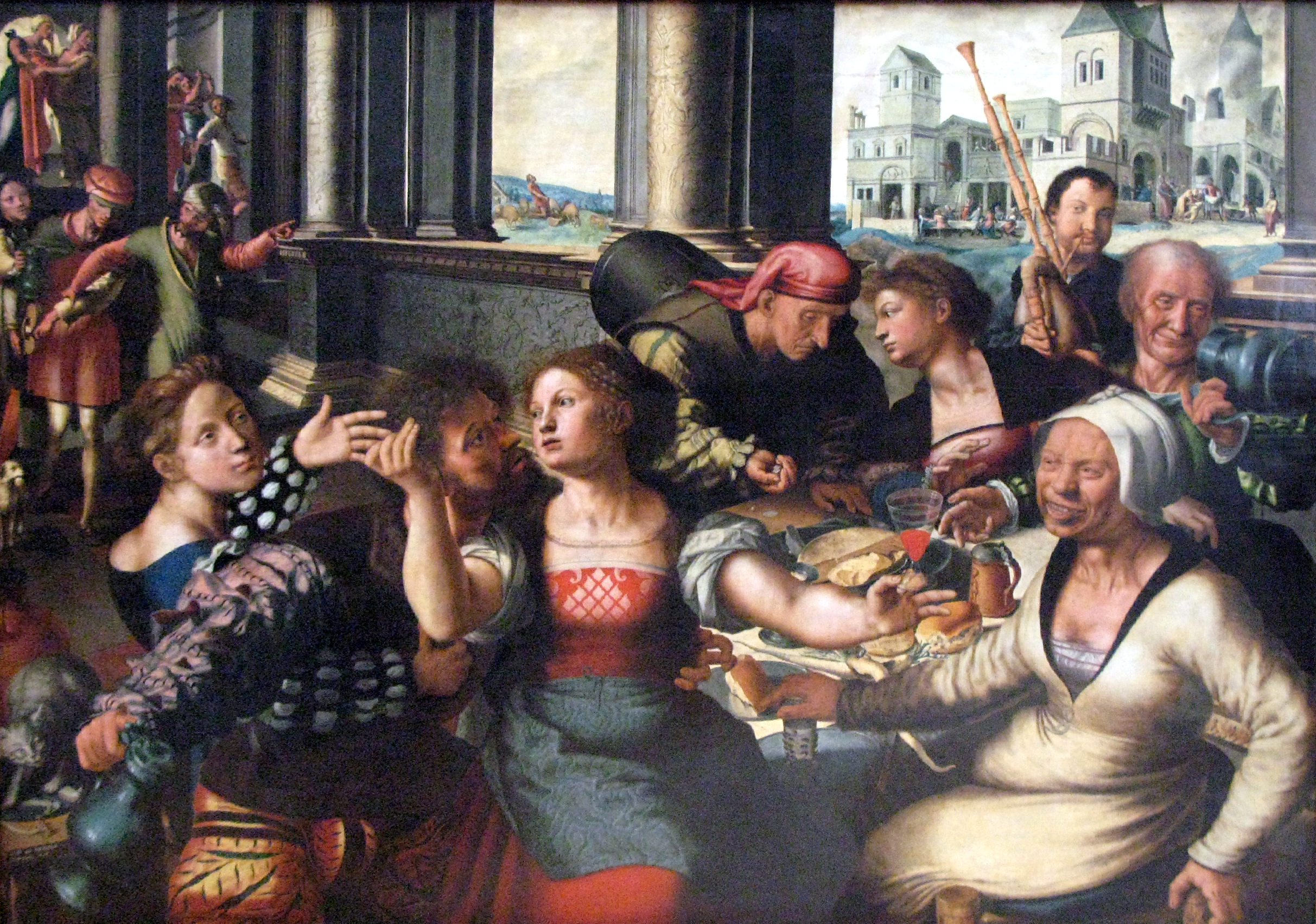
The Prodigal Son in a Brothel, Jan van Hemessen, 1537

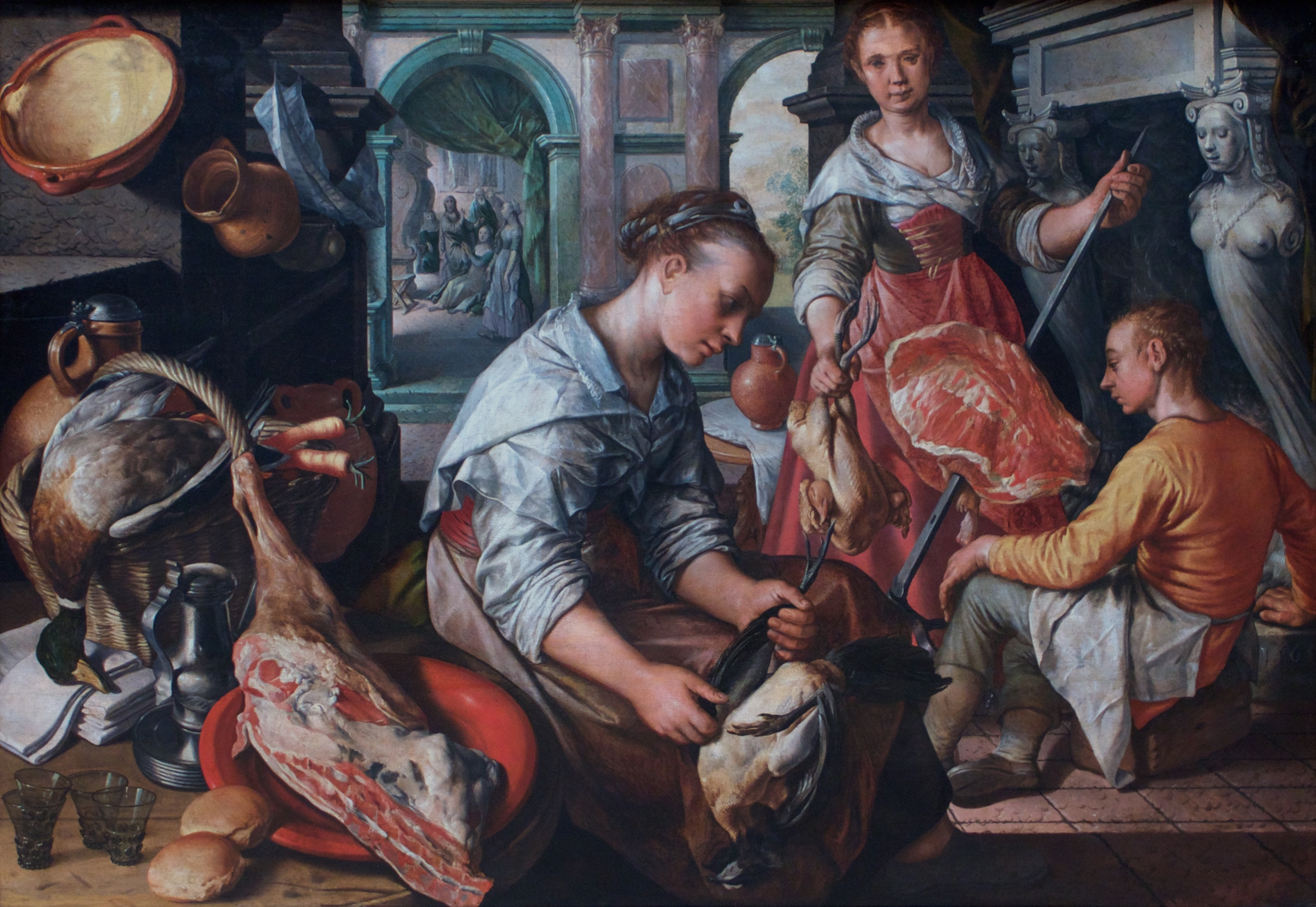
Christ in the House of Martha and Mary, Joachim Beuckelaer, 1537

The museum houses the world's second-largest collection of paintings by Pieter Bruegel the Elder (after Vienna) with masterpieces such as The Census at Bethlehem, The Fall of the Rebel Angels, Winter Landscape with a Bird Trap, and an early glue-size on cloth painting depicting The Adoration of the Kings.

The Landscape with the Fall of Icarus is a public favourite, whose attribution to Pieter Bruegel the Elder is however doubted by experts today. For English-speakers, it is one of the museum's most famous works, if only because of W. H. Auden's poem Musée des Beaux Arts. Numerous copies attributed to Bruegel's son and follower Pieter Bruegel the Younger are part of the collection as well, as are works of Jan Bruegel the Elder and other representatives of the Bruegel dynasty.

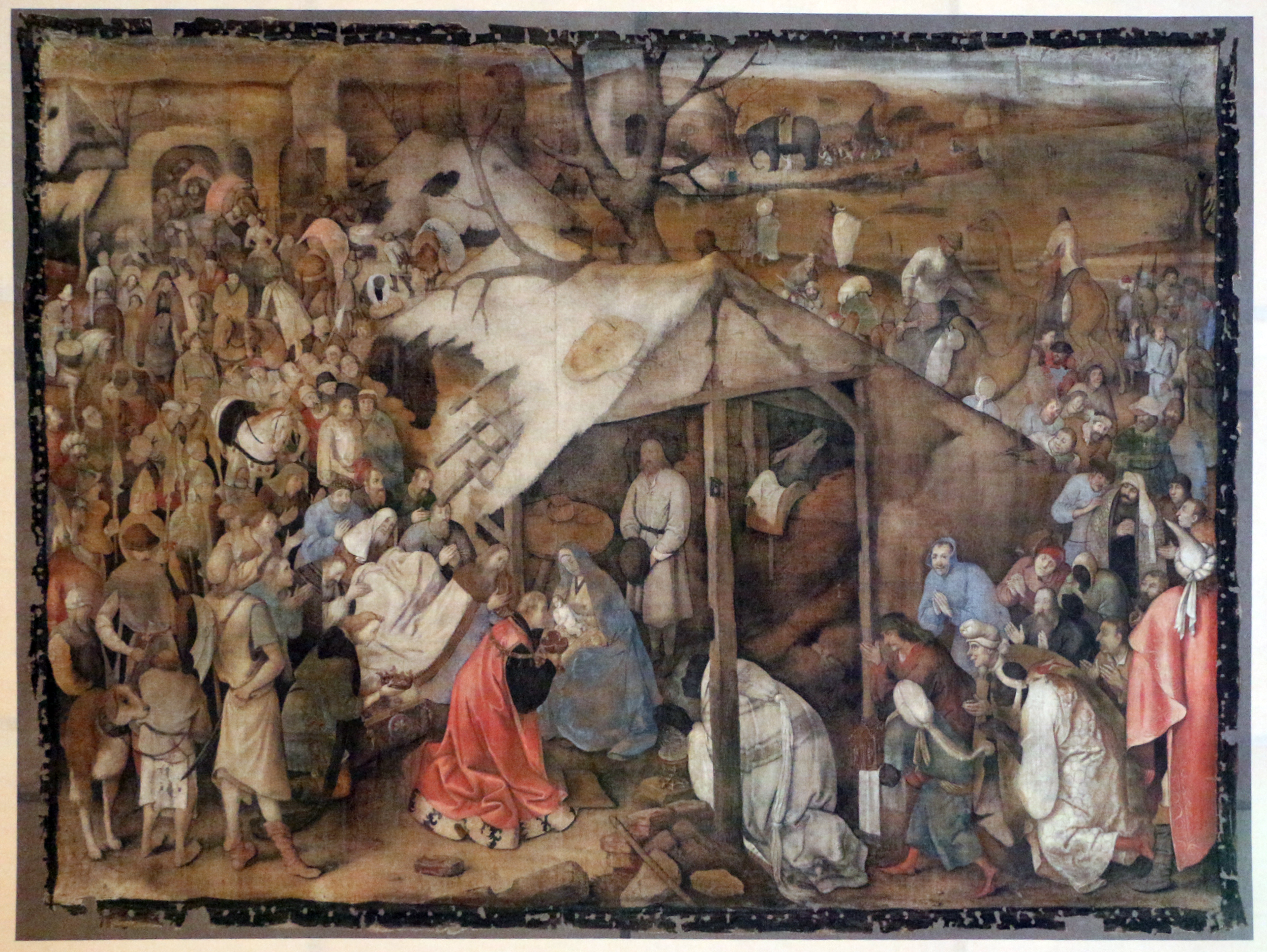
Adoration of the Kings, Pieter Bruegel the Elder, c. 1556

The Fall of the Rebel Angels, Bruegel, 1562

Winter Landscape with a Bird Trap, Bruegel, c. 1565

The Census at Bethlehem, Bruegel, 1566

Landscape with the Fall of Icarus, by or after Bruegel, c. 1560

The museum has a collection of works from 17th-century Flemish artists. Peter Paul Rubens and his workshop are represented in more than twenty works, including oil sketches by Rubens that were preparatory works or modelli for larger commissions, often executed with the help of workshop assistants. Several are altarpieces from former churches and monasteries in Brussels and the surrounding area.

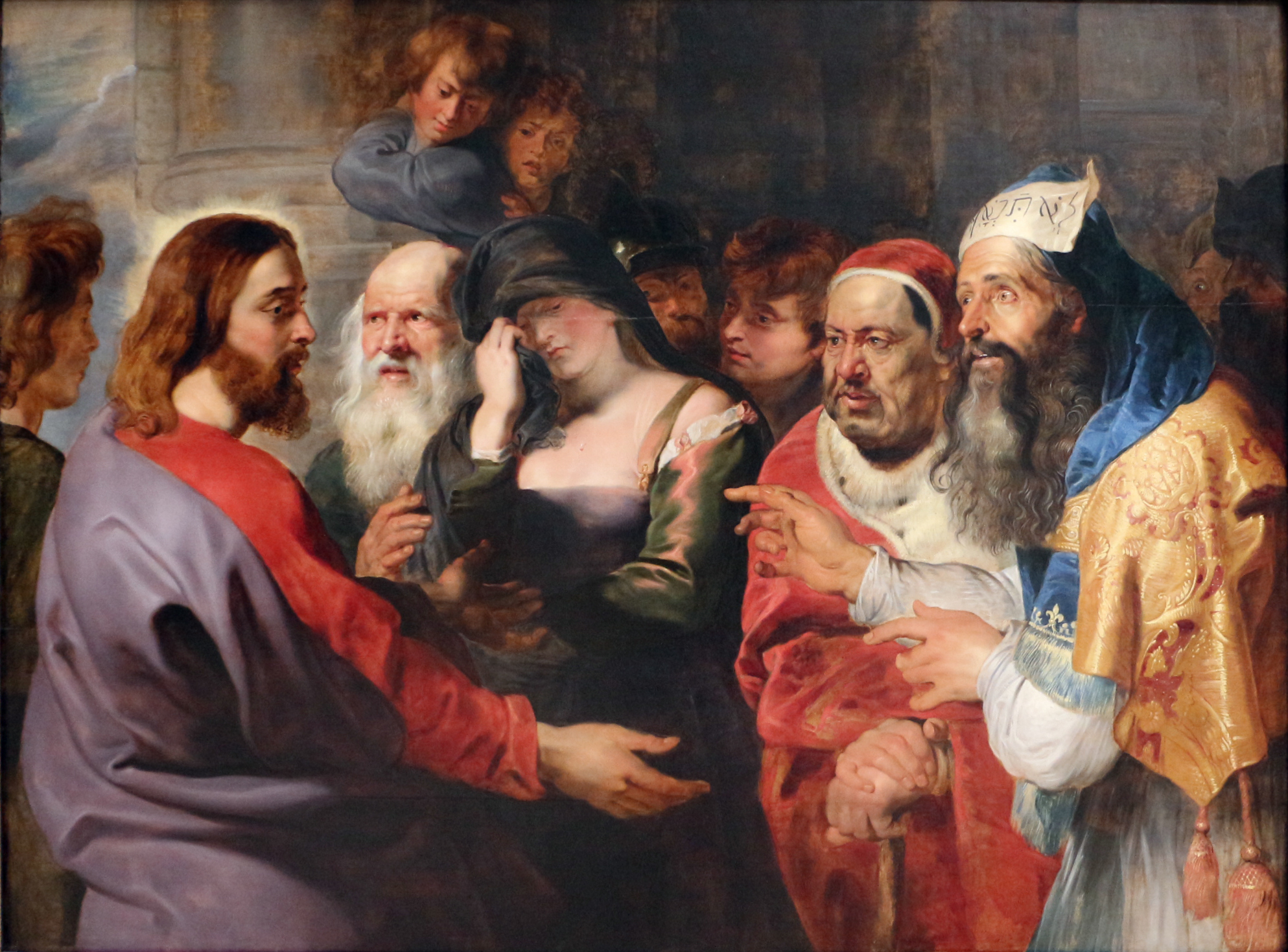
Jesus Christ and the woman taken in adultery, Peter Paul Rubens, 1614

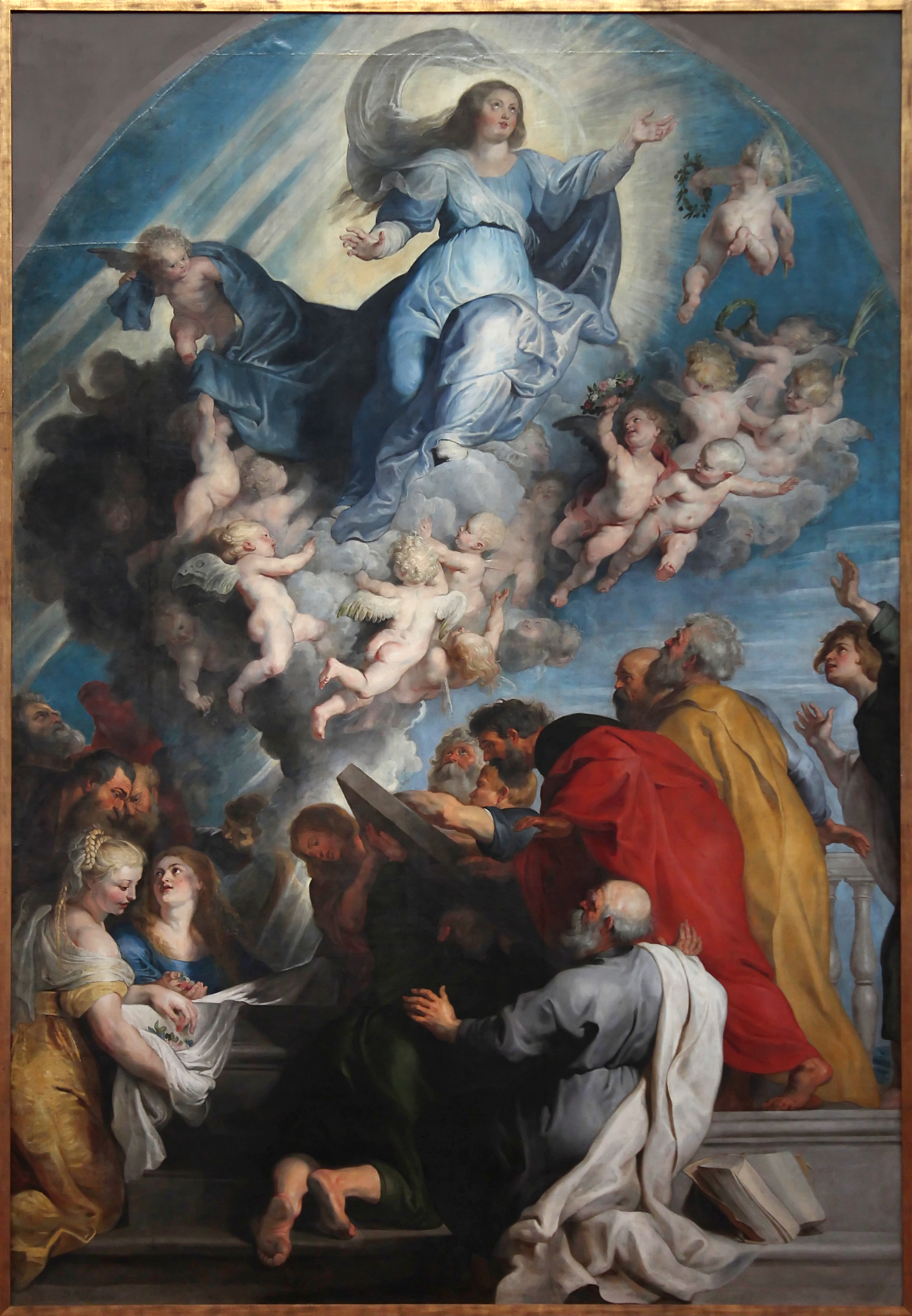
Assumption of the Virgin Mary, Rubens and workshop, from the church of the Discalced Carmelites in Brussels, c. 1616

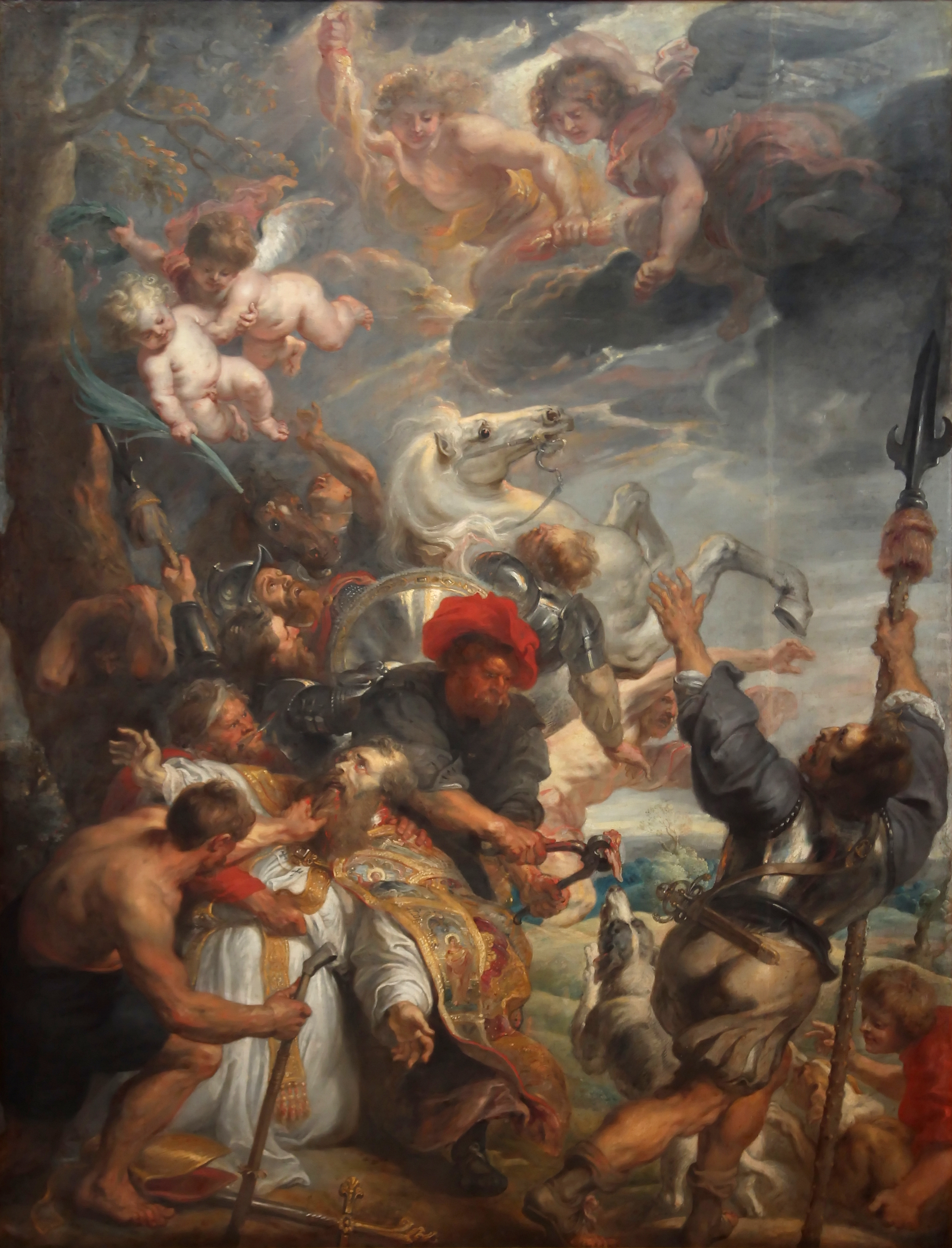
The Martyrdom of Saint Lievin, Rubens, from the Jesuit church in Ghent, 1633

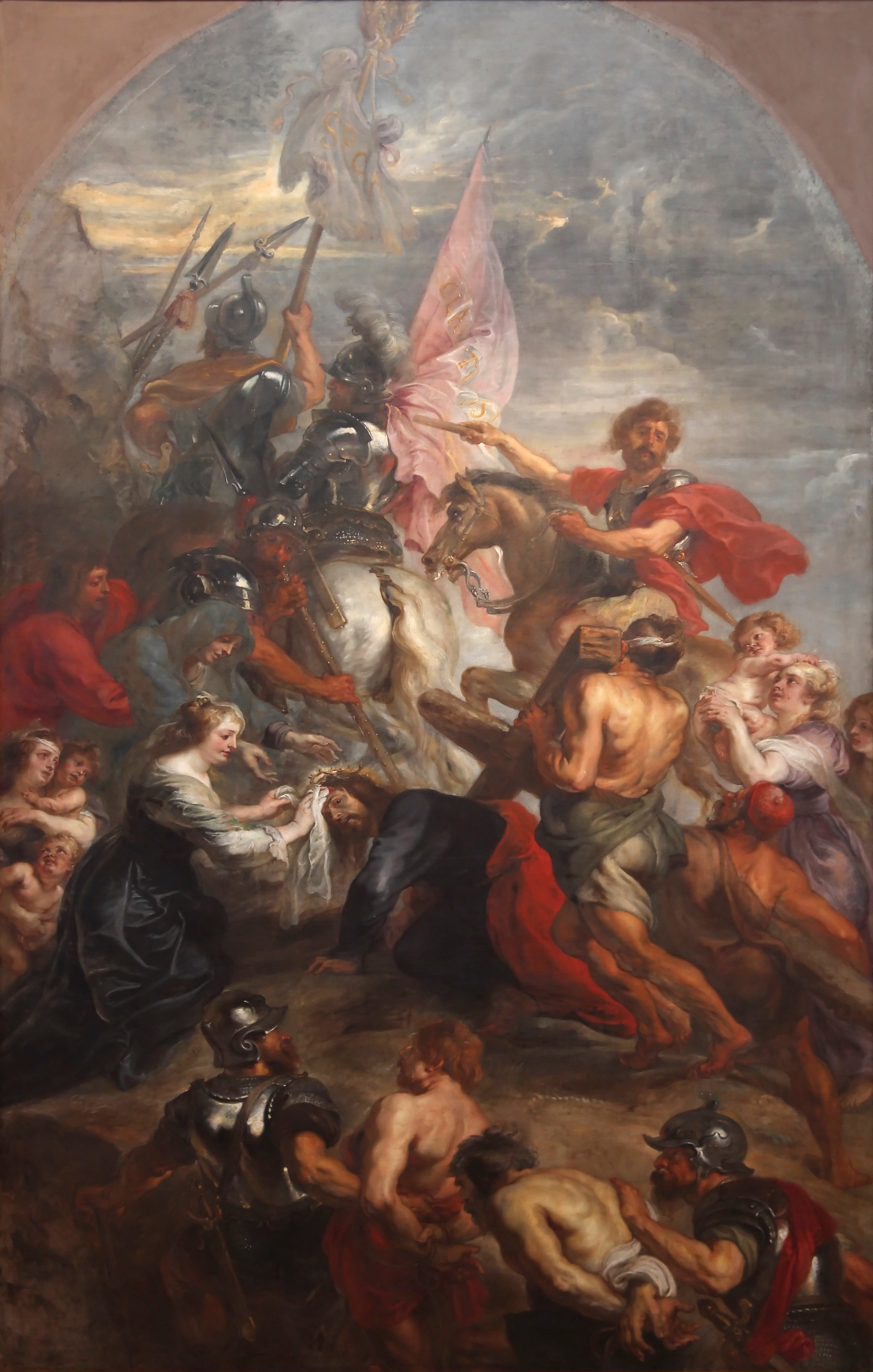
The Road to Calvary, Rubens and workshop, from Affligem Abbey, 1634–1637

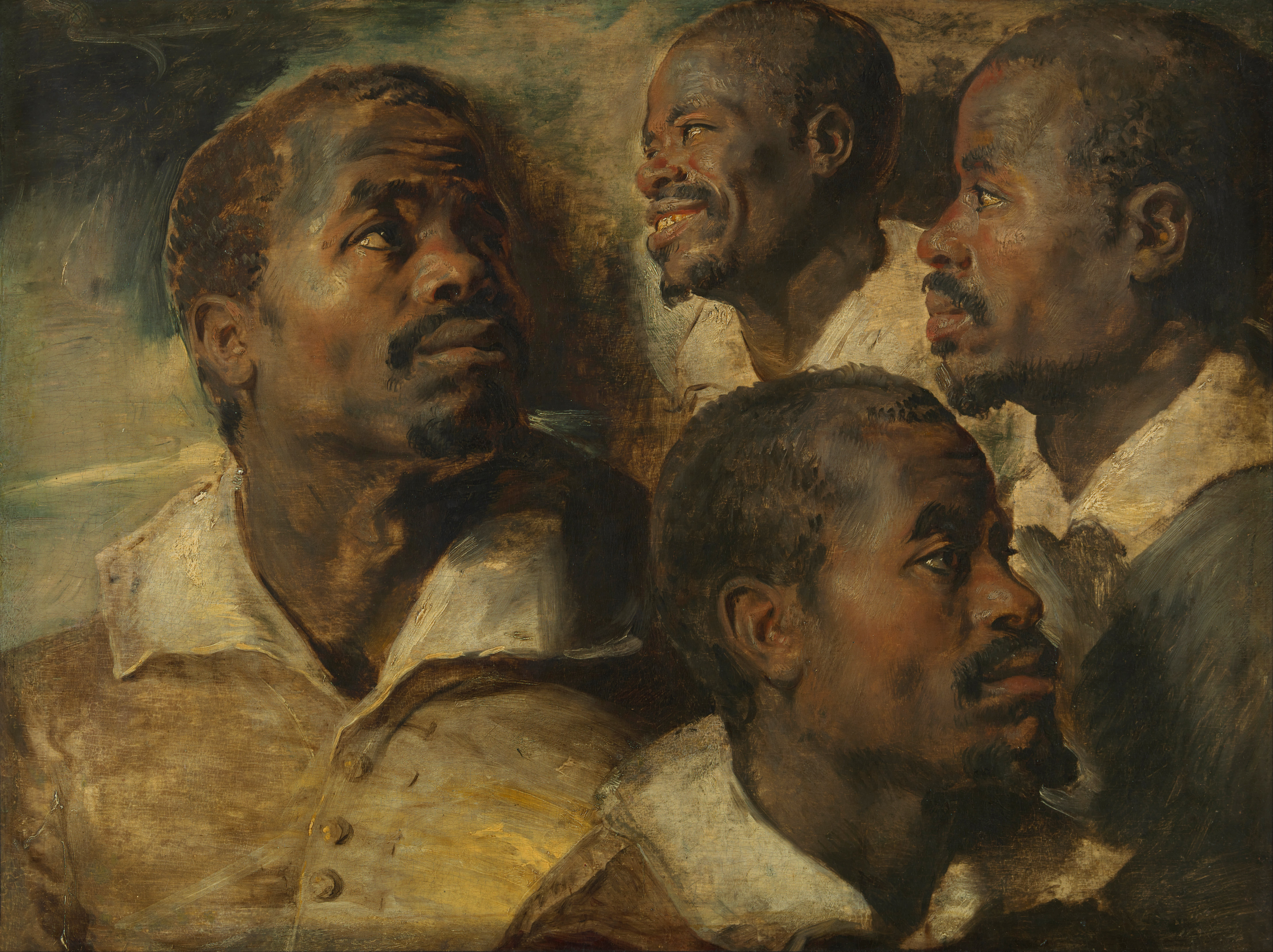
Studies of a black man's head, Rubens, 1640

Other 17th-century Flemish artists in the collection include Jacob Jordaens, Anthony van Dyck, Frans Snyders, Theodoor van Loon, Theodoor van Thulden, Gaspar de Crayer, Abraham van Diepenbeeck, Antoon Sallaert, Denijs van Alsloot, David Teniers the Younger, Adriaen Brouwer and others.

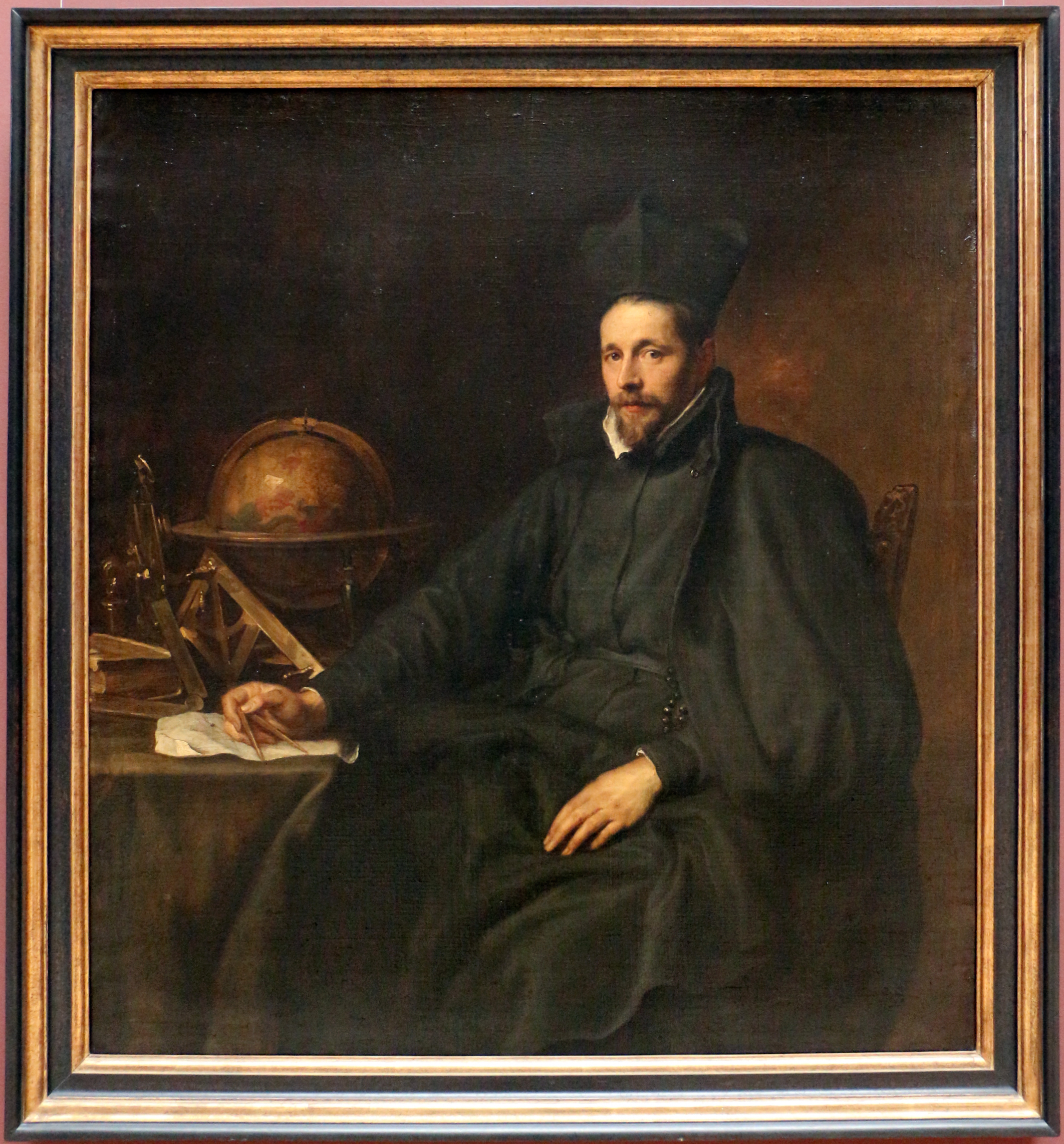
Portrait of Jean-Charles della Faille, Anthony van Dyck, 1629

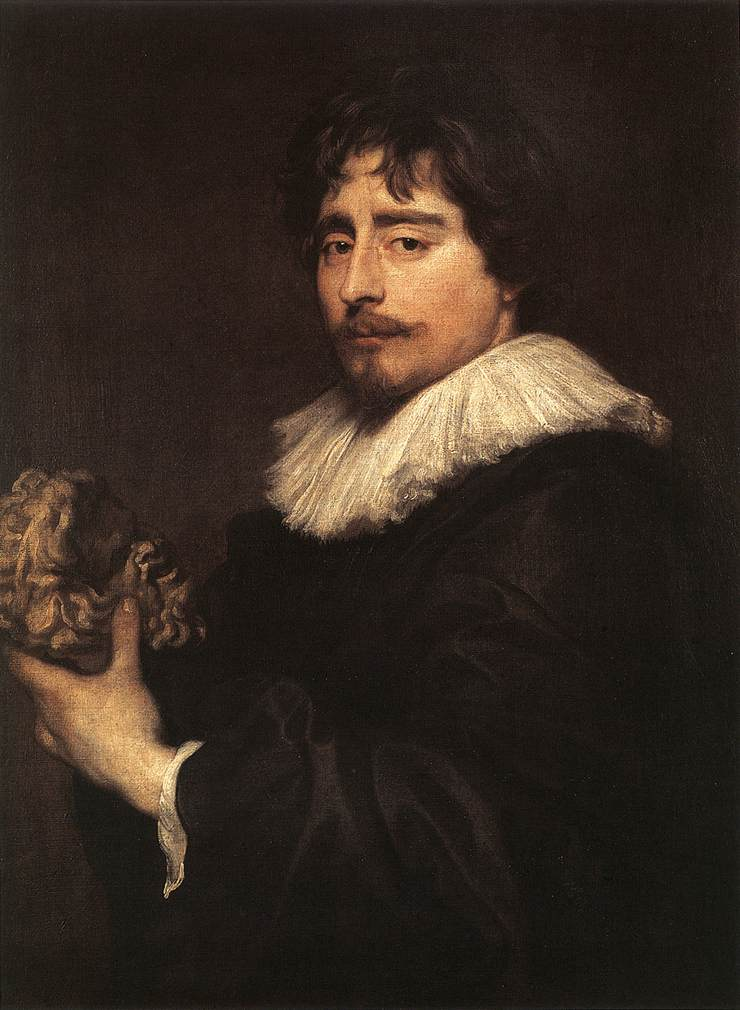
Portrait of the Sculptor Duquesnoy, Van Dyck, 1622

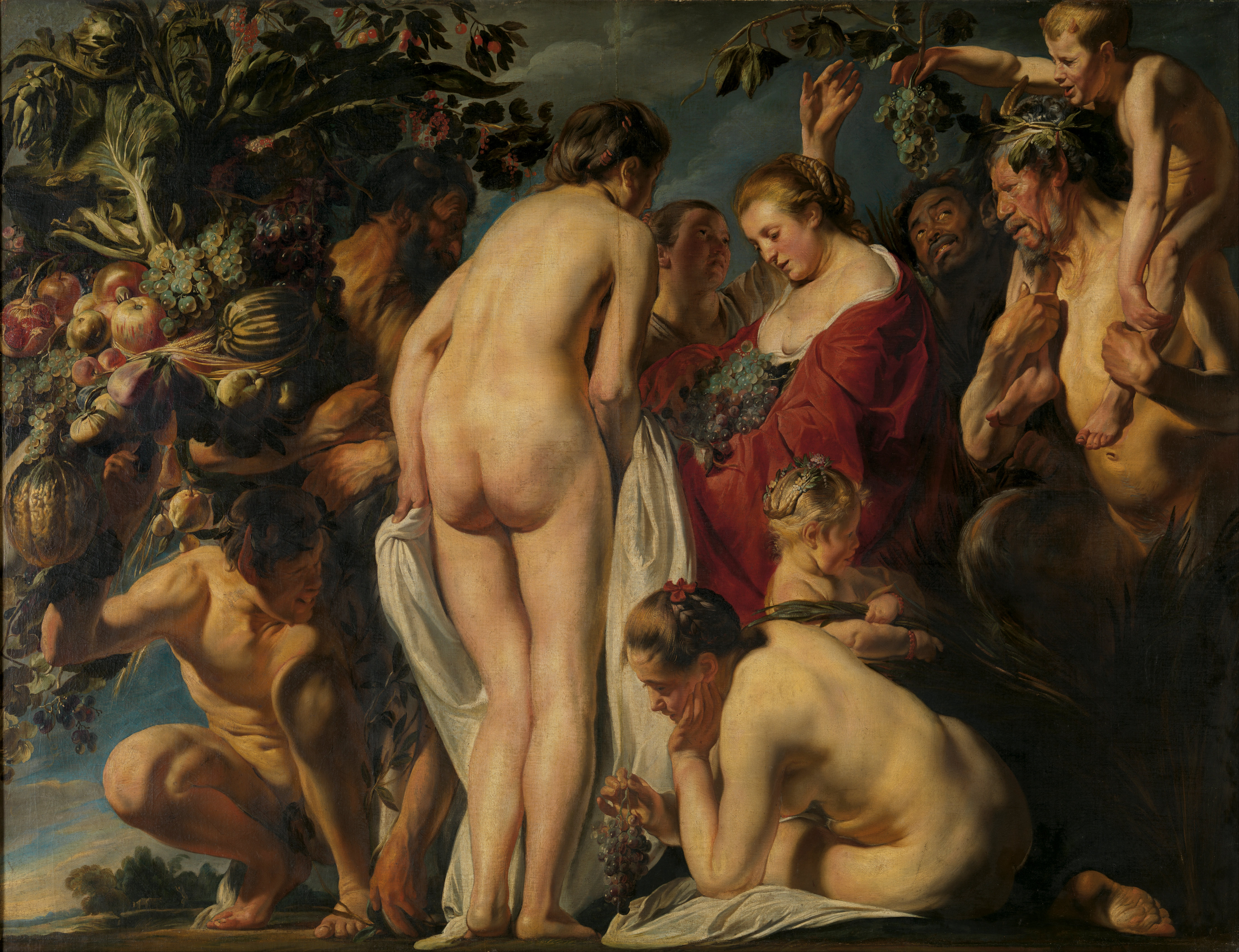
Allegory of Fertility, Jacques Jordaens and Frans Snyders, 1618–1628

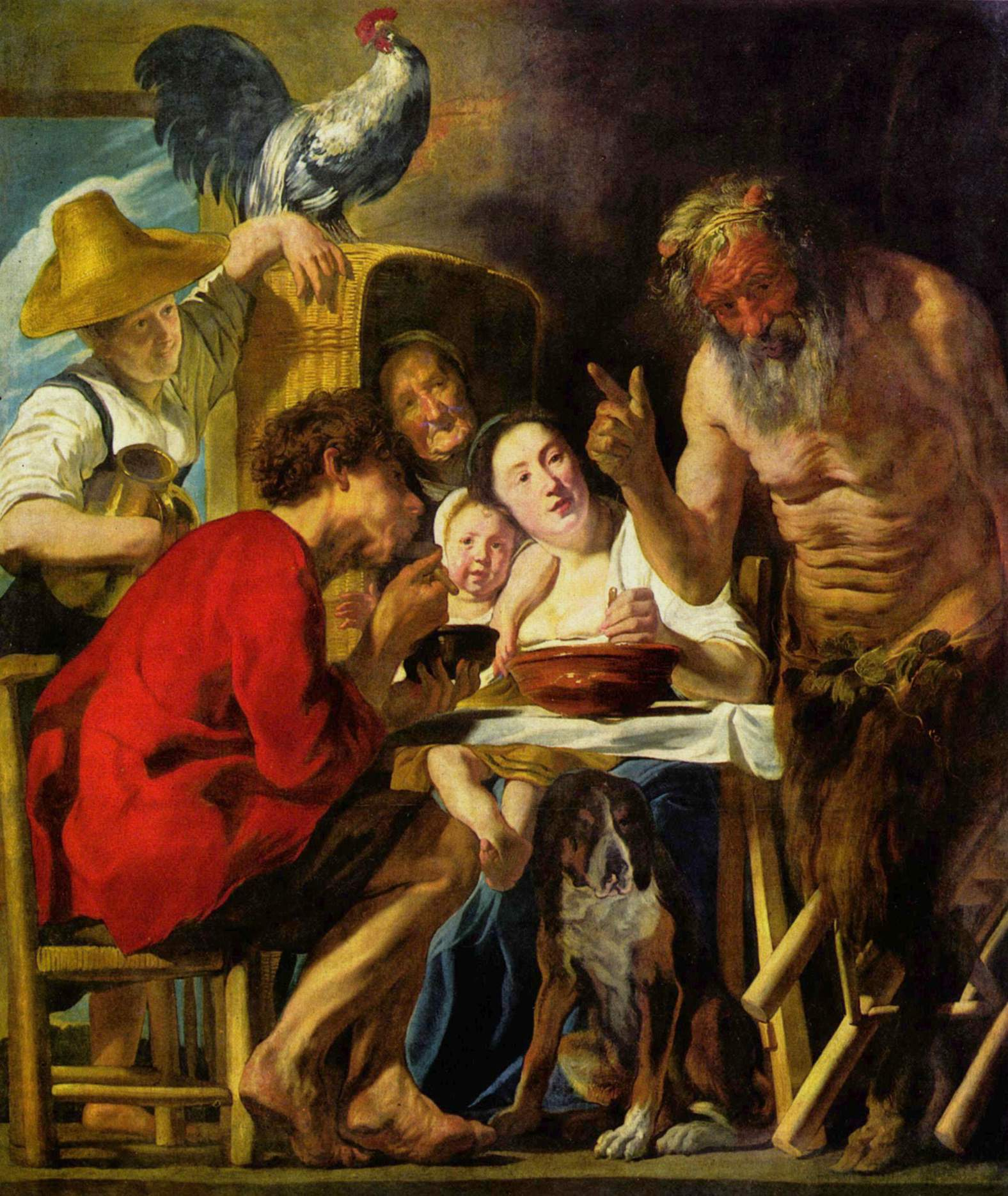
The Satyr and the Peasant, Jordaens, c. 1620

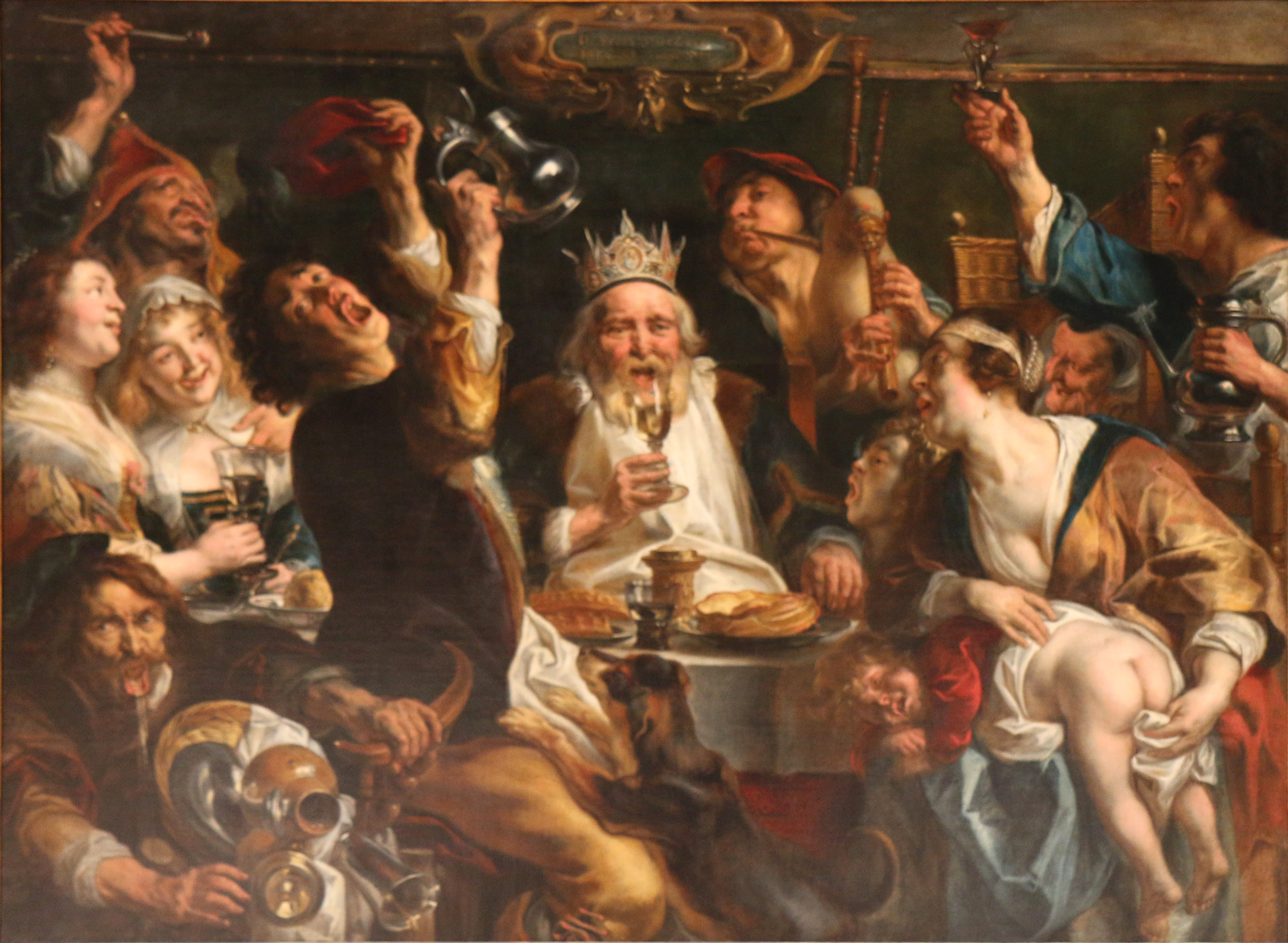
The King Drinks, Jordaens, 1640

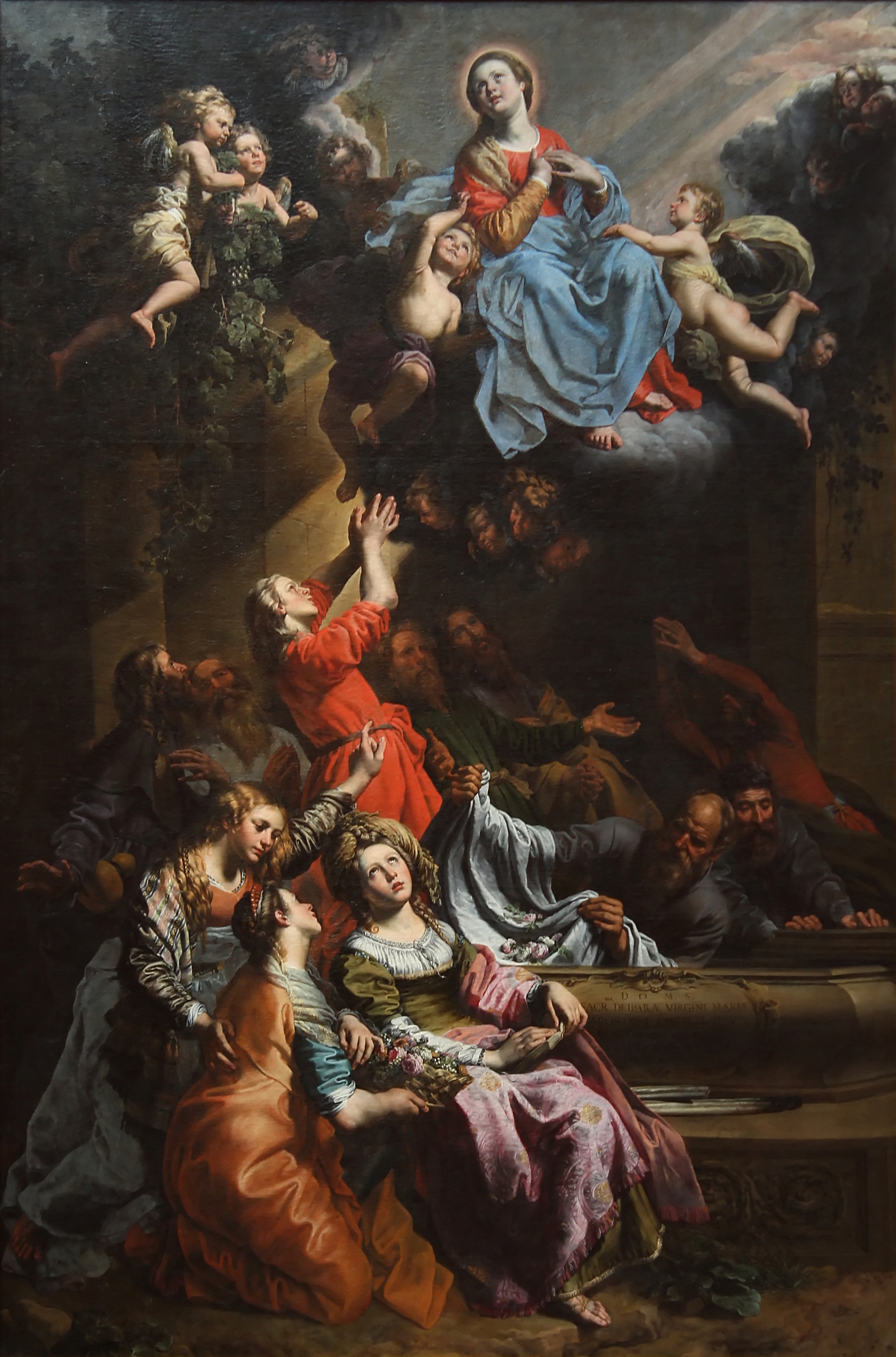
The Assumption of Mary, Theodoor van Loon, 17th century

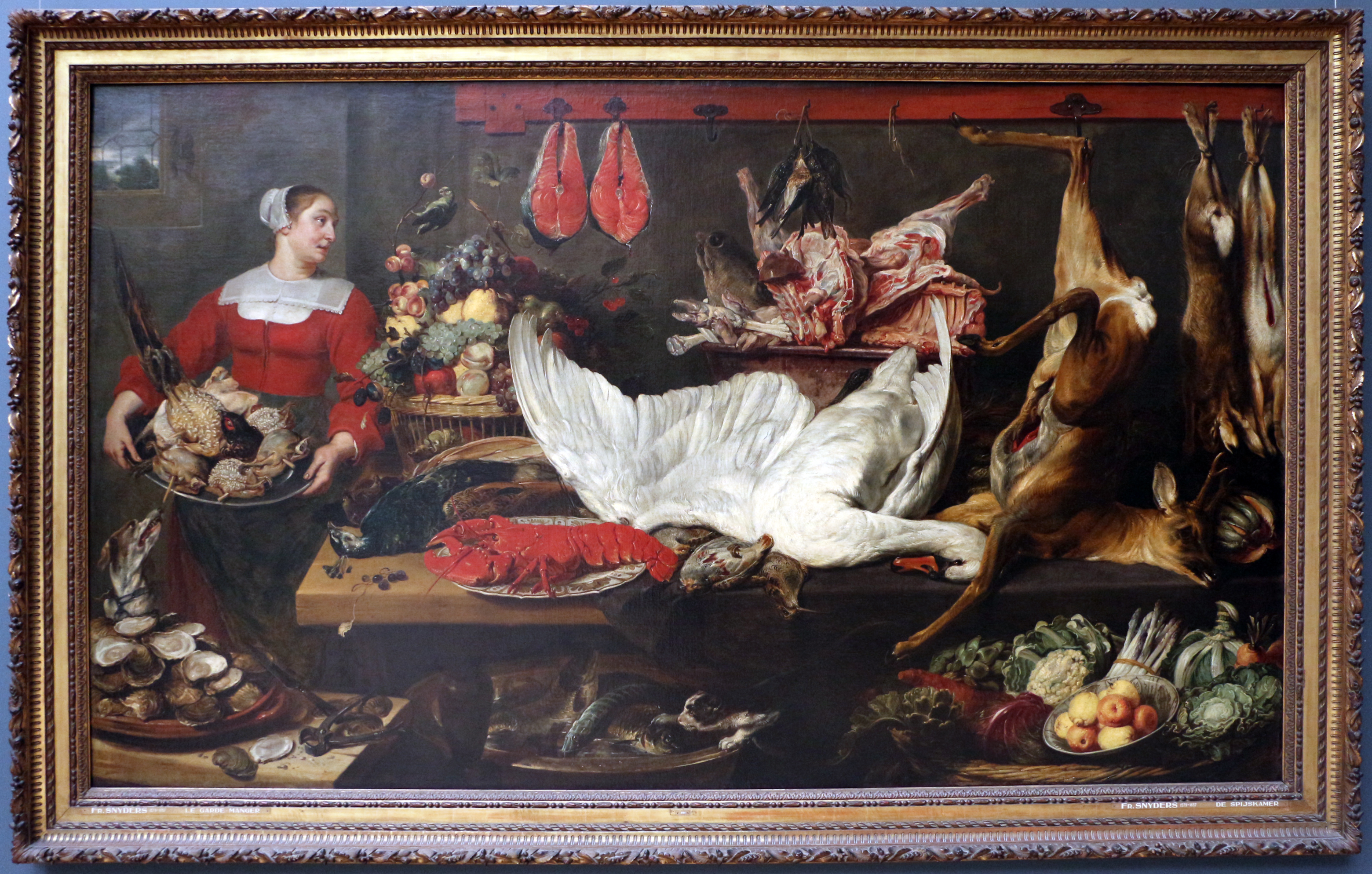
Kitchen Scene, Snyders and Cornelis de Vos, c. 1630–1639

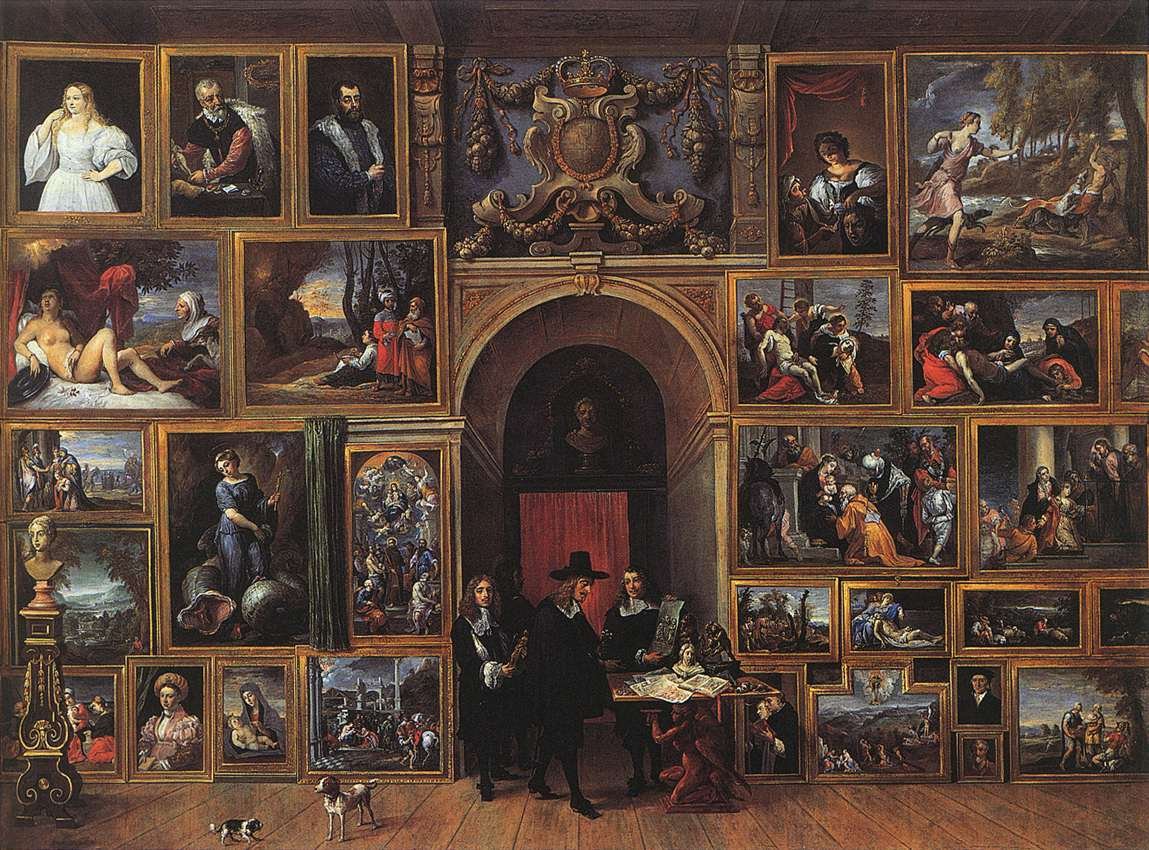
Archduke Leopold Wilhelm in his Gallery in Brussels, David Teniers the Younger, 1651

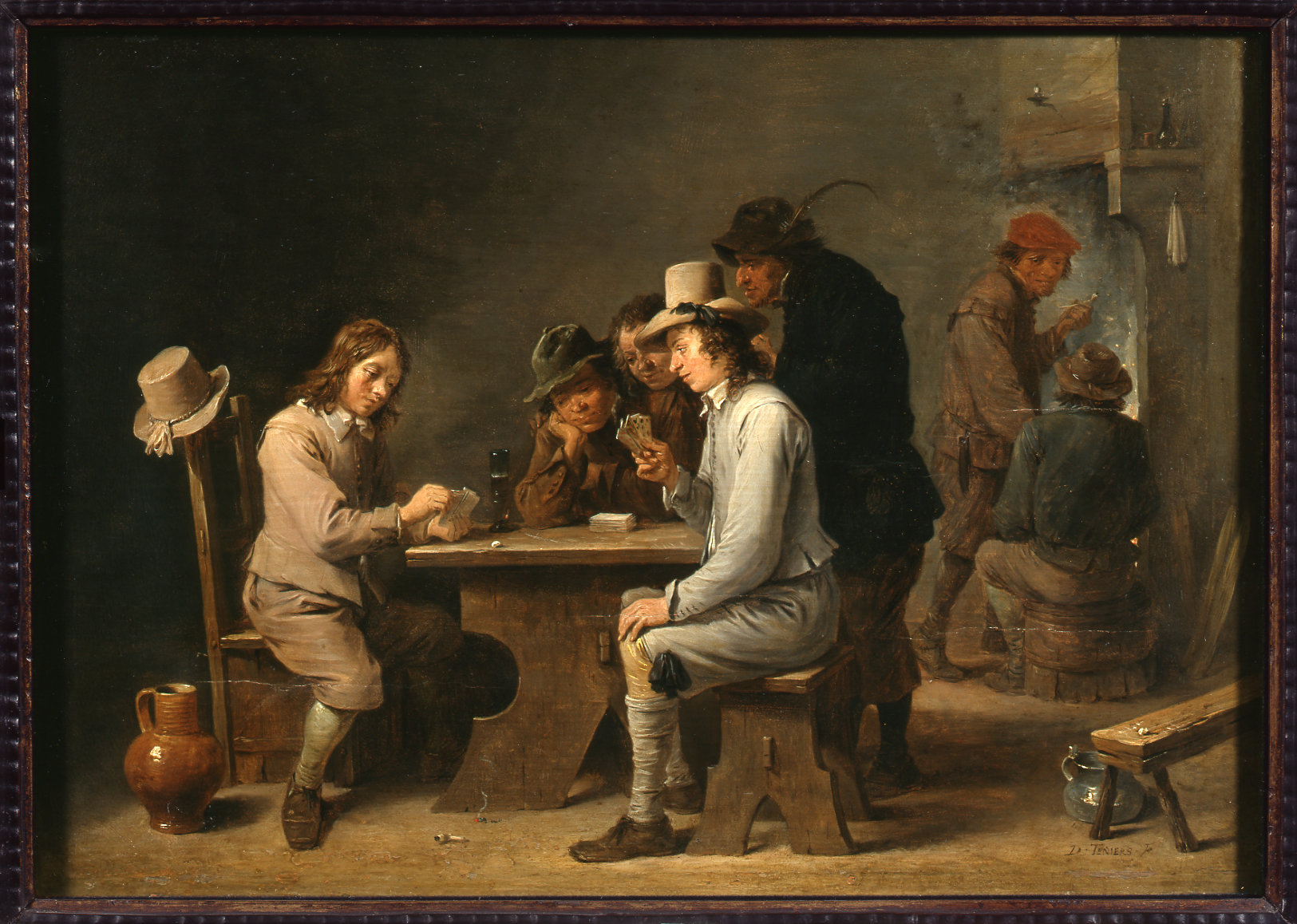
Card Players, Teniers the Younger, c. 1660–1690

The collection includes works by 17th-century Dutch artists including Rembrandt, Frans Hals, Abraham Bloemaert, Jan Asselijn, Melchior de Hondecoeter, Meindert Hobbema, Salomon van Ruisdael, Jacob van Ruisdael, Gerard Dou, Pieter de Hooch, Jan Steen, Paulus Potter, Rachel Ruysch, Gabriel Metsu, Nicolaes Berchem, Nicolas Maes, Bartholomeus van der Helst, Emanuel de Witte, Adriaen van Ostade and others.

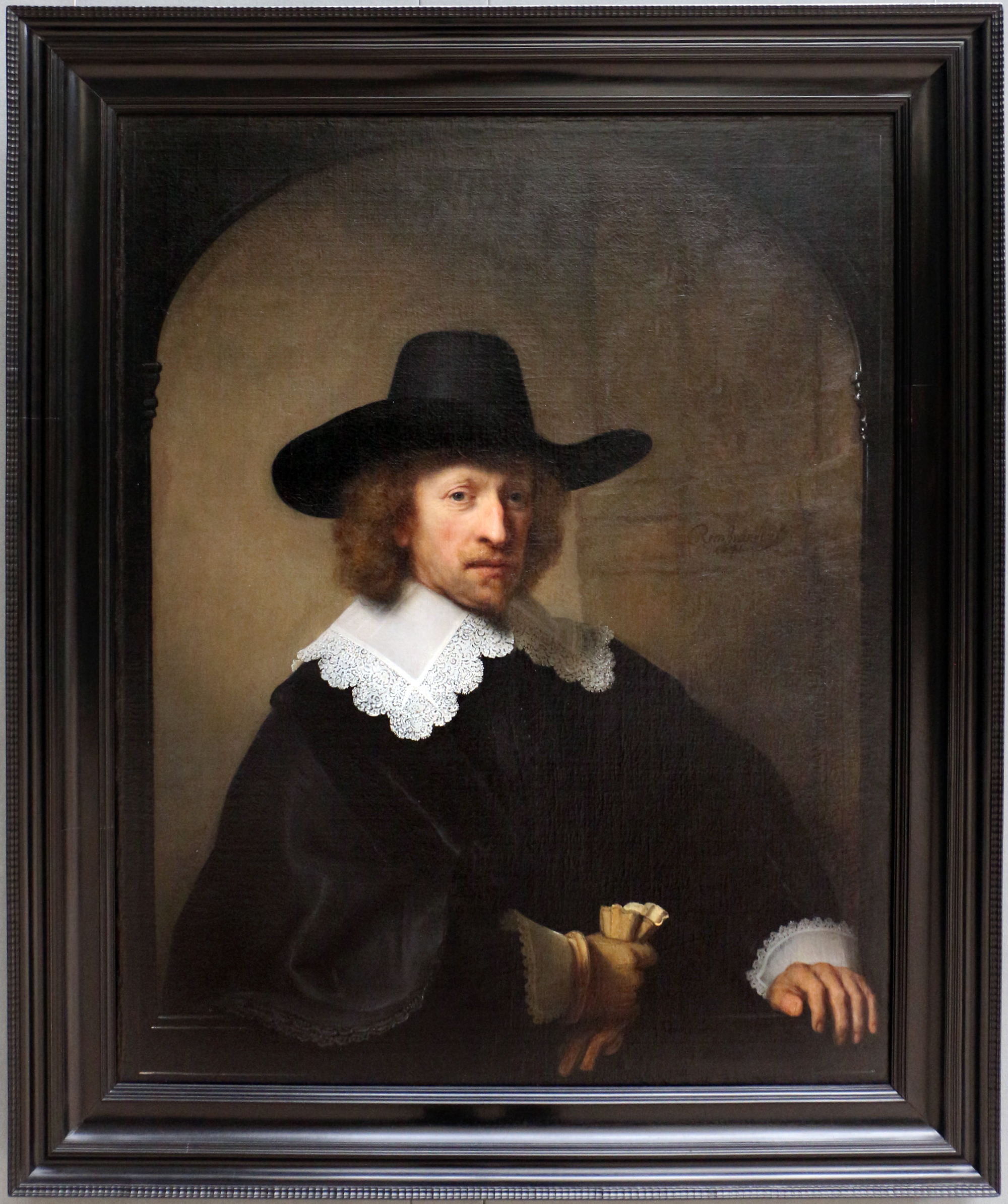
Portrait of Nicolaas van Bambeeck, Rembrandt, 1641

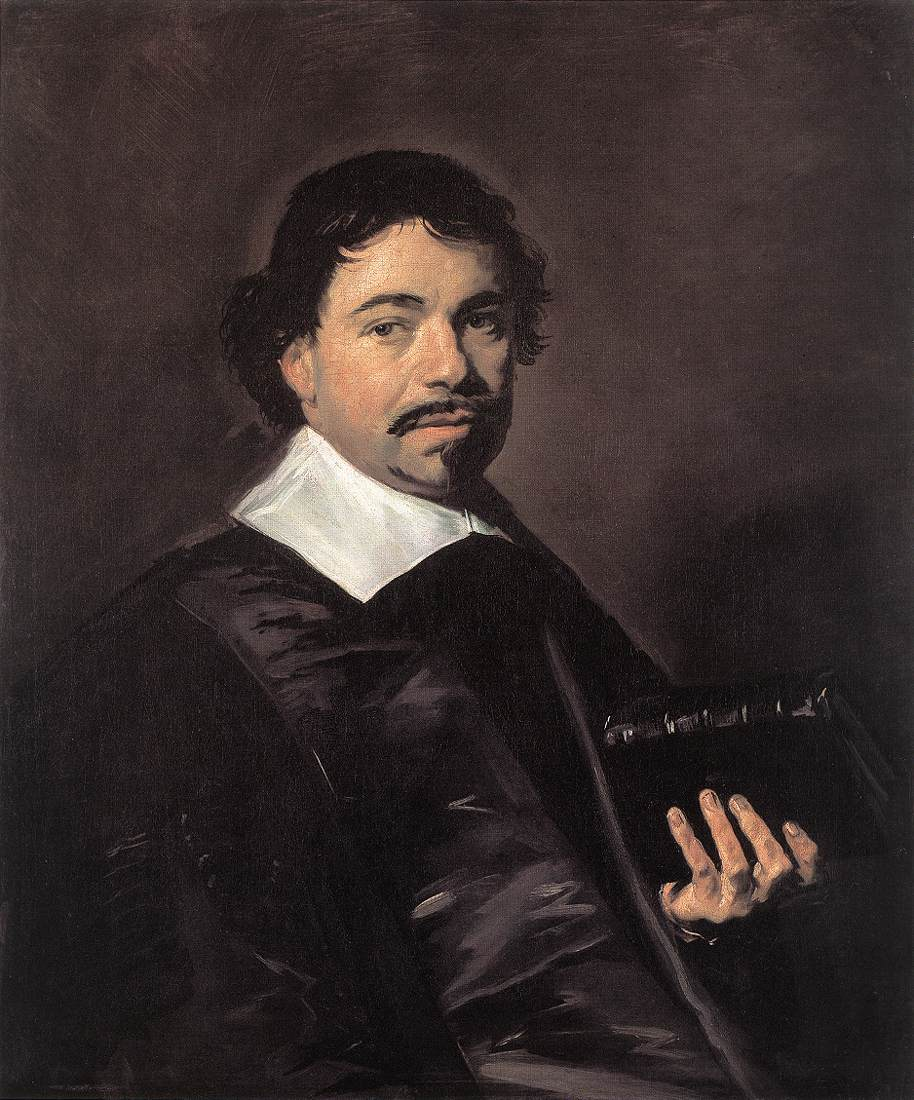
Portrait of Johannes Hoornbeek, Frans Hals, 1645

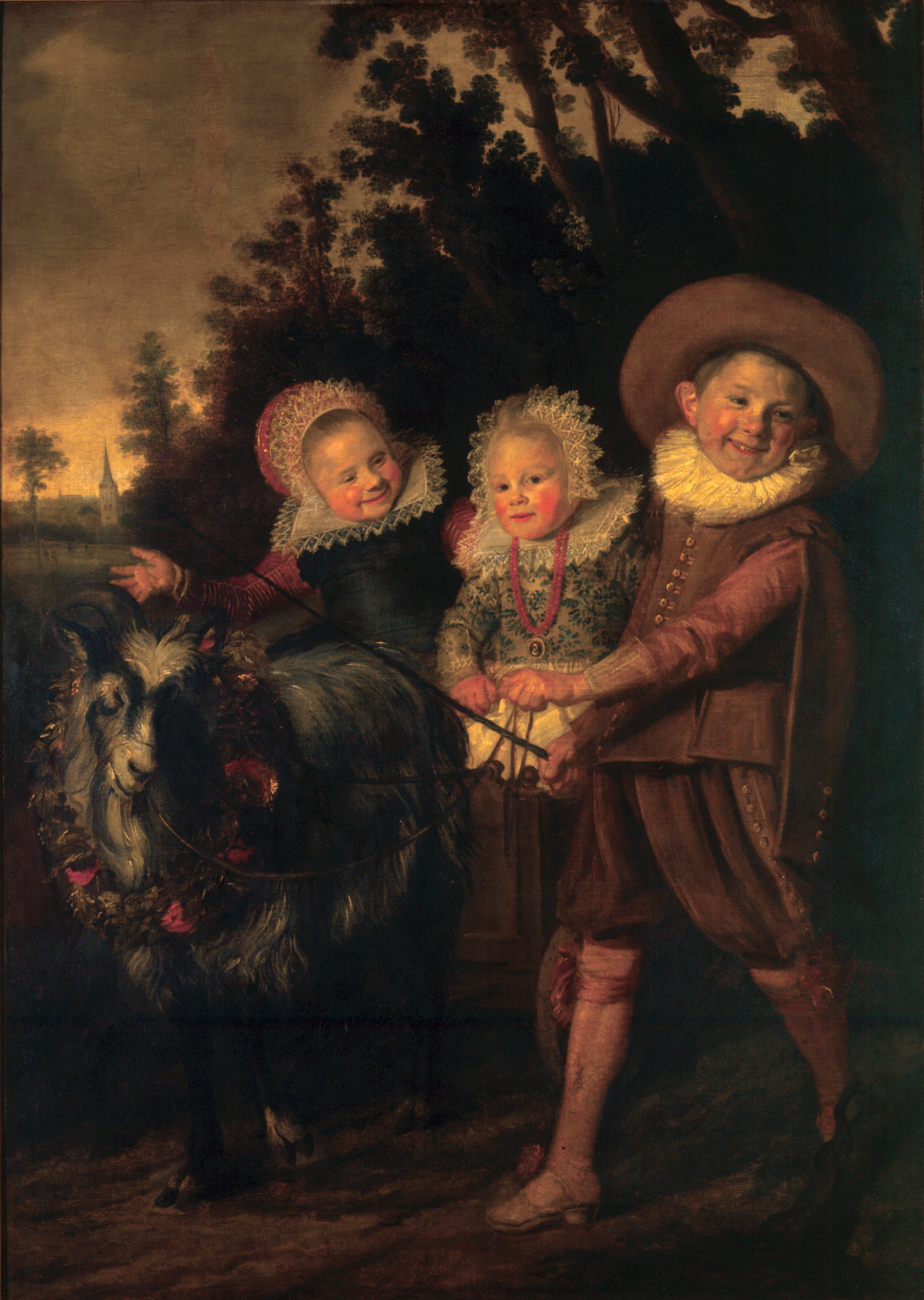
Right half of Gijsbert Claesz. van Campen family portrait, Hals, c. 1620

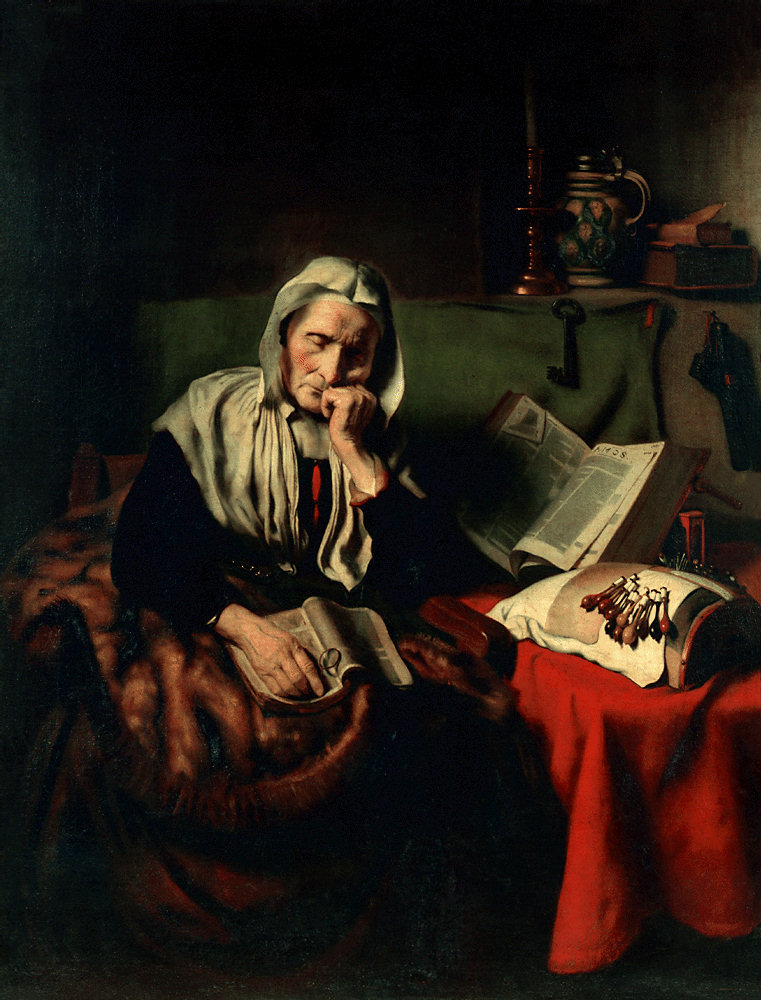
Old Woman Dozing, Nicolaes Maes, c. 1656

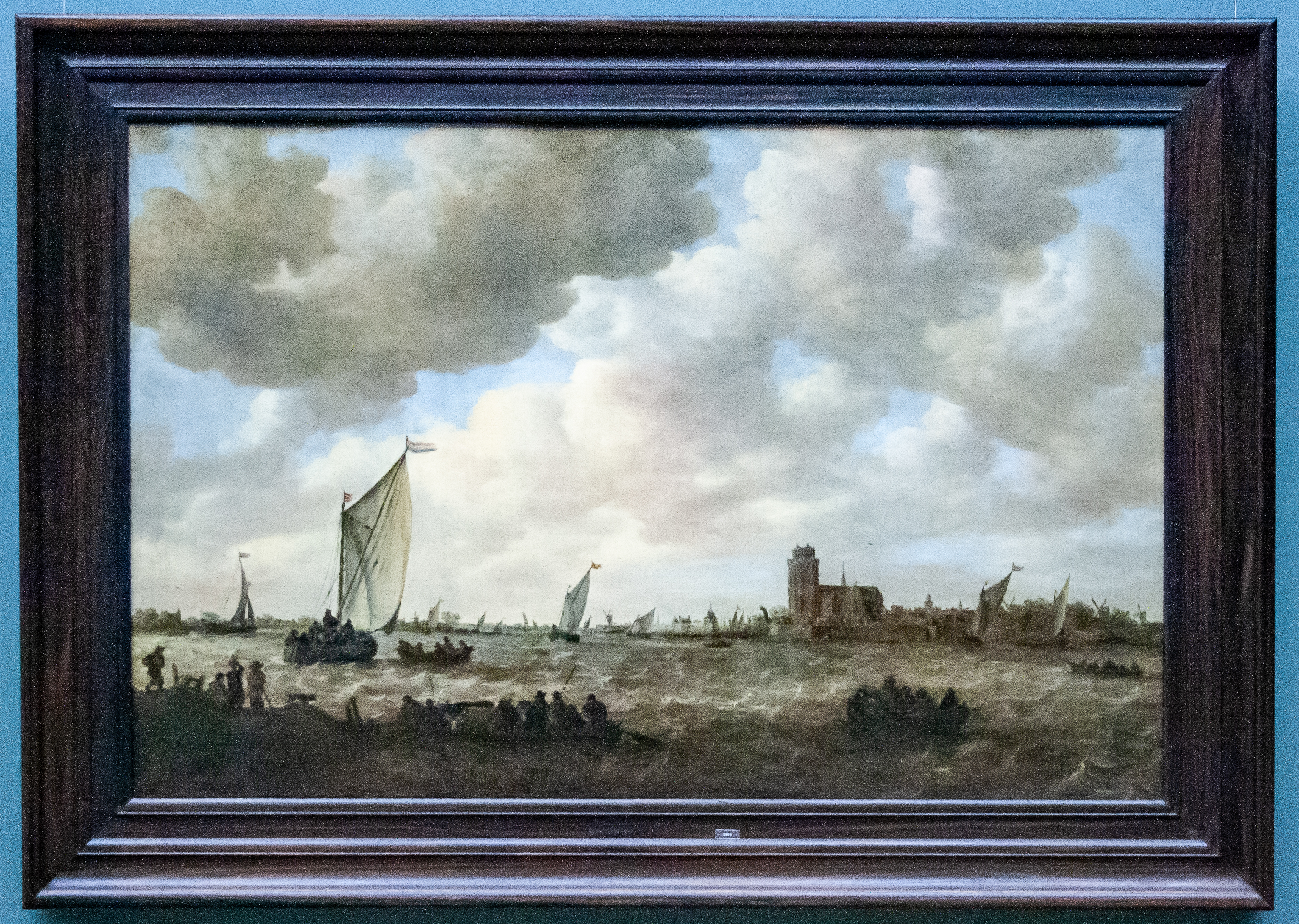
View of Dordrecht From the Dordtse Kil, Jan van Goyen, 1644 or 1653

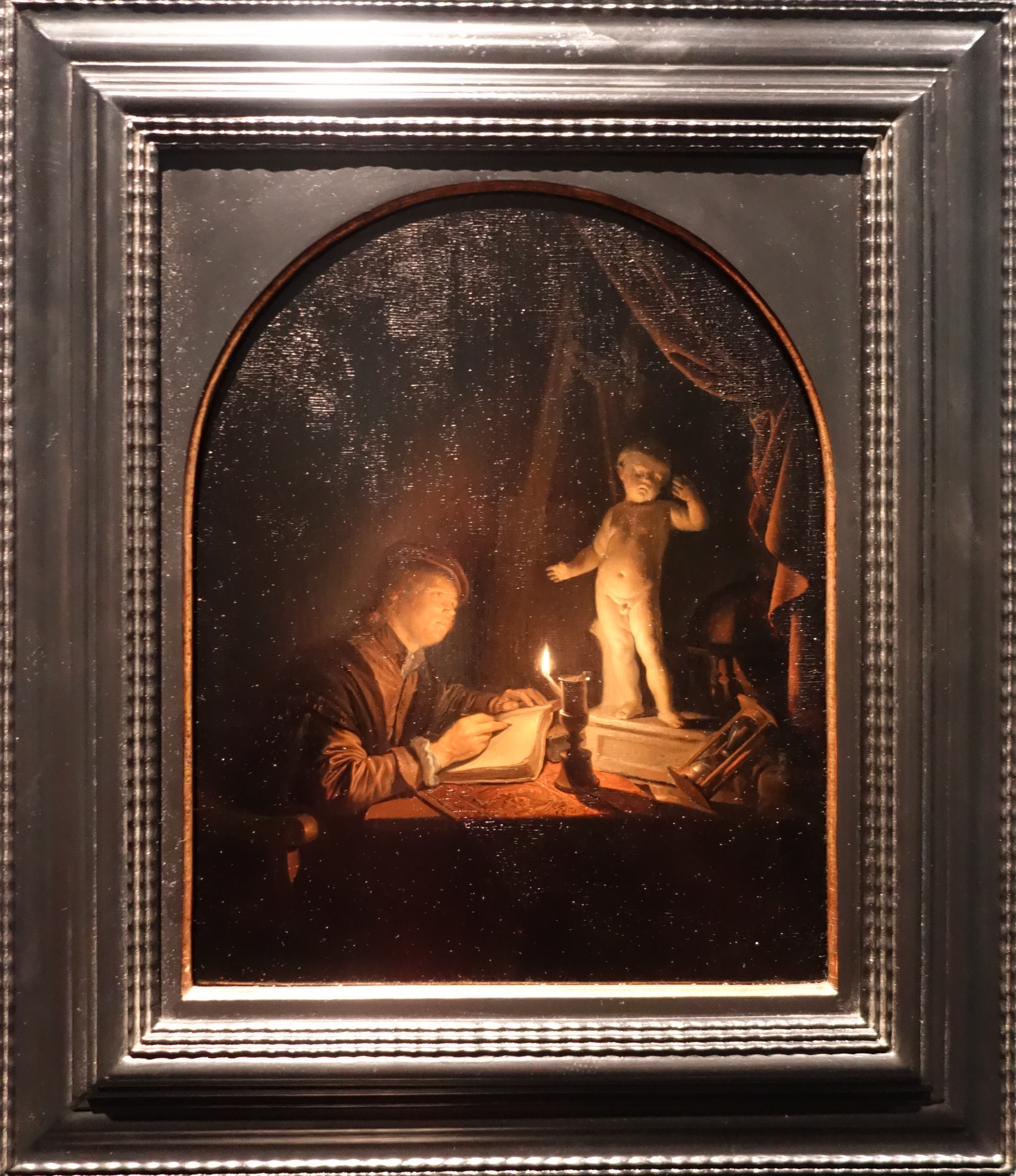
Portrait of an Artist Drawing, Gerard Dou, 17th century

The French and Italian artists of the 16th to the 18th century include Corneille de Lyon, Philippe de Champaigne (born and trained in Brussels), Simon Vouet, Pierre Mignard, Federico Barocci, Giovanni Battista Tiepolo and others. The museum has the prime version of Apollo and Marsyas by Jusepe de Ribera.

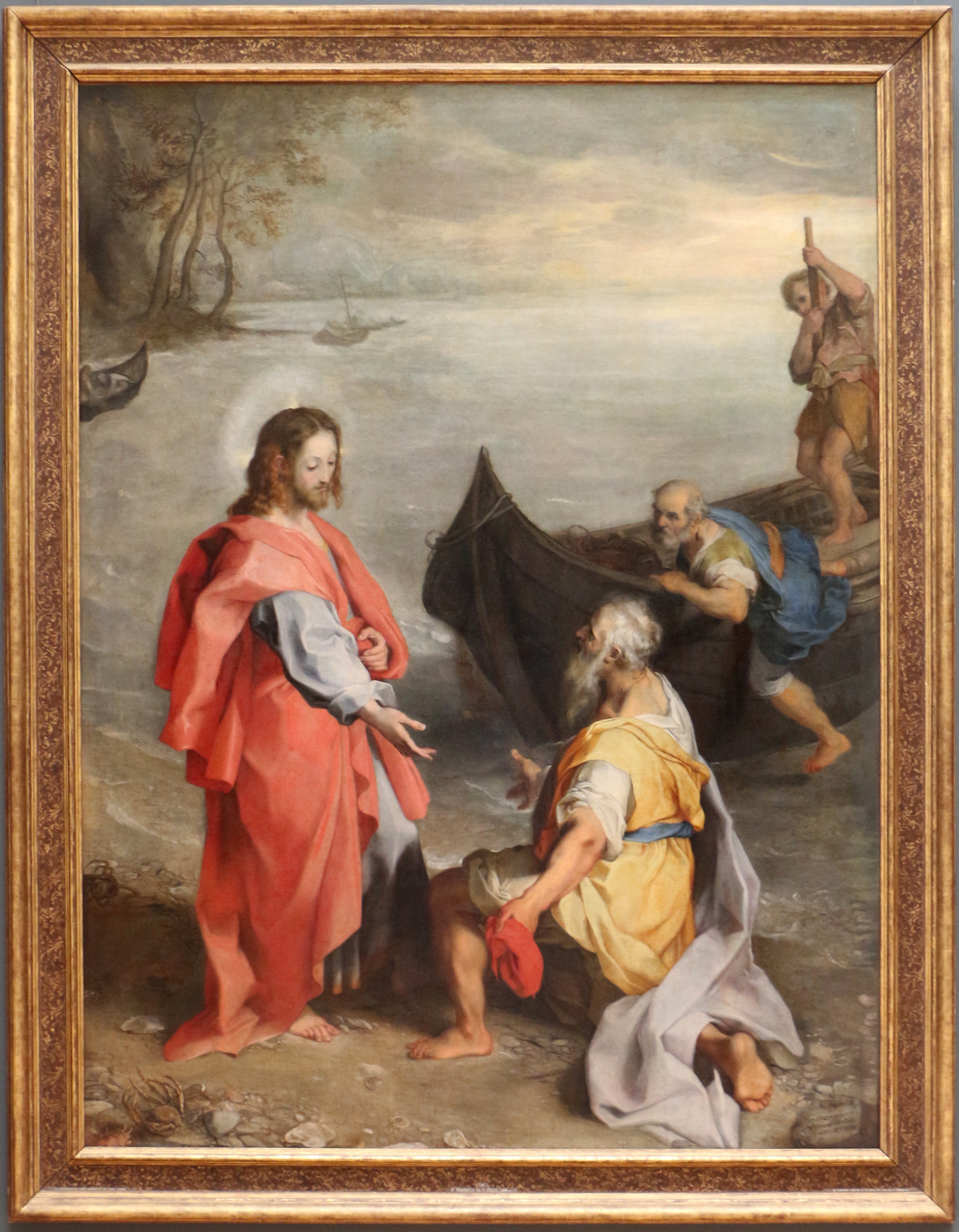
The calling of St Peter and St Andrew, Federico Barocci, 1586

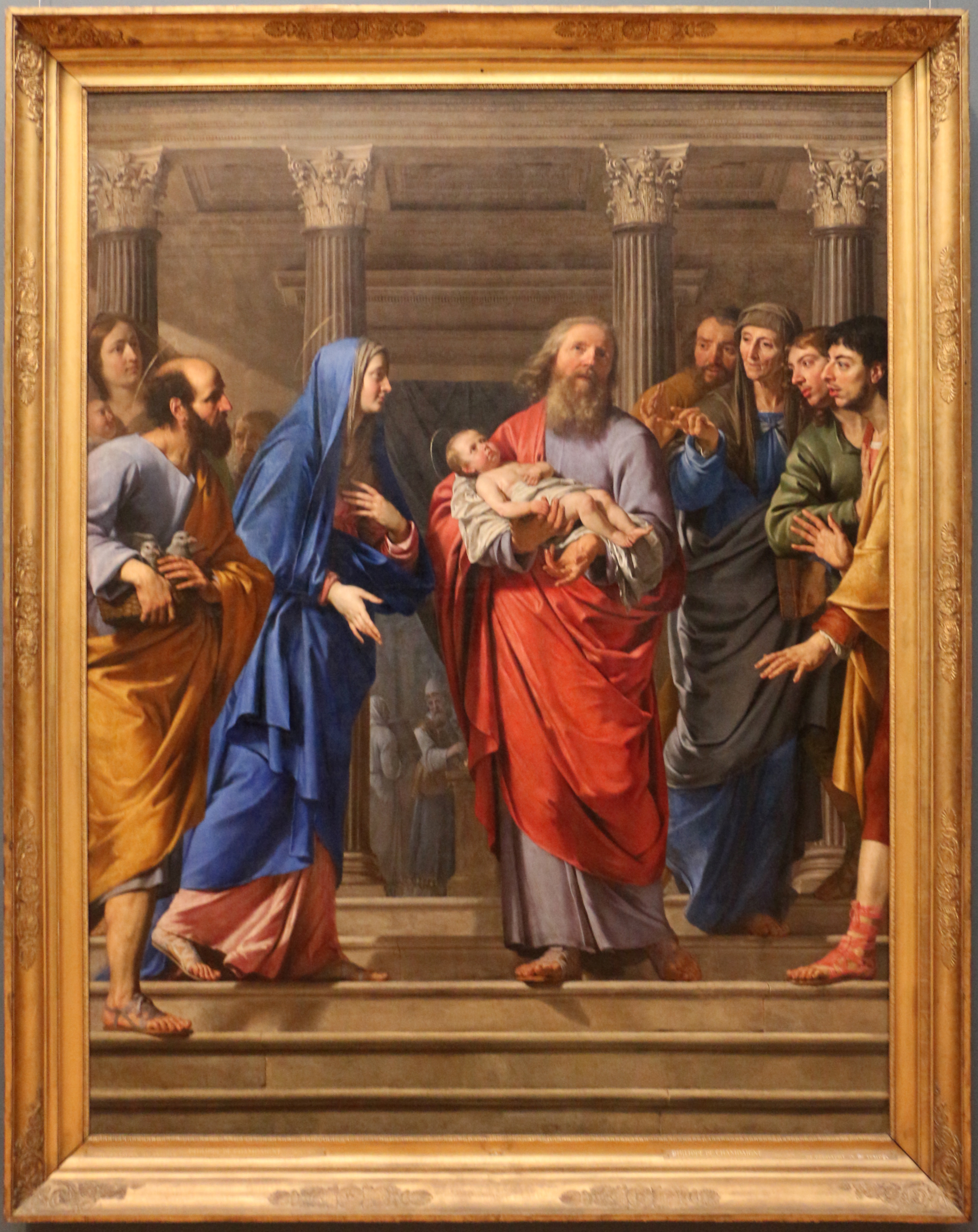
Jesus presented in the temple, Philippe de Champaigne, 1648

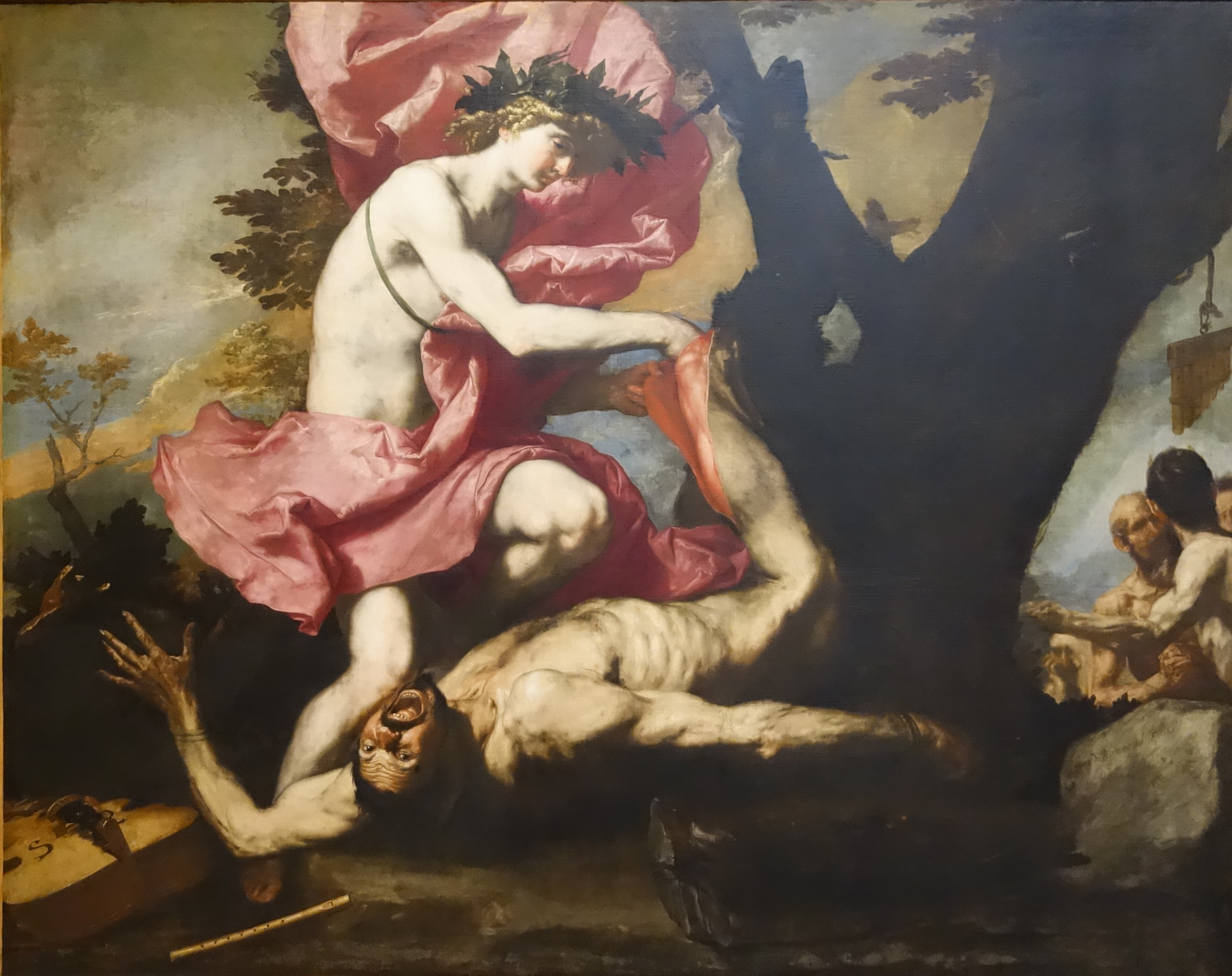
Apollo and Marsyas, Jusepe de Ribera, 1637

The Death of Marat by Jacques-Louis David is an iconic work in the museum collection. Mars Being Disarmed by Venus was David's last painting, produced in Brussels. Gustaf Wappers' huge Episode of the Belgian Revolution of 1830, painted very soon after the event, is a famous evocation of it.

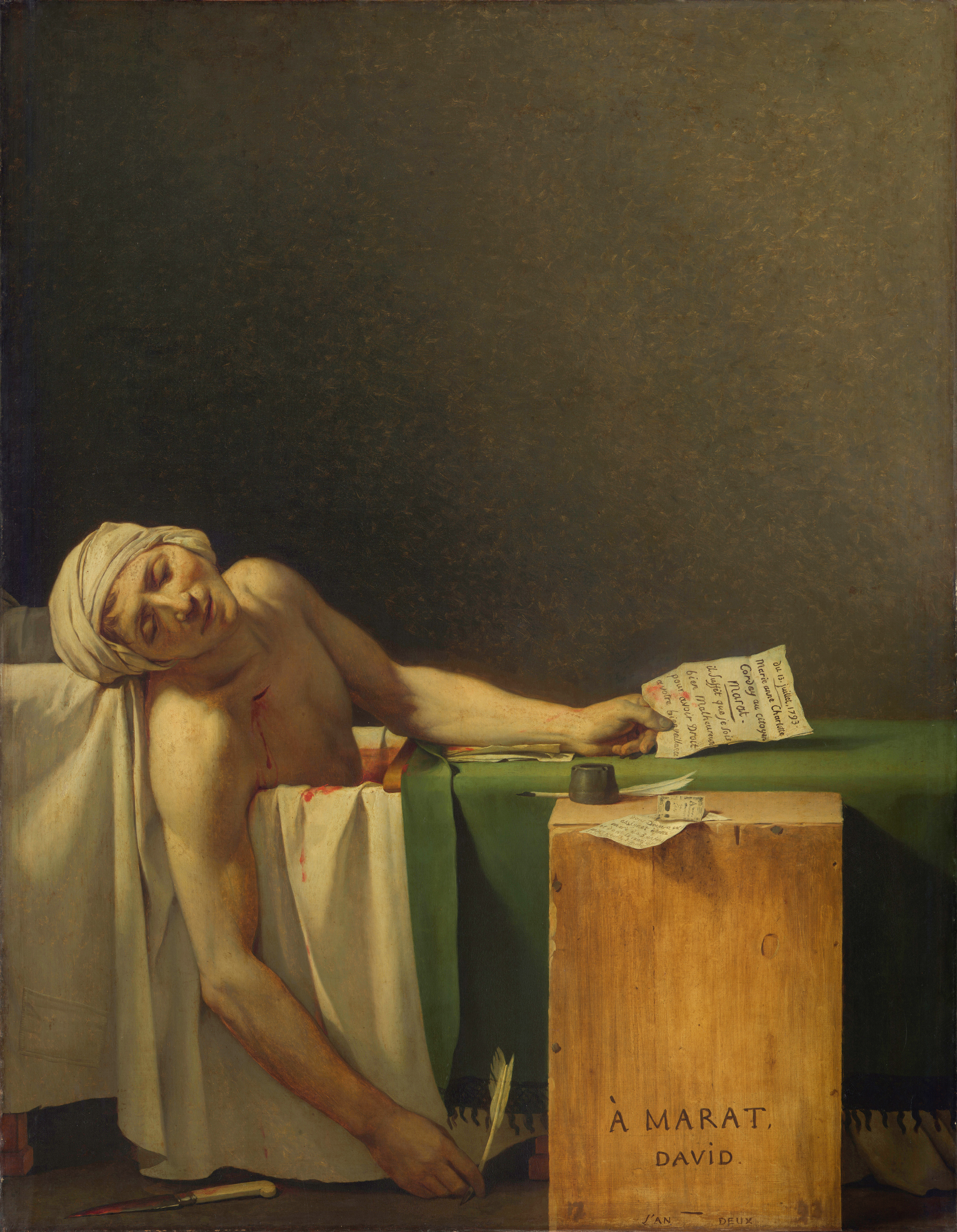
The Death of Marat, Jacques-Louis David, 1793

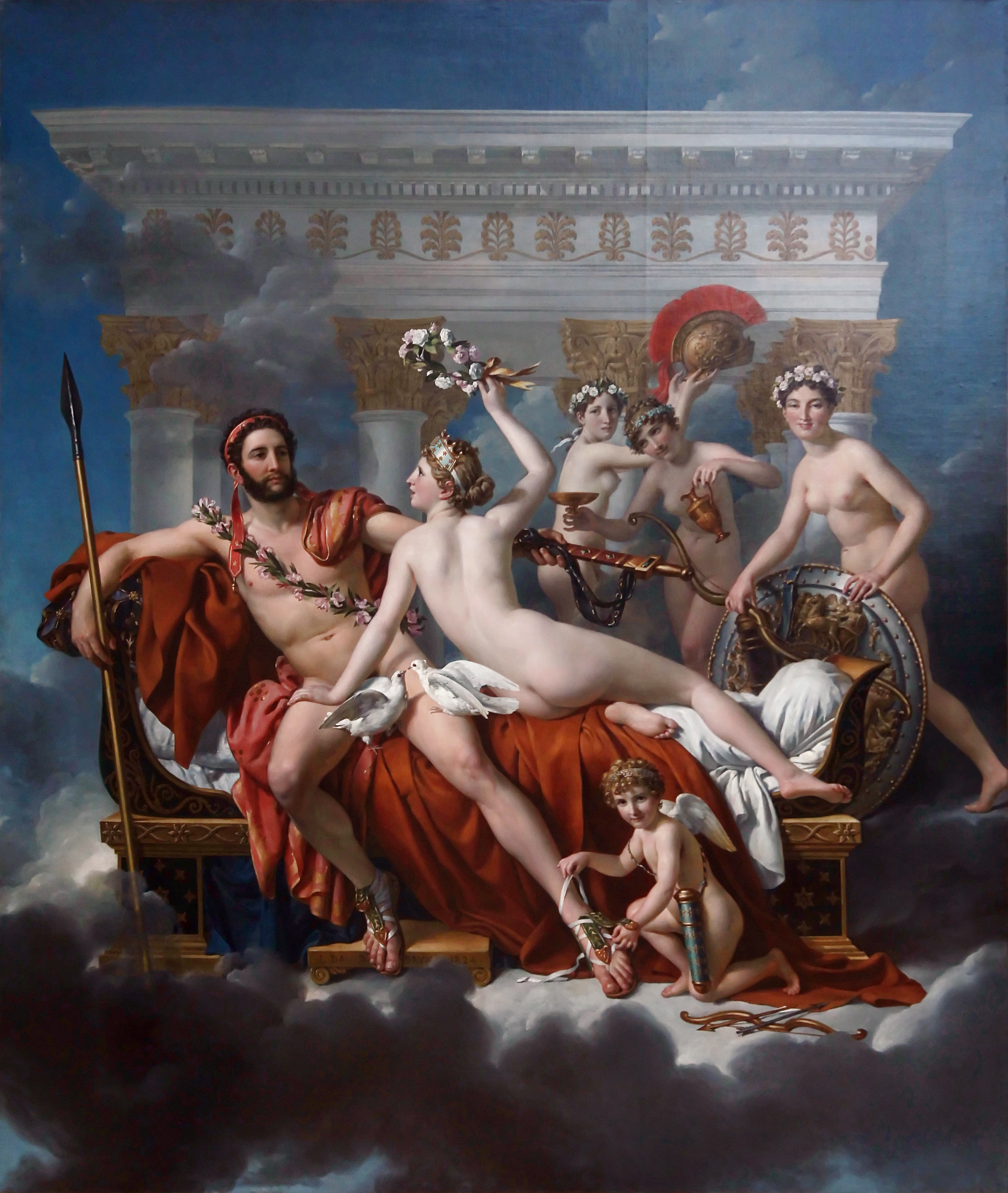
Mars Being Disarmed by Venus, David, 1822–1824

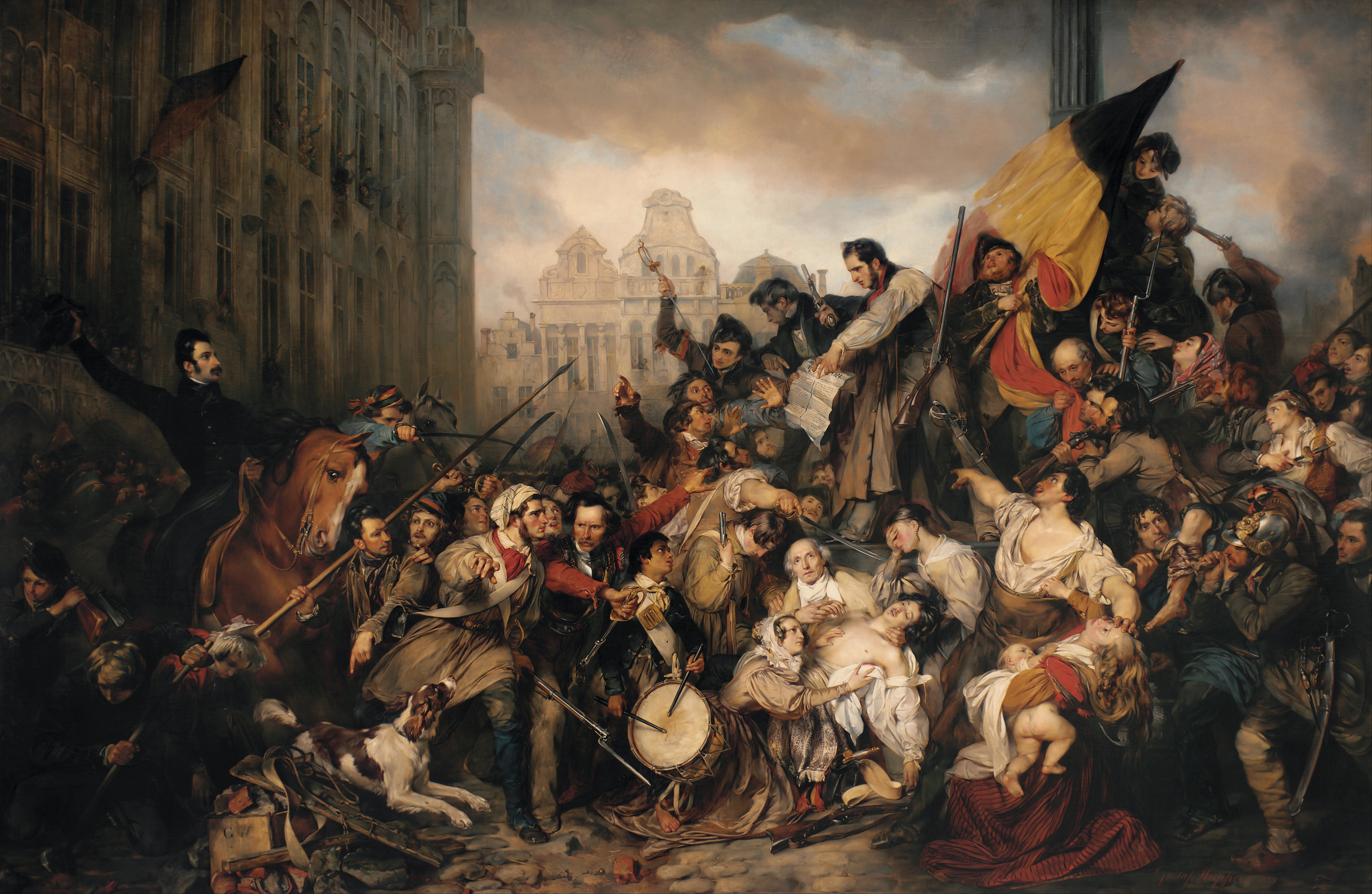
Episode of the Belgian Revolution of 1830, Gustaf Wappers, 1834

== Building ==
=== Exterior ===
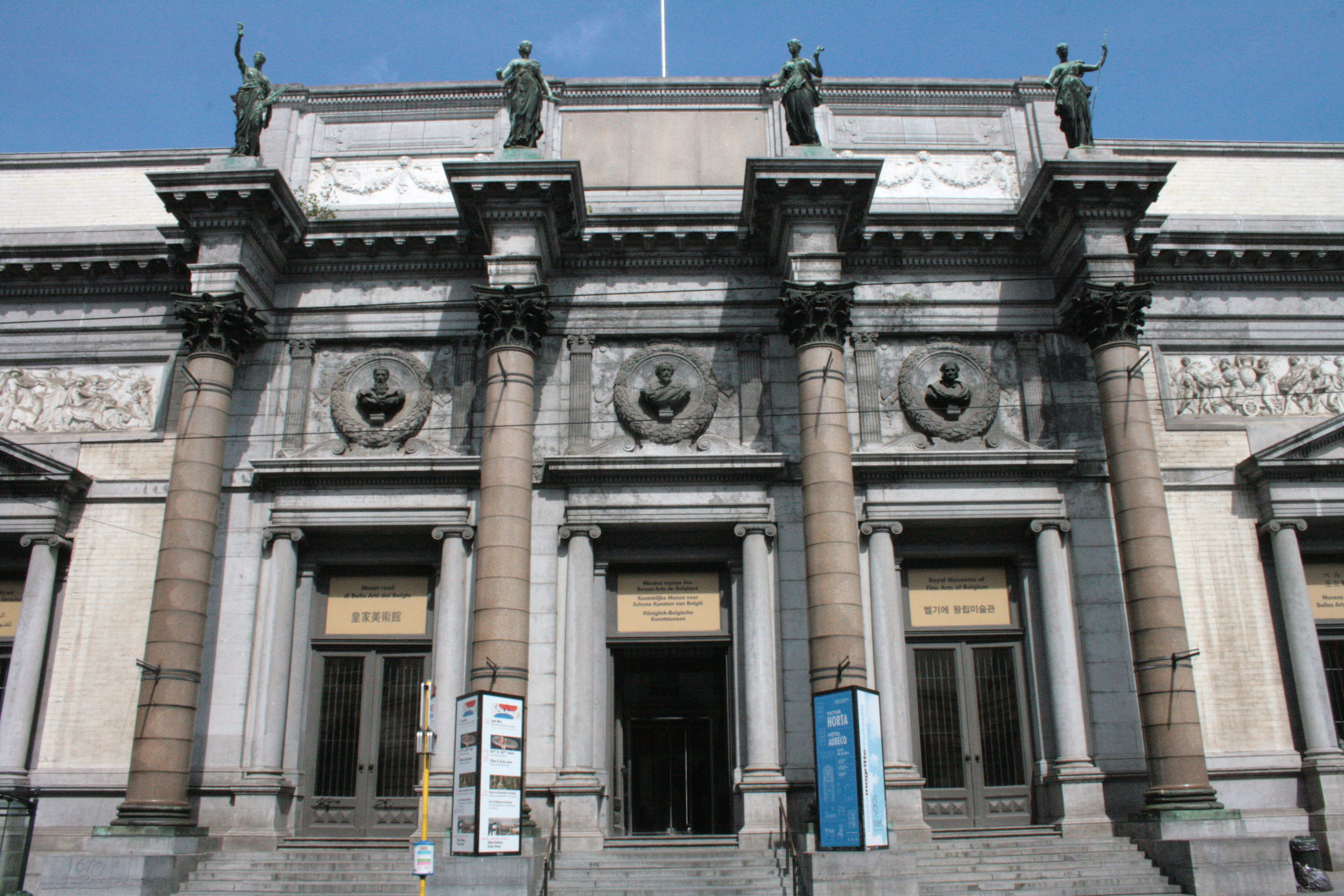
Entrance to the museum in the Palace of Fine Arts

The main building that now houses the Oldmasters Museum was built as the Palace of Fine Arts (French: Palais des Beaux-Arts, Dutch: Paleis voor Schone Kunsten). It was designed by the architect Alphonse Balat and funded by King Leopold II. Balat was the king's principal architect, and the building was one part of the king's vast construction projects for Belgium. It was opened in 1880, and has housed the Royal Museum of Ancient Art since 1887 following the move there of the works of the Old Masters. Built in an eclectic style of classical inspiration, it stands as an example of the Beaux-Arts use of themed statuary to assert the building's identity and meaning.

The building's extensive programme of architectural sculpture includes four allegorical figures, symbolising Music, Architecture, Sculpture, and Painting, atop the four main piers, the work of sculptors Guillaume de Groot, Louis Samain, Joseph Geefs, and Égide Mélot, respectively. The gilded finial, The Genius of the Arts, originally part of the Monument to the Dynasty in Laeken, was also designed by de Groot. The three rondels representing Rubens, Van Ruysbroek, and Jean de Bologne, symbolising Painting, Architecture, and Sculpture respectively, are the work of Antoine van Rasbourg, Antoine-Félix Bouré and Jean Cuypers. The two bas-relief panels symbolise Music by Thomas Vincotte, and Industrial Arts by Charles Brunin. The two bronze groups on pedestals represent The Crowning of Art by Paul de Vigne, and The Teaching of Art by Charles van der Stappen.

On the side of the building, a memorial commemorates five members of the National Royalist Movement, a resistance group killed during the liberation of Brussels on 3–4 September 1944. Alongside the building's western face is a sculpture garden, landscaped in 1992, with works by Aristide Maillol, Emilio Greco, Bernhard Heiliger and Dolf Ledel.

=== Interior ===
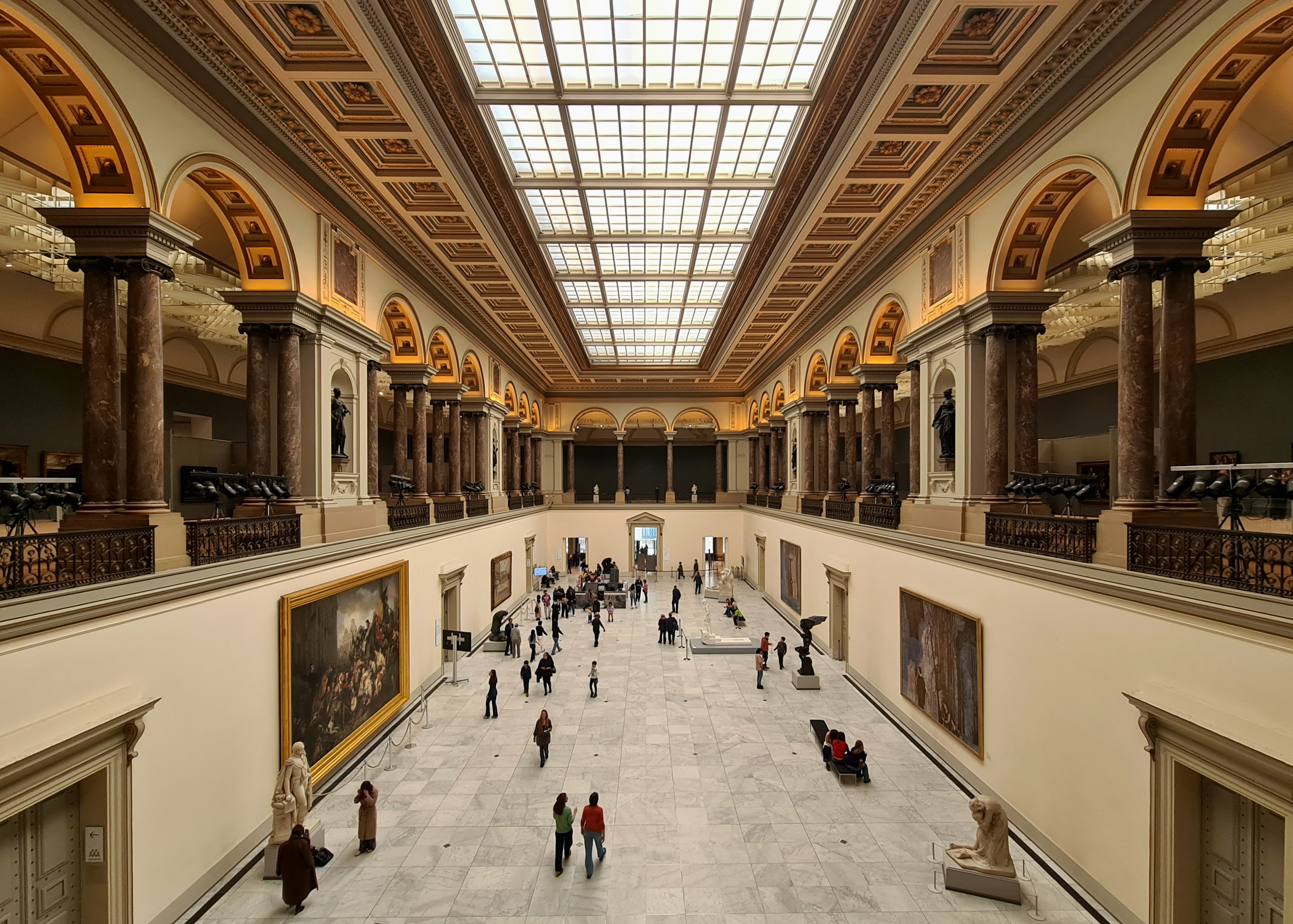
View from the upper floor of the main hall

Accessible via the Rue de la Régence, the vast rectangular main hall—formerly called the Sculpture Hall and currently the Forum—was designed as an interior courtyard overlooked by a colonnaded walkway and topped by a skylight. It features a series of paintings and sculptures, including one by Constantin Meunier and another by Guillaume Geefs. It also gives access to a café with a terrace, open in fine weather, overlooking the sculpture garden and offering a panoramic view. On each long side are two arched niches each housing an allegorical statue: Greek Art and Gothic Art by Charles Van der Stappen, Roman Art and Renaissance Art by Antoine van Rasbourg.

At the far end, in line with the central hall, is the Balat Staircase, consisting of four straight flights, covered by a vault supported by two groups of Ionic columns, and lit by a high arched window. A marble plaque in memory of Alphonse Balat, by Thomas Vinçotte, was affixed in 1902. In the annexe on the right—housing the Rubens Room in the centre—is the Royal Staircase: a two-flight staircase with a wrought iron banister, preceded by twin Doric columns, under a gilded coffered ceiling decorated with Leopold II's monogram.

Adjacent to the Balat Staircase is the modern extension (1962–1974) comprising a large auditorium, and on three levels, a complex of 53 exhibition rooms, documentary rooms, foyers and temporary exhibition space.

== In popular culture ==
In English-speaking countries, the museum is best known from W. H. Auden's poem Musée des Beaux Arts ("Museum of Fine Arts"), as it is now called. When Auden first published it in 1929, the poem was titled Palais des Beaux Arts ("Palace of Fine Arts"). At that time, "Palace of Fine Arts" was still commonly used as the name of the imposing 19th-century museum building. After World War II, Auden's various publishers switched to Musée des Beaux Arts as the poem's title. The poem describes, through the use of Bruegel's paintings—notably, Landscape with the Fall of Icarus—humankind's indifference to the suffering of others. It begins: "About suffering they were never wrong/The Old Masters...".

== See also ==
- List of museums in Brussels
- History of Brussels
- Culture of Belgium
- Belgium in the long nineteenth century
