= The Fall of Icarus =

Icarus is a character in Greek Mythology who fell to his death when the sun melted the wax holding together the wings he was using to fly.

The Fall of Icarus is a common subject in art, and may refer to:

- A mural by Pablo Picasso (1958) in the UNESCO headquarters, Paris
- An art installation by Peter Greenaway from 1986, with music by Michael Nyman.
- Landscape with the Fall of Icarus, a painting originally attributed to Pieter Bruegel the Elder
- "Landscape with the Fall of Icarus" (poem) by US poet William Carlos Williams

== See also ==
- Landscape with the Fall of Icarus (disambiguation)
