= Landscape with the Fall of Icarus (disambiguation) =

Landscape with the Fall of Icarus may refer to:

- Landscape with the Fall of Icarus, a painting attributed to Pieter Bruegel
- Landscape with the Fall of Icarus (de Momper), a painting by Joos de Momper
- Landscape with the Fall of Icarus (poem), a poem by William Carlos Williams written as a response to the Bruegel painting

== See also ==
- The Fall of Icarus (disambiguation)
