= The Fall of Icarus (Picasso) =

Mural by Pablo Picasso

- Artist: Pablo Picasso
- Year: 1958
- Medium: acrylic mural
- Dimensions: 910 cm × 1060 cm (360 in × 420 in)
- Location: UNESCO; Paris

The Fall of Icarus (originally titled The Forces of Life and the Spirit Triumphing over Evil or simply The UNESCO painting) is a 1958 mural by Pablo Picasso. Made of 40 painted mahogany tiles covering 90m^{2}, it is the artist's largest work. It was commissioned by UNESCO for the organisation's main foyer in Paris and was unveiled on 29 March 1958.

== Background ==
The mural was commissioned by UNESCO in 1957, with the purpose of decorating the Paris headquarters. Picasso was one of eleven artists who were chosen to undertake this task. Picasso began working on the commission in December 1957 and based his composition on his Bathers series from 1956. A scale model was completed on 29 January 1958, before the mural was finally presented two months later to Luther Evans, Director General of UNESCO and Georges Salles, the second President of the ICOM and Vice President of the Committee of art advisors. Originally the mural was titled The Forces of Life and Spirit Triumphing over Evil, but it was renamed by Georges Salles in 1958, who gave it the title The Fall of Icarus.

The mural was first publicly displayed in the hallway of UNESCO's Bâtiment des Conférences on 3 November 1958 when the building was inaugurated.

== Description ==
The mural is immense in size, measuring nearly 100 square metres and comprising 40 wooden panels painted in acrylic. It depicts a beach scene that features several figures. On the centre left, a figure is shown to be falling from the sky towards the blue ocean. The mural was produced in segments that divided the work into four sections. Picasso used abstract forms to portray the figures in the mural in a similar style to the Bathers.

== Interpretations ==
The image has been interpreted in various ways, such as a possible depiction of the struggle between good and evil. Picasso maintained that the mural is simply a scene of people bathing and also stated, "It is meaningless to look for things in paintings, what counts is finding things". Christopher E. M. Pearson remarked that the mural "vaguely echoes the mythological theme of the fall of Icarus" and that the indifference displayed by the surrounding figures towards the falling central figure makes reference to Landscape with the Fall of Icarus by Pieter Bruegel the Elder.

== See also ==
External videos
- Picasso unveiling the painting (1958), British Pathé

- The Fall of Icarus (disambiguation)
