= Musée des Beaux Arts (poem) =

Poem by W. H. Auden

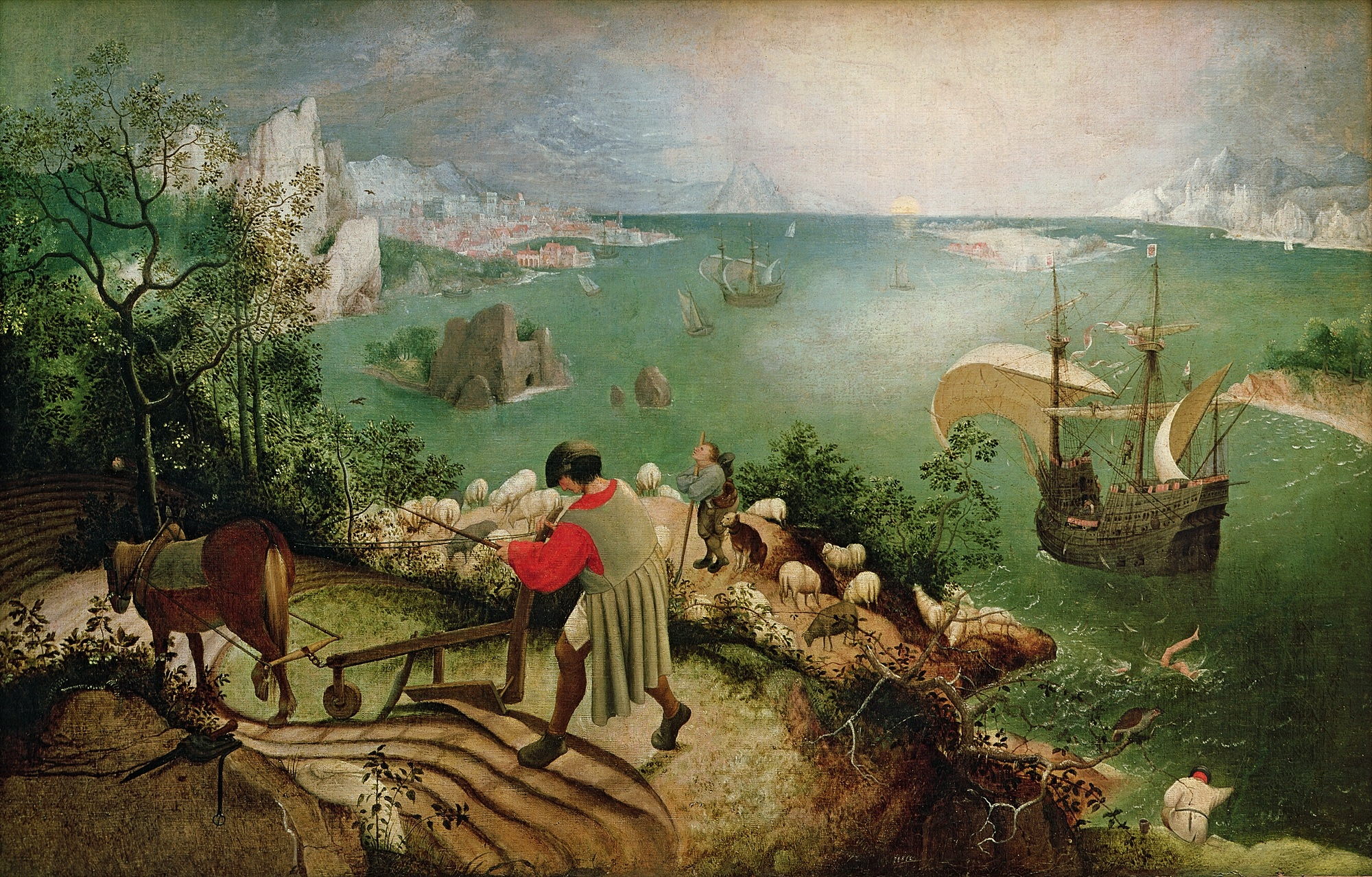
Landscape with the Fall of Icarus in what is now the Oldmasters Museum, Brussels. It is now usually regarded as an early copy of a painting by Pieter Bruegel the Elder.

"Musée des Beaux Arts" (French for "Museum of Fine Arts") is a 21-line poem written by W. H. Auden in December 1938 while he was staying in Brussels, Belgium, with Christopher Isherwood. It was first published under the title "Palais des beaux arts" (Palace of Fine Arts) in the Spring 1939 issue of New Writing, a modernist magazine edited by John Lehmann. It next appeared in the collected volume of verse Another Time (New York: Random House, 1940), which was followed four months later by the English edition (London: Faber and Faber, 1940).

The museum is famous for its collection of Early Netherlandish paintings. When Auden visited the museum he would have seen a number of the paintings of the "Old Masters" referred to in the second line of the poem, including the Landscape with the Fall of Icarus which at the time was still regarded as an original by Pieter Bruegel the Elder. The poem describes, through the use of Bruegel's paintings, humankind's indifference to the suffering of others.

The poem's changing titles come from the names used by the museum in Brussels containing the painting. When Auden first published it in 1929 this was "Palais des beaux arts" ("Palace of Fine Arts"), still commonly used as the name of the imposing 19th-century museum building. After World War II, Auden's various publishers switched to Musée des Beaux Arts as the title of the poem. Auden's poem begins: "About suffering they were never wrong/The Old Masters...". By the 2020s it had been renamed again to the Oldmasters Museum, officially expressed in the Belgian bilingual style as Musée Oldmasters Museum. The appropriation and reshaping of the English term Old Masters (oude meester in Dutch, vieux maître in French) was thought to work well in a Belgian context, and the museum's collection is rich in the Netherlandish paintings from before 1800 for which the term was coined.

== Synopsis ==
Auden's free verse poem is divided into two parts, the first of which describes scenes of "suffering" and "dreadful martyrdom" which rarely break into our quotidian routines: "While someone else is eating or opening a window or just walking dully / along." The second half of the poem refers, through the poetic device of ekphrasis, to the painting Landscape with the Fall of Icarus (c. 1560s), at the time thought to be by Bruegel, but now usually regarded as an early copy of a lost work. Auden's description allows us to visualize this specific moment and instance of the indifference of others to a distant individual's suffering, inconsequent to them, "how everything turns away / Quite leisurely from the disaster ... the white legs disappearing into the green." The disaster in question is the fall of Icarus, caused by his flying too close to the sun and melting his waxen wings.

Auden achieves much in the poem, not only with his long and irregular lines, rhythms, and vernacular phrasing ("dogs go on with their doggy life"), but also with this balance between what appear to be general examples "About suffering" and a specific example of a mythical boy's fall into the sea. Auden scholars and art historians have suggested that the first part of the poem also relies on at least two additional paintings by Bruegel which Auden would have seen in the same second-floor gallery of the museum. These identifications are based on a not quite exact, but nonetheless evocative, series of correspondences between details in the paintings and Auden's language. However, none show a "martyrdom" in the usual sense, suggesting that other works are also evoked. The Bruegels are presented below in the order in which they appear to relate to Auden's lines.

== Bruegel's influence ==
lines 3–8:

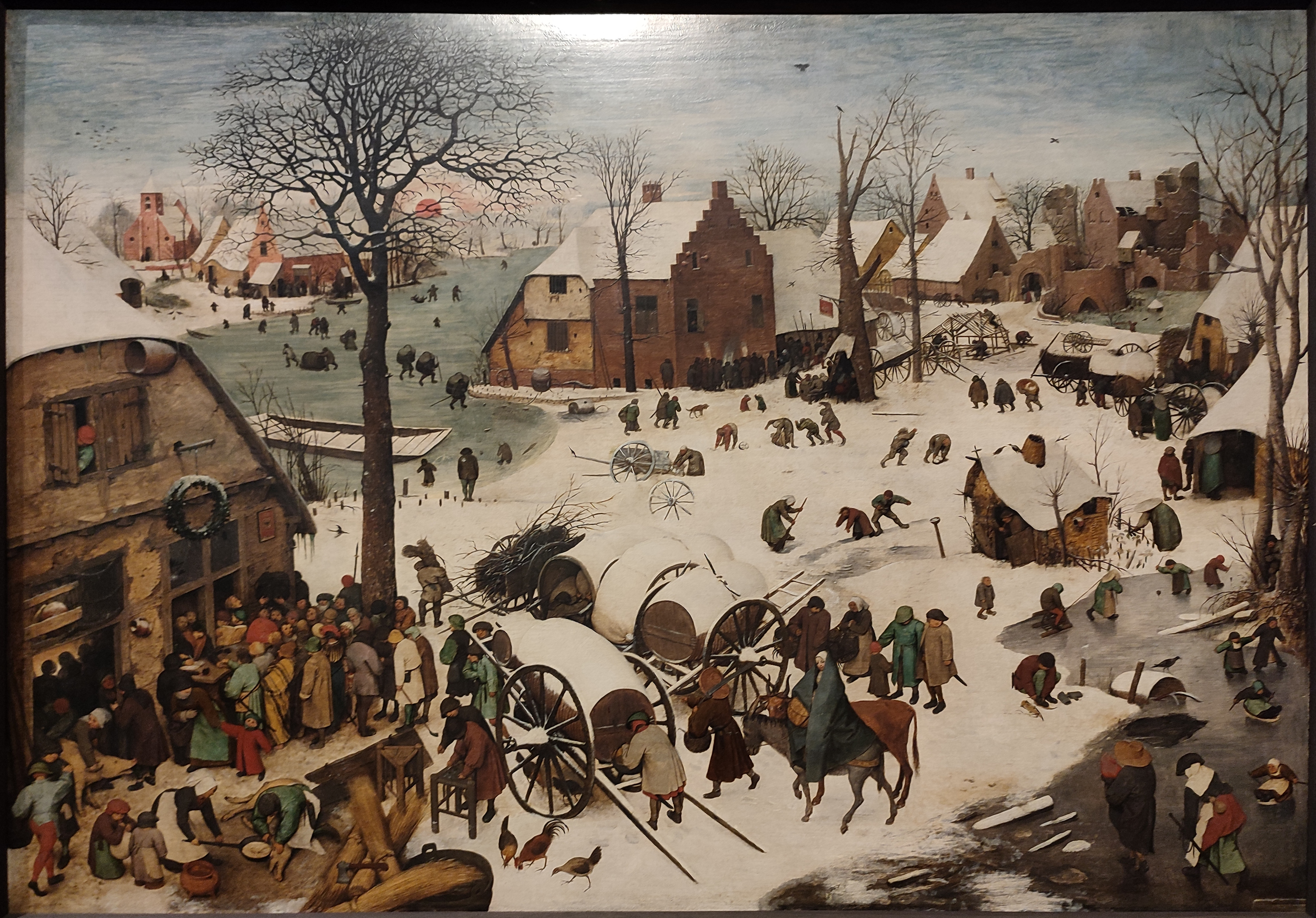
Bruegel,The Census at Bethlehem, 1566, in the same museum

Scott Horton noted that it would be a mistake to only look to the Icarus painting when explaining Auden's poem, for "The bulk of the poem is clearly about a different painting. In fact it is the museum's prize possession: Bruegel's The Census at Bethlehem of 1566, which was acquired by the museum in 1902." The painting depicts Mary and Joseph centre right, she on a donkey bundled up for the snow of Bruegel's Flanders, and he leading with a red hat and long carpenter's saw over his shoulder. They are surrounded by many other people: "someone else ... eating or opening a window or just walking dully / along." And there are children "On a pond at the edge of the wood" spinning tops and lacing on their skates.

lines 9–13:

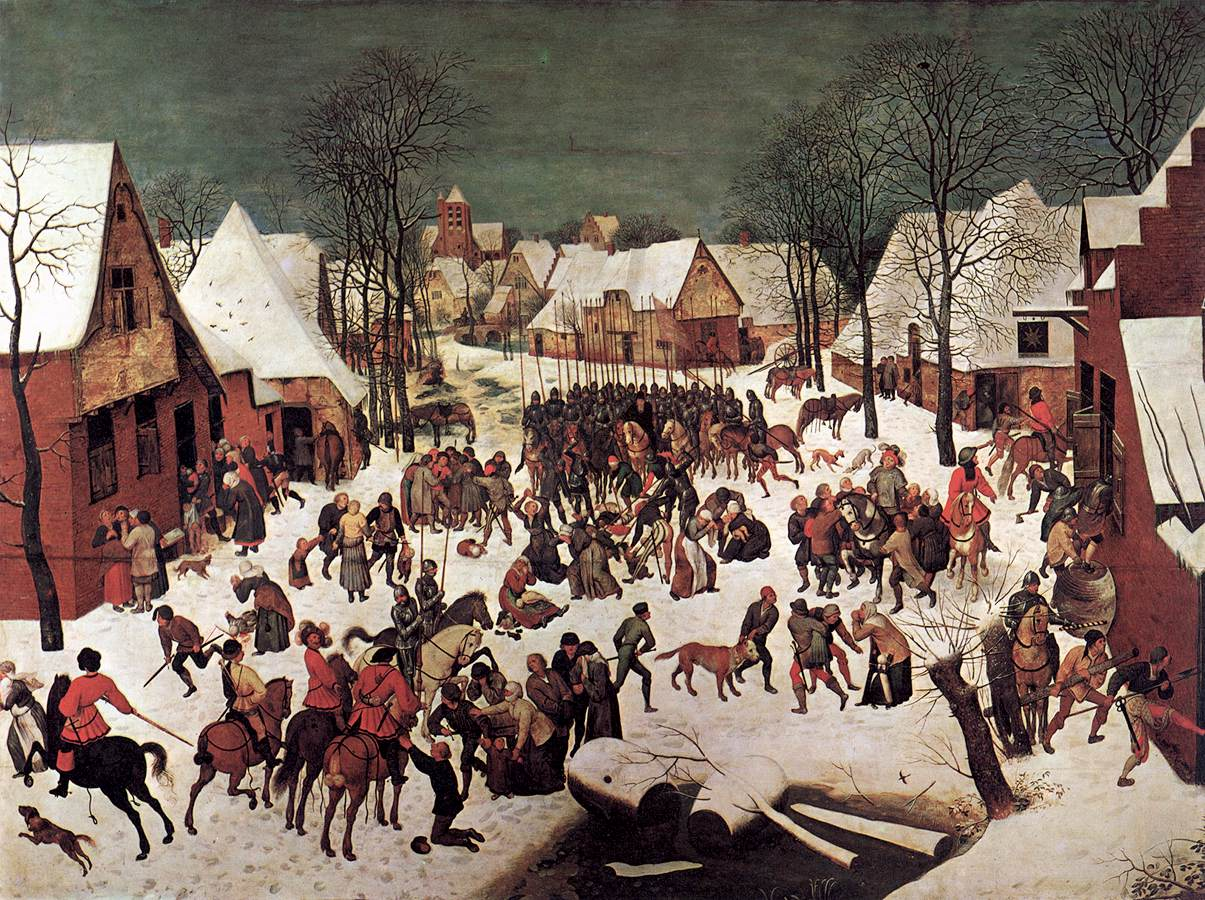
Bruegel, The Massacre of the Innocents, 1565–1567

The Massacre of the Innocents is a copy by Pieter Bruegel the Younger (1565–1636) of his father's original dated to 1565–7 (illustrated). The museum acquired it in 1830. The scene depicted, again in a wintry Flemish landscape, is recounted in Matthew 2:16–18: Herod the Great, when told that a king would be born to the Jews, ordered the Magi to alert him when the king was found. The Magi, warned by an angel, did not and so, "When Herod realized that he had been outwitted by the Magi, he was furious, and he gave orders to kill all the boys in Bethlehem and its vicinity who were two years old and under." In relation to the Census painting then we can see why the children of Auden's poem "did not specially want it [the miraculous birth] to happen."

Both this scene and the earlier are used by Bruegel to make a political comment on the Spanish Habsburg rulers of Flanders at the time (note the Habsburg coat of arms on the right front of the main building in the Census and the Spanish troops in red in The Massacre arresting peasants and knocking down doors). With respect to Auden's language we can see here "the dreadful martyrdom must run its course" (the innocent boys of Herod's wrath are traditionally considered the first of the Christian martyrs). We can see five of those dogs of Auden's poem going about their business and an approximation of "the torturer's horse / Scratches its innocent behind on a tree." Kinney says "Only one torturer's horse stands near a tree, however, and he is unable to rub against it because another soldier, with a battering ram, is standing between the horse and the tree ... Yet this must be the horse Auden has in mind, since it is the only torturer's horse in Bruegel's work, and the only painting with horses near trees."

lines 14–21:

Landscape with the Fall of Icarus was acquired in 1912. This is the only known example of Brueghel's use of a scene from mythology. He based his figures and landscape quite closely on the myth of Daedalus and his son Icarus as told by Ovid in his Metamorphoses 8, 183–235. The painting which Auden saw was thought until recently to be an original by Pieter Brueghel the Elder. Now it is believed to be based on a lost original of the artist. The painting portrays several men and a ship peacefully performing daily activities in a charming landscape. While this occurs, Icarus is visible in the bottom right hand corner of the picture, his legs splayed at absurd angles, drowning in the water. There is also a Flemish proverb (of the sort imaged in other works by Bruegel): "And the farmer continued to plough..." ("En de boer ... hij ploegde voort") pointing out the indifference of people to fellow men's suffering.

== Cultural legacy ==
Some years after Auden wrote this poem, William Carlos Williams wrote a poem titled "Landscape with the Fall of Icarus" about the same painting, and with a similar theme.

This poem and the painting Landscape with the Fall of Icarus appear side-by-side 22 minutes into the 1976 film, The Man Who Fell to Earth, starring David Bowie.

John Darnielle cited the poem as the inspiration behind the Mountain Goats song "The Last Day of Jimi Hendrix's Life".
