= Van Buuren Museum & Gardens =

Museum of European artworks from 15th to 20th century, in Brussels, Belgium

- Musée & Jardins van Buuren (French); Van Buuren Museum & Tuinen (Dutch)
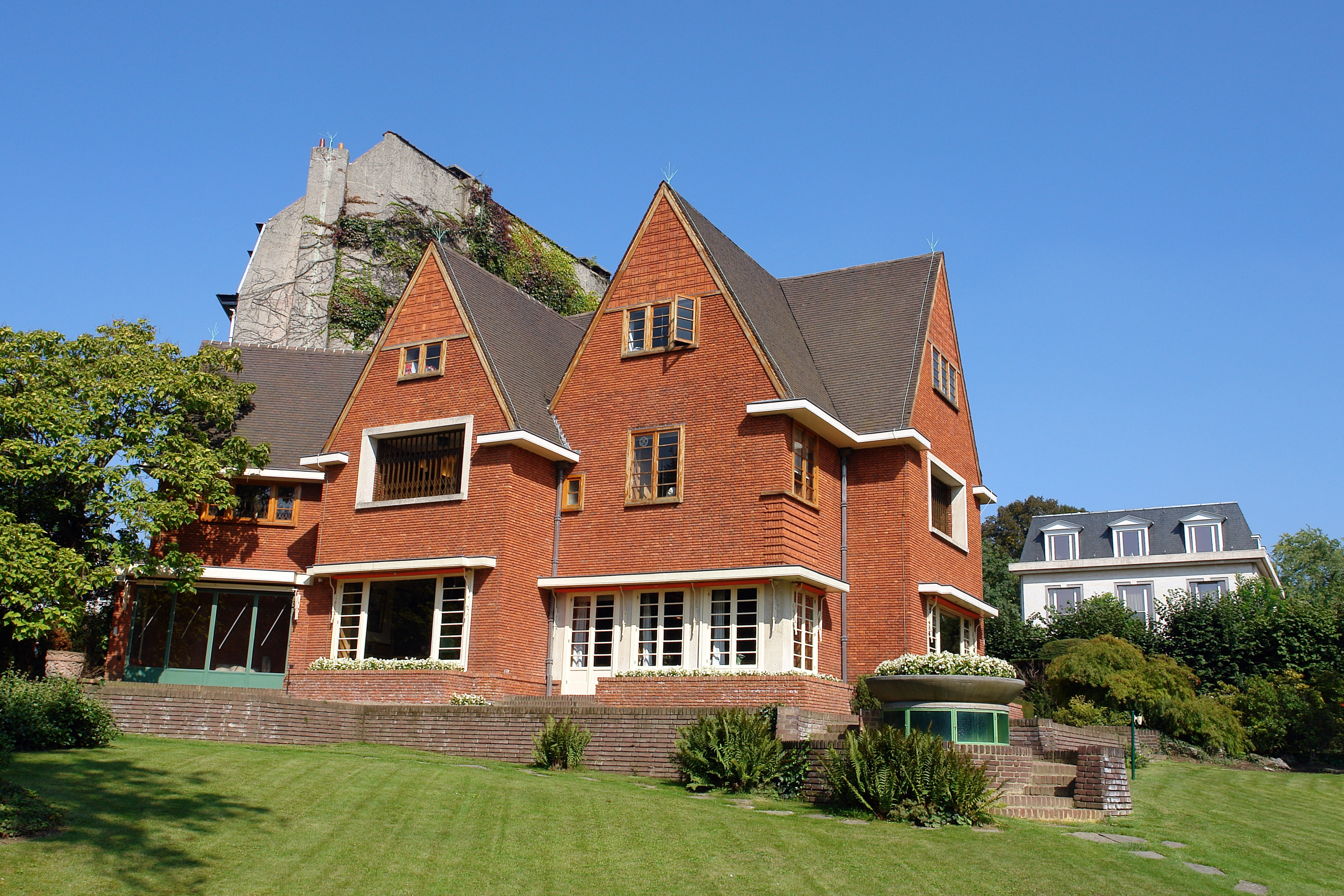
- View of the Van Buuren Museum from the garden
- Alternative names: Van Buuren House

General information
- Type: Private house
- Architectural style: Amsterdam School; Art Deco
- Location: Avenue Léo Errera / Léo Erreralaan 41, 1180 Uccle, Brussels-Capital Region, Belgium
- Coordinates: 50°48′36.18″N 4°21′13.73″E
- Construction started: 1924
- Completed: 1928
- Renovated: 2012, 2013
- Client: David and Alice Van Buuren
- Owner: David and Alice Van Buuren foundation

Website
- www.museumvanbuuren.be/en

The Van Buuren Museum & Gardens (French: Musée & Jardins van Buuren; Dutch: Van Buuren Museum & Tuinen) is a historic house museum and garden in Uccle, a municipality of Brussels, Belgium. Originally the private residence of the banker and art collector David Van Buuren and his wife, Alice Piette, the property showcases a unique blend of architecture, interior design, and landscape art.

Constructed between 1924 and 1928 in the Amsterdam School style, the house was conceived as a Gesamtkunstwerk ("total work of art") combining architecture, furnishings, and an extensive art collection spanning the 15th to the 20th centuries, in a richly decorated Art Deco interior. The surrounding gardens were designed by the landscape architects Jules Buyssens in 1924 and René Pechère in 1968–1970. Following Alice Van Buuren's wishes, the house was converted into a museum in 1975. It has been a protected heritage site since 2001.

The house is located at 41, avenue Léo Errera/Léo Erreralaan, a few steps from the Churchill Roundabout.

== History ==
David Van Buuren (1886–1955) was born into a Jewish family in Gouda, Netherlands. He settled in Brussels in 1909 to become an important private banker. He married the Belgian Alice Piette (1890–1973) in 1922. David Van Buuren asked his nephew and architect Johan Franco to start working on the plan for his future house in Brussels. From 1924 to 1928, the Van Buurens commissioned the architects Léon Govaerts and Alexis Van Vaerenbergh to build their house on the Avenue Léo Errera/Léo Erreralaan in Uccle, following Franco's sketches.

From 1928 to 1970, the Van Buurens hosted people such as Raoul Dufy, Jacques Prévert, René Lalique, Sergei Diaghilev, Erik Satie, René Magritte and David Ben-Gurion. The private house became a museum in 1975 according to Alice Van Buuren's testament. The complex was designated a historic site on 28 June 2001.

== House ==
Built in 1928 by Léon Emmanuel Govaerts and Alexis Van Vaerenbergh, the house features exterior architecture typical of the Amsterdam School, while the interior decoration constitutes a unique Art Deco ensemble created by Belgian, French and Dutch interior designers. The Van Buuren couple had turned their villa into a "living conservatory", where rare furniture, carpets, stained glass windows, sculptures and paintings by international masters remain in place, in the intimacy of a private "house of memory", which became a museum in 1975 under Alice Van Buuren's will, and which comprises a series of rooms that can be visited: the vestibule, the cloakroom, the hall and the staircase, the cozy corner, the music room, the black living room, the dining room, the study and the studio.

"This residence combines the warmth of a home—that of the banker and patron David Van Buuren and his wife—with the richness of a museum."

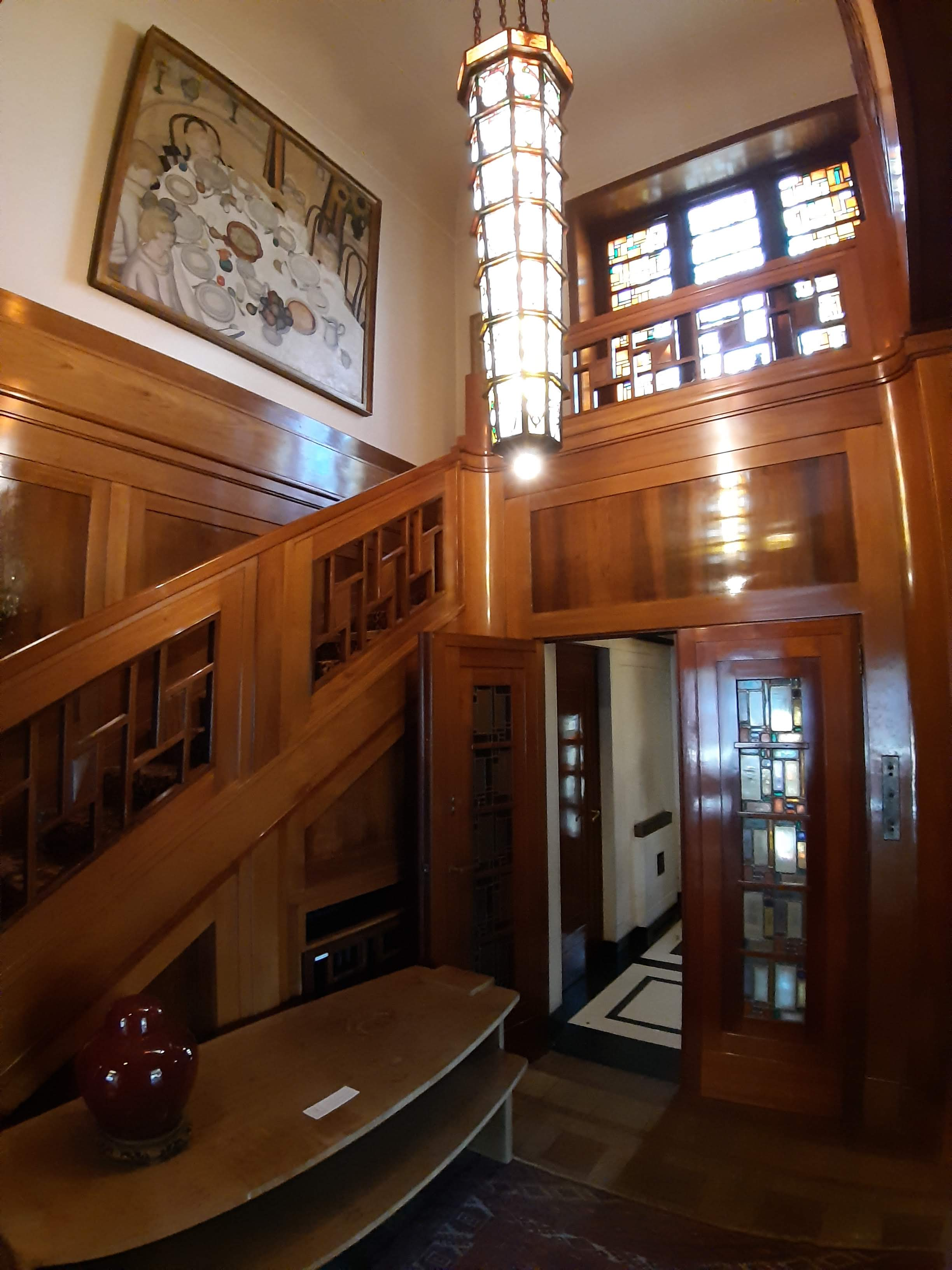
Hall and staircase

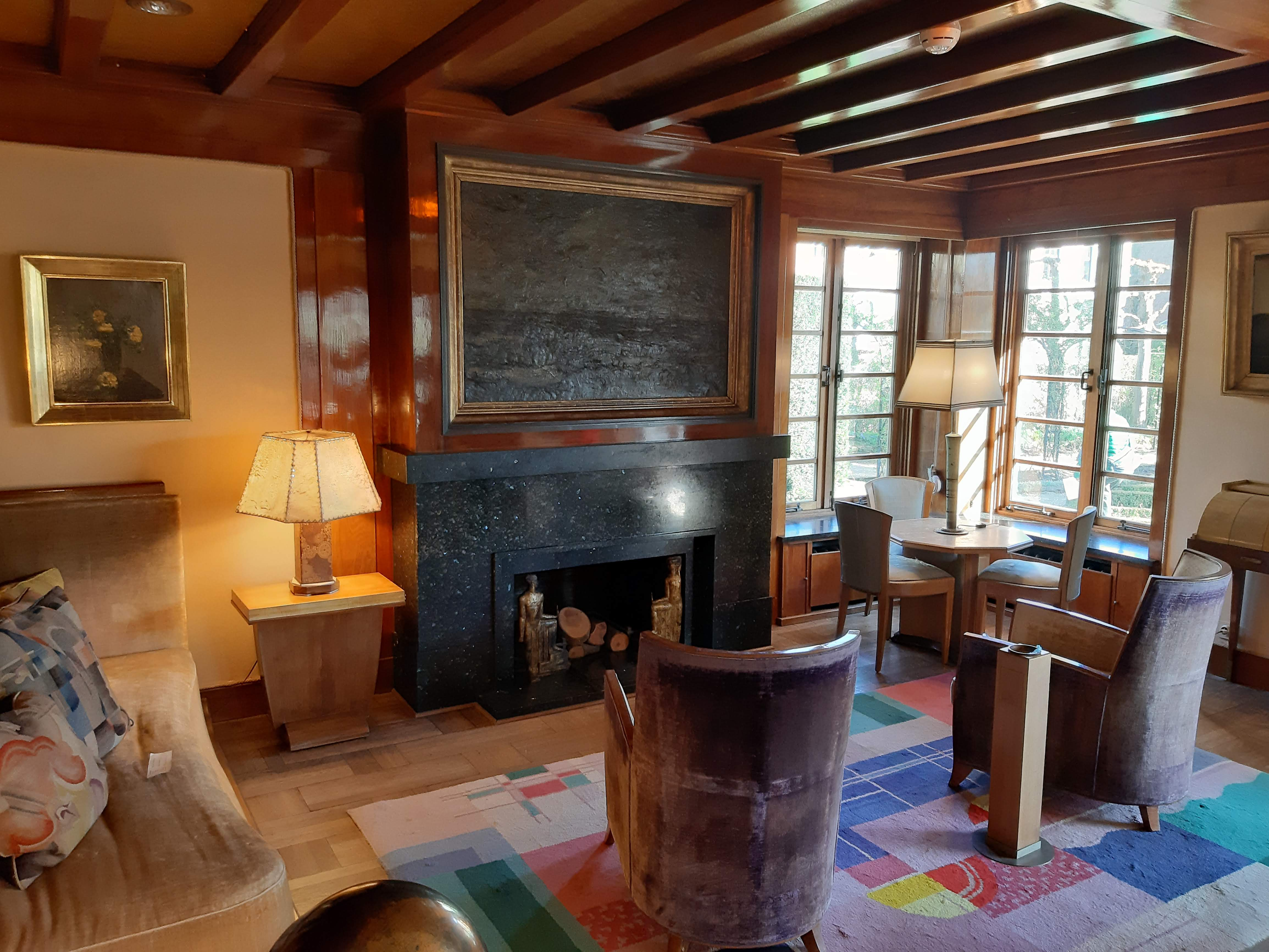
Living room

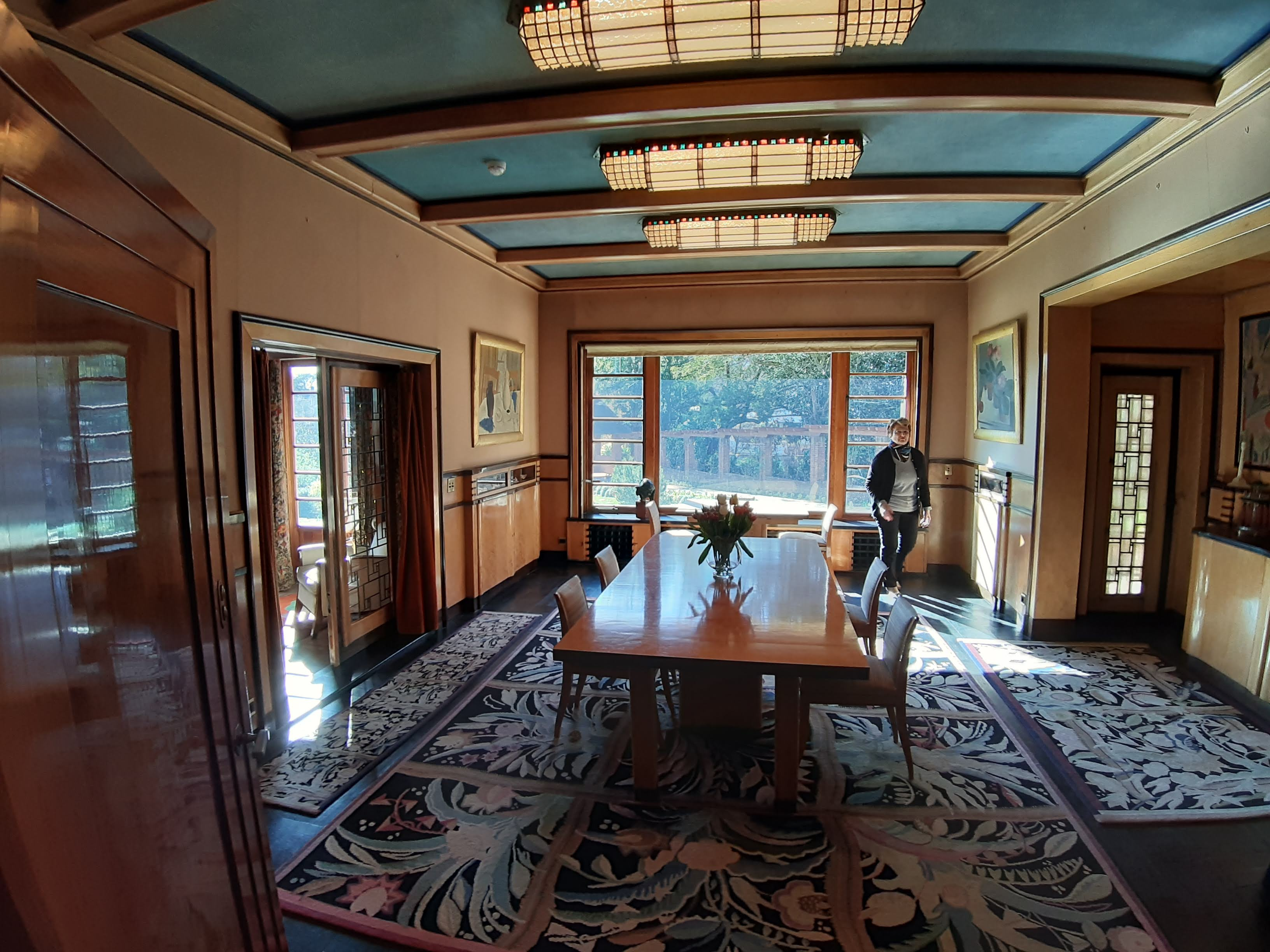
Dining room

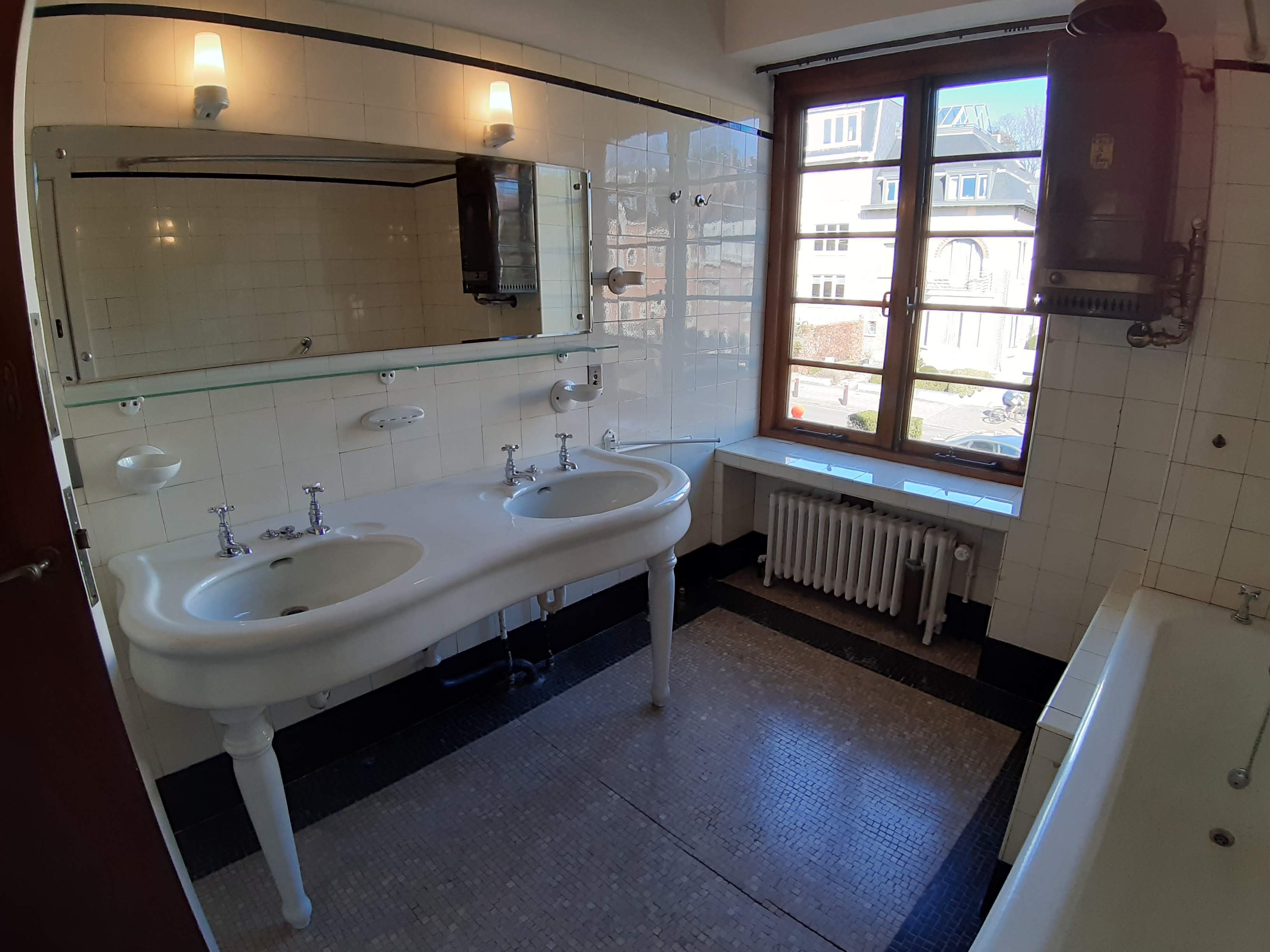
Bathroom

== Collection ==
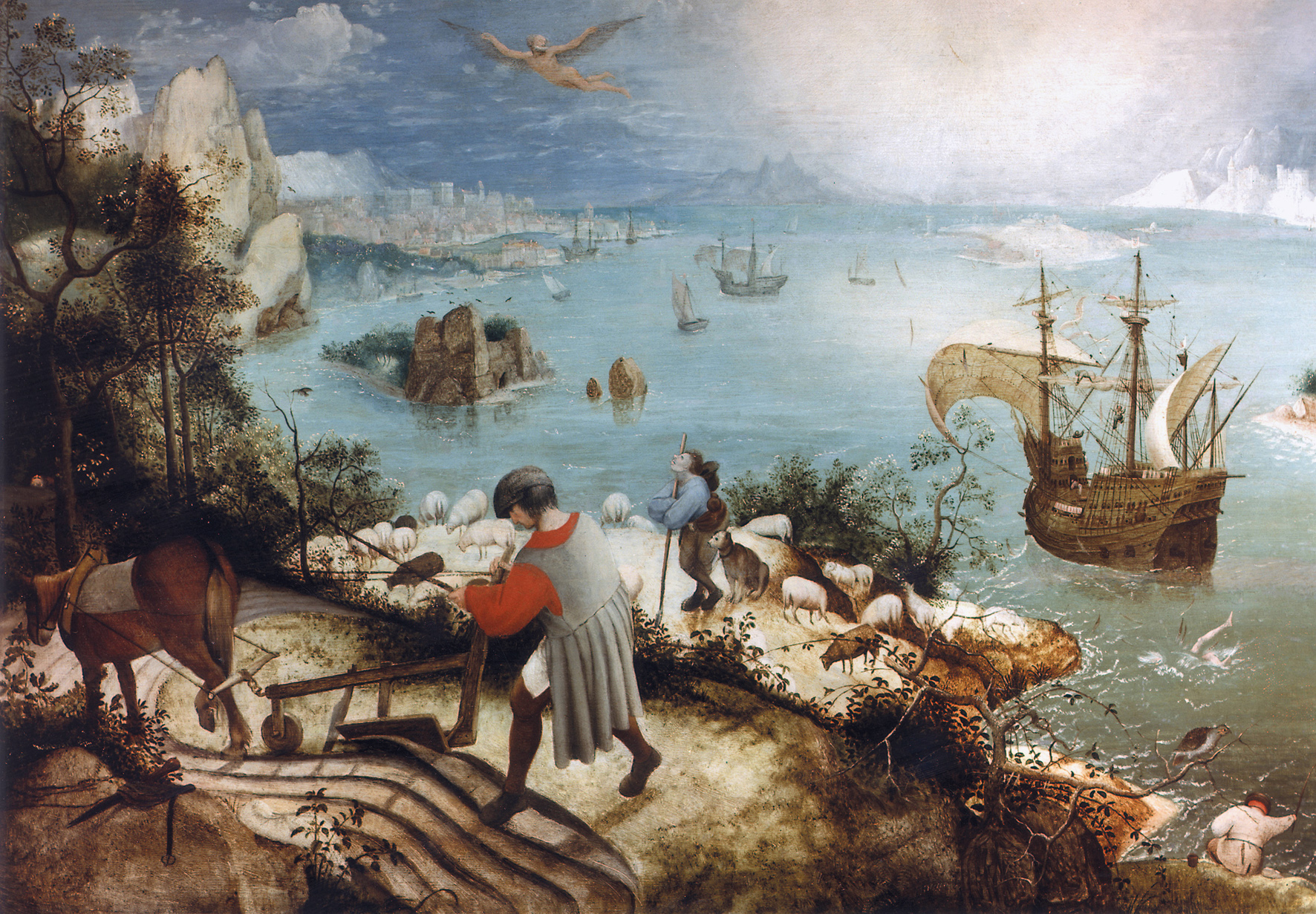
Landscape with the Fall of Icarus, circle of Peter Bruegel the Elder, c. 1590–1595

David Van Buuren decorated his house with paintings by James Ensor, Joachim Patinir, Pieter Bruegel the Elder, Hercules Seghers, Pieter Jansz Saenredam, Tsuguharu Foujita, Kees van Dongen, Vincent van Gogh, Henri Fantin-Latour, Rik Wouters, Gustave De Smet, Xavier Mellery, and Constant Permeke. David was the patron of the expressionist painter Gustave van de Woestijne, and the collection also consists of 32 of his paintings.

The living room is decorated with a rich collection of modernist carpets by the Dutch designer Jaap Gidding, and a grand piano made of rosewood designed by Julius Blüthner. Jan Eisenloeffel designed the 500 kg (1,100 lb) Art Deco chandelier in the entrance hall.

On 16 July 2013, the paintings Shrimps and Shells by James Ensor, The Thinker by Kees Van Dongen, as well as eight small works by Old Masters, were stolen.

== Gardens ==
The gardens, begun in 1924, originally covered 26 a (28,000 sq ft) and now cover 1.5 ha (3.7 acres). They are divided into three parts. The first, and oldest, is a Picturesque Garden by the landscape architect Jules Buyssens that recalls the spirit of the Roaring Twenties and shows the geometrical ideas of Art Deco. The second, the Labyrinth, is inspired by the Song of Solomon and in 1968 was decorated with seven sculptures by the sculptor André Willequet. The third, Garden of the Hearts, was designed by the landscape designer René Pechère in 1970 and brings a touch of romanticism to the park. There is a great harmony of style and time between the Buyssens garden and the Art Deco house. Alice considered René Pechère's gardens, added 45 years later, as a complement of her villa. The gardens can be visited year-round.

In 2015, the restoration of the gardens (carried out in stages in 2009–2012 and 2018–19) received the Europa Nostra Award for European cultural heritage. In 2023, they became the first Belgian site to be included in the European Route of Historic Gardens.

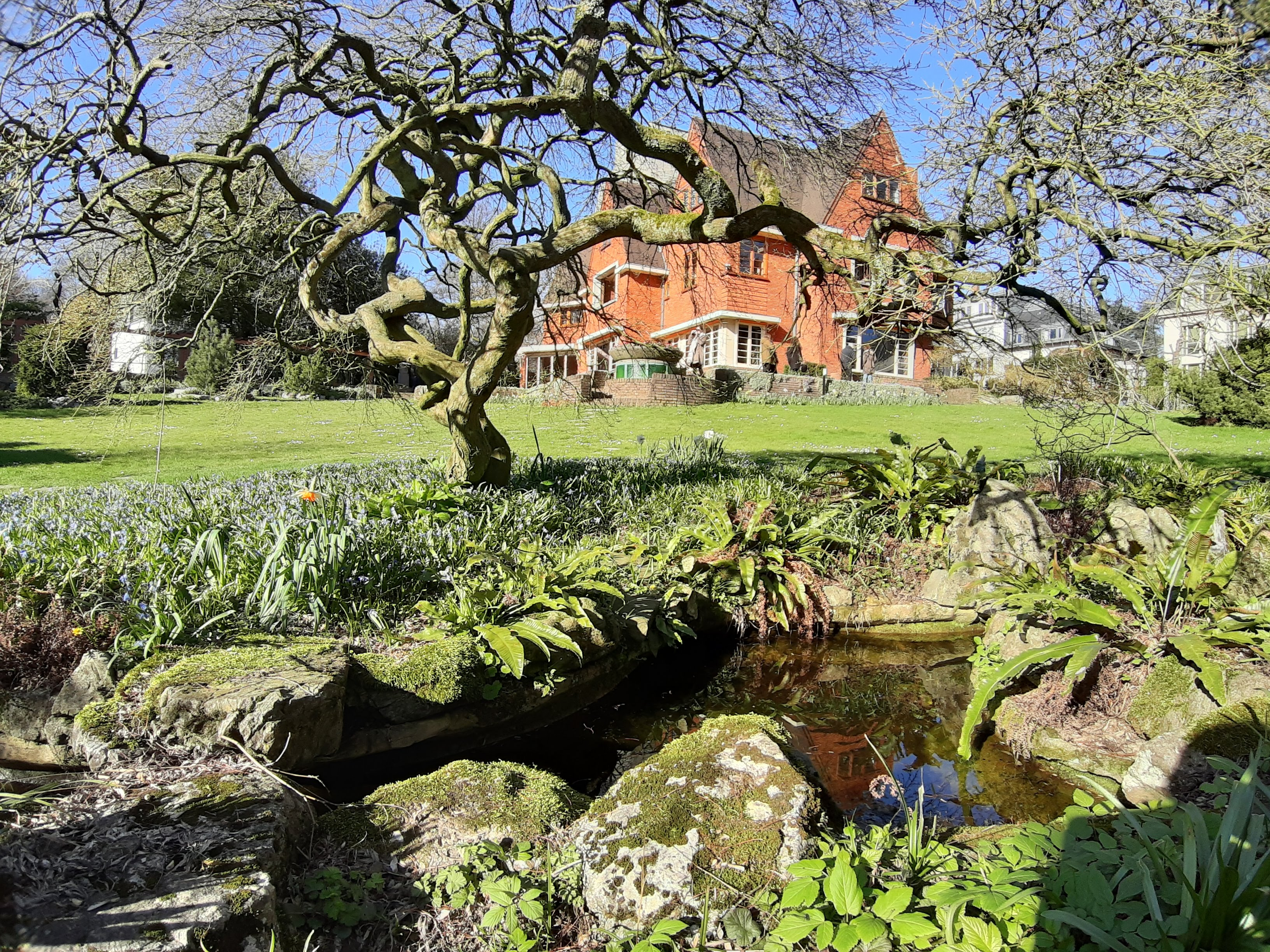
A view of the house through part of the restored garden

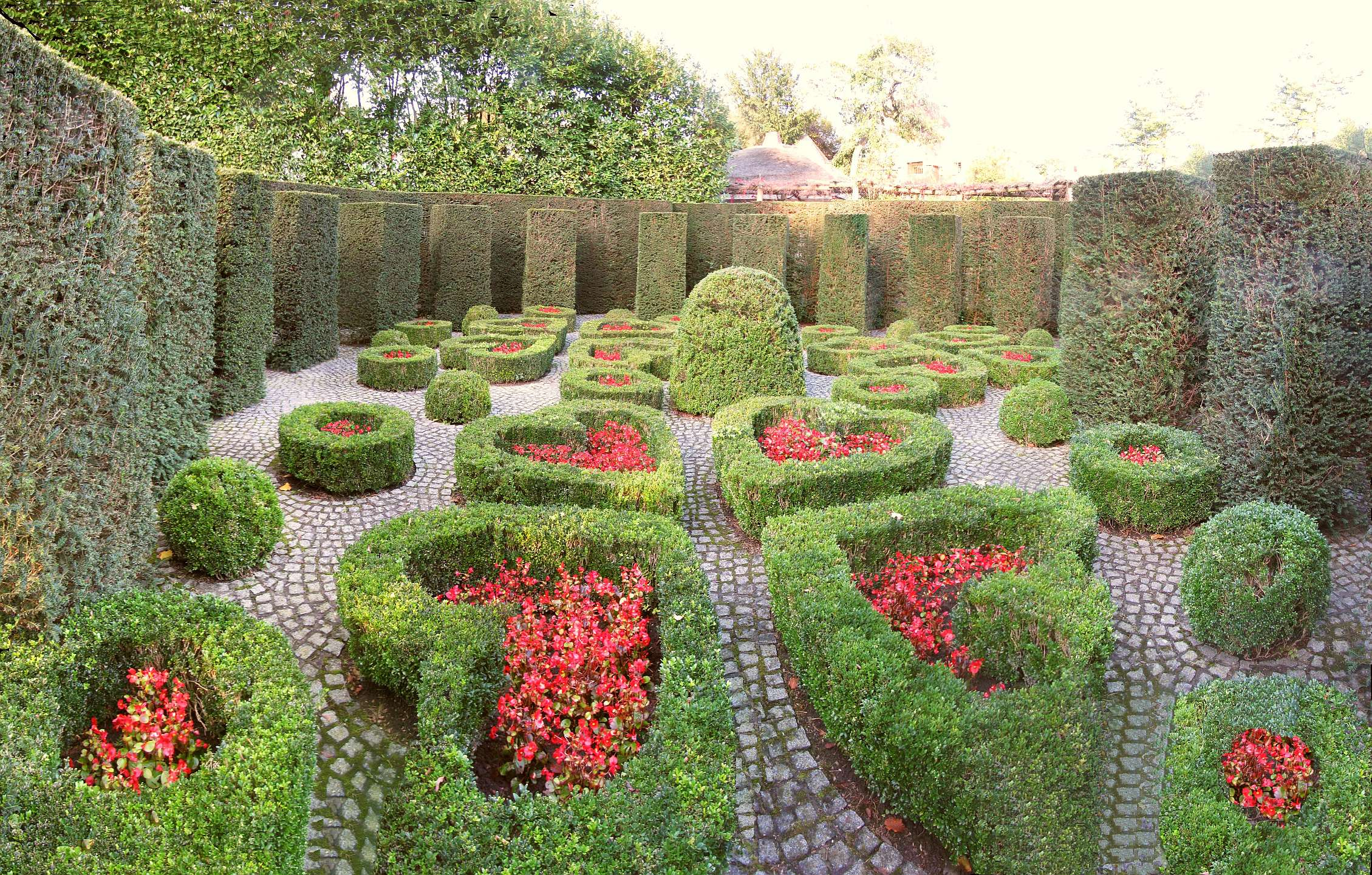
Garden of the Hearts by René Pechère

== See also ==
- List of museums in Brussels
- Art Deco in Brussels
- History of Brussels
- Culture of Belgium
