= Ekphrasis =

Describing visual art in words

Ekphrasis (from the Greek έκ and φρασις) is a rhetorical device defined as the written description of a work of art, either real or imagined. Since classical antiquity, ekphrasis has been used as a technique in poetry, but is frequently employed in other genres of literature as well. In addition to its descriptive qualities, in classical antiquity, ekphrasis was also used to evoke strong emotional responses in the reader, by using enargeia, or vivid language, and evidentia, or evidence, to prompt images in the reader's mind's eye. Ekphrastic writing also has scholarly value, and has recently become a common method in art history scholarship.

== History ==
=== Overview ===
Ekphrasis was used in classical antiquity as a storytelling technique, with authors describing artworks and other objects in such detail that the audience would be able to envision them in their mind. In the 18th and 19th centuries, because photography and other reproductions of artworks were scarce or non-existent, descriptions of artworks were in high demand. In this way, rather than describing imaginary art objects for storytelling purposes, ekphrasis was used as a way to extend the visual experience of looking at a work of art to the reading public. The demand for verbal descriptions of visual artworks also led to a rise in the popularity of art criticism. Art critics and scholars today still use descriptive analysis in their work, and sometimes employ ekphrasis as a methodology. Later on—and into the present day—literary ekphrasis became a creative tool, where writers use techniques such as the literal or figurative personification of artworks in ekphrastic passages for artistic effect.

=== Ekphrastic poetry ===
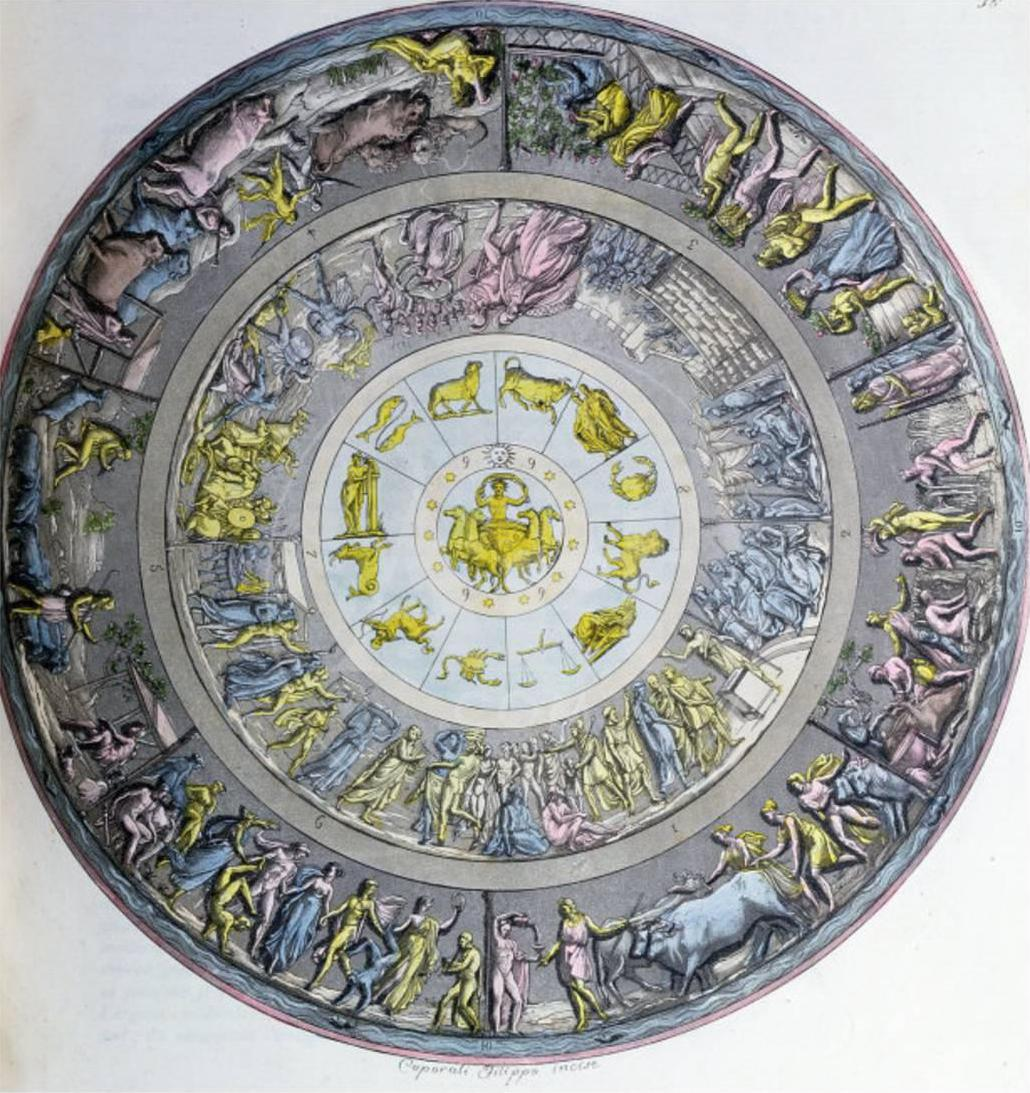
This is a design of the Shield of Achilles based on the description in the Iliad. It was completed by Angelo Monticelli c. 1820. This shield represents the art of ekphrastic poetry Homer used in his writings.

A commonly cited instance of ekphrasis comes from Homer's Iliad (Book 18), in which the speaker describes the Shield of Achilles. Later examples of ekphrastic poetry occur in Virgil's Aeneid, such as the description of the doors of the temple of Juno in Carthage, and Catullus 64, which contains an extended ekphrastic passage on an imaginary coverlet depicting the story of Ariadne.

Ekphrastic poetry flourished in the West during the Romantic era, and again among the pre-Raphaelite poets. John Keats's "Ode on a Grecian Urn" is another frequently cited example of ekphrasis. In the poem, the speaker muses on a piece of ancient pottery, likely an amphora, and the story depicted on it. Felicia Hemans made extensive use of ekphrasis, as did Letitia Elizabeth Landon, especially in her Poetical Sketches of Modern Pictures. Dante Gabriel Rossetti's "double-works" exemplify the use of the genre by an artist mutually to enhance his visual and literary art. Rossetti also ekphrasized a number of paintings by other artists, generally from the Italian Renaissance, such as Leonardo da Vinci's Virgin of the Rocks.

Other examples of the genre from the nineteenth century include Michael Field's 1892 volume Sight and Song, which contains only ekphrastic poetry; Algernon Charles Swinburne's poem "Before the Mirror", which ekphrasizes James Abbott McNeill Whistler's Symphony in White, No. 2: The Little White Girl, hinted at only by the poem's subtitle, "Verses Written under a Picture"; and Robert Browning's "My Last Duchess", which although a dramatic monologue, includes some description by the duke of the portrait before which he and the listener stand.

Twentieth-century examples of ekphrasis include Rainer Maria Rilke's "Archaic Torso of Apollo", and The Shield of Achilles (1952), a poem by W. H. Auden, which brings the tradition back to its start with an ironic retelling of the episode in Homer (see above), where Thetis finds very different scenes from those she expects. In contrast, Auden's earlier poem "Musée des Beaux Arts" describes a particular real and famous painting, Landscape with the Fall of Icarus, thought until recently to be by Pieter Brueghel the Elder, and now believed to be "after" him, which is also described in the poem by William Carlos Williams "Landscape with the Fall of Icarus". Poets writing today also use ekphrasis.

== Examples ==
=== Ancient Greek literature ===
==== The Iliad ====
The shield of Achilles is described by Homer in an example of ekphrastic poetry, used to depict events that have occurred in the past and events that will occur in the future. The shield contains images representative of the Cosmos and the inevitable fate of the city of Troy. The shield of Achilles features the following nine depictions:

1. The Earth, Sea, Sky, Moon and the Cosmos (484–89)
2. Two cities — one where a wedding and a trial are taking place, and one that is considered to be Troy, due to the battle occurring inside the city (509–40)
3. A field that is being ploughed (541–49)
4. The home of a King where the harvest is being reaped (550–60)
5. A vineyard that is being harvested (561–72)
6. A herd of cattle that is being attacked by two lions, while the Herdsman and his dogs try to scare the lions off the prize bull (573–86)
7. A sheep farm (587–89)
8. A scene with young men and women dancing (590–606)
9. The mighty Ocean as it encircles the shield (607–609)

==== The Odyssey ====
Although not written as elaborately as previous examples of ekphrastic poetry, from lines 609–614 the belt of Herakles is described as having "marvelous works," such as animals with piercing eyes and hogs in a grove of trees. It also contains multiple images of battles and occurrences of manslaughter. In the Odyssey, there is also a scene where Odysseus, disguised as a beggar, must prove to his wife, Penelope, that he has proof that Odysseus is still alive. She asks him about the clothes Odysseus was wearing during the time when the beggar claims he hosted Odysseus. Homer uses this opportunity to implement more ekphrastic imagery by describing the golden brooch of Odysseus, which depicts a hound strangling a fawn that it captured.

==== The Argonautica ====
The Cloak of Jason is another example of ekphrastic poetry. In the Argonautica, Jason's cloak has seven events embroidered into it:

1. The forging of Zeus' thunderbolts by the Cyclops (730–734)
2. The building of Thebes by the sons of Antiope (735–741)
3. Aphrodite with the shield of Ares (742–745)
4. The battle between Teleboans and the Sons of Electryon (746–751)
5. Pelops winning Hippodameia (752–758)
6. Apollo punishing Tityos (759–762)
7. Phrixus and the Ram (763–765)

=== Ancient Roman literature ===
==== The Aeneid ====
In Virgil's Aeneid, the mother of Aeneas convinces her husband to make a set of armor for her son. The shield of Aeneas is described in book eight, from lines 629–719. Several key moments in Roman history are depicted on the shield:

1. Romulus and Remus suckling the she-wolf (lines 630–634)
2. The capture of the Sabine Women (lines 635–641)
3. The death of Mettius Fufetius (lines 642–645)
4. The Siege of Rome by Porsena (lines 646–654)
5. The Gauls' attack on Rome (lines 655–662)
6. The Battle of Actium (lines 671–713)
7. The Peaceful City, with Augustus Caesar standing triumphant in the center (lines 714–723)

There is speculation as to why Virgil depicted certain events, while completely avoiding others such as Julius Caesar's conquest of Gaul. Virgil clearly outlined the shield chronologically, but scholars argue that the events on the shield are meant to reflect certain Roman values that would have been of high importance to the Roman people and to the Emperor. These values may include virtus, clementia, iustitia, and pietas, which were the values inscribed on a shield given to Augustus by the Senate.

Earlier in the epic, when Aeneas travels to Carthage, he sees the temple of the city, and on it are great works of art that are described by the poet using the ekphrastic style. Like the other occurrences of ekphrasis, these works of art describe multiple events. Out of these, there are eight images related to the Trojan War:

1. Depictions of Agamemnon and Menelaus, Priam and Achilles (459)
2. Greeks running from Trojan soldiers (468)
3. The sacking of the tents of Rhesus and the Thracians, and their deaths by Diomedes (468–472)
4. Troilus being thrown from his Chariot as he flees from Achilles (473–478)
5. The women of Troy in lamentation, praying to the gods to help them (479–482)
6. Achilles selling Hector's body (483–487)
7. Priam begging for the return of his son, with the Trojan commanders nearby (483–488)
8. Penthesilea the Amazon, and her fighters (489–493)

Another significant ekphrasis in the Aeneid appears on the baldric of Pallas (Aeneid X.495–505). The baldric is decorated with the murder of the sons of Aegyptus by their cousins, the Danaïds, a tale dramatized by Aeschylus. Pallas is killed by the warrior Turnus, who plunders and wears the baldric. At the climax of the poem, when Aeneas is on the point of sparing Turnus's life, the sight of the baldric changes the hero's mind. The significance of the ekphrasis is hotly debated.

==== The Metamorphoses ====
There are several examples of ekphrasis in the Metamorphoses. In one of these, Phaeton journeys to the temple of the sun to meet his father Phoebus. When Phaeton gazes upon the temple of the sun, he sees the following carvings:

1. The seas that circle the Earth, the surrounding lands, and the sky (8–9)
2. The gods of the sea and the Nymphs (10–19)
3. Scenes of men, beasts, and local gods (20–21)
4. Twelve figures of the Zodiac, six on each side of the door to the temple (22–23)

== In scholarship ==
=== In, or as, art history ===
As art history gained popularity as an academic subject in the 19th century, ekphrasis as formal analysis of objects was regarded as a vital component of the subject. Concurrently, art critics such as John Ruskin produced many ekphrastic descriptions of art with great literary as well as art historical merit. Today, ekphrasis is considered an important device in art history writing and methodology. Erwin Panofsky writes about the difficulty of describing a work of art and its sensory qualities in his well regarded essay "On the Relationship of Art History and Art Theory: Towards the Possibility of a Fundamental System of Concepts for a Science of Art." Art historian TJ Clark took a more experimental approach to ekphrasis in The Sight of Death: An Experiment in Art Writing (2008), using a diaristic style of writing to describe specific artworks. In media studies, too, WJT Mitchell, has theorized ekphrasis as a rhetorical and artistic tool used to reproduce social and political power dynamics.
