= Jules Buyssens =

Belgian landscape architect

Jules Buyssens (1872-1958) was a noted Belgian landscape architect. He served as head of the Brussels parks department, and was gardener-in-chief for the 1935 Belgian centennial exposition.

== Selected gardens ==
- Léonardsau Park, Obernai, France
- Picturesque Garden, Museum van Buuren, Brussels, Belgium
- Parc Arboretum du Manoir Aux Loups, Halluin, France
