= Icarus (2022 film) =

- Film poster
- Directed by: Carlo Vogele
- Written by: Isabelle Andrivet and Carlo Vogele
- Produced by: Nicolas Steil
- Production company: Iris Productions
- Release date: 30 March 2022
- Country: Luxembourg

Icarus (French: Icare) is a 2022 Luxembourgish animated fantasy drama film directed by Carlo Vogele, written by Isabelle Andrivet and Carlo Vogele. The film is animated in CG, with hand-drawn elements. Inspired by Greek mythology, it follows a young Icarus and his friendship with the strange-looking but gentle Minotaur.

== Plot ==
Icarus is a young boy living on Crete with his father, the sculptor and inventor Daedalus. One day they visit the palace, where Daedalus delivers a statue to Queen Pasiphae and receives instructions for a new project from King Minos. On the way back, Daedalus explains that Minos is at war with the kingdom of Athens, seeking vengeance ever since his beloved oldest son was murdered there two years ago.

The next day, while Daedalus draws a map of a labyrinth, he sends Icarus to deliver some thread to the self-absorbed Princess Ariane. While there, Icarus explores the palace and stumbles upon an abandoned and overgrown section, where a mysterious bull-headed boy greets him telepathically. Icarus learns that he is Pasiphae's son Asterion. Unbeknownst to Icarus, she was driven by divine influence to visit a glowing white bull, and turned to Daedalus for help; the birth of her son fractured her relationships with her husband and daughter.

While Minos and Daedalus oversee the construction of a massive underground project, Icarus returns daily to play with Asterion. He teaches him to walk upright, and witnesses Minos’s mistreatment of him and Pasiphae’s tender care. Time passes, and Asterion quickly grows up. Encouraged by Icarus, he finally stands up to Minos. However, Minos’s project has come to an end. Although Daedalus tries to distract him and Asterion warns him telepathically to stay away, Icarus still witnesses Asterion being thrown into the newly built Labyrinth while a crowd watches, calling him a monster. Minos gloats that having defeated Athens, he will claim a yearly human sacrifice to be thrown to Asterion in the Labyrinth. He builds the reputation of Asterion as his monstrous Minotaur. Icarus tries to sneak into the Labyrinth to see Asterion, but finds it impossible to navigate. He encounters Pasiphae, tormented by visions of the future, who tells him that this is fate and warns him away.

Years pass. Icarus, now sixteen, has lost faith in his father after seeing his role in imprisoning his best friend, and there is a wedge between father and son. Theseus, the demigod prince of Athens, arrives on Crete to challenge Minos and slay the Minotaur. Ariane is instantly infatuated. Icarus overhears her begging Daedalus for the plans to the Labyrinth so that she can help Theseus enter and fight the Minotaur. Daedalus refuses. Desperate to help Asterion, Icarus secretly offers to help Ariane if she’ll take him to Theseus. However, when he tries to steal the plans, Daedalus catches him and angrily burns the scrolls.

While talking with Ariane, Icarus has the idea to use thread to navigate the Labyrinth. They make a deal with Theseus, whom Icarus asks to help Asterion. While Icarus prepares a ship for their escape, Ariane holds one end of the thread and Theseus descends into the Labyrinth. In the dark, Theseus initially battles a gigantic Minotaur, but then finds himself facing the gentle and peaceful Asterion. Nevertheless, he stabs Asterion in the back.

Icarus is waiting on the docks when Ariane arrives with Theseus, who gleefully shows him a horn cut from Asterion’s head. Icarus stands frozen in shock and grief while they sail away. Minos awakens to find Ariane and Theseus gone; meanwhile, Pasiphae has killed herself by allowing venomous snakes to bite her. Icarus is arrested, but Daedalus defends him and Minos sends both of them into the Labyrinth. Father and son finally reconcile, with Daedalus comforting Icarus.

On an island, while Ariane sleeps next to him, Theseus flips a coin. She wakes to find that he has abandoned her, and walks into the sea in despair. Daedalus builds wings for himself and Icarus to escape the Labyrinth together. Icarus flies higher and higher towards the sun. As his wings start to fall apart, he sees a vision of Asterion, finally free. The two embrace before Icarus falls from the sky.

== Voice cast ==
English cast

- Albert Atack as child Icarus
- Isaac Rouse as teenaged Icarus
- Peter Russel as Daedalus
- Madeleine Smith as Ariane
- Mark Irons as Theseus
- Ella Leyers as Pasiphae
- Mark Irons as Minos
- Mark Irons as Asterion

== Production ==
Vogele, a veteran Pixar animator, released a concept trailer in 2017. One early script used a framing device of the Greek gods as reporters crafting a new version of the story. Vogele visited Crete for inspiration, and worked with Édouard Cour, creator of the graphic novel series Héraklès, to develop the visual style. The film's production took six years and it had its theatrical release in France in March 2022.

== Reception ==
Reception by film critics was positive. The film was praised for its blend of 3D and hand-colored sketches as well as its Vivaldi-esque music. Télérama compared it positively to the work of Michel Ocelot. It was selected as Luxembourg's "Best Foreign Film" submission for the 2023 Oscars.
