= Icarus =

Greek mythological figure

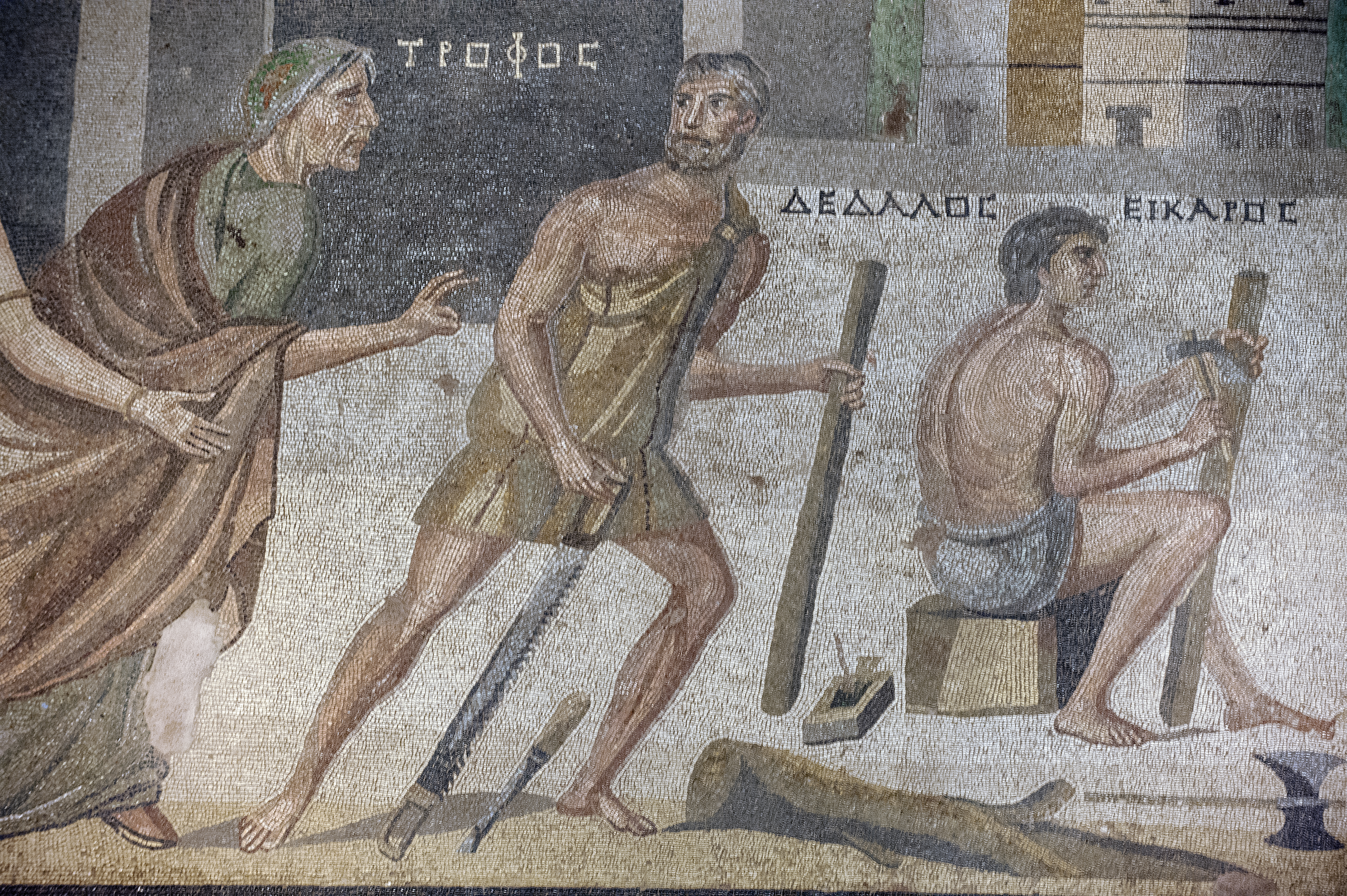
Icarus (right) with his father Daedalus on a Roman mosaic from Zeugma, now in the Zeugma Mosaic Museum.

In Greek mythology, Icarus (/ˈɪkərəs/; Ancient Greek: Ἴκαρος, romanized: Íkaros, pronounced [ǐːkaros]) was the son of the master craftsman Daedalus, the architect of the labyrinth of Crete, and his wife Naucrate. After Theseus, king of Athens and enemy of King Minos, escaped from the labyrinth, Minos suspected that Icarus and Daedalus had revealed the labyrinth's secrets and thus imprisoned the two, either in a large tower overlooking the ocean or in the labyrinth itself, depending upon the account.

Icarus and Daedalus escaped using wings Daedalus constructed from birds' molted feathers, threads from blankets, the leather straps from their sandals, and beeswax. Before escaping, Daedalus warned Icarus not to fly too low or the water would soak the feathers and not to fly too close to the Sun or the heat would melt the wax. Icarus ignored Daedalus' instructions not to fly too close to the Sun, causing the beeswax in his wings to melt. Icarus fell from the sky, plunged into the sea, and drowned. The myth gave rise to the idiom, "fly too close to the Sun". In some versions of the tale, Daedalus and Icarus escape by ship.

== The legend ==
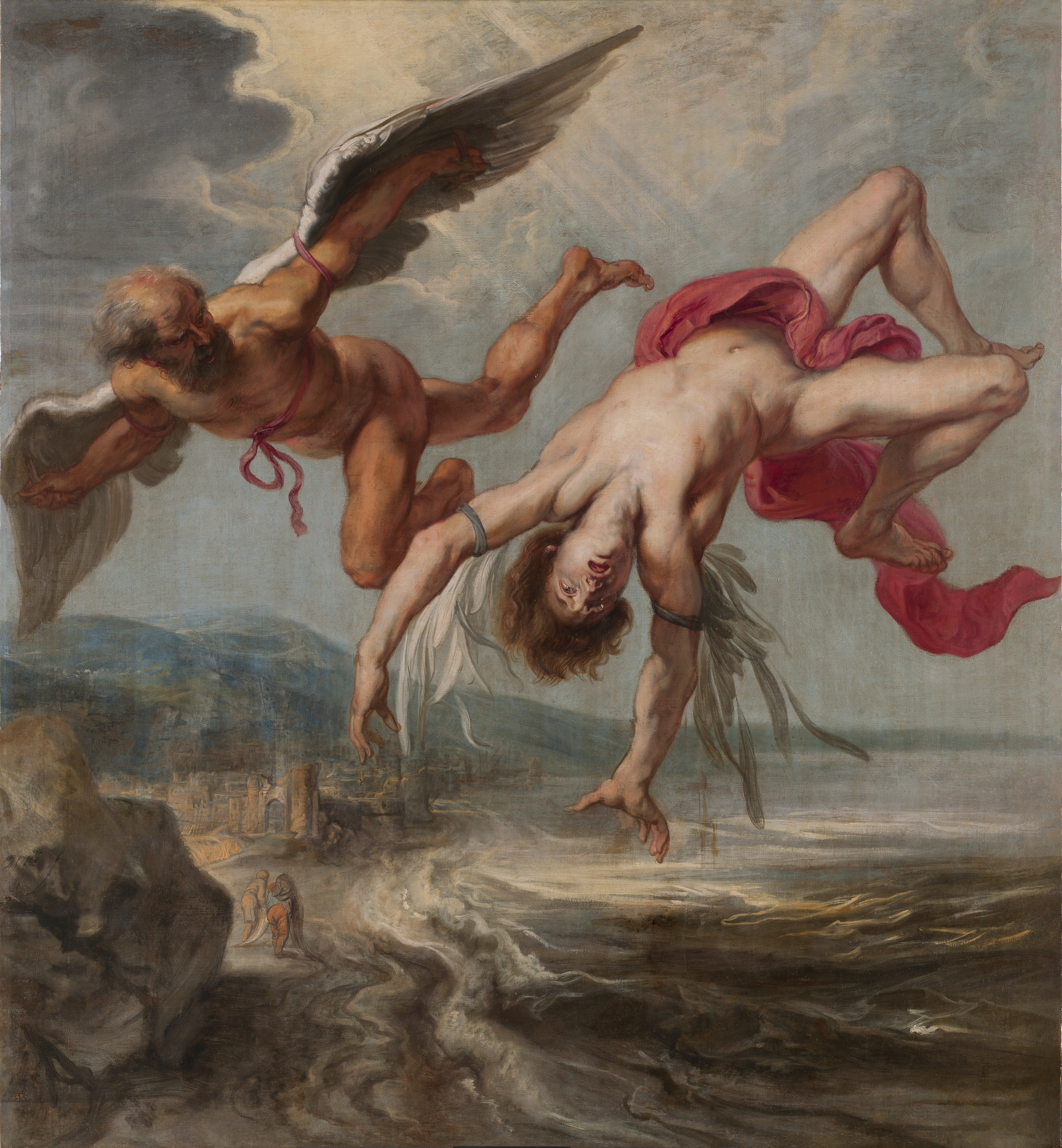
Jacob Peter Gowy's The Fall of Icarus (1635–1637)

Icarus's father Daedalus, a very talented Athenian craftsman, built a labyrinth for King Minos of Crete near his palace at Knossos to imprison the Minotaur, a half-man, half-bull monster born of his wife and the Cretan bull. Minos imprisoned Daedalus himself in the labyrinth because he believed Daedalus gave Minos's daughter, Ariadne, a clew (or ball of string) in order to help Theseus escape the labyrinth and defeat the Minotaur.

Daedalus fashioned two pairs of wings. One set for himself and the other for his son, made of feathers held to a leather frame by beeswax. Before trying to escape the island, he warned his son to follow his flight path and not fly too close to the Sun or the sea. Overcome by giddiness while flying, Icarus disobeyed his father and soared higher into the sky. Without warning, the heat from the Sun softened and melted the wax. Icarus could feel melted wax dripping down his arms. The feathers then fell one by one. Icarus kept flapping his "wings", trying to stay aloft. But he realized that he had no feathers left. He was only flapping his bare arms. He also saw loose feathers falling like snowflakes. Finally, he fell into the sea, sank to the bottom, and drowned. Daedalus wept for his son and called the nearest land Icaria (an island southwest of Samos) in the memory of him.

Today, the supposed site of his burial on the island bears his name, and the sea near Icaria in which he drowned is called the Icarian Sea. With much grief, Daedalus went to the temple of Apollo in Sicily, hung up his own wings as an offering, and promised to never attempt to fly again. According to scholia on Euripides, Icarus thought himself greater than Helios, the Sun himself, and the god punished him by directing his powerful rays at him, melting the beeswax. Afterwards, it was Helios who named the Icarian Sea after Icarus.

Hellenistic writers give euhemerising variants in which the escape from Crete was actually by boat, provided by Pasiphaë, for which Daedalus invented the first sails, to outstrip Minos's pursuing galleys, that Icarus fell overboard en route to Sicily and drowned, and that Heracles erected a tomb for him.

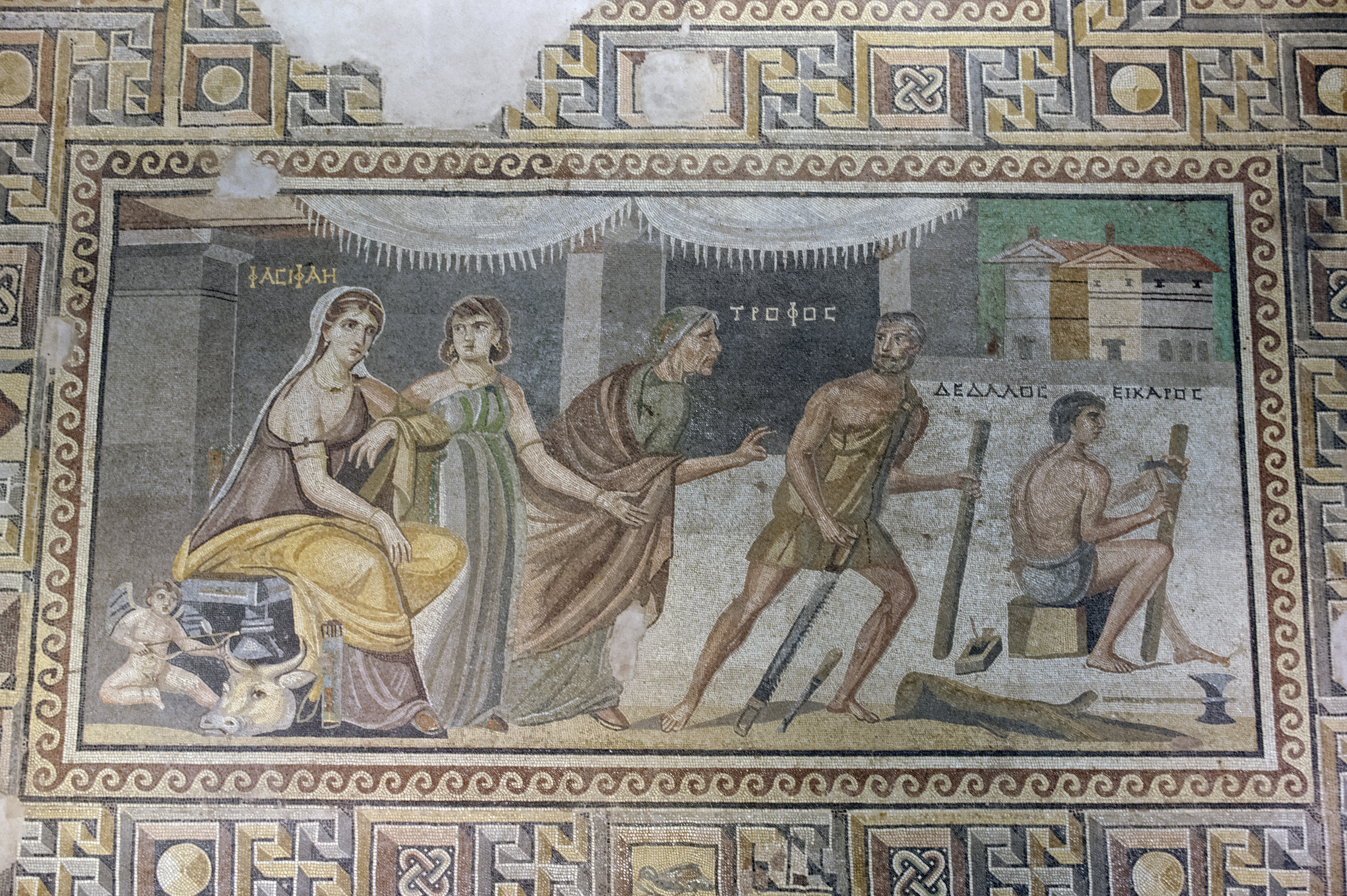
Daedalus, Icarus, Queen Pasiphaë, and two of her attendants in a Roman mosaic from Zeugma, Commagene

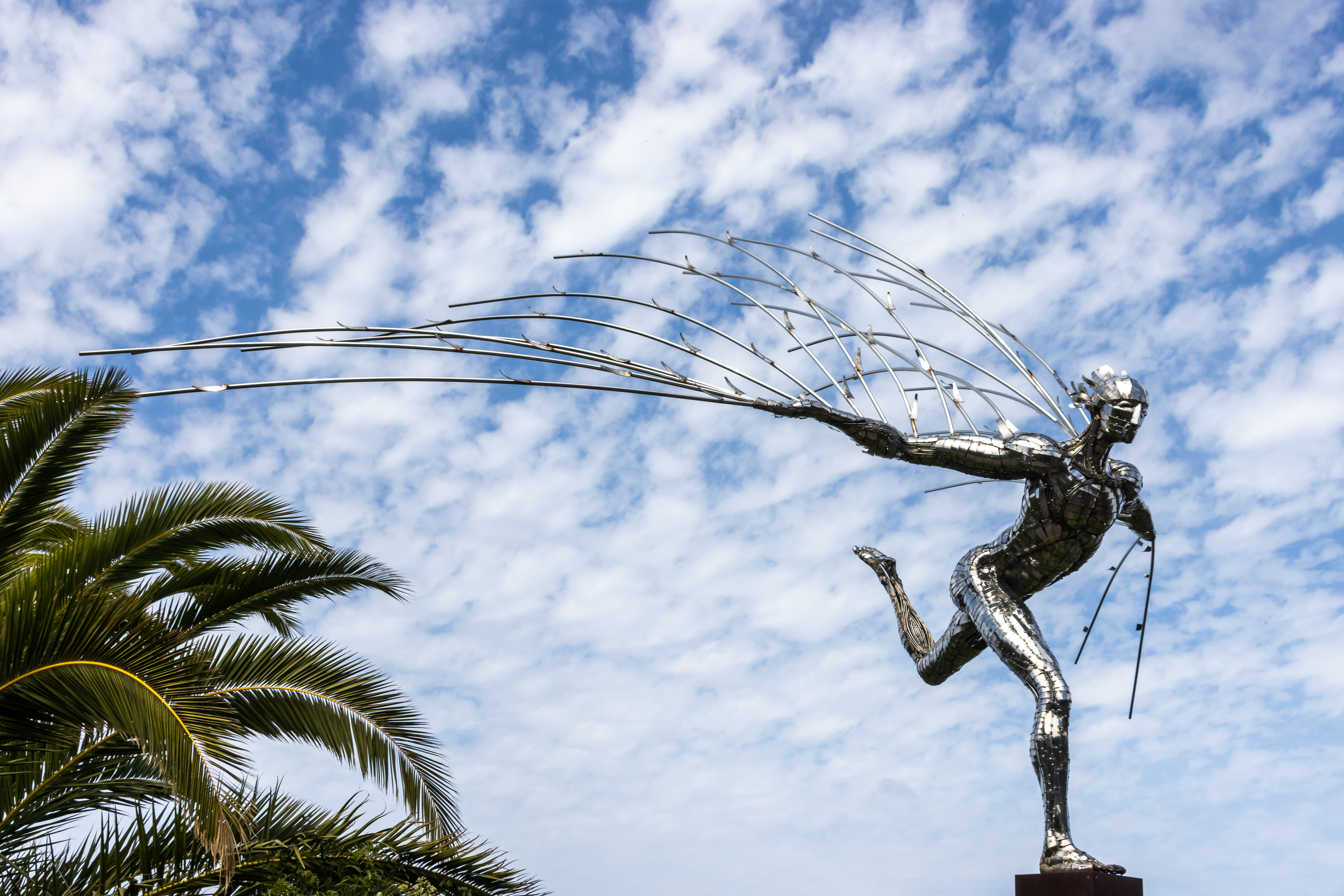
Ícaro Salvado (Icarus Saved), work of Julio Nieto. La Matanza de Acentejo. Tenerife, Spain

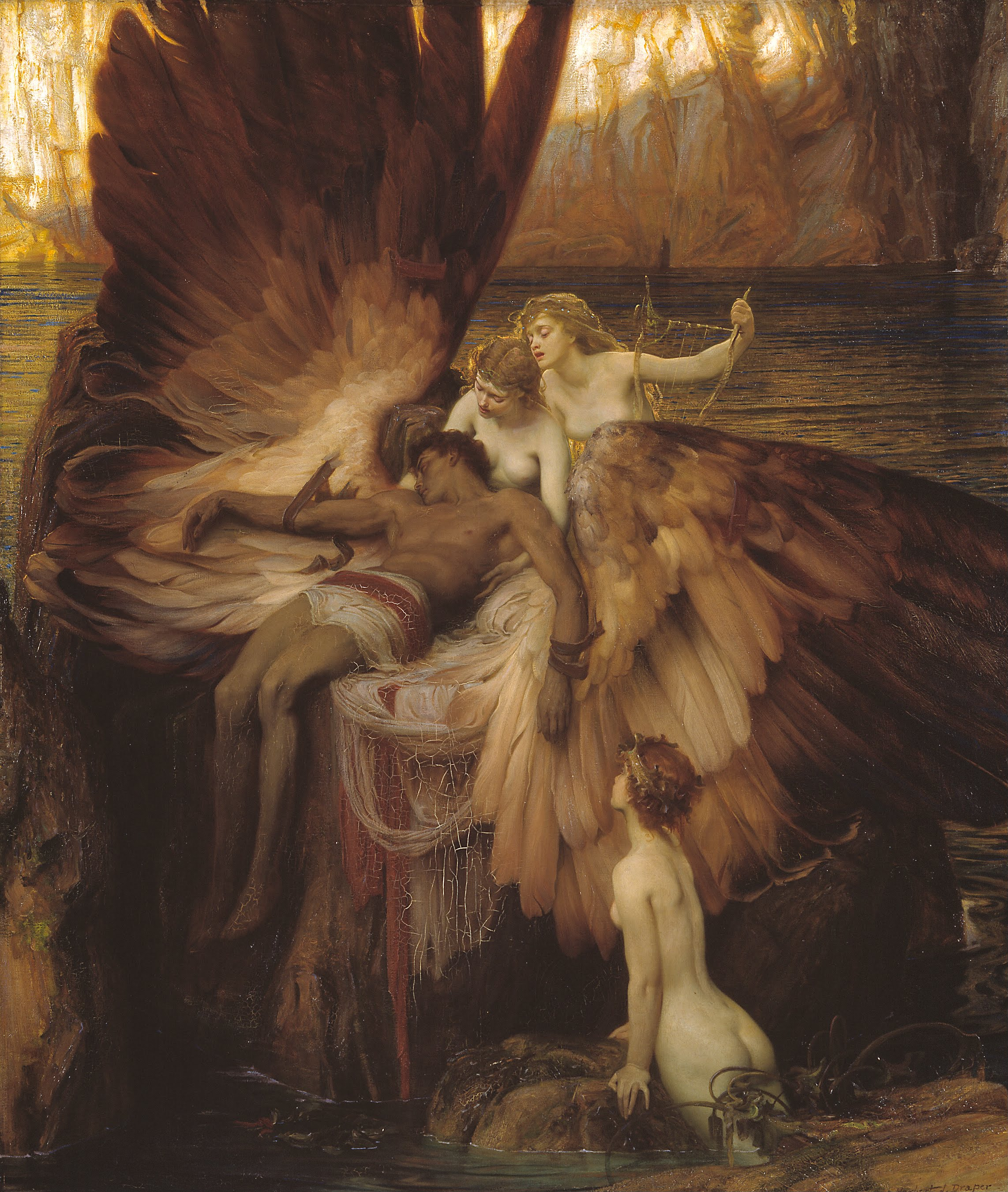
The Lament for Icarus (1898) by H. J. Draper

== Classical literature ==
Accounts of Icarus's story are found in Pseudo-Apollodorus's Bibliotheca (Epitome i.12–13); Diodorus Siculus's Bibliotheca historica (4.77.5–9); Hyginus's Fabulae (40); Virgil's Aeneid (vi.14–33); and Ovid's Metamorphoses (viii.183–235). A number of other ancient writers allude to the story in passing, notably Lucian.

The account by Pseudo-Apollodorus is brief. Ovid's account in the Metamorphoses is among the lengthiest, and the Latin poet refers to Icarus's myth elsewhere. Hyginus, among the Augustan writers who wrote about it in Latin in his Fabulae, tells of the bovine love affair of Pasiphaë, daughter of the Sun, that resulted in the birth of the Minotaur.

== Medieval, Renaissance, and modern literature and arts ==
Ovid's version of the Icarus myth and its connection to Phaethon influenced the mythological tradition in English literature reflected in the writings of Chaucer, Marlowe, Shakespeare, Milton, and Joyce.

In Renaissance iconography, the significance of Icarus depended on context: in the Orion Fountain at Messina, he is one of many figures associated with water; but he is also shown on the Bankruptcy Court of the Amsterdam Town Hall – where he symbolizes high-flying ambition. The 16th-century painting Landscape with the Fall of Icarus,) attributed to Pieter Bruegel the Elder, was the inspiration for two of the 20th century's most notable ekphrastic English-language poems, "Musée des Beaux Arts" by W. H. Auden and "Landscape with the Fall of Icarus" by William Carlos Williams. Other English-language poems referring to the Icarus myth are "To a Friend Whose Work Has Come to Triumph" by Anne Sexton; "Icarus" by John Updike; "Icarus Again" by Alan Devenish; "Mrs Icarus" by Carol Ann Duffy; "Failing and Flying" by Jack Gilbert; "It Should Have Been Winter" by Nancy Chen Long; "Up like Icarus" by Mark Antony Owen; "Age 10, 3am" by Sheri Wright; and "Yesterday's Myth" by Jennifer Chang. The myth is also a major subtext throughout Hiromi Yoshida's Icarus poetry books, while Icarus is a metaphor for troubled modern young men in the Norwegian Axel Jensen's novel Icarus: A Young Man in Sahara (1957). He is also the subject of the 2017 novel, Icarus, by Adam Wing. According to the New York Times Book Review, the hero of Andrew Boryga’s "Victim" is an "inner-city Icarus" who exaggerates his victimization narrative until it implodes. Icarus is the central character of a 2022 animated film by the same name, which reimagines the myth to give him a childhood friendship with the Minotaur. Igor Markevitch's 1932 musical composition L'envol d'Icare was intended as the score for a danced version of the Icarus story.

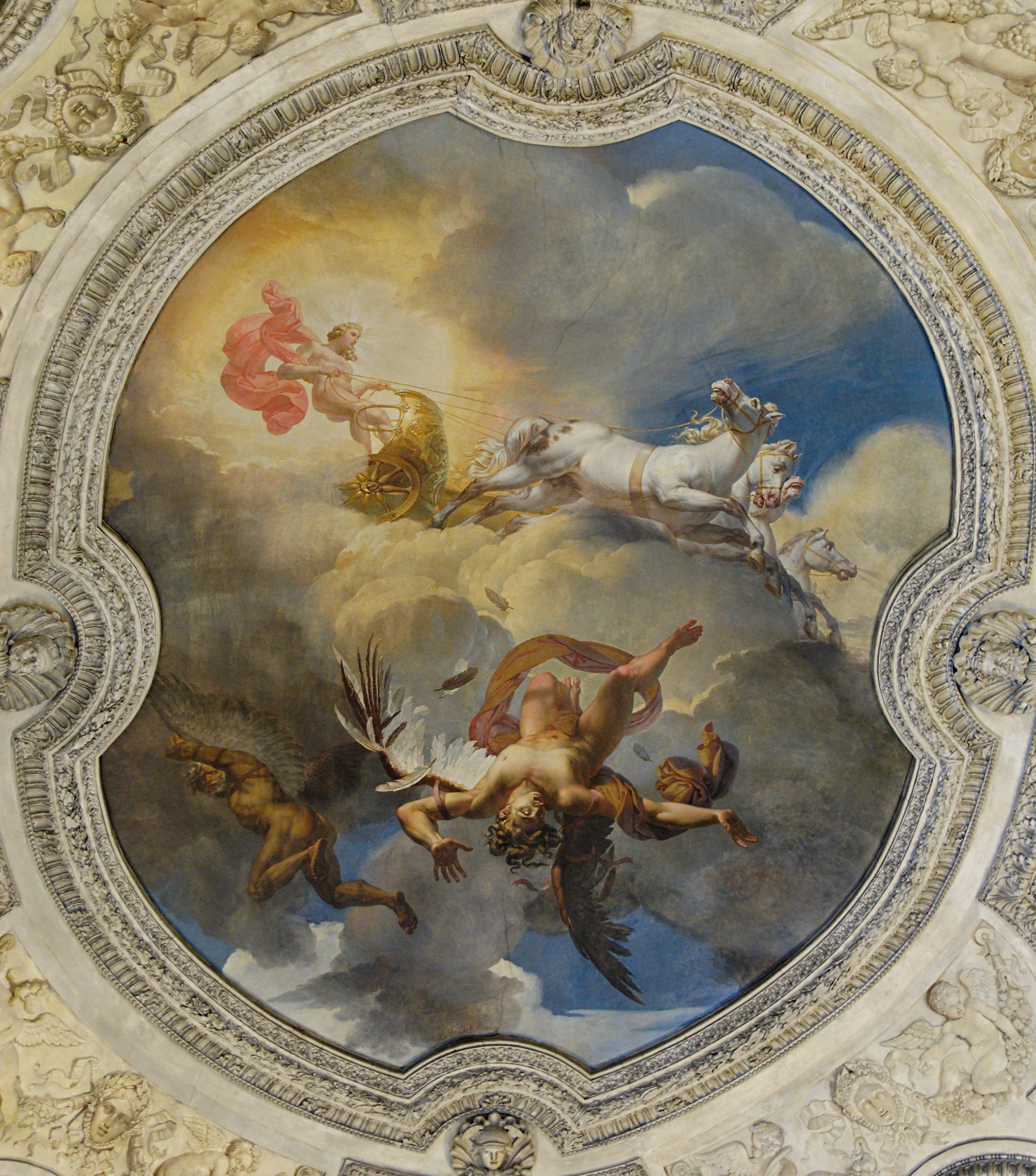
The Sun, or the Fall of Icarus (1819) by Merry-Joseph Blondel, in the Rotunda of Apollo at the Louvre

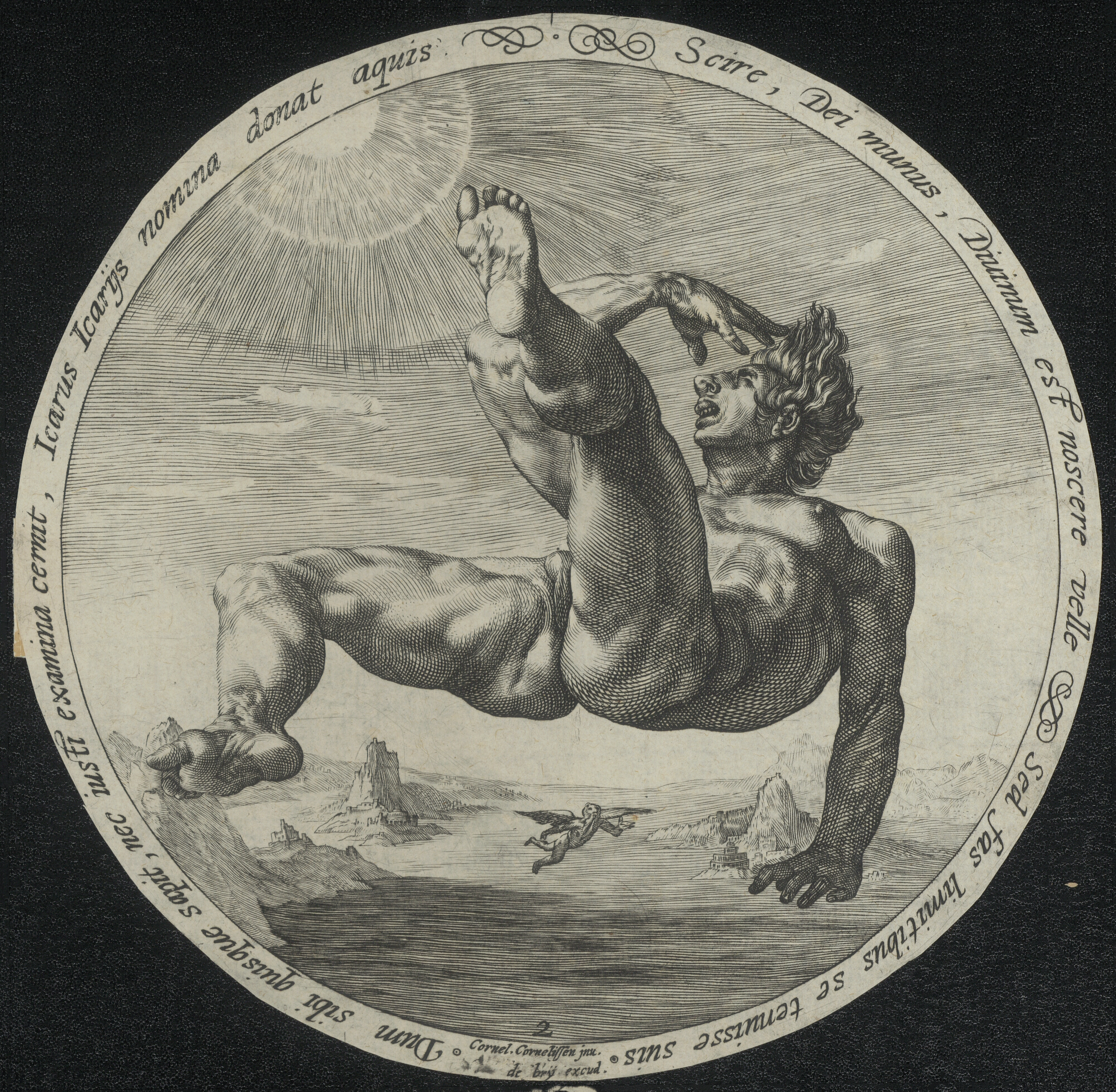
A 16th century print of Icarus falling.

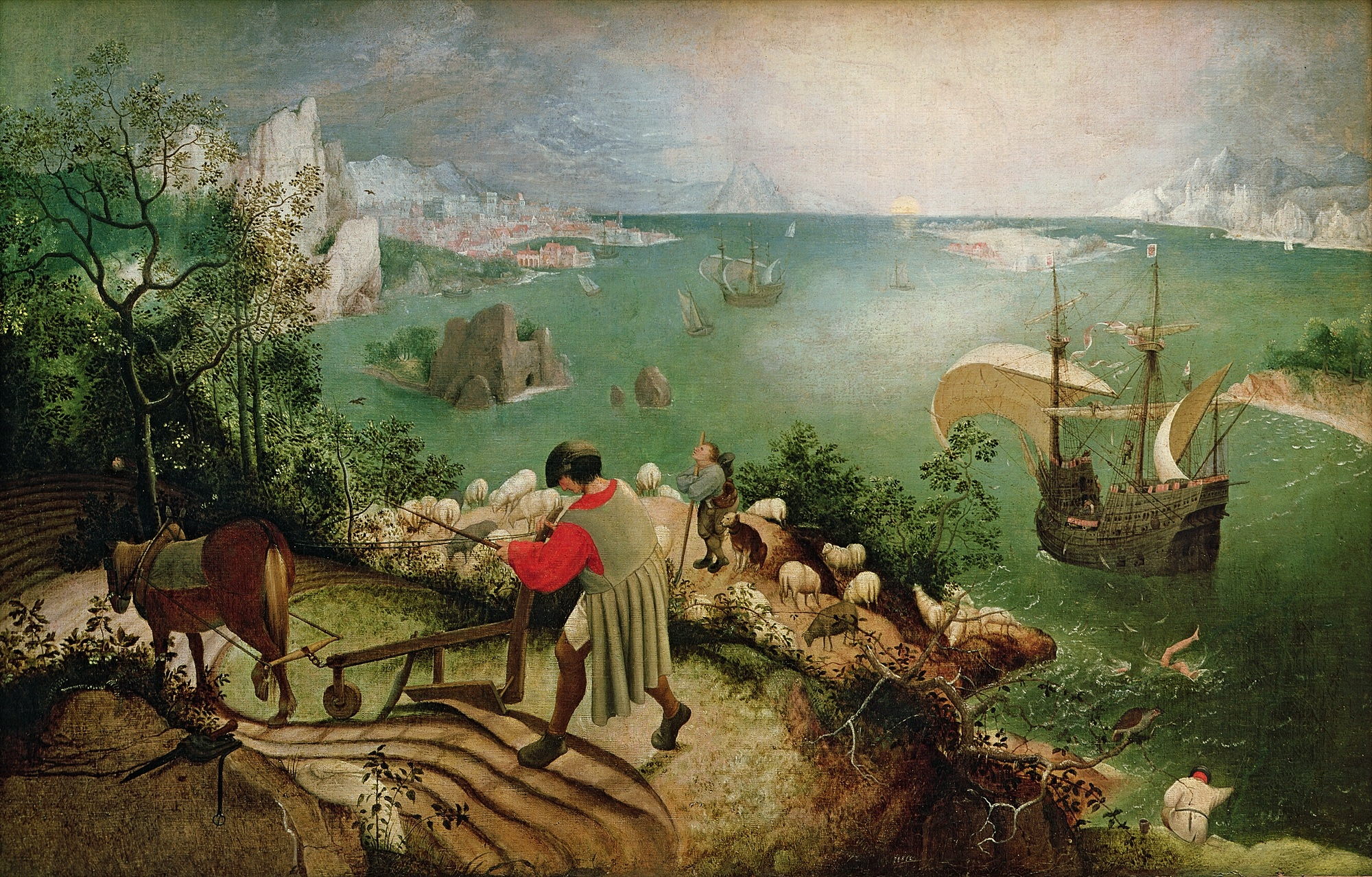
In Bruegel's Landscape with the Fall of Icarus (c. 1558) the fallen Icarus is a small detail at lower right.

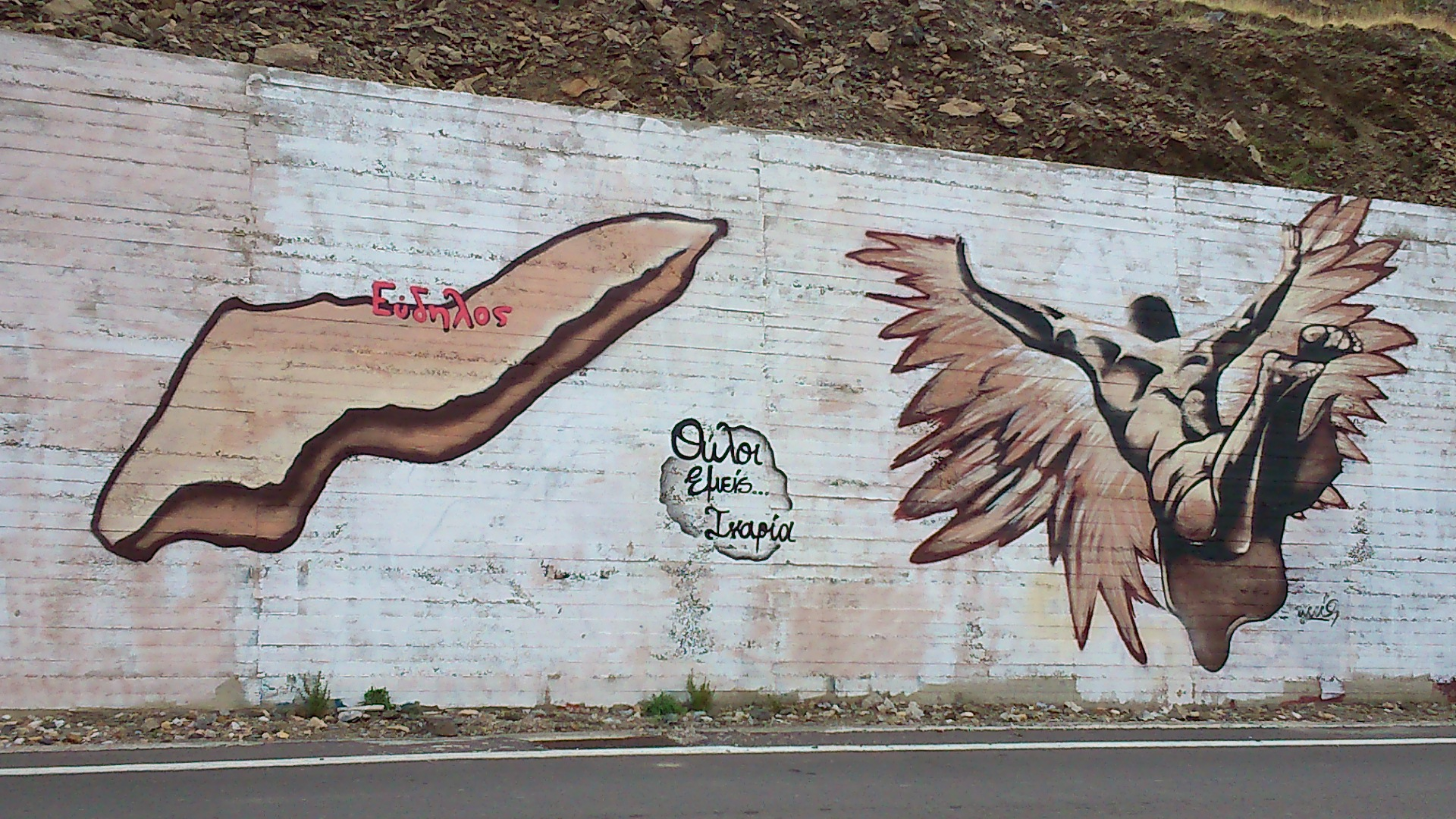
Modern street art of Icaria island and falling Icarus just outside the village of Evdilos on Icaria, Greece

== Interpretation ==
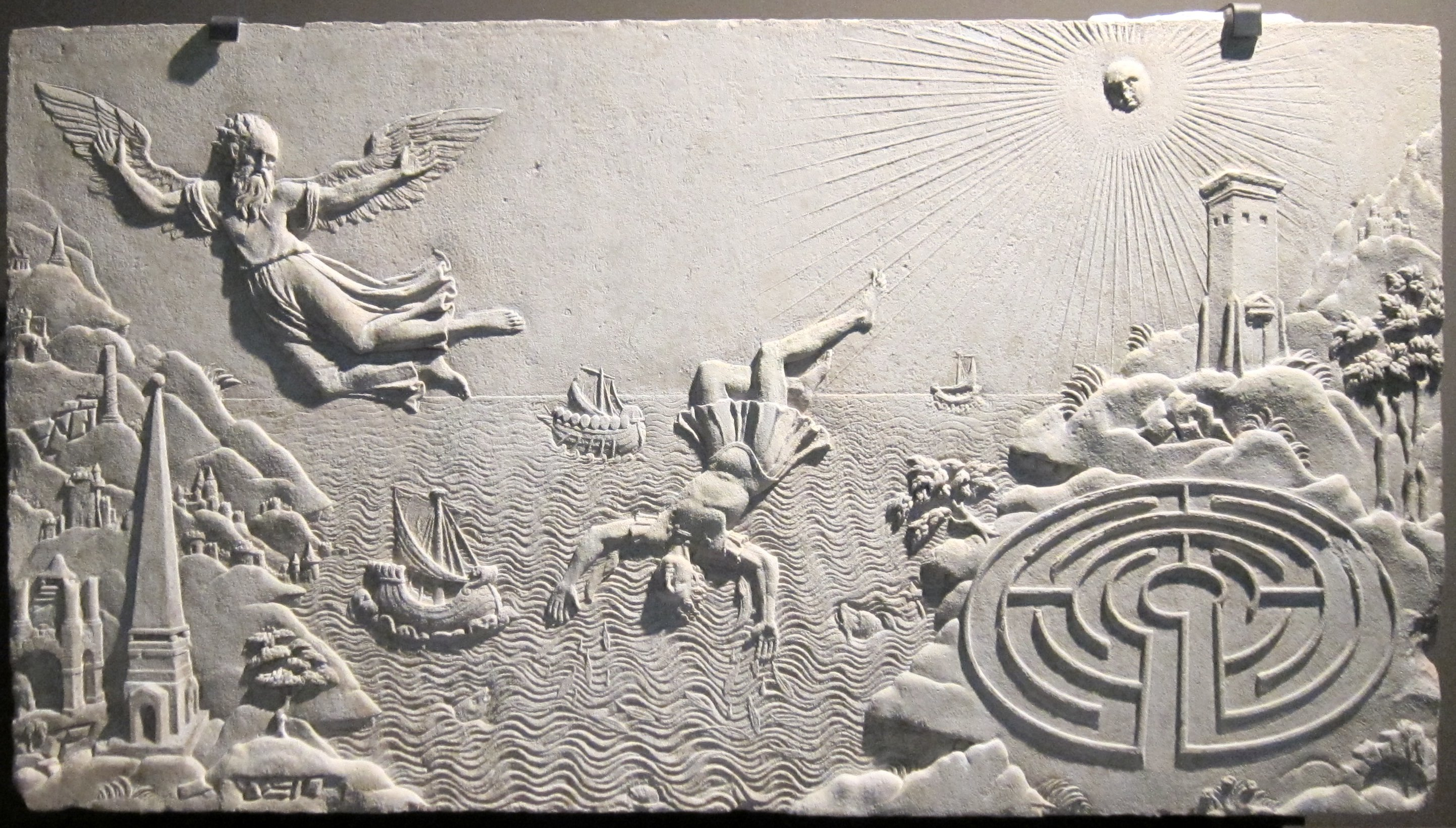
17th-century relief with a Cretan labyrinth bottom right (Musée Antoine Vivenel)

Literary interpretation has considered the myth of Icarus as a consequence of excessive ambition. An Icarus-related study of the Daedalus myth was published by the French hellenist Françoise Frontisi-Ducroux. In psychology, there have been synthetic studies of the Icarus complex with respect to the alleged relationship between fascination for fire, high ambition, and Ascensionism. In the psychiatric mind, features of disease were perceived in the shape of the pendulous emotional ecstatic-high and depressive-low of bipolar disorder. Henry Murray having proposed the term Icarus complex, apparently found symptoms particularly in mania where a person is fond of heights, fascinated by both fire and water, narcissistic and observed with fantastical or far-fetched imaginary cognition. Seth Godin's 2012 The Icarus Deception, points to the historical change in how Western culture both propagated and interpreted the Icarus myth arguing that "We tend to forget that Icarus was also warned not to fly too low, because seawater would ruin the lift in his wings. Flying too low is even more dangerous than flying too high, because it feels deceptively safe."

== See also ==
- Bladud, a legendary king of the Britons, purported to have met his death when his constructed wings failed
- Eilmer of Malmesbury, English Benedictine monk best known for his early attempt at a gliding flight using wings
- Etana, a sort of "Babylonian Icarus"
- Kid Icarus, a Nintendo video game series based on the Icarus myths
- Kua Fu, a Chinese myth about a giant who chased the Sun and died while getting too close
- Sampati, an Indian myth about a bird which lost its wings while trying to save its younger brother from the Sun
