= Landscape with the Fall of Icarus (poem) =

Poem by William Carlos Williams

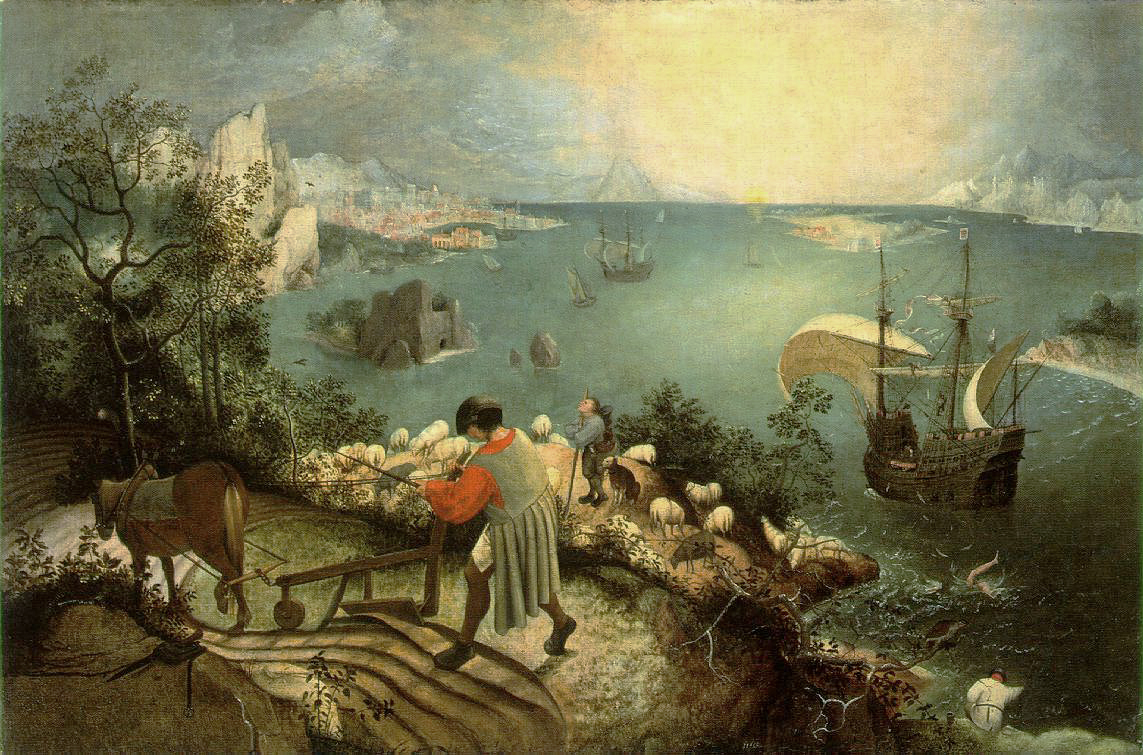
Landscape with the Fall of Icarus, 1558, formerly attributed to Pieter Bruegel the Elder.

"Landscape with the Fall of Icarus" is an ecphrastic poem by the 20th-century American poet William Carlos Williams that was written in response to Landscape with the Fall of Icarus, traditionally attributed to Pieter Bruegel. Williams first published the poem as part of a sequence in The Hudson Review in 1960, subsequently using the sequence as the basis for his final book, Pictures from Brueghel and Other Poems, published in 1962.

The poem, as indicated by the title, touches upon the story from Ovid's Metamorphoses, in which Icarus, the son of Daedalus, took flight from Crete, where he and his father were trapped in exile, wearing wings made from wax and feathers. Icarus, disregarding one of his father's wishes that he not fly too close to the sun, did just that and melted his way to a feathery demise, drowning in the sea. The other warning from Daedalus was to not fly too close to the sea or the feathers of Icarus' wings would get wet and thus fail. This subject – and Bruegel's painting – are also treated by another Modernist poet, W. H. Auden, in "Musée des Beaux Arts", first published in 1939.
