= Landscape with the Fall of Icarus =

Painting by Pieter Bruegel the Elder

- Artist: Pieter Bruegel the Elder(?)
- Year: c. 1560
- Medium: Oil on canvas
- Dimensions: 73.5 cm × 112 cm (28.9 in × 44 in)
- Location: Royal Museums of Fine Arts of Belgium, Brussels

Landscape with the Fall of Icarus is a painting in oil on canvas measuring 73.5 by 112 centimetres (28.9 in × 44.1 in) now in the Oldmasters Museum (part of the Royal Museums of Fine Arts of Belgium) in Brussels. It was long thought to be by the leading painter of Dutch and Flemish Renaissance painting, Pieter Bruegel the Elder. However, following technical examinations in 1996 of the painting hanging in the Brussels museum, that attribution is regarded as very doubtful, and the painting, perhaps painted in the 1560s, is now usually seen as a good early copy by an unknown artist of Bruegel's lost original, perhaps from about 1558. According to the museum: "It is doubtful the execution is by Bruegel the Elder, but the composition can be said with certainty to be his", although recent technical research has re-opened the question. A second version, oil on wood, is currently located in Museum van Buuren, also in Brussels, attributed to the Bruegel circle.

The painting is Bruegel's only subject taken from classical mythology, and is largely derived from Ovid. It is described in W. H. Auden's famous poem "Musée des Beaux-Arts", then the name of the museum in Brussels which holds the painting, and became the subject of a poem of the same name by William Carlos Williams, as well as "Lines on Bruegel's 'Icarus'" by Michael Hamburger.

Though the world landscape (a type of work pioneered by Joachim Patinir where the title subject is represented by small figures in the distance) was an established type in Early Netherlandish painting, the choice to have a much larger unrelated "genre" figure in the foreground is original and represents something of a blow against the emerging hierarchy of genres. Other landscapes by Bruegel, for example The Hunters in the Snow (1565) and others in that series of paintings showing the seasons, show genre figures in a raised foreground, but not so large relative to the size of the image, nor with a subject from a "higher" class of painting in the background.

However, paintings from the same period by the Antwerp artist Pieter Aertsen had large kitchen or market genre scenes, with large figures in the foreground, and in the distant background a glimpse of a scene from the Life of Christ. Giving more prominence to "low" subject-matter than "high" in the same work is a feature of some Northern Mannerist art, often called "Mannerist inversion". The traditional moral of the Icarus story, warning against excessive ambition, is reinforced by (literally) fore-grounding humbler figures who appear content to fill useful agricultural roles in life.

== Description ==
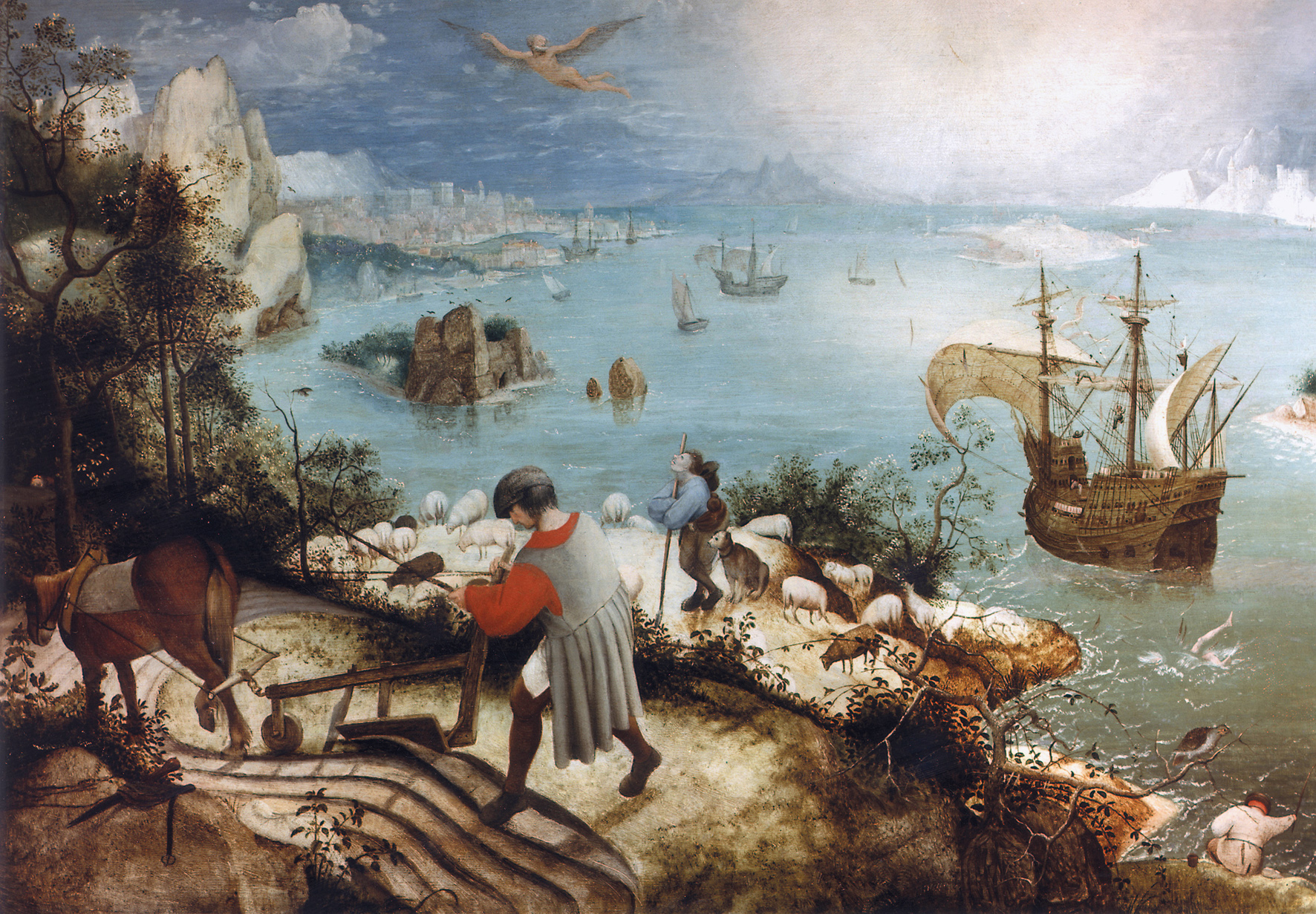
Landscape with the Fall of Icarus, c. 1590–1595, oil on wood (63 cm × 90 cm (25 in × 35 in)), circle of P. Bruegel the Elder, Museum van Buuren, Brussels, Belgium

In Greek mythology, Icarus succeeded in flying, with wings made by his father Daedalus, using feathers secured with beeswax. Ignoring his father's warnings, Icarus chose to fly too close to the Sun, melting the wax, and fell into the sea and drowned. His legs can be seen in the water just below the ship. The Sun, already half-set on the horizon, is a long way away; the flight did not reach anywhere near it. Daedalus does not appear in this version of the painting, though he does, still flying, in the van Buuren one.

The ploughman, shepherd and angler are mentioned in Ovid's account of the legend; they are: "astonished and think to see gods approaching them through the aether", which is not entirely the impression given in the painting. The shepherd gazing into the air, away from the ship, may be explained by another version of the composition (see below); in the original work there was probably also a figure of Daedalus in the sky to the left, at which he stares. There is also a Flemish proverb (of the sort imaged in other works by Bruegel): "And the farmer continued to plough..." (En de boer ... hij ploegde voort") pointing out the ignorance of people to fellow men's suffering. The painting may, as Auden's poem suggests, depict humankind's indifference to suffering by highlighting the ordinary events which continue to occur, despite the unobserved death of Icarus.

== Attribution ==
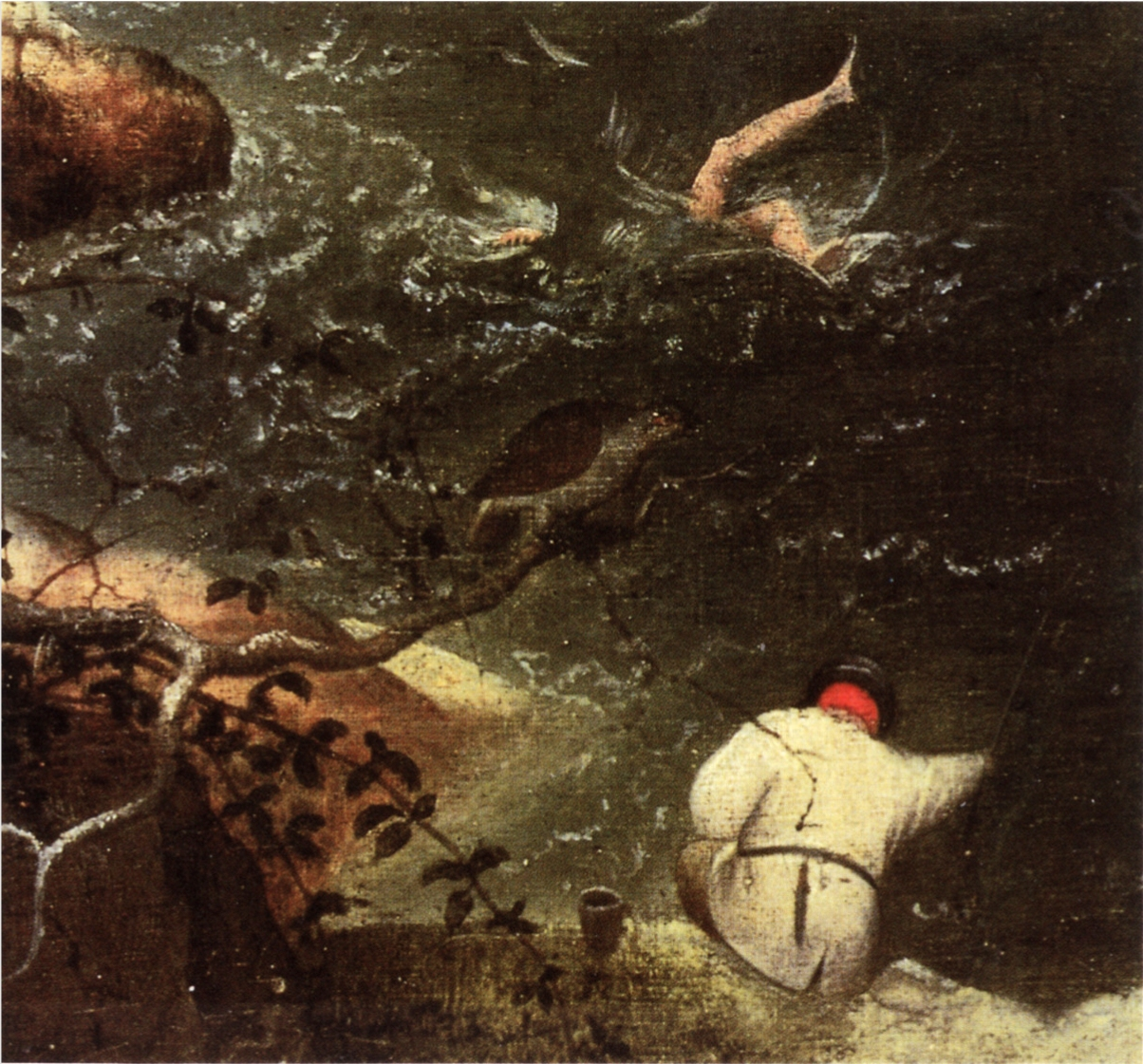
Icarus and the angler

The painting is probably a version of a lost original by Bruegel. A date of c. 1558 has been suggested for the lost original, based on Bruegel's other works; the copy probably comes from the 1560s or soon after. It is in oils whereas Bruegel's other paintings on canvas are in tempera.

The work was unknown until it was bought by the museum in 1912; subsequently another version on panel, generally considered inferior, turned up, which was acquired in 1953 by Daniel van Buuren for his private house, today a museum in Brussels. In this, which excludes the far left and right sides of the composition, Icarus is in the water but Daedelus is still in the air, and the shepherd's gaze is directed at him, explaining one aspect of the composition of the other version. The original would have been Bruegel's only known painting of a mythological subject. The perspective of the ship and figures is not entirely consistent, although this may enhance the power of the composition. Bruegel also produced a design for an engraving with the ship and the two falling figures.

Since its acquisition by the Museum in 1912, its authenticity has been challenged by several specialists, mainly for two reasons: (i) the relatively weak quality of the painting compared to other Bruegels, although this question is complicated by later overpainting; (ii) it is an oil painting on canvas, an exception in the work of Peter Bruegel the Elder who made all his oil paintings on panel.

In 1963, Philippe Roberts-Jones, curator at the museum, and the Bruegel specialist Georges Marlier, hypothesized that an original panel painting had been later moved onto canvas, as was once common.

=== Scientific tests ===
In 1998, a mixed team of scientists from the Belgian Royal Institute for Cultural Heritage and the University of Utrecht attempted to solve the authenticity problem by a radiocarbon dating of the canvas that was supposed to be the original support. As mentioned here above, the conclusion of this dating was that P. Bruegel the Elder cannot have painted on this canvas. Later, in 2006, Prof. J. Reisse (Université libre de Bruxelles) challenged this dating on technical grounds.

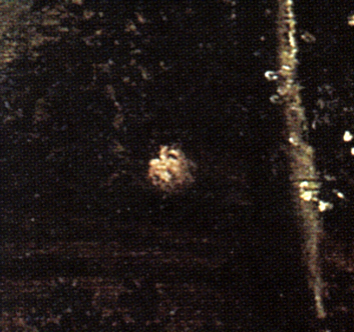
The upturned face in the bushes

A sample of blue paint taken from the right edge in 1973 was re-examined by performing analysis such as scanning electron microscopy (SEM) coupled to the energy dispersive X-ray spectroscopy (EDX), which in connection with optical microscopy revealed the following structure and composition. From bottom to top:

1. Canvas (from transposition);
2. Oily lead white (adhesive);
3. Thick oily layer with azurite (repaint);
4. Chalk ground;
5. Oily lead white with scarce particles of charcoal;
6. Oily blue with azurite;

with layers 4 to 6 being original.

The presence of chalk ground under the original blue proves that this is a panel painting transposed on a canvas. The original blue layer is lead white with azurite containing a few grains of ochre and charcoal. These structure and composition match perfectly those found on other certified panels of Peter Bruegel. Moreover, it is noticeable that the wood charcoal particles are very peculiar, being very long and acicular, exactly the same as those found only in The Census from the same Museum.

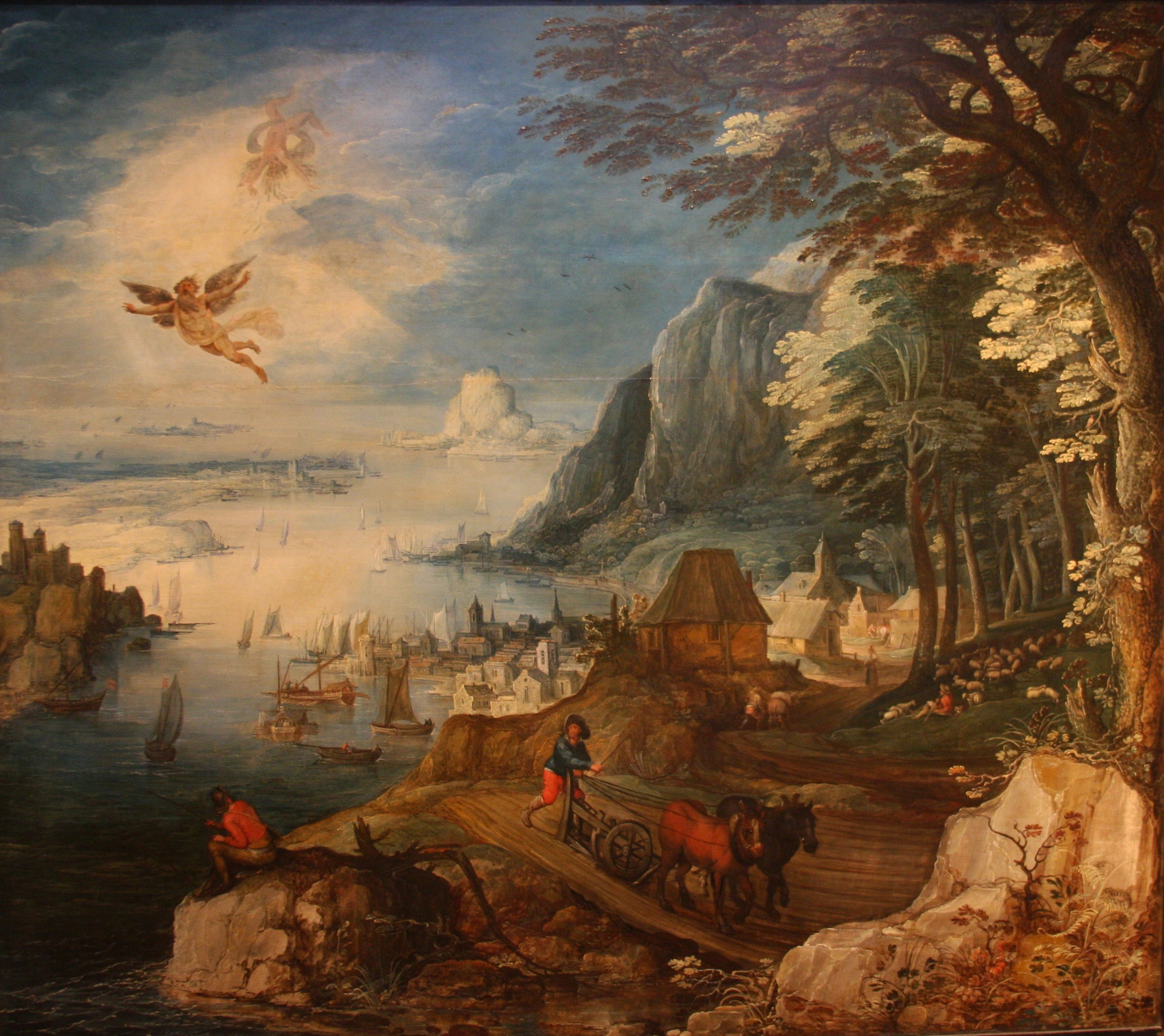
This related work by Joos de Momper includes the ploughman and angler, but Icarus is still in flight, with wax drops falling.

Recently, a study of the underdrawing using infrared reflectography has been published. Reflectography is based on the fact that the infrared light penetrates all colors except black. As a result, the drawing, mostly black, can be made visible. The interpretation of these reflectograms is of course more subjective, but in a global way, the drawing from the Fall of Icarus is not really different from other certified works from Peter Bruegel the Elder. This drawing is generally limited to a layout of the elements, probably because the thin, weakly covering paint on white ground would hide imperfectly a detailed graphism.

A re-interpretation of the reflectograms in agreement with the other analysis suggested the conclusion that the work in the Museum of Fine Arts in Brussels is a panel painting transferred to canvas. The paint layer and maybe also the underdrawing have been severely damaged by this intervention as well as by two more relinings, responsible for the heavy overpainting. In the paint sample remains a fragment with structure and composition matching perfectly the technique of the large panels attributed to Peter Bruegel the Elder. It is therefore unlikely that this version of the Fall of Icarus might be from the hand of a copyist, except perhaps from P. Bruegel the Younger. Conversely, the Van Buuren copy with a different technique cannot be attributed to either Peter Bruegel.

== Mentions in other media ==
The painting is the subject of W. H. Auden's poem of 1938, "Musée des Beaux-Arts", in which Icarus's fall is perceived by the ploughman as "not an important failure". It was also the subject of William Carlos Williams's poem of 1962, "Landscape with the Fall of Icarus" with "a splash quite unnoticed."

Bertolt Brecht mentions this painting in one of his notes about theatre, titled "Alienation Effects in the Narrative Pictures of the Elder Brueghel", published in the revue Bildende Kunst, Nº4 (Berlin, 1957). Brecht praises Brueghel's capacity to create a beautiful Mediterranean landscape, undisturbed by the frightful event, which creates a balanced contrast. The German playwright writes that "he (Brueghel) doesn't allow the catastrophe to alter the idyll".

The painting is shown in Nicolas Roeg's film The Man Who Fell to Earth (1976), where a character opens a book of paintings to an image of it. On the facing page a description points out that the scene remains calm, the event of the fall hardly noticed. The painting also figures into Walter Tevis's 1963 novel on which the film is based. The characters of Newton and Bryce discuss the painting near the end of chapter four, part two. Tevis also mentions the painting in his 1980 novel Mockingbird. In chapter five of the first section narrated by the character Mary Lou, the robot Spofforth brings the painting to her.

Eric Steele, whose film The Bridge (2006) documents the suicides of two-dozen people who jumped off the world's most popular suicide site – the Golden Gate Bridge – throughout 2004, has compared images captured in his documentary to those of Bruegel's Landscape With the Fall of Icarus, because the fatal leaps go almost unnoticed by passersby.

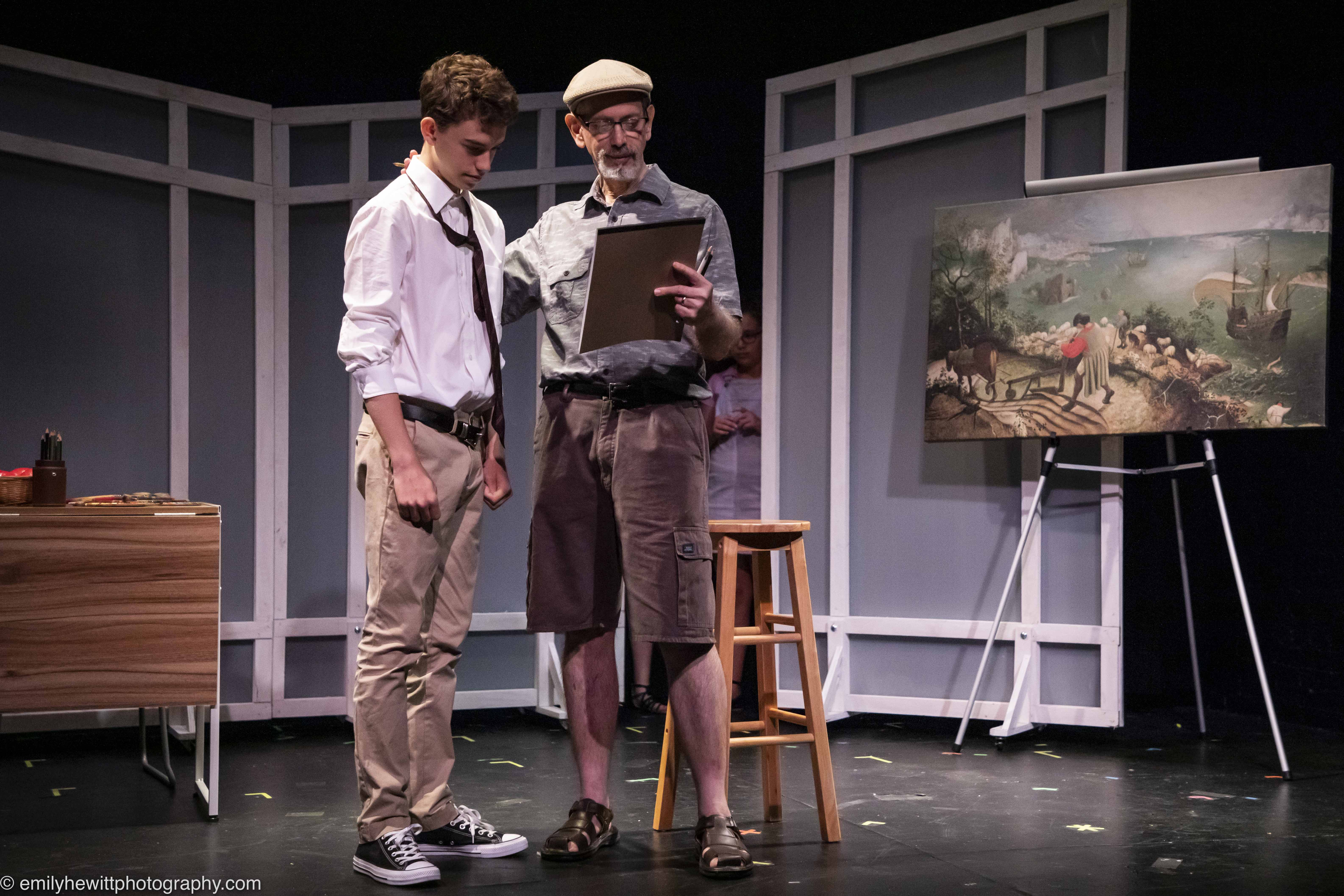
Coltrane Gilman and Michael Gnat* in front of Bruegel's painting. Round Went the Wheel by Frank Ceruzzi; directed by Janet Bentley. Broadway Bound Festival 2019. Photo: Emily Hewitt. (*Appears courtesy of Actors' Equity Association.)

Composer Brian Ferneyhough's 1988 chamber work La Chute d'Icare was inspired by the painting:

What this piece attempts to suggest is ... less a reflection on the heroic-tragic dimension of the underlying myth than a transcription of the strange sensation of "already having been" which is brilliantly evoked by Breughel in the view of a world serenely pursuing its own concerns, completely oblivious to the almost invisible tiny pair of legs waving pathetically out of the water, the only record of the apocalyptic event being a pair of feathers floating disconsolately down in the wake of their erstwhile owner.

The painting features prominently in Frank Ceruzzi's dystopian play Round Went the Wheel (2019), where children take control of the world and use the painting and the Icarus myth as a way to teach the adult population about hubris and the dangers of technology. The painting was included in the 1980 television series 100 Great Paintings.

The painting is also the subject of the Titus Andronicus song "Upon Viewing Bruegel's Landscape with the Fall of Icarus":

In the painting from the original song, in the corner, you see this tiny guy falling into the ocean. It's been interpreted as: It's a big world, and people go about their business, and little tragedies are happening all the time, and what are you going to do?
— Patrick Stickles, Titus Andronicus

The painting appears in a background of the music video for the song "Blood Sweat & Tears" by South Korean group BTS. The video opens in a museum with another Bruegel painting, The Fall of the Rebel Angels featured prominently.

The painting is mentioned in 2022 in season six of the television series The Good Fight, and a fragment of it is shown full screen.

The painting is an important plot point in the 2025 novel by Wally Lamb, The River Is Waiting.
