= Michel Draguet =

- Born: 23 January 1964 (age 62); Ixelles, Belgium
- Title: Art Historian, Lecturer of History of Modern Art at Université Libre de Bruxelles, previously Chief Curator of the Royal Museum of Fine Arts of Belgium

Michel Draguet (born 23 January 1964) is a Belgian art historian, professor at the Université libre de Bruxelles, and previously the director and CEO of the Royal Museums of Fine Arts of Belgium since May 2005. Draguet is a member of the board of the federal administration for science: the Belgian Science Policy Office (BELSPO).

== Presentation ==
Michel Draguet oversaw the Museum of Oldmasters, the Fin-de-siècle Museum, the Museum of Modern Art, the Magritte Museum and two private artistic houses: the Antoine Wiertz Workplace and the Meunier House.

In 2015, with 767.355 visitors, The Royal Fine Arts Museum of Belgium was considered as the 82nd museum in the world (Top 100 Art Museum Attendance).

Following the bombing attack in Brussels in March 2016, the museum lost 40% of its attendance. Since 2016, the institution rebuilt its position. In 2017, The Royal Fine Arts Museum of Belgium is the leading cultural institution in Belgium with 649.337 visitors.

Michel Draguet joined the Royal Museums of Fine Arts of Belgium in May 2005 from his position of Professor of Art History of the 19th and the 20th Centuries at Université libre de Bruxelles where he has been serving since 1990.

Between August 2010 and February 2014, Michel Draguet was also designated by the Minister in Charge of Federal Science Policy as Acting Director of the Royal Museums of Art and History. Defending federal art collections against dismantling, Michel Draguet was at the core of a debate. Nevertheless, Michel Draguet got a positive evaluation in April 2017 and started a new six years mandate running until 2023. In 2023, Draguet stepped down after staff raised allegations that he had cultivated a toxic work environment, marked by harassment, sexism, racism, and other issues.

Michel Draguet is a member of the class of Arts of the Royal Academies for Science and the Arts of Belgium, elected on 6 January 2005.

== Work ==
Michel Draguet studied Art History at Université libre de Bruxelles from 1983 to 1987. In 1987, he gets his master's degree in Art History and Archeology with a dissertation related to "The Concept of Space in the roots of Abstract Art : Kandinsky, Mondran, Malévitch". This dissertation won the Masui Prise in 1988.

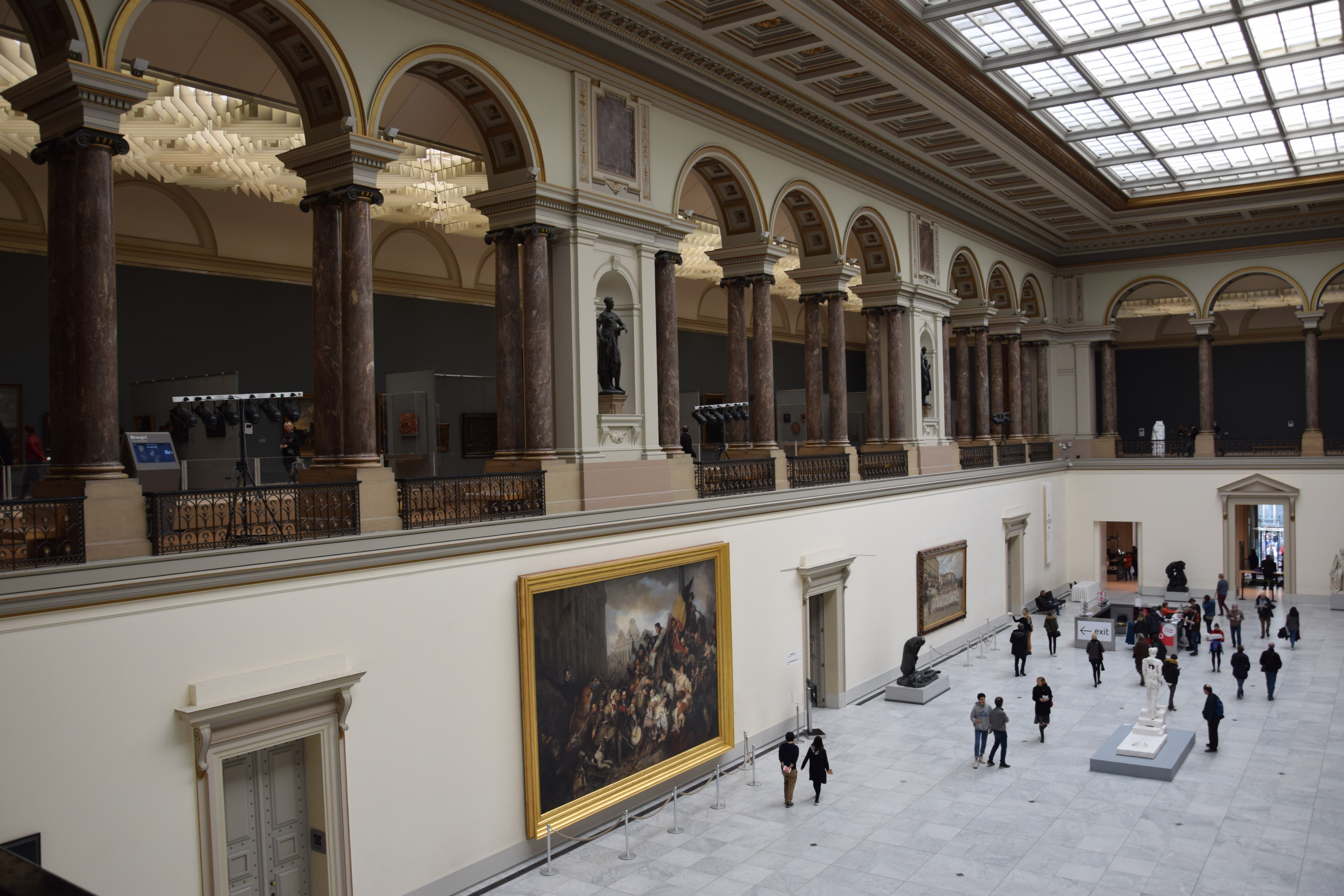
The main hall of the Royal Museums of Fine Arts of Belgium

From 1989 to 1993, Michel Draguet was a Research Fellow at the Belgian National Fund for Scientific Research (FNRS).

In 1990, Michel Draguet gets his PhD (Origins of Abstract Art from Kandinsky to Malévitch (1911—1918)) with the Greatest distinction. From 1993 to 1995, Michel Draguet is a Postdoctoral Researcher at the Belgian National Fund for Scientific Research (FNRS).

From the beginning of his studies till 1990, he worked closely with Philippe Robert-Jones, Chief Curator of the Royal Museums of Fine Arts of Belgium, initially as an assistant and, from 1990, as a colleague.

With Philippe Roberts-Jones, Michel Draguet published books and catalogues and managed exhibitions dedicated to Abstract Art in Belgium and to a famous Belgian sculptor André Willequet.

From 1995 until 2000, Michel Draguet became Research Associate and, from 2000 till 2001, Senior Research Associate at the Belgian National Fund for Scientific Research (FNRS). Since 1990, Michel Draguet is Lecturer of History of Modern Art at Université Libre de Bruxelles. He became professor in History of Modern Art (19th-20thCenturies) in 2004 and since 2005 Associate Professor. He is still in charge of the Research Center René Magritte (CEREM) and of the International Bernheim Chair.

In 2005, Michel Draguet is designated as Chief Curator of the Royal Museums of Fine Arts of Belgium for a first mandate of 6 years. He get a second mandate in 2011 and a third one in 2017.

Between 2010 and 2014, Michel Draguet is designated General Director ad-interim of the Royal Museums of Art and History of Belgium.

Between 1992 and 2004, he also free-lanced as Press Correspondent of Le Journal des arts (Paris).

=== University and research ===
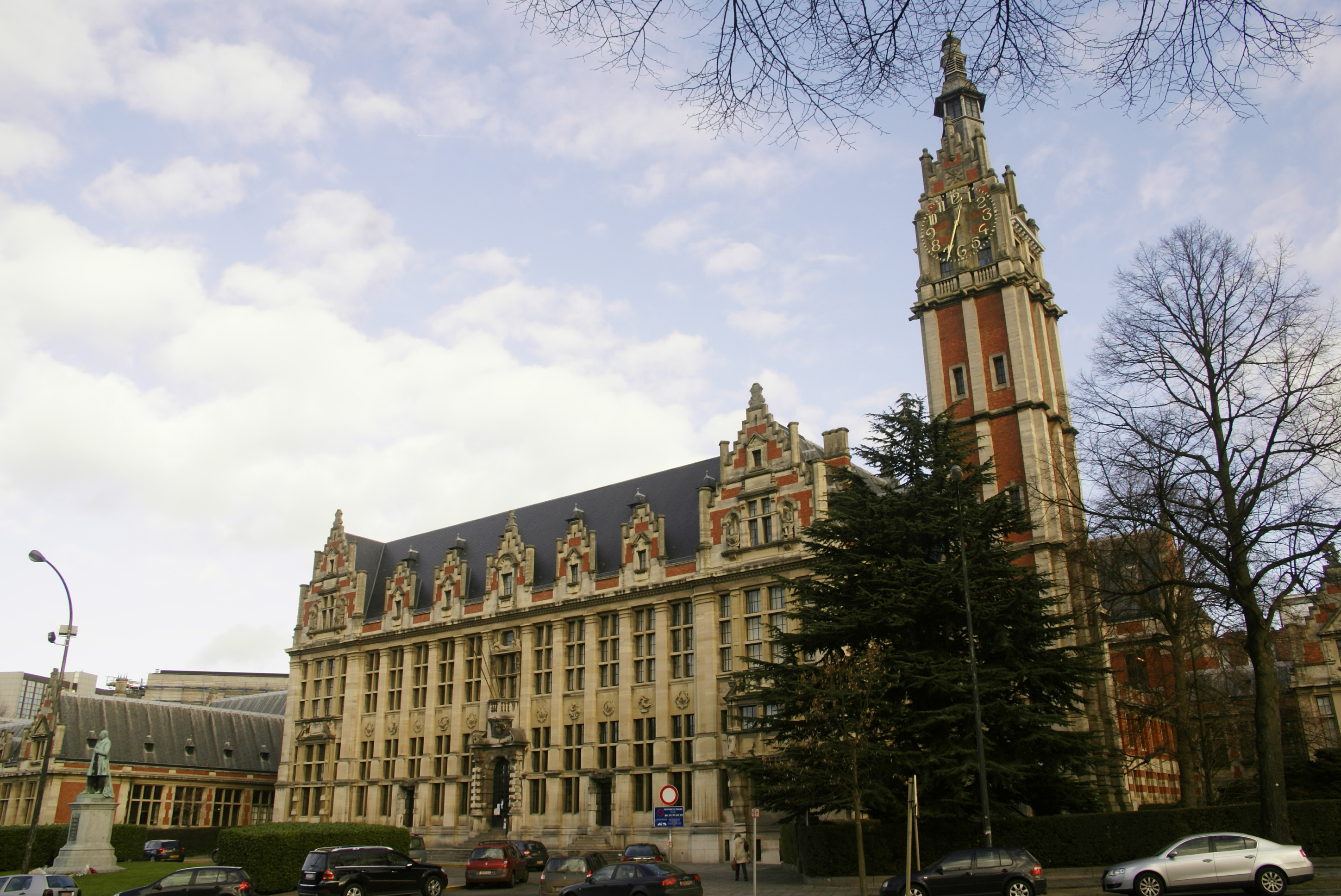
Université libre de Bruxelles (Brussels, Belgium)

As specialist of the Fin-de-siècle, Michel Draguet published several studies books dedicated to :

- Fernand Khnopff, L'ambigu poétique in 1996 (Arthur Merghelynck Prize from the Royal Academy of Belgium)
- Fernand Khnopff: Portrait of Jeanne Kefer in 2004 for the J. Paul Getty Museum in Los Angeles
- James Ensor ou La fantasmagorie, Gallimard, 1999.
- Félicien Rops, Bellinzone, Quaderni di Villa dei Cedri, 1992.

His studies about symbolism are now international reference (Le Symbolisme en Belgique, Anvers, Fonds Mercator, 2005. Second Edition, 2010) and conducted him to organize several exhibitions :

- La peinture symboliste en Belgique in Japan
- Fernand Khnopff at le Petit Palais in France
- Der Kuss der Sphinx in Austria
- La Belgique dévoilée de l'Impressionnisme à l'Expressionnisme in Switzerland.

As author and curator, Michel Draguet's researches are essentially focused on art of the 20th century with two main topics : Magritte and the Surrealism and CoBrA and the abstract heritage in Modern Art.

In 2003, Michel Draguet created the Centre de Recherche René Magritte at Université libre de Bruxelles (ULB).

Curator and Co-curator of several Magritte exhibition :

- Magritte. L'impero delle luci, Como, Villa Olmo, 2006
- Magritte. Il Mistero della natura, Milan, Palazzo Reale, 2008-2009
- Magritte, Œuvres sur papier, Paris, Dina Verny Museum, 2006
- Magritte, Œuvres sur papier, Rotterdam, Boymans Van Beuningen Museum, 2006-2007
- Magritte and Contemporary Art : The Treachery of Images, with Stephanie Barron, Los Angeles, Los Angeles County Museum of Art (LACMA), 2006-2007
- Magritte. Empire of Dreams, Seoul & Beijing National Museum of Contemporary Art (NAMOC), 2006-2007
- René Magritte, Tokyo, National Center for the Arts, 2015
- René Magritte, Kyoto, Municipal Museum of Arts, 2015
- Magritte, Broodthaers and Contemporary Art, Brussels, Royal Museums of Fine Arts of Belgium, 2017-2018

In 2009, he created, with the support of the Magritte Foundation and GDF-Suez, the Magritte Museum as part of the Royal Museums of Fine Arts of Belgium. With an average annual attendance of 350.000 visitors, the Magritte Museum is a flagship for Brussels.

As concerns CoBrA, Michel Draguet was curator of the Christian Dotremont retrospective in 2004 (Christian Dotremont. Les Développements de l'œil, Mons, Museum of Fine Arts, 2004), co-curator of the CoBrA show and the Alechinsky retrospective at the Royal Museums of Fine Arts of Belgium. For the purpose of this exhibition, he published an extensive study about the work of Alechinsky : Alechinsky de A à Y. In 2016, he organized the first large retrospective of Alechinsky held in Japan.

Draguet is also the author and curator of shows dedicated to contemporary artists like Thierry de Cordier, Hiroshi Sugimoto or Andres Serrano.

He also published studies about Chinese contemporary artist and Nobel Prize 2000 Gao Xingjian (Gao Xingjian. Le goût de l’encre, Paris, Hazan, 2002. Second Edition, 2015) in correlation with exhibition in Mons and Ixelles.

In 1998, his book Chronology of the XX Century Art (Paris, Flammarion (Tout l'art-Encyclopédies), 1997. Second Edition, 2003) won the Wernaers Prize from the Belgian National Fund for Scientific Research (FNRS).

As author, Michel Draguet, published a total of 27 books (the latest one dedicated to Nagas (Naga : Awe Inspiring Beauty, Brussels, Fonds Mercator, 2018)) and more than 107 articles or contributions to catalogues. He curated 45 exhibitions in Belgium, Netherlands, France, Greece, Italy, Korea, China, Japan and the US.

He published a large number of exhibition catalogues and a wide spectrum of other writings on modern and contemporary art, on museum management, and lectured extensively on these subjects as well.

=== Royal Museums of Fine Arts of Belgium ===
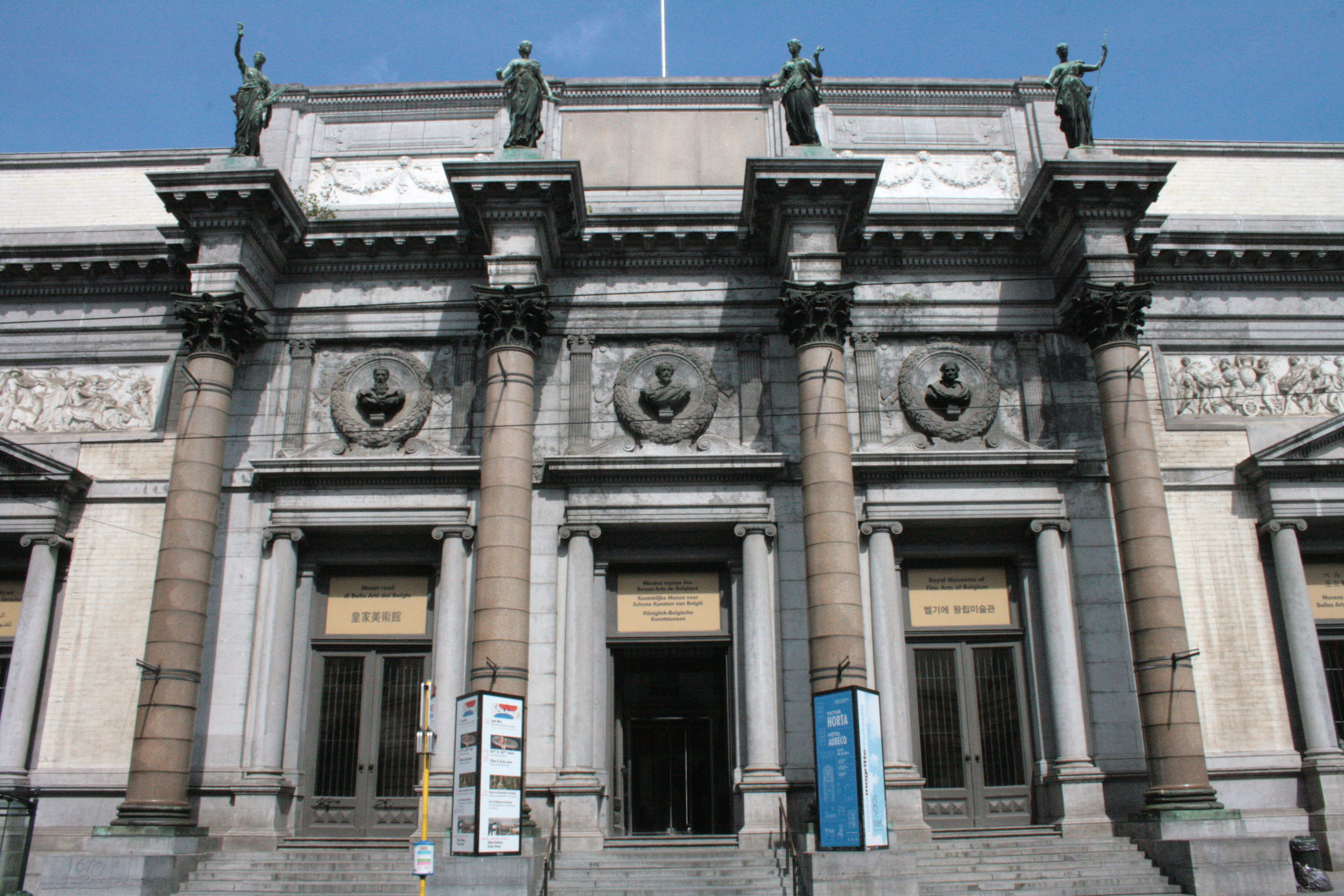
Royal Museums of Fine Arts of Belgium

The Museums’ collections trace the history of the visual arts – painting, sculpture and drawing – from the 15th to the 21st centuries. They preserve the works of the Flemish Primitives, of Pieter Bruegel, Peter Paul Rubens, Jacques Jordaens, Jacques Louis David, Auguste Rodin, James Ensor, Paul Gauguin, Fernand Khnopff, Henry Moore, Paul Delvaux, René Magritte, Marcel Broodthaers, Jan Fabre and many others. This jewel among Belgium's cultural institutions comprises several entities: the Musée Old Masters Museum, the Musée Modern Museum, the Musée Wiertz Museum and the Musée Meunier Museum, the Musée Magritte Museum and the Musée Fin-de-Siècle Museum.

Michel Draguet repositioned the Royal Museums of Fine Arts of Belgium nationally as well as internationally through a redeployment of the collection focused on the specificity of Belgian creation as well as on the particularity of Belgian reception of European creation.

In 2009, he created the Magritte Museum with, for the first time in Belgium, a private-public partnership (with GDF-Suez) on competencies. The selection of works exhibited in the Royal Museums of Fine Arts of Belgium is constantly expanding with a changing selection of external loans. With the support of Belgian and foreign museums as well as private collectors, works are being made available that have previously never been exhibited. The visitor can thus discover many treasures that are still in private possession. Since its creation, this museum, measuring 2500 m^{2}, has welcomed more than two million visitors and thus contributed to the economic and cultural development of the Belgian capital. The Magritte Museum has already received 8 nominations and prizes. Every year more than 300,000 visitors come here from all over the world to discover the life and the works of René Magritte.

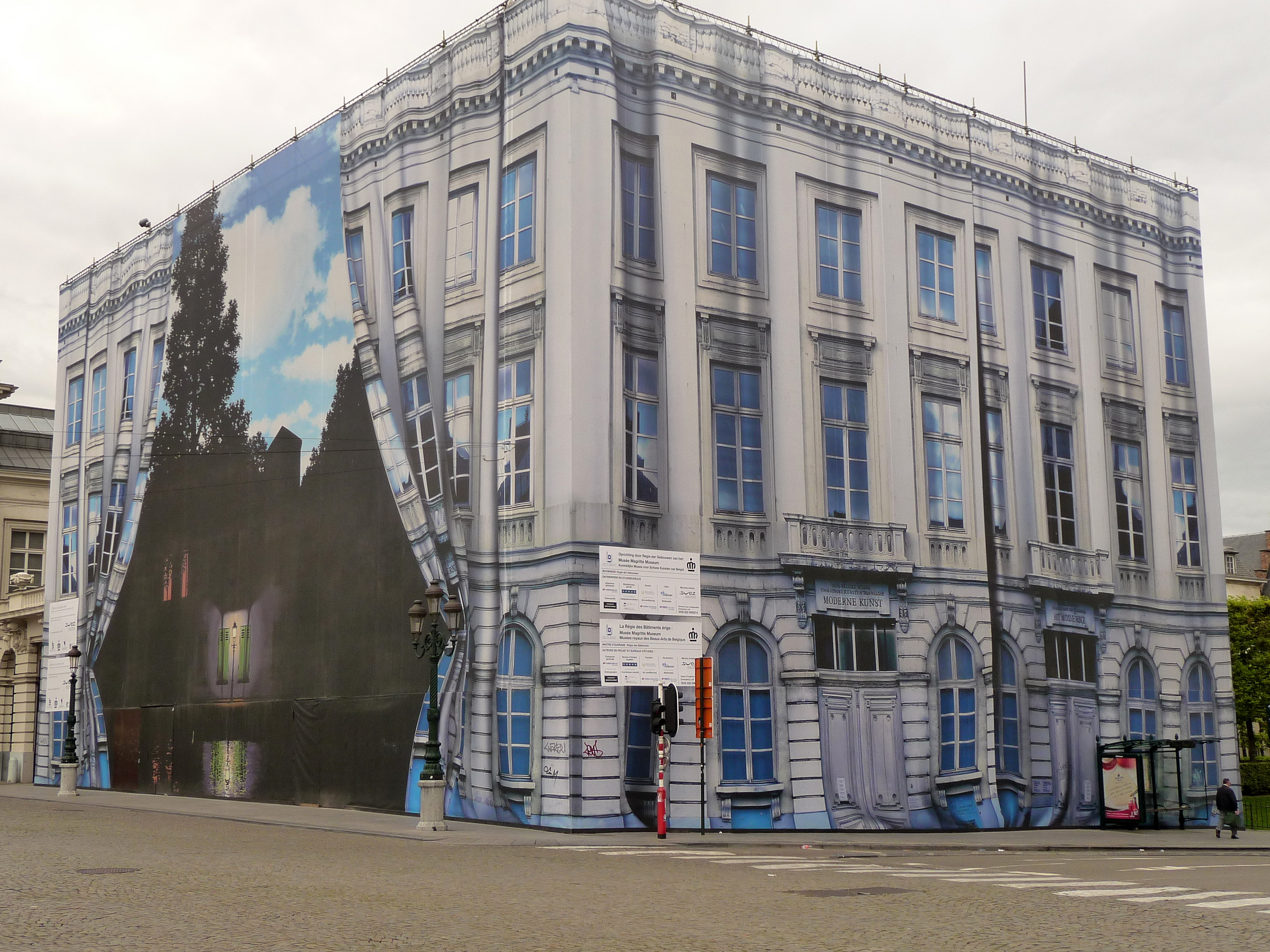
Magritte Museum

In 2013, Michel Draguet inaugurated the Fin-de-siècle Museum as first chapter of a new conception of a museum of Modern Art. Famous visual artists like Constantin Meunier, James Ensor, Henri Evenepoel, Fernand Khnopff, Léon Spilliaert and Georges Minne testify to the effervescent activity of this period, reflected also in all other creative fields: literature, opera, music, architecture, photography and poetry (Maurice Maeterlinck, Emile Verhaeren, Octave Maus, Victor Horta, Henry Van de Velde, Maurice Kufferath, Guillaume Lekeu and others). Art Nouveau architecture is evoked by means of a 3D reconstruction of six buildings Art Nouveau. This was the first introduction of new technologies inside de Museum. Located at the heart of Brussels, where between 1884 and 1914 the exhibitions of Les XX and La Libre Esthétique made the city one of the artistic capitals of the late 19th century, this museum is distinguished by its multidisciplinary nature, through a partnership formed with the Royal Library, the Théâtre Royal de la Monnaie, the Royal Museums of Art and History, Cinematek, the Bibliotheca Wittockiana, the King Baudouin Foundation and the Brussels Capital Region for housing the Gillion Crowet collection, which is one of the museum's highlights. The Fin-de-Siècle Museum, which was applauded internationally when it opened, welcomed 170,000 visitors during its first operating year.

Michel Draguet also initiates an exhibition program from ancient masters to contemporary art mounting up to eight major shows per year. The quality and quantity of this program has been supported by a renewing strategy to the public in its diversity. In this way, Draguet initiates "Museum on measure": a program dedicated to fragilized public supported by charity. In parallel, the educational services have developed a range of new activities and the social programs have been extended. This is a result of the increase in partnerships between the public and private sectors .

Among the highlights of the programme have been large exhibitions such as "Art Nouveau Bing", "Rubens in Brussels", "CoBrA", "Alechinsky", "Leon Spilliaert" "Jordaens and Antiquity", "The Flemish Primitives in Brussels", "Andres Serrano", "Marc Chagall", "Kandinsky and Europe", "Symbolism in Belgium" and "Stanley Kubrick Photographer". Michel Draguet introduced also a wide spectrum of new exhibition formats with from small "cabinet exhibitions" on such artists Pierre Lahaut, Jules Schmalzigaug, Hiroshi Sugimoto, and others. He placed permanent installation of contemporary artist inside the OldMasters department like David Altmejd or Jan Fabre.

For many years now, the Royal Museums of Fine Arts of Belgium has been the most popular art institution in Belgium. In 2015, the Museum had its best attended year so far with a total of 767.355 visitors. This strategy was accompanied by a significant increase in corporate funding. From 2005 until 2017, the number of visitors has doubled and the turnover tripled, thereby reducing the State contribution from 54.4% of the global budget to 32%. And this has been achieved during a period of very severe budgetary cuts: 11% in 2013 and 2014, 30% for the period 2015–2019.

The online and digital outreach of the Royal Museums of Fine Arts of Belgium is considered as pioneer. In this perspective, Draguet initiated the Bruegel. Unseen Masterpieces project which allows members of the public to delve into the works of Pieter Bruegel the Elder († Brussels, 1569). While the artist and his paintings are instantly recognizable worldwide, every composition also depicts a whole host of characters - some surprising, others familiar - and vignettes that provide the subtext of history, which are masterpieces worthy of exploration in their own right.

Drawing on a wide spectrum of virtual and on-site experiences, this initiative offers everyone the chance to immerse themselves in Bruegel's works by honing in on the details of each painting and accessing expert knowledge. By delving deeper into the artist's world, the viewer will discover the elements in Bruegel's works which constitute the pinnacle of the Flemish artist's craft. The Royal Museums of Fine Arts of Belgium launched this project jointly with the Google Cultural Institute in anticipation of the 450thanniversary of Bruegel's death, in 2019. The project brings together major international museums, many of which are European, around the focal figure of Bruegel the Elder. This concept is the fruit of in-depth thinking on current transformations in the field of museology as it adapts to the digital era.

The Bruegel. Unseen Masterpieces virtual exhibitions' can be accessed on the Royal Museums of Fine Arts of Belgium's interactive screens, on their mobile app and on the Google Cultural Institute platform.

=== Royal Museums of Art and History ===
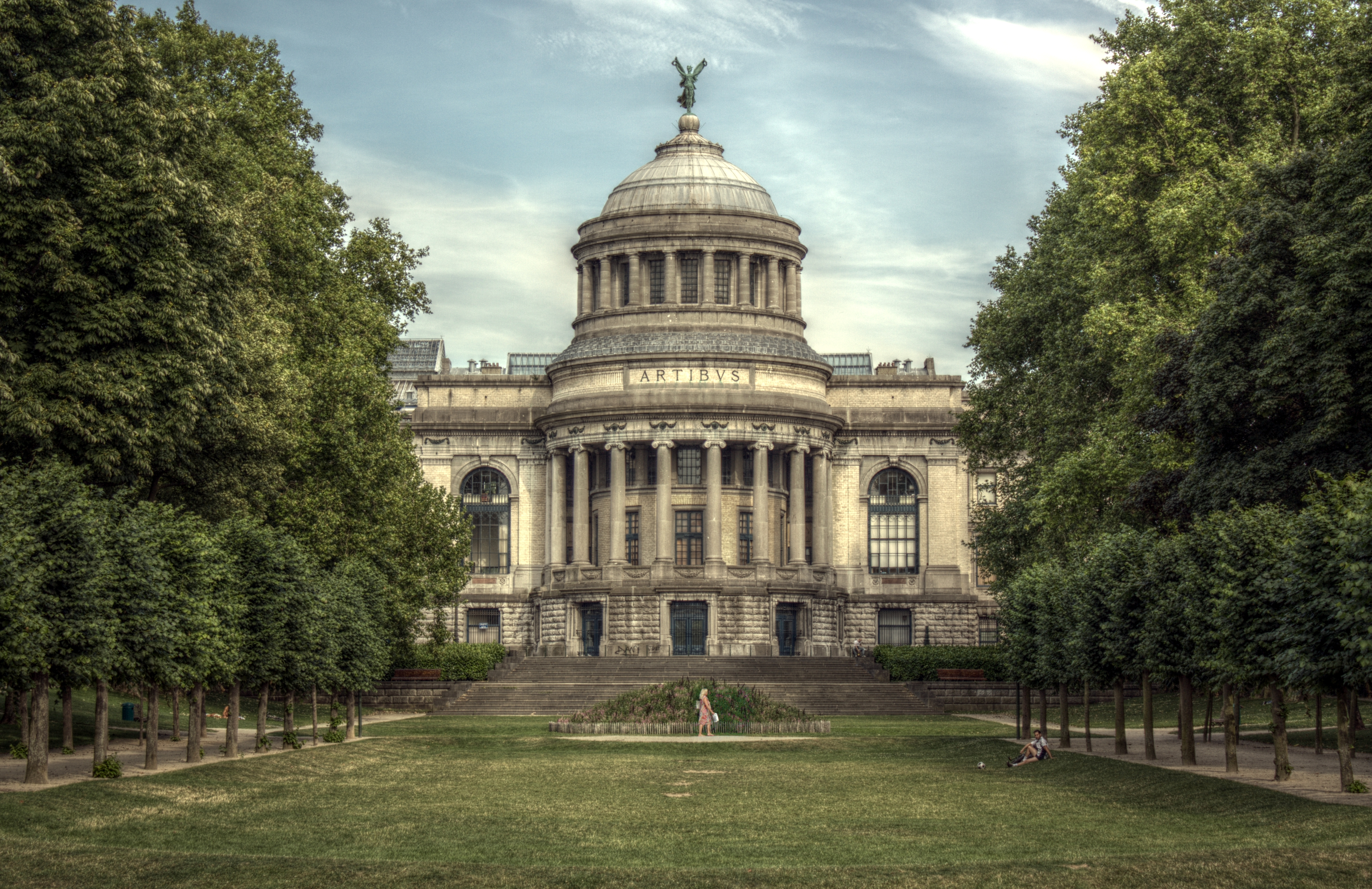
Royal Museums of Art and History of Belgium

From 1 August 2010 till 28 February 2014, Michel Draguet was designated temporary Director-General of the Royal Museums of Art and History. This entity includes the Museum of Antiquities, the Museum of Non-European Civilizations, the Museum of the Decorative Arts, the Chinese Pavilion, the Japanese Tower, Halle Gate, and the Museum of Musical Instruments.

He was charged to manage this institution, which was then in crisis, to overhaul its accounts and structure. Under his leading, the museum put together a restructuring plan that, starting with the merging of the support staff, created enough flexibility to allow modernization of the administrative organizations of both entities – the Royal Museums of Art and History and Royal Museums of Fine Arts.

Michel Draguet initiated a large project of redeployment of both institutions. The home of the former would house collections of a more universalist nature, on the model of the Louvre and British Museum, and that of the latter would offer a more "national" foundation that broadens to embrace a European dynamic comprising the very future of Brussels as the capital of what is today a common space. From there came the idea of redeploying the collections in accordance with two guidelines: first, to bring the federal collections together in one place; second, to develop theme-based museums that complement rather than compete with one another.

Together the Royal Museums of Fine Arts and Art and History welcome more than 1.1 million visitors a year: this is the equivalent of the population of Brussels. Merged, the two institutions would increase their attractiveness to the public: by reorganizing the presentation of the collections between the different institutions; by creating poles of scientific excellence based on the strong points of the collections; by creating new museum entities that offer a new dimension for marketing the city of Brussels; and by rationalizing the teams and practices employed. For the Royal Museums of Art and History, the entities proposed are as follows : a Museum of Non-European Civilizations, which would initially be a world museum through the eyes of Europeans, on the basis of which a new intercultural dialogue could be initiated; a Museum of Antiquities as a platform for the European identity; and a Museum of Music that will broaden the perspectives of the current Museum of Musical Instruments. Plus a few heritage assets – the Chinese Pavilion, the Japanese Tower and Halle Gate – which contribute to the attractiveness of the city.

His plan for redeployment of both the collections and personnel that would culminate in the fusion of the two entities was discussed at the Belgian Parliament in 2012. Without initiative from the politics and considering that his Secretary of State was not supporting the reforme led by him and by the chairman of Belspo Philippe Mettens, Michel Draguet decided to step down in April 2014.

== Other activities ==
Michel Draguet is a member of various boards including the following:

- Member of the Board of the International Centre for Studies in 19th Century.
- Member of the Board of the Magritte Foundation.
- Member of the Board of the Belgian National Fund for Scientific Research (FNRS)
- Director Class II of the American Friends of the Magritte Museum (2015-2016)
- Member of the Scientific Committee for the exhibition Le Grand atelier, Brussels, Center for Arts-Europalia (2007)
- Member of the Scientific Committee for the exhibition, Russian Avant-Garde, Brussels Center for Arts-Europalia (2005)
- Editorial Advisor Hazan - Paris (2000-2005)
- Member of the Scientific Committee for the exhibition Brussels crossroad of Europe, Crossroad of Culture, Brussels, Center for Arts-Europalia (2000)
- Official Representative of Belgium (French speaking section) International Committee of History of Art (CIHA) (1998-2005)
- Expert of the Acquisition Committee; King Baudouin Foundation (1997-2005)
- Editorial Advisor Flammarion (Paris) (1991-2000)
- Cabinet Secretary for arts and monuments, French Community of Belgium : Minister Valmy Féaux (1990-1992)

== Awards ==
Michel Draguet was honored by :

- Officier de l’Ordre de Léopold (2011)
- Officier de l'Ordre des Arts et des Lettres by the French Minister of Culture (2011)
- Chevalier de la Légion d’Honneur (Legion of Honour) by the President of the French Republic Nicolas Sarkozy (2011)

== Selected publications ==
- Khnopff ou l’ambigu poétique, Brussels-Paris, Crédit Communal-Flammarion, 1995.
- Chronologie de l’art du XXe siècle, Paris, Flammarion (Tout l’art-Encyclopédies), 1997. Second Edition, 2003
- L’Art Nouveau retrouvé. Peinture, sculpture et arts décoratifs dans les collections Gillion Crowet, Milan-Paris, Skira-Le Seuil, 1999
- Treasures of Art Nouveau, Londres, Thames & Hudson, 1999.
- Ensor ou la fantasmagorie, Paris, Gallimard, 1999.
- Gao Xingjian. Le goût de l’encre, Paris, Hazan, 2002. Second Edition, 2015.
- Magritte, Paris, Hazan, 2003.
- Le Symbolisme en Belgique, Anvers, Fonds Mercator, 2005. Second Edition, 2010.
- Magritte tout en papier (collages, dessins, gouaches), Paris, Hazan, 2006
- Dutch Issue : Voici Magritte, gouaches, studies, collages, tekeningen, schilderijen, Rotterdam, Boymans-Van Beuningen, 2006.
- Alechinsky de A à Y, Paris, Gallimard, 2007.
- Monet. Les Nymphéas grandeur nature, Paris, Hazan, 2010.
- Magritte. Biographie, Paris, Gallimard, 2014.
- Naga : Awe Inspiring Beauty, Brussels, Fonds Mercator, 2018
