= Royal Museums of Fine Arts of Belgium =

Art museums in Brussels, Belgium

- Musées royaux des Beaux-Arts de Belgique (French); Koninklijke Musea voor Schone Kunsten van België (Dutch)
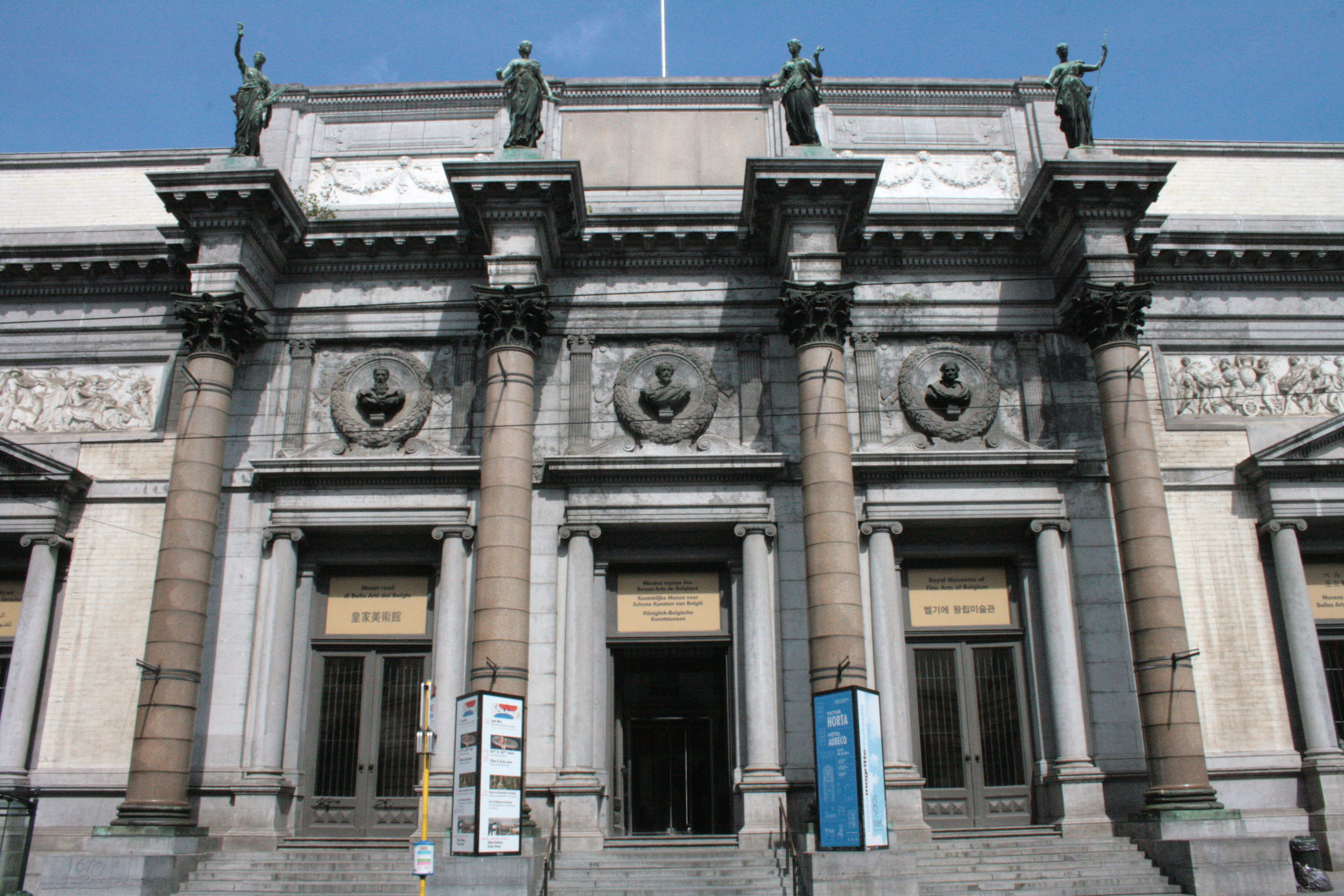
- Entrance to the Oldmasters Museum in the Palace of Fine Arts of Brussels
- Interactive fullscreen map
- Established: 1 September 1801; 225 years ago
- Location: Brussels, Belgium
- Coordinates: 50°50′30″N 4°21′30″E
- Type: Art museum
- Director: Kim Oosterlinck
- Website: www.fine-arts-museum.be/en

The Royal Museums of Fine Arts of Belgium (French: Musées royaux des Beaux-Arts de Belgique (MRBAB), pronounced [myze ʁwajo de boz‿aʁ də bɛlʒik]; Dutch: Koninklijke Musea voor Schone Kunsten van België (KMSKB), pronounced [ˈkoːnɪŋkləkə myːˈzeːjaː voːr ˈsxoːnə ˈkʏnstə(ɱ) vɑm ˈbɛlɣijə]) are a group of art museums in Brussels, Belgium. They are part of the institutions of the Belgian Federal Science Policy Office (BELSPO) and consist of six museums: the Oldmasters Museum, the Magritte Museum, the Fin-de-Siècle Museum, the Modern Museum, the Wiertz Museum and the Meunier Museum.

The Royal Museums contain over 20,000 drawings, sculptures, and paintings, covering a period extending from the early 15th century to the present, such as those of Flemish old masters like Bruegel, Rogier van der Weyden, Robert Campin, Anthony van Dyck, Jacob Jordaens, and Peter Paul Rubens, making them the most popular art institution and most visited museum complex in Belgium. The Magritte Museum houses the world's largest collection of works by the surrealist artist René Magritte.

== History ==
=== Early history ===
The museum was founded on 1 September 1801 by Napoleon and opened in 1803 as the Museum of Fine Arts of Brussels (French: Musée des Beaux-Arts de Bruxelles, Dutch: Museum voor Schone Kunsten van Brussel), occupying fourteen rooms of the former Palace of Charles of Lorraine, known as the "Old Court". The first collection, the core of the current collections of Ancient Art, consisted of a selection of "old deposits", works of art seized by the French Republic but abandoned (1798), increased by two shipments from Paris (1802 and 1811), and returned works taken away by the Republic (1815). Later, during the Dutch period, King William I of the Netherlands sponsored an expansion of the collection (1817 and 1819) and had two wings built on the current Place du Musée/Museumplein (the Palace of National Industry, opened in 1830).

Following Belgian independence, the museum, which had belonged to the City of Brussels since 1811, was ceded to the Belgian state in 1841. The transfer of the Contemporary Art collection from the Ministry of the Interior in 1834 is at the origin of the Modern Art section. In 1845, it was decided, by royal decree, that the museum was to receive works of art of deceased and living Belgian artists. A national commission was established to select important works of art. The first president of the commission was the Count de Beaufort. Other members were Gustaf Wappers, François-Joseph Navez, Guillaume Geefs, Eugène Simonis, Tilman-François Suys and Luigi Calamatta. Many of these founding members were active in the Royal Academy of Science, Letters and Fine Arts of Belgium.

Until 1878, the Brussels Salon, a periodic exhibition of works by living artists, took place in the former apartments of Charles Alexander of Lorraine. This situation was not ideal because the permanent collection had to be temporarily stored or covered during the exhibition. In addition, the exhibitors complained that all paintings were not lit equally well. Renovation works were carried out so that in 1830 a Grand Gallery could open with a skylight. Nevertheless, low-hanging works were still difficult to see. In 1851, the exhibition was held in a temporary construction in the courtyard, before returning to its traditional location until 1881, when the first rooms of the new Museum of Fine Arts could be used. This museum remained the location for all subsequent editions.

The works of the Old Masters (French: vieux maîtres, Dutch: oude meesters) were finally moved from the Palace of Charles of Lorraine to the Rue de la Régence/Regentschapsstraat in 1887, giving a new purpose to Alphonse Balat's Palace of Fine Arts (French: Palais des Beaux-Arts, Dutch: Paleis voor Schone Kunsten), which had opened in 1880 (not to be confused with the current Centre for Fine Arts).

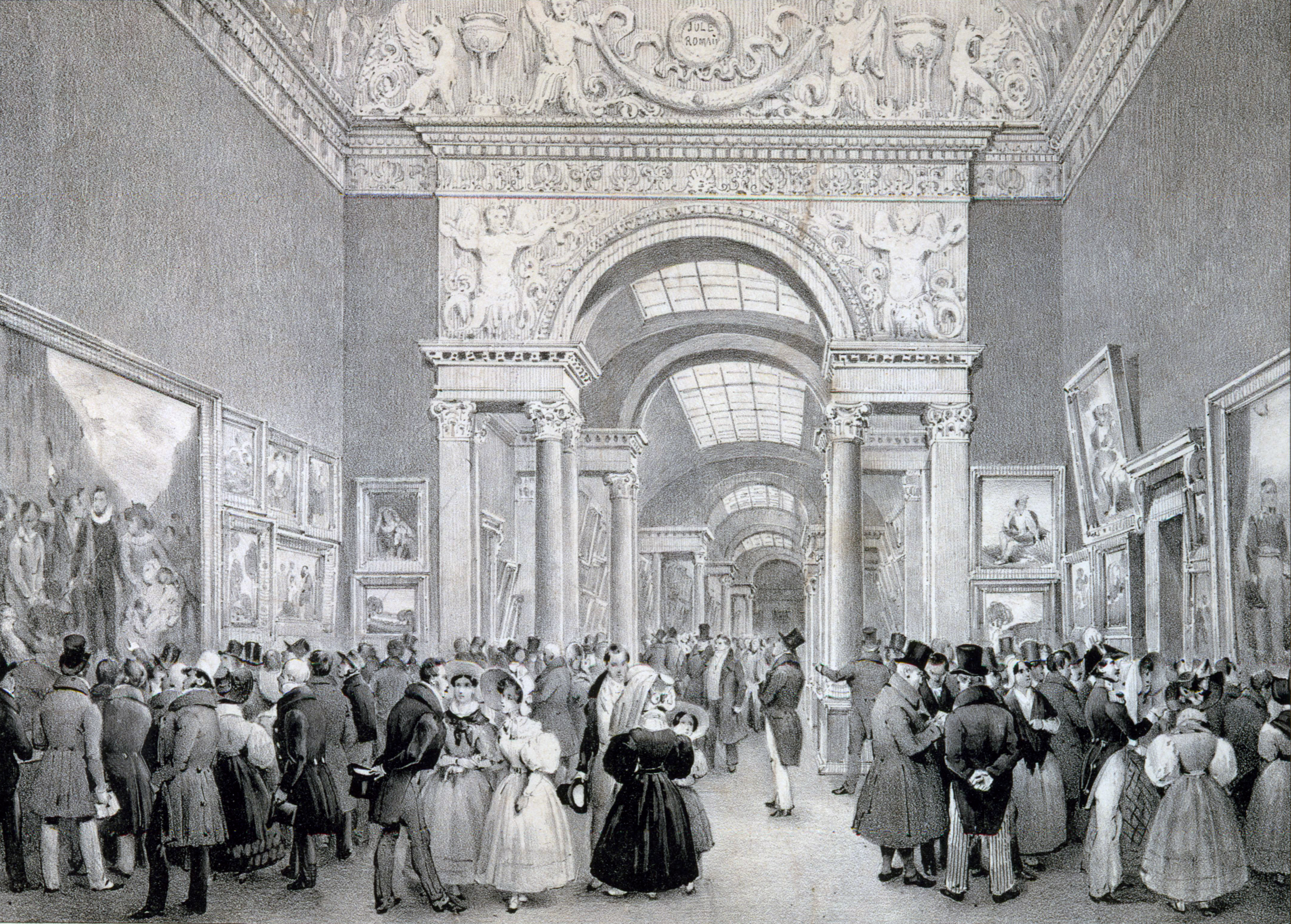
The Brussels Salon of 1830 in the Palace of Charles of Lorraine, rendered by Jean-Baptiste Madou

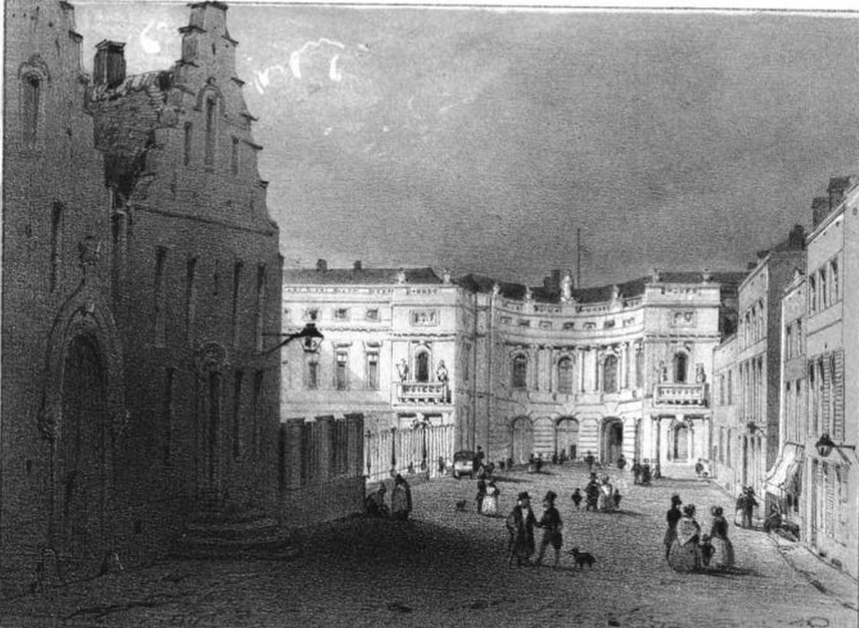
The palace in 1846, illustration from Guide pittoresque dans Bruxelles

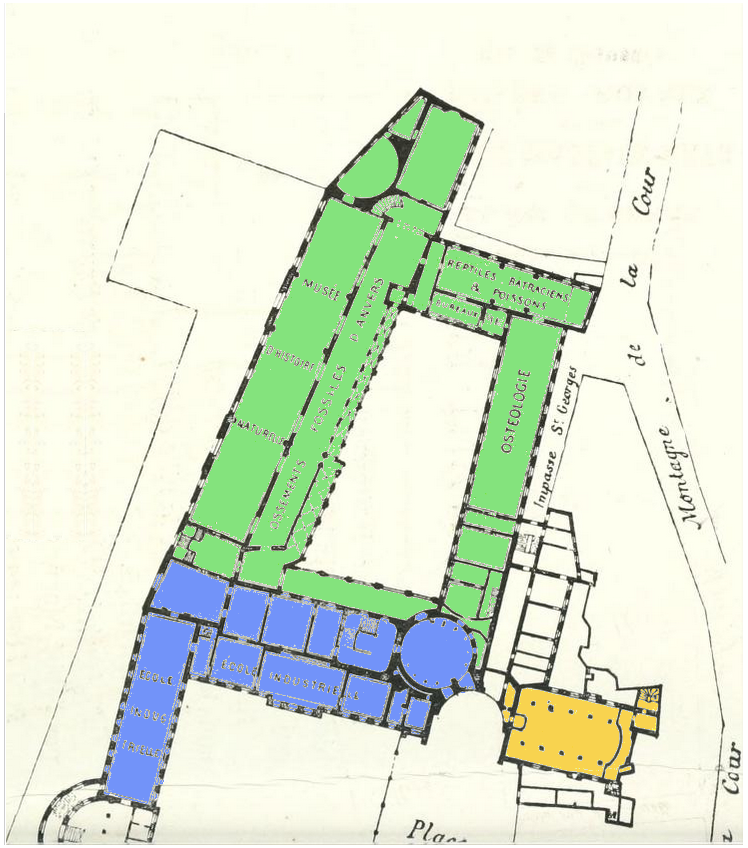
Map of the palace and Museums district in 1880

=== 20th and 21st centuries ===
The museum continued to expand in subsequent years, benefitting from increases through purchases, donations or bequests. In 1914, the De Grez donation enriched the collection with more than 4,000 works dating from the 16th to the 19th centuries, notably by Hendrick Goltzius, Jacob de Gheyn II, and Rembrandt, to name a few. Other important acquisitions included the Delia Faille de Leverghem (1942) donation, as well as the Delporte-Livrauw (1973) and Goldschmidt (1990) bequests. In 1919, the museum changed its name to become the Royal Museum of Fine Arts of Belgium (French: Musée des Beaux-Arts de Belgique, Dutch: Museum voor Schone Kunsten van België). This name was changed again in 1927 to its current name: the Royal Museums of Fine Arts of Belgium (French: Musées royaux des Beaux-Arts de Belgique, Dutch: Koninklijke Musea voor Schone Kunsten van België).

The museum's redevelopment by the architect Albert Van Huffel from 1923 to 1930 allowed a new presentation of the collections. The Museum of Modern Art was closed in 1959 and the "Old Court" was partially demolished in 1960 for the construction of the Royal Library of Belgium (KBR). From 1962 to 1978, the temporary exhibition halls of the five-level neoclassical Hôtel du Lotto (also known as the Hôtel Altenloh), on the Place Royale/Koningsplein, were used. The extension of the Museum of Ancient Art combined with that of the National Archives of Belgium, behind the façades of the former Palace of National Industry, allowed the creation of a new set of rooms and an auditorium. Planned in 1962 by the architects Roland Delers and Jacques Bellemans, it was inaugurated in phases in 1972 and 1974. Towards the Place Royale, the Hôtel Argenteau, the Hôtel Gresham and the Hôtel Altenloh were incorporated in turn in 1965, 1967 and 1969 respectively. An in-depth renovation of Balat's palace was carried out in successive stages from 1977. At the same time, in 1978, the construction of the underground part of the Museum of Modern Art began, with an entrance via the Hôtel Altenloh. The complex was inaugurated in 1984.

In 2004, the museum embarked on a restructuring programme with the aim of making its collections more accessible and reaching a wider audience. The museum's then-curator, Michel Draguet, wished to bring together different collections of federal institutions and set up specific museums that better highlighted a particular sub-collection. In 2009, the Magritte Museum was established for this purpose. In 2013, the Fin-de-Siècle Museum opened in the underground halls, which had housed the Museum of Modern Art since 1984. The closure of the Museum of Modern Art, however, was met with much protest, but this also marked the start of the concretisation of a new international museum for modern and contemporary art at a different location in Brussels. This new museum should be able to open by 2022. The collection would consist of the works of art from the closed museum, from loans of private collectors and from the collections of large banking institutions.

On 10 February 2022, for the first time, the museum restituted a painting to the heirs of a Jewish collector looted by the Nazis. The still life Flowers by Lovis Corinth had belonged to Gustav Mayer and Emma (born Gumprich) Mayer before it was seized.

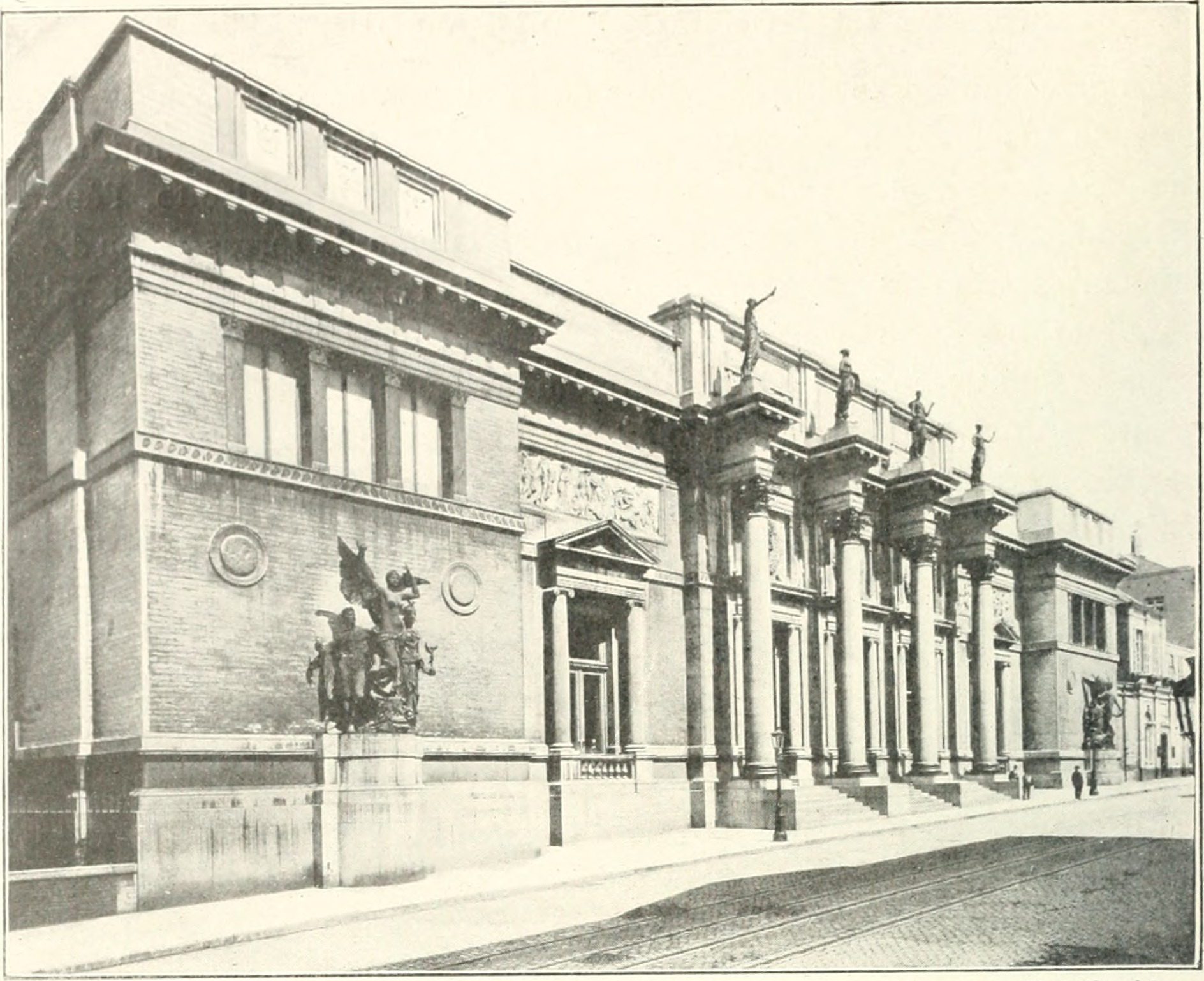
The Palace of Fine Arts, the museum's second (current) location, in 1910

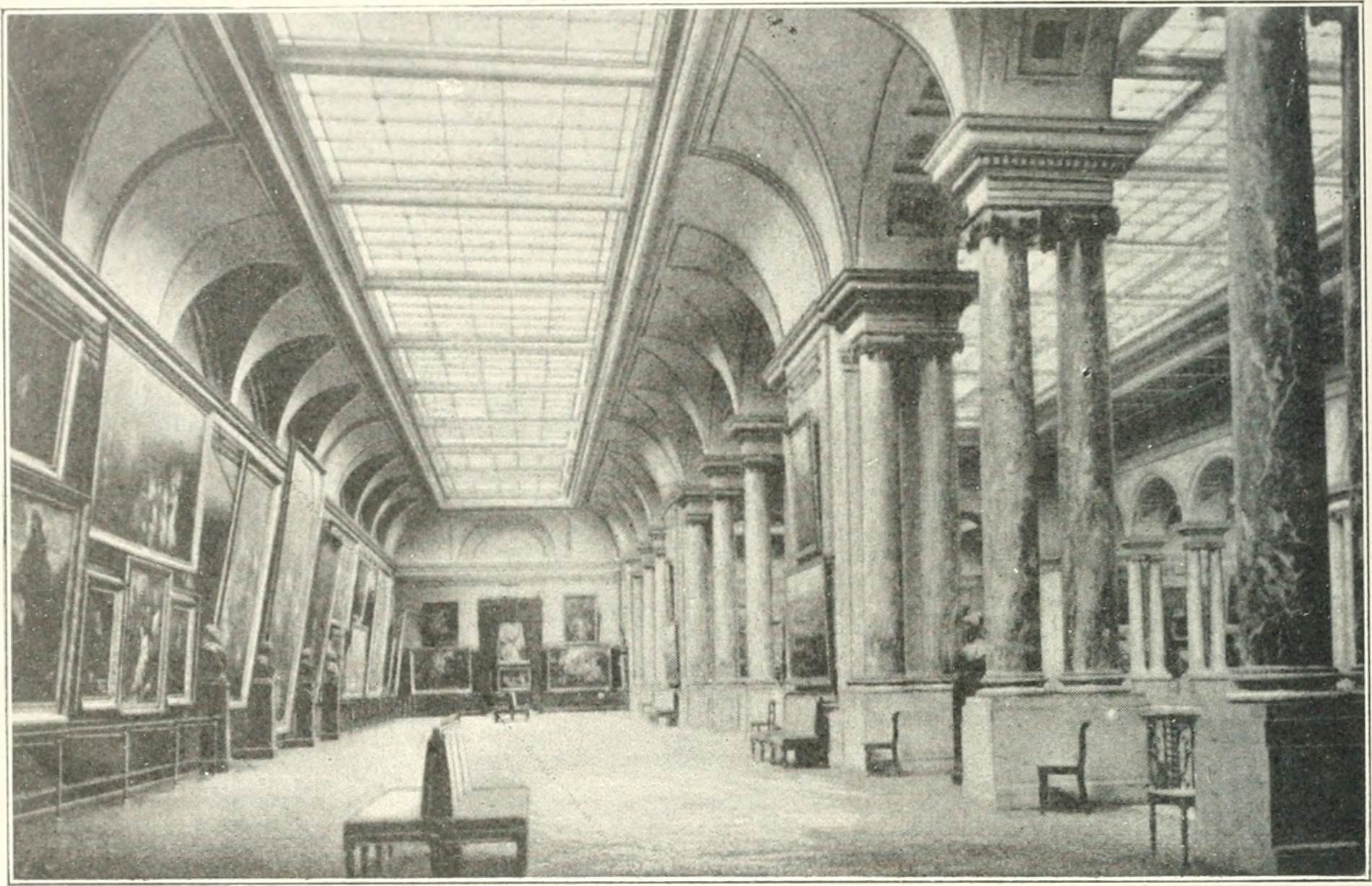
Interior of the Palace of Fine Arts in 1910

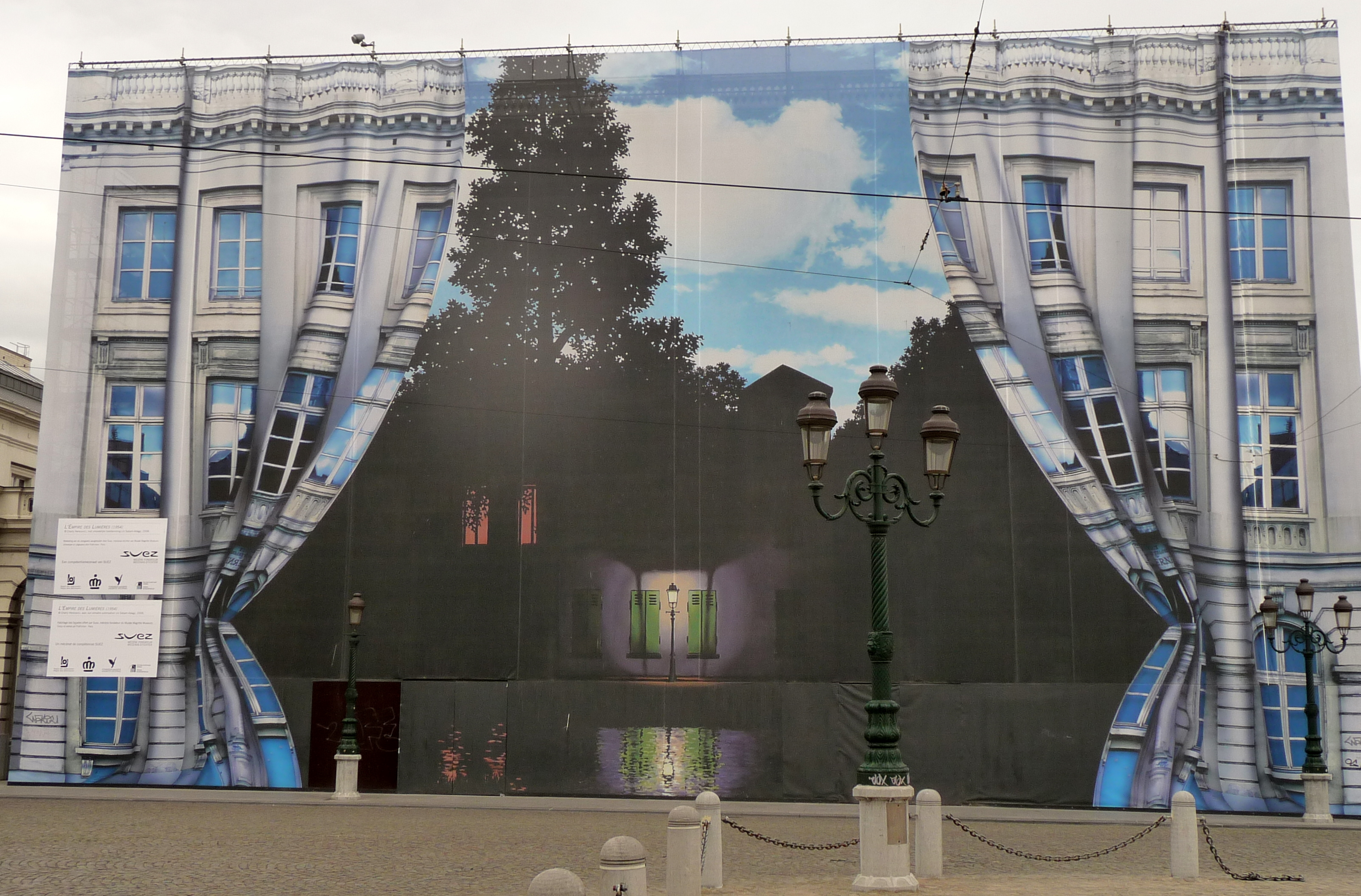
Installation of the Magritte Museum in the Hôtel du Lotto, on the Place Royale/Koningsplein, in 2008

== Museums ==
There are six museums connected with the Royal Museums of Fine Arts of Belgium; two of them are located in the main building: the Oldmasters Museum or Museum of Ancient Art, whose collections cover European art until 1750; and the Museum of Modern Art. These museums are situated in the downtown Royal Quarter, on the Coudenberg, in Brussels. The Magritte Museum, opened in 2009, and Fin-de-Siècle Museum, opened in 2013, are adjacent to the main building. The smaller Meunier Museum and the Wiertz Museum, dedicated to these two Belgian artists, are located a few kilometres from the city centre.

=== Oldmasters Museum ===
The Oldmasters Museum has an extensive collection of European paintings, sculptures and drawings from the 15th to the 18th centuries. The bulk of the collection is formed around Flemish painting, presented in chronological order. For example, there are valuable panels by the Flemish Primitives (including Bruegel, Rogier van der Weyden, Robert Campin (the Master of Flémalle), Hieronymus Bosch, Anthony van Dyck, and Jacob Jordaens). The museum is also proud of its "Rubens Room", which houses more than twenty paintings by the artist. The painting Landscape with the Fall of Icarus, long-attributed to Bruegel, is located there and forms the subject of W. H. Auden's famous poem Musée des Beaux Arts, named after the museum. There are also constant temporary exhibitions.

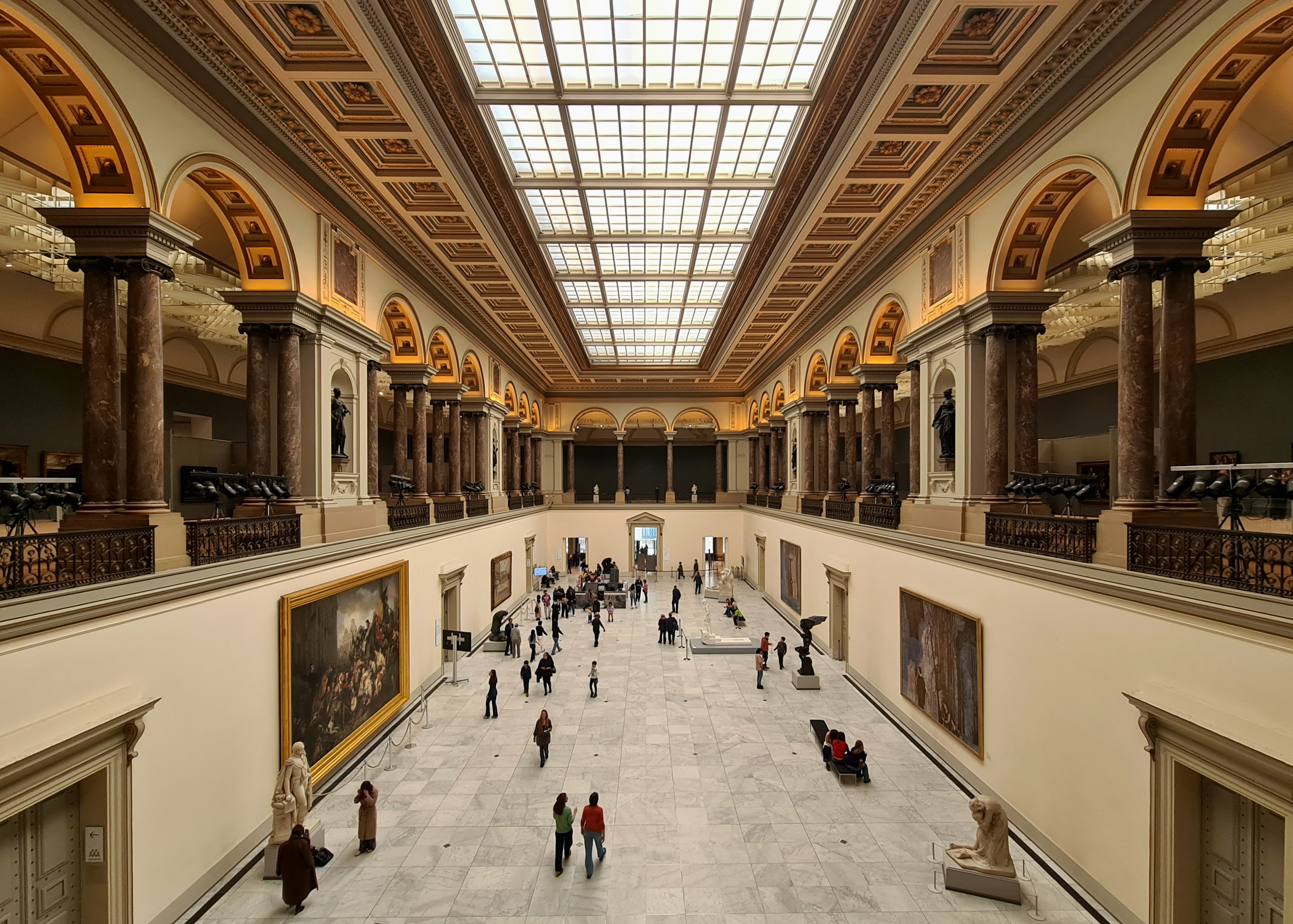
View from the upper floor of the Oldmasters Museum

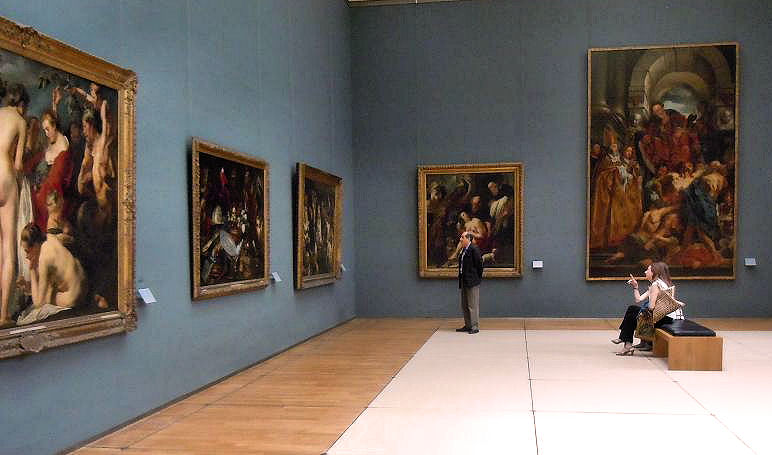
The Jacob Jordaens Room

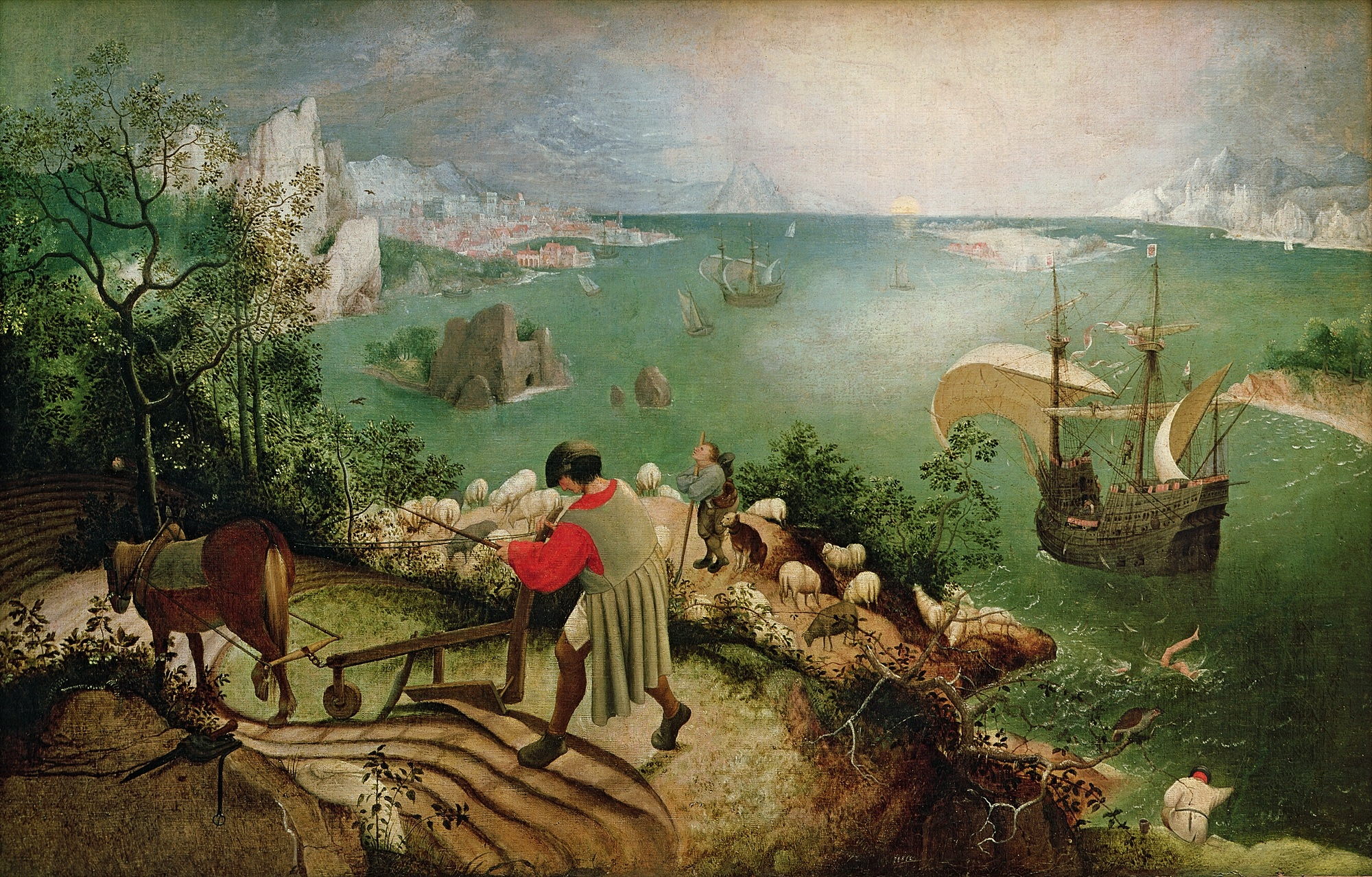
Landscape with the Fall of Icarus, Pieter Bruegel the Elder, c. 1558

=== Magritte Museum ===
The Magritte Museum has one of the richest collections of paintings by the Belgian surrealist artist René Magritte, including some 200 original paintings, drawings and sculptures, such as The Return, Scheherazade and The Empire of Light. The collection is the result of astute purchases and generous donations, mostly coming from the collection of the artist's widow, Georgette Magritte, and from Irene Hamoir Scutenaire, who was his primary collector. Inaugurated on 20 May 2009, the museum opened on 2 June 2009. It is housed in the Hôtel du Lotto, on the Place Royale, a stone's throw away from the Oldmasters Museum.

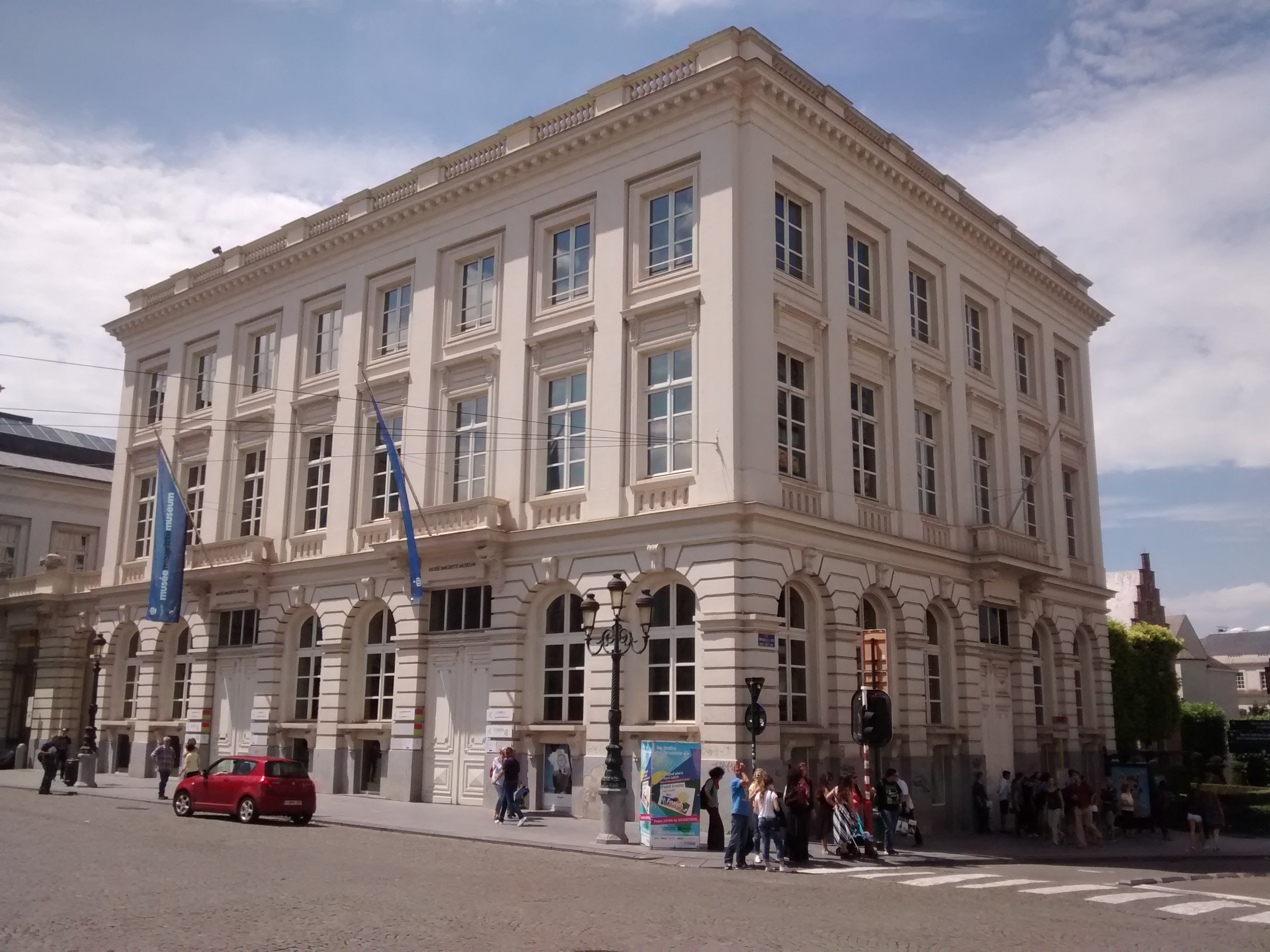
Hôtel du Lotto or Hôtel Altenloh, home of the Magritte Museum

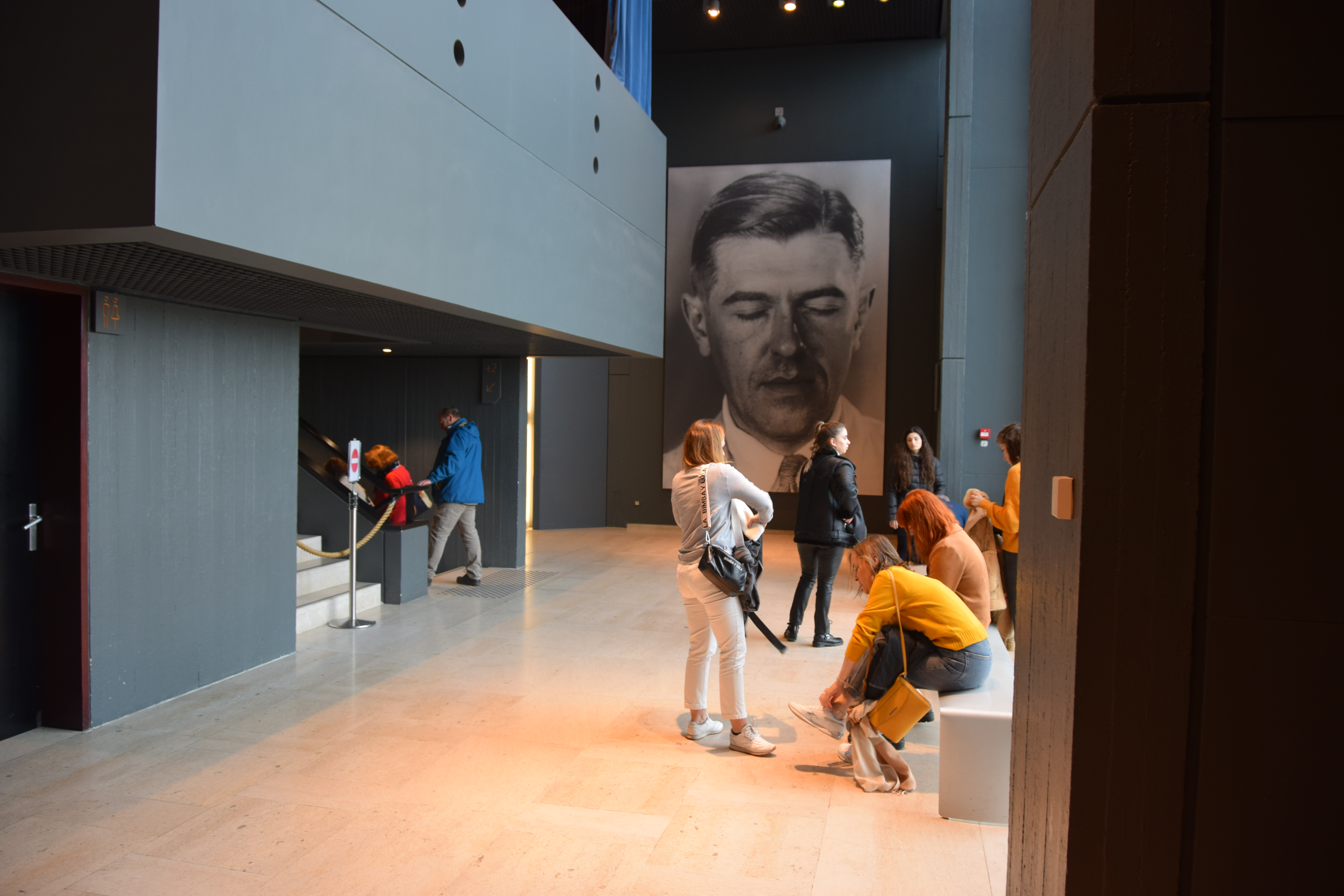
Entrance

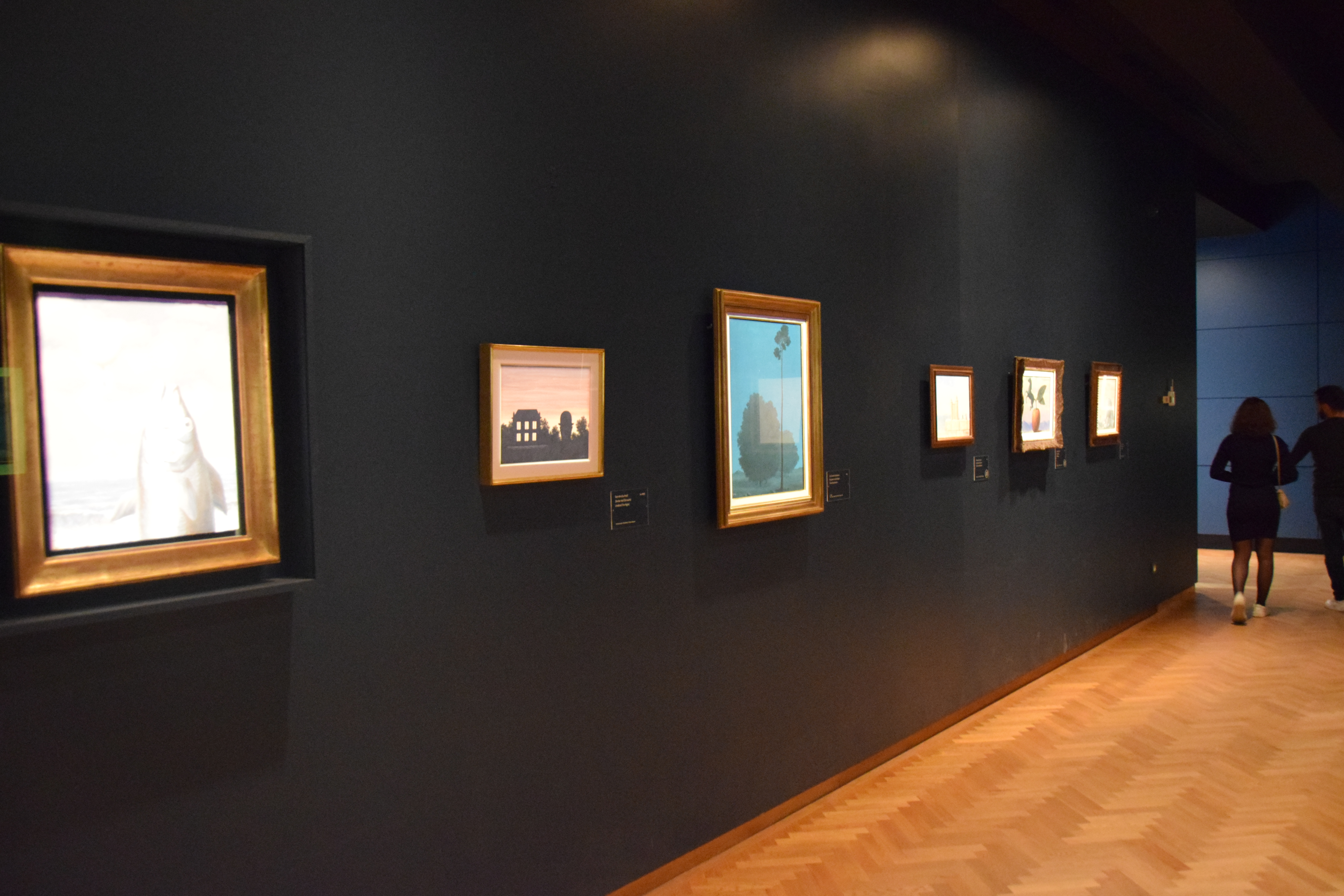
Exhibition space

=== Fin-de-Siècle Museum ===
Inaugurated on 6 December 2013, the Fin-de-Siècle Museum presents collections of works of art from the end of the 19th and the beginning of the 20th century, when Brussels was a unique artistic crossroads and the capital of Art Nouveau. Artists represented in the museum's collection include Constantin Meunier, James Ensor, Henri Evenepoel, Fernand Khnopff, Leon Spilliaert, Jusepe de Ribera, Jacques-Louis David and George Minne. The museum is housed in the Hôtel des Brasseurs or Hôtel Gresham, right next to the Oldmasters Museum, also on the Place Royale.

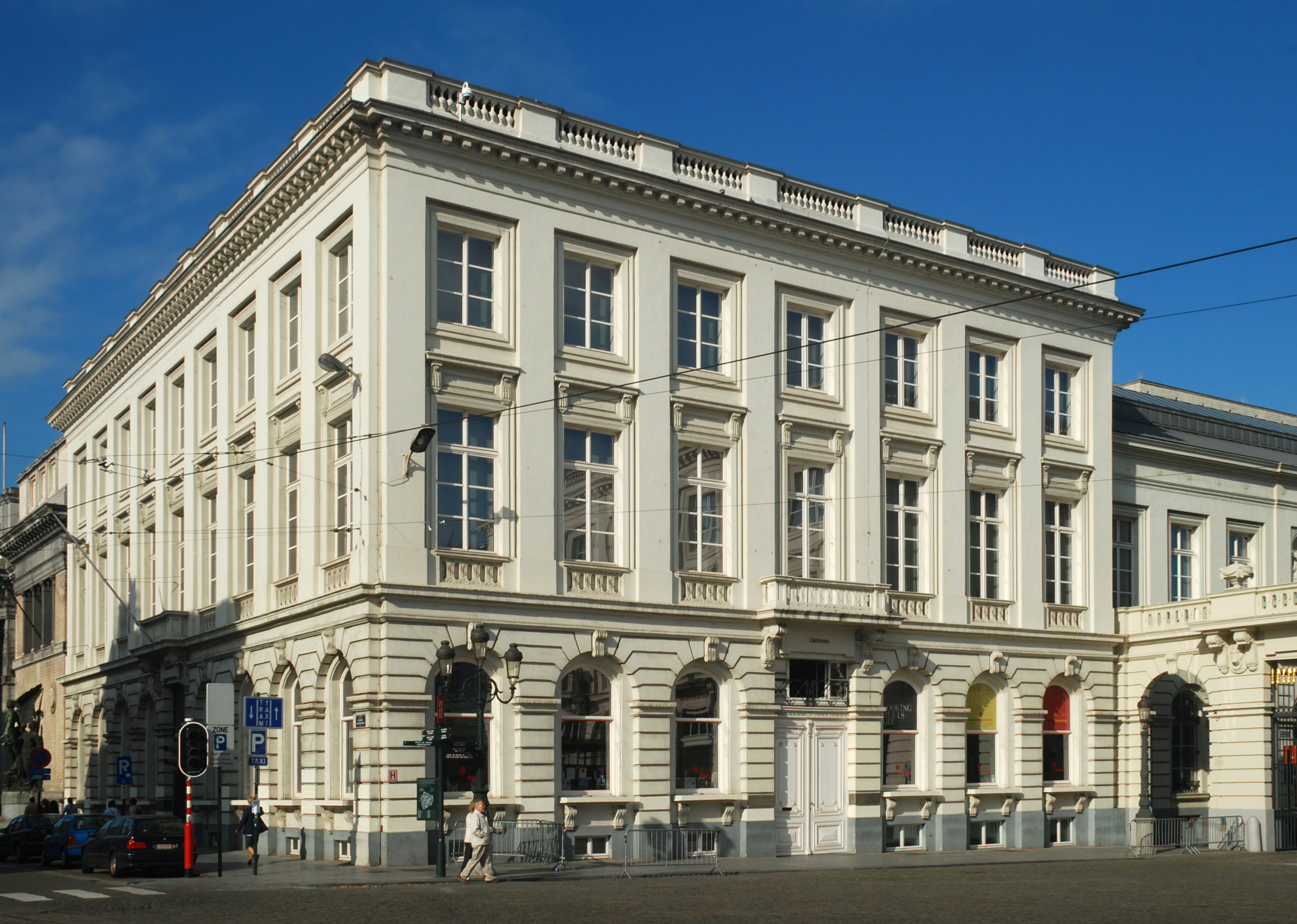
Hôtel des Brasseurs or Hôtel Gresham, home of the Fin-de-Siècle Museum

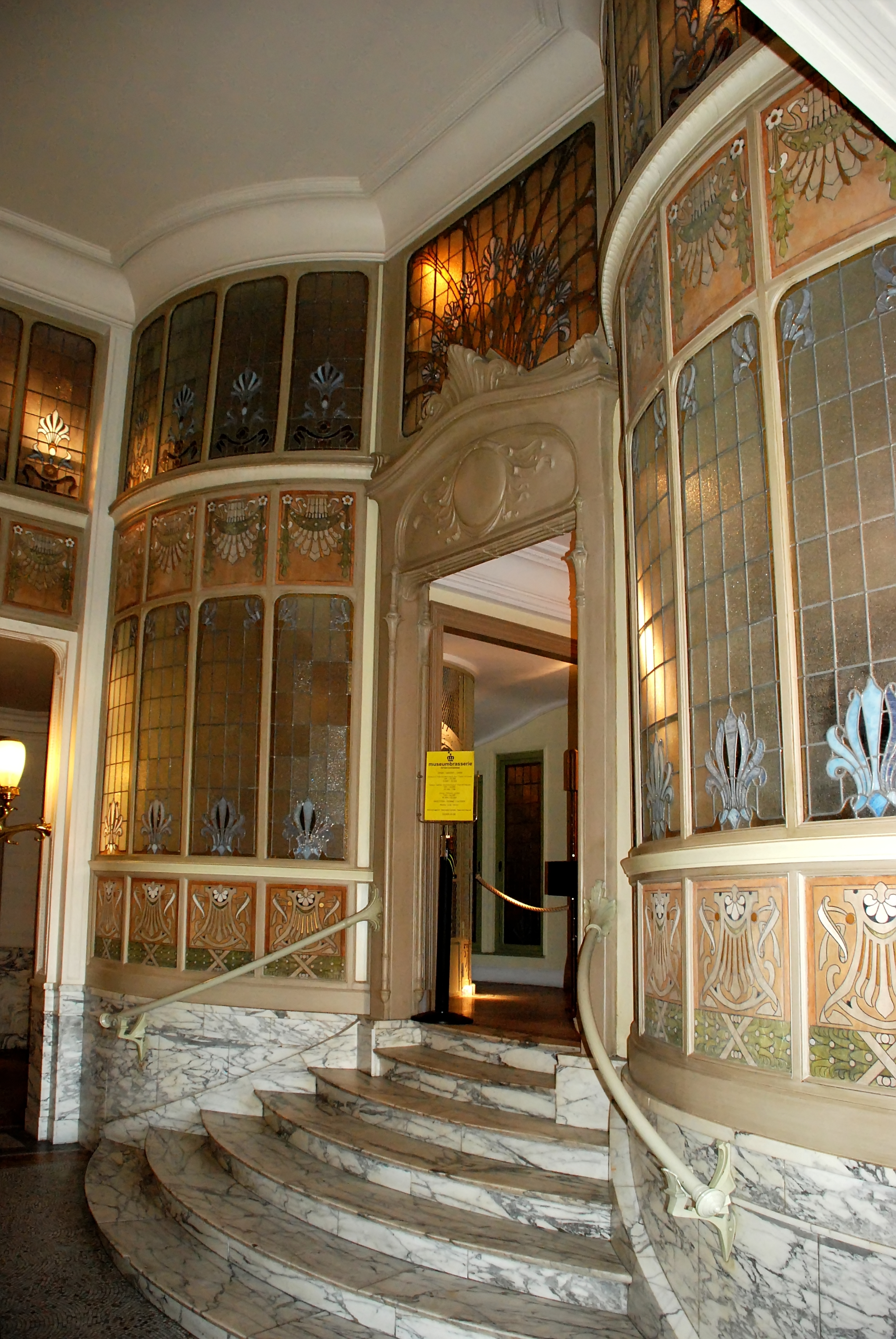
Entrance

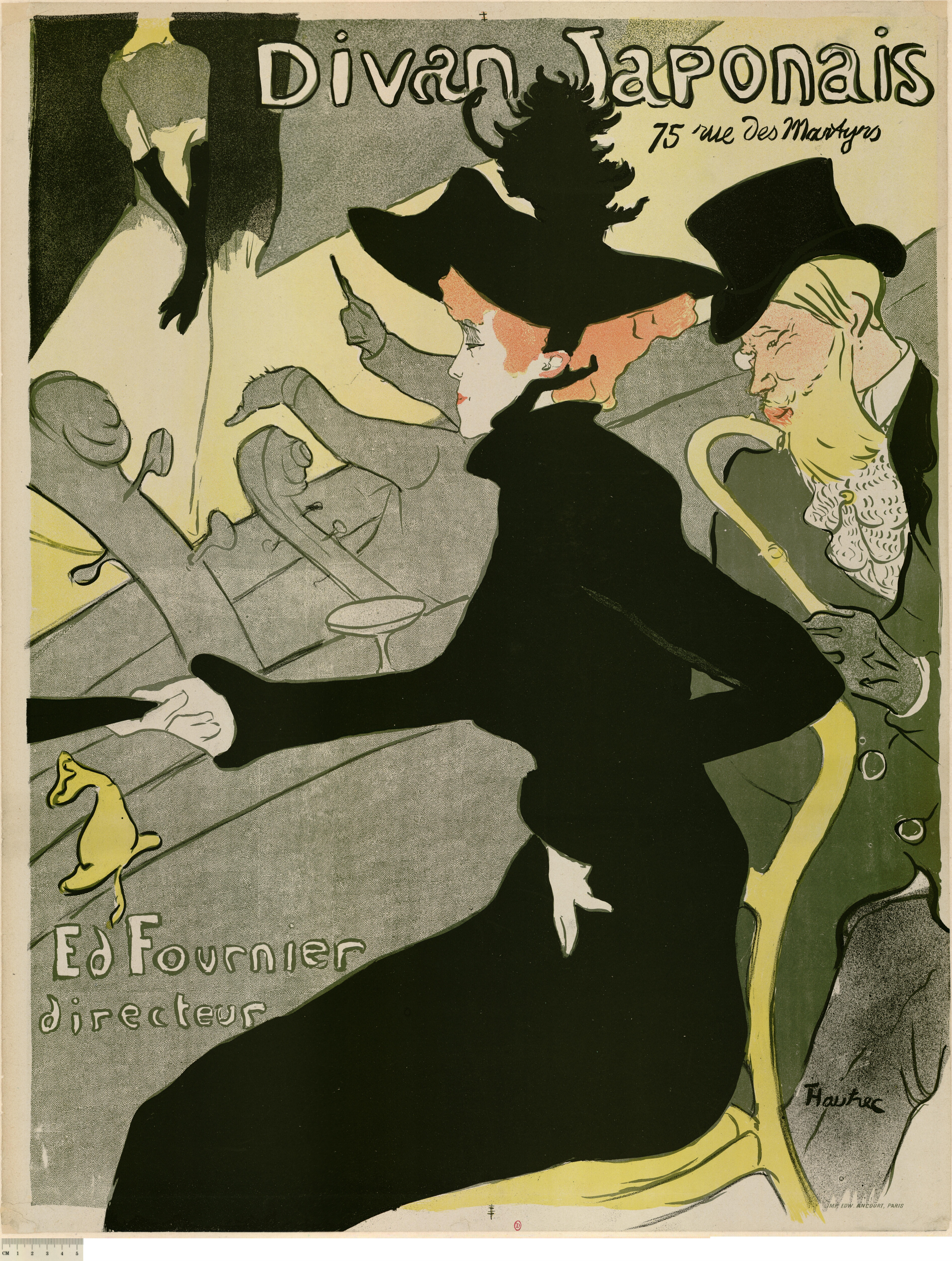
Divan Japonais, Henri de Toulouse-Lautrec, 1893

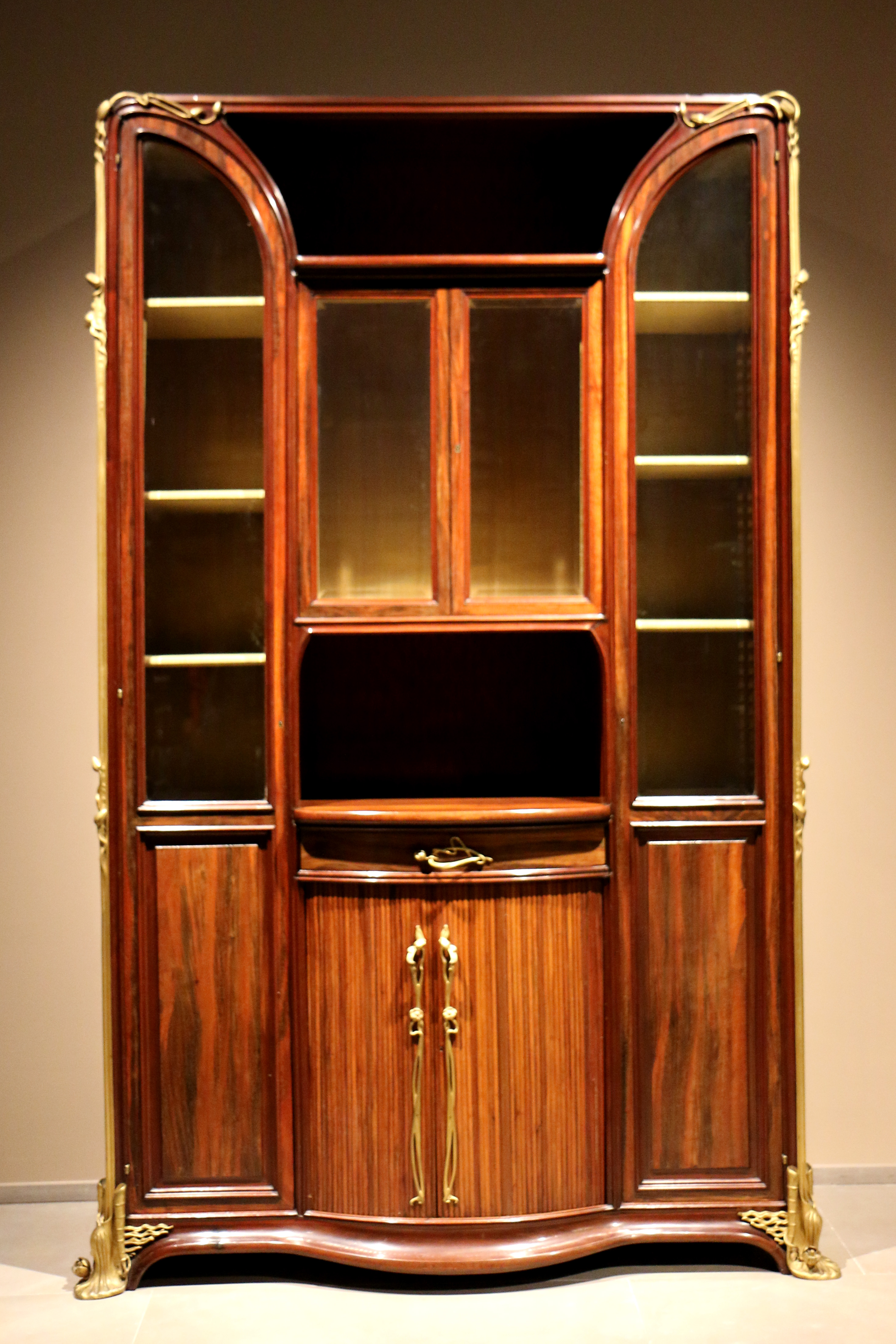
Waterlily bookcase, Louis Majorelle, 1902

=== Wiertz Museum ===
The life and work of Antoine Wiertz are honoured in the artist's former studio at 62, rue Vautier/Vautierstraat in Ixelles, in the heart of the Leopold Quarter, near Brussels-Luxembourg railway station. This museum offers a view of the monumental paintings, statues and sketches marked by the Belgian romantic movement. The construction of this workshop-museum was agreed in 1850 between Wiertz and the Belgian government. During the year following the artist's death, the entire collection of works then in his studio was bequeathed to the Belgian state. Since 1868, the Wiertz Museum has been part of the Royal Museums of Fine Arts of Belgium.

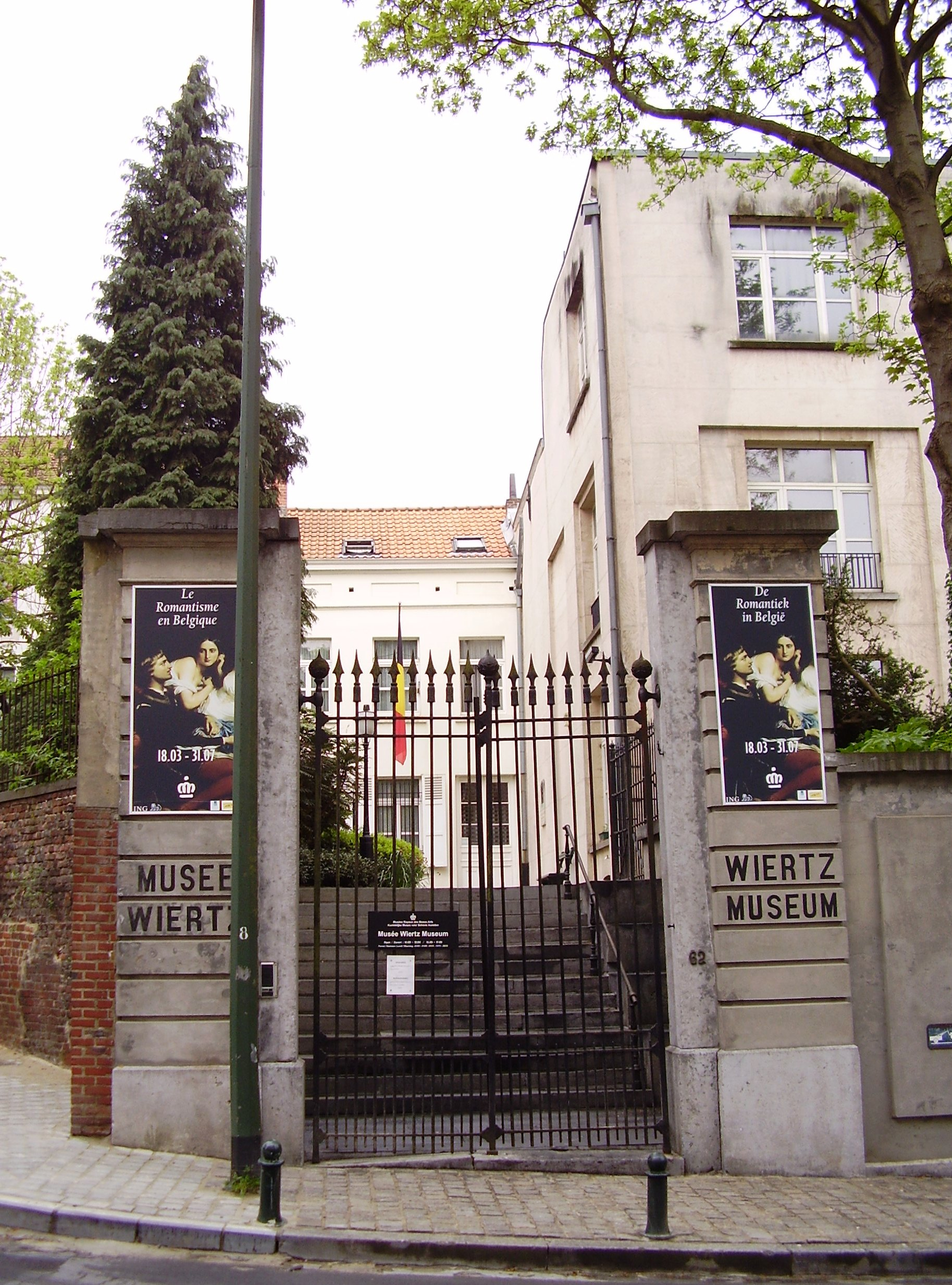
Entrance to the Wiertz Museum

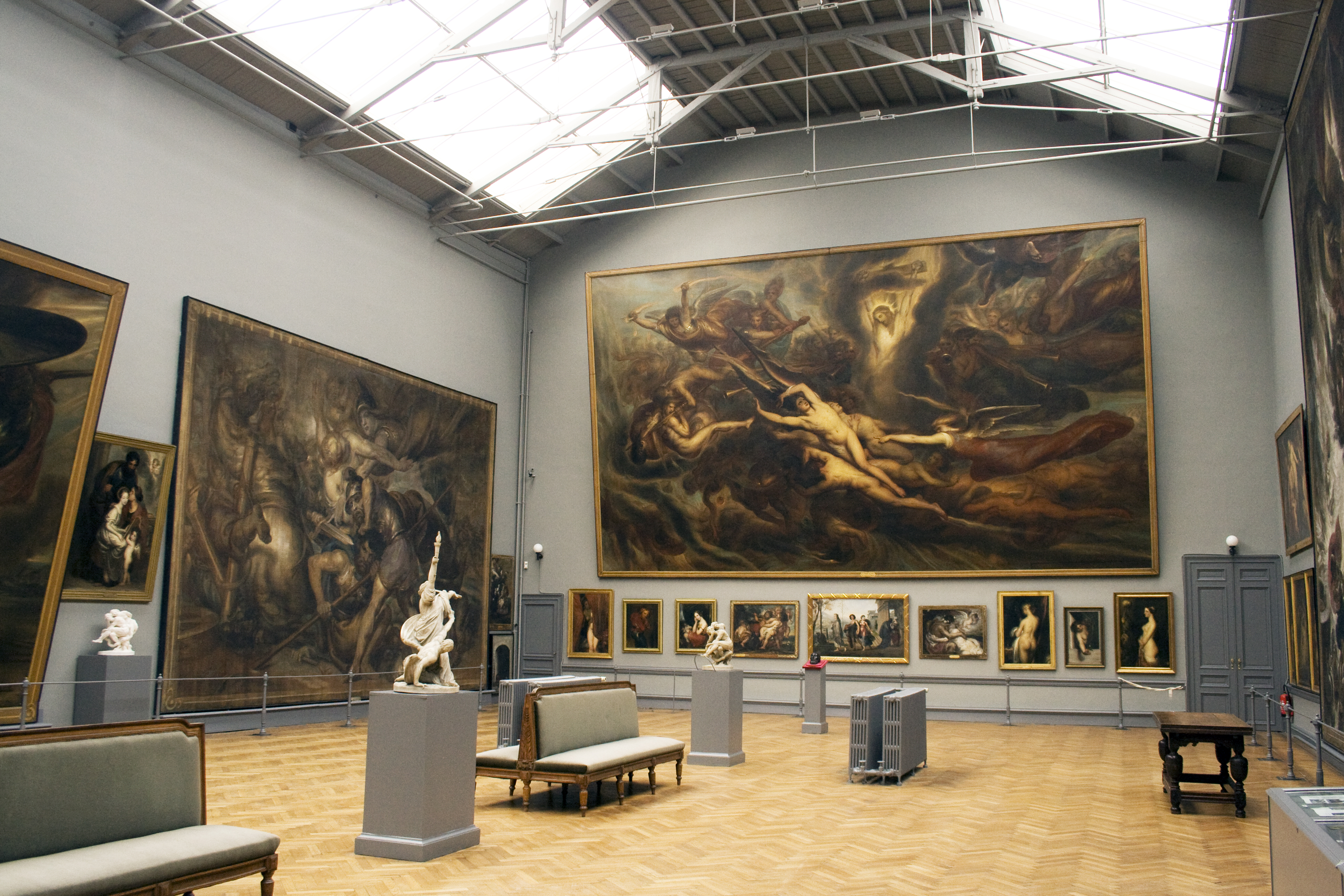
Main hall

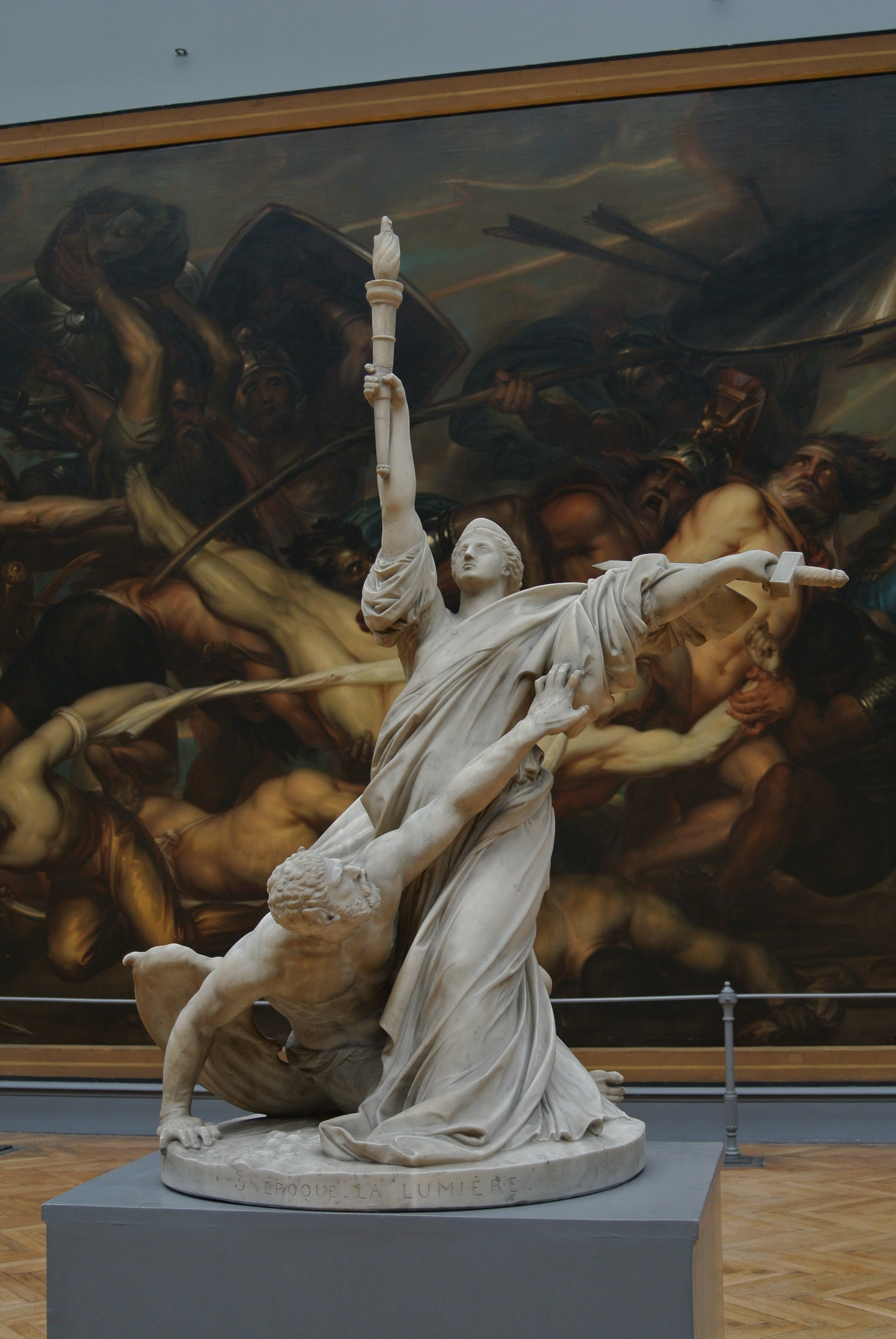
The Triumph of Light, Antoine Wiertz, 1862–1870

=== Meunier Museum ===
Located in Constantin Meunier's former house and workshop at 59, rue de l'Abbaye/Abdijstraat in Ixelles, the Meunier Museum houses 150 works and documents by the realist painter and sculptor. Meunier had the house-studio built towards the end of his life. The house was acquired by the Belgian state in 1936 and opened to the public in 1939. Since 1986, it has been attached to the Royal Museums of Fine Arts of Belgium, and subsequently renovated.

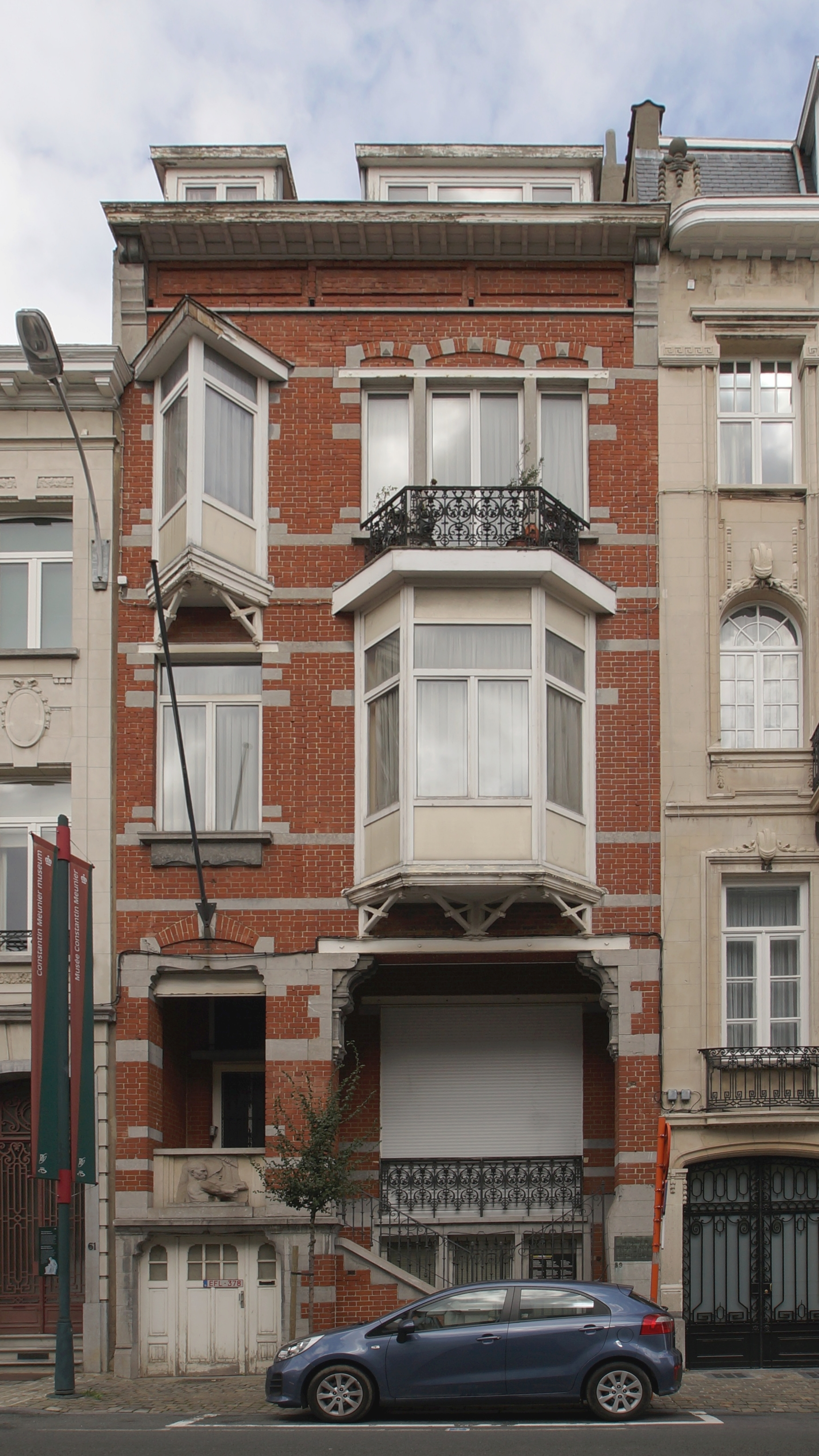
Meunier Museum

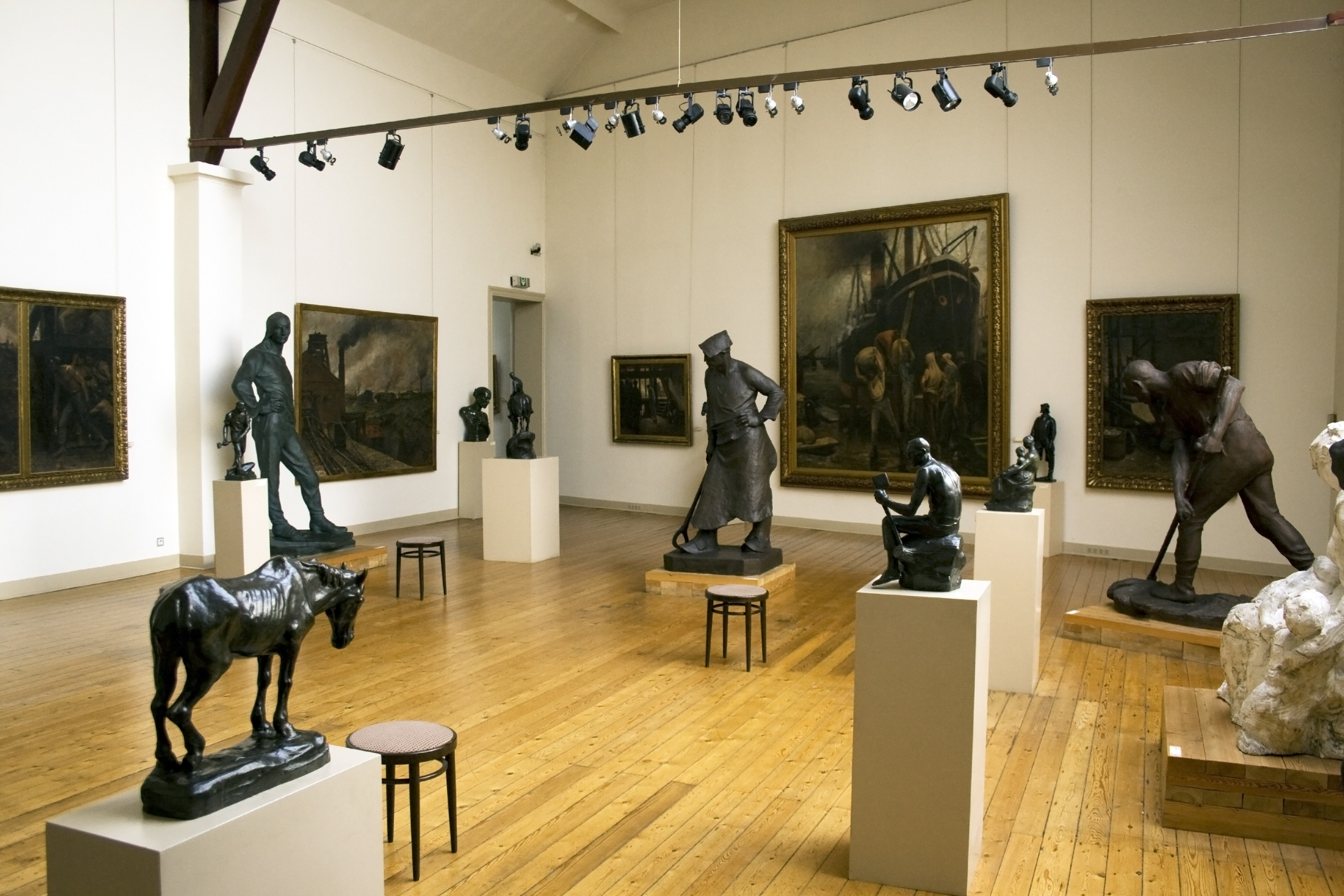
Main hall

== Directors ==
The chief curators or directors of the museum have been:

- 1927–1940: Léo Van Puyvelde
- 1940–1944: Marguerite Devigne
- 1944–1945: Arthur Laes
- 1945–1947: Leo Van Puyvelde
- 1947–1957: Paul Fierens
- 1957–1961: Claire Janson
- 1961–1984: Philippe Roberts-Jones
- 1985–1989: Henri Pauwels
- 1989–2003: Eliane De Wilde
- 2003–2005: Helena Bussers (ad interim)
- 2005–2023: Michel Draguet
- 2023–2024: Sara Lammens (ad interim)
- 2024–ongoing: Kim Oosterlinck

== Visitors ==
The Royal Museums of Fine Arts of Belgium is the most popular art institution in Belgium. The museums had a total of approximately 715,000 visitors in 2010. This puts the museum in the top 100 most visited museums in the world and makes it the most visited museum complex in Belgium. After the opening of the Magritte Museum, the number of unique visitors increased since 2009. In 2015, the Museum had its best attended year so far with a total of 767,355 visitors. The Magritte Museum received about 425,000 visitors in 2010, making it the most successful part of the museums.

This strategy was accompanied by a significant increase in corporate funding. From 2005 until 2017, the number of visitors has doubled and the turnover tripled, thereby reducing the state contribution from 54.4% of the global budget to 32%. This was achieved during a period of very severe budgetary cuts: 11% in 2013 and 2014, 30% for the period 2015–2019.

== See also ==
- Belgian Federal Science Policy Office
- Royal Museums of Art and History
- List of museums in Brussels
- Culture of Belgium
- Belgium in the long nineteenth century
