= André Willequet =

Belgian abstract sculptor

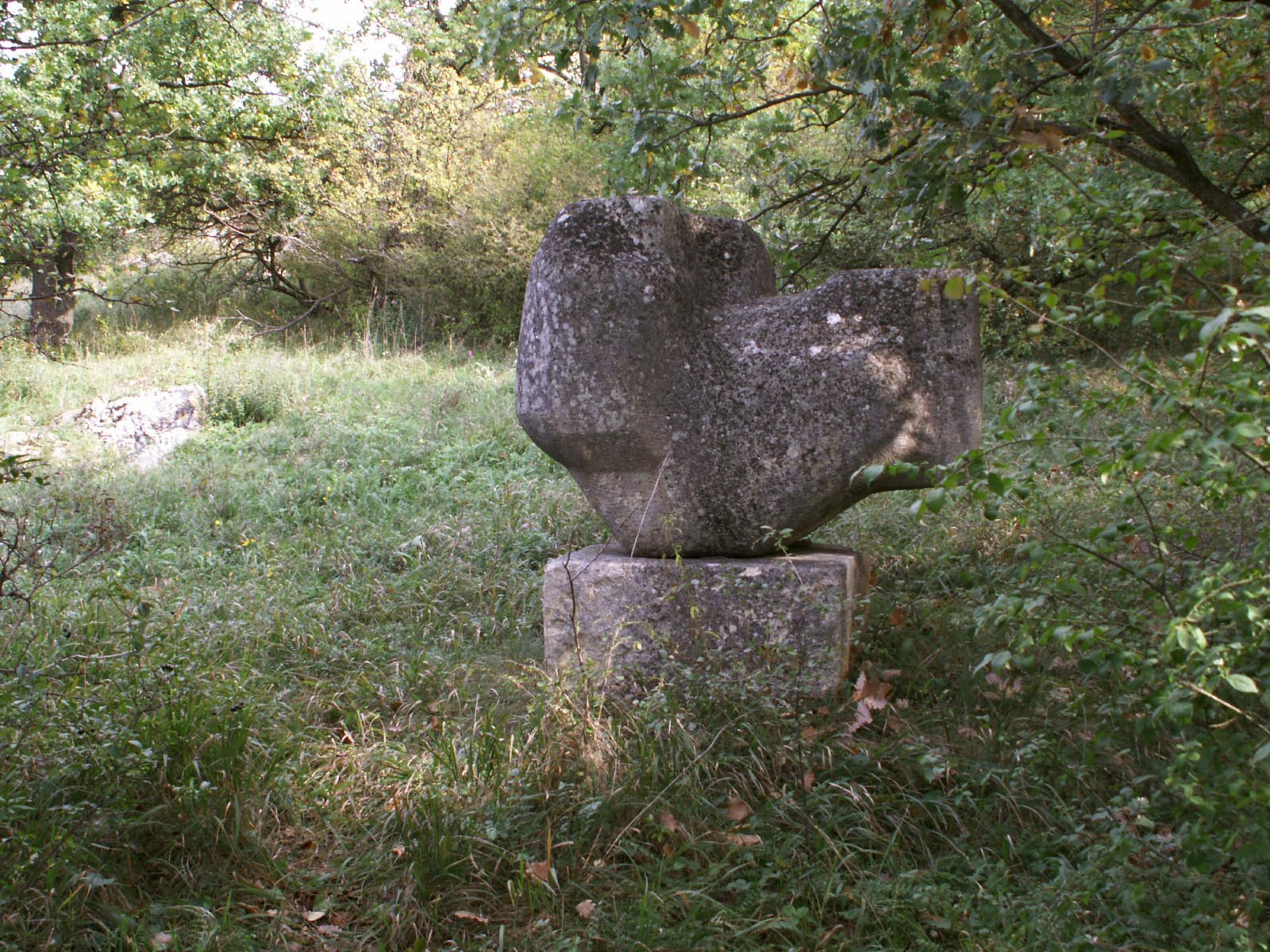
Without title (1959) in Sankt Margarethen im Burgenland, Germany

André Willequet (3 January 1921 – 1 July 1998) was a Belgian abstract sculptor.
