= Philippe Roberts-Jones =

Belgian poet, curator, university professor, historian of modern age and art critic

- Born: 8 November 1924; Ixelles, Belgium
- Died: 9 August 2016 (aged 91); Uccle, Belgium

Baron Philippe Roberts-Jones (8 November 1924 – 9 August 2016) was a Belgian art historian who was the head of conservation of the Royal Museums of Fine Arts of Belgium. A member of the Royal Academy of Science, Letters and Fine Arts of Belgium, of which he was president in 1980, he was also a member of the Free Academy of Belgium and a professor at the Université libre de Bruxelles. He was also a published poet.

== Biography ==
Born in Ixelles, Belgium, on 8 November 1924, Philippe Roberts-Jones belonged to a family of three generations of lawyers, descending from a British family established in Brussels at the beginning of the 19th century and that had been active in the coachwork industry.

His father Robert Roberts-Jones (1893–1943), a lawyer, was a member of the Belgian Resistance and was executed by the Germans at the Tir national on 20 October 1943.

Philippe Roberts-Jones died on 9 August 2016 at the age of 91.

== Prizes ==
- Prix Émile Polak from the Belgian Royal Academy of French Language and Literature, 1957, for Amour et autres visages
- Prix Malherbe of the Province of Brabant, 1976, for L'Art Majeur
- Prix du rayonnement de la langue française, from the Académie française, 1980, for his collected output
- Grand prix de poésie de l'Académie française, 1985
- Prix Louis-Guillaume for prose poetry, 2002, for Domaines en cours
- Grand prix international Lucian Blaga, 2006

== Distinctions ==
Robert-Jones was made a Baron by King Baudouin in 1988.

Belgium

- Grand Cross of the Order of the Crown
- Grand Officer of the Order of Leopold
- Volunteers' Medal for War
- Commemorative Medal of the 1940–1945 War, with sabres
- Civic Medal, first class

France

- Commandeur of the Légion d'honneur
- Commandeur of the ordre des Arts et des Lettres

Spain

- Commander of the Order of Isabella the Catholic

Italy

- Commander of the Order of Merit of the Republic of Italy

Finland

- Grand Officer of the Order of the Lion of Finland

== Work ==
As a poet he publishes under the name Philippe Jones. Among his published works are:

- Le Voyageur de la nuit
- Amours et autres visages
- Être selon
- Racine ouverte
- Un espace renoué

As an art historian, he was interested in the work of Honoré Daumier and in contemporary engraving; another field of interest of his was the work of Belgian painter Lismonde.

== Bibliography ==
- 1973: L'Intermédiaire des généalogistes, "De belgis illustribus. Les quartiers d'ascendance de Philippe Roberts-Jones", n° 167, 1973, p. 328-332. (by Denise Lelarge, Suzanne Roberts-Jones-Goemaere, Estelle van Win, Marcel Bergé, J. Fobe and L. Poplemont)
- 1981: Paul Legrain, Dictionnaire des Belges, Bruxelles, 1981
- 2010: Karel Logist, "En poésie avec Dr Roberts et Mr Jones", dans Le Carnet et les Instants, n° 160, Brussels, February/March 2010, p. 19-20
