= Magritte Museum =

Art museum in Brussels, Belgium

- Musée Magritte (French); Magritte Museum (Dutch)
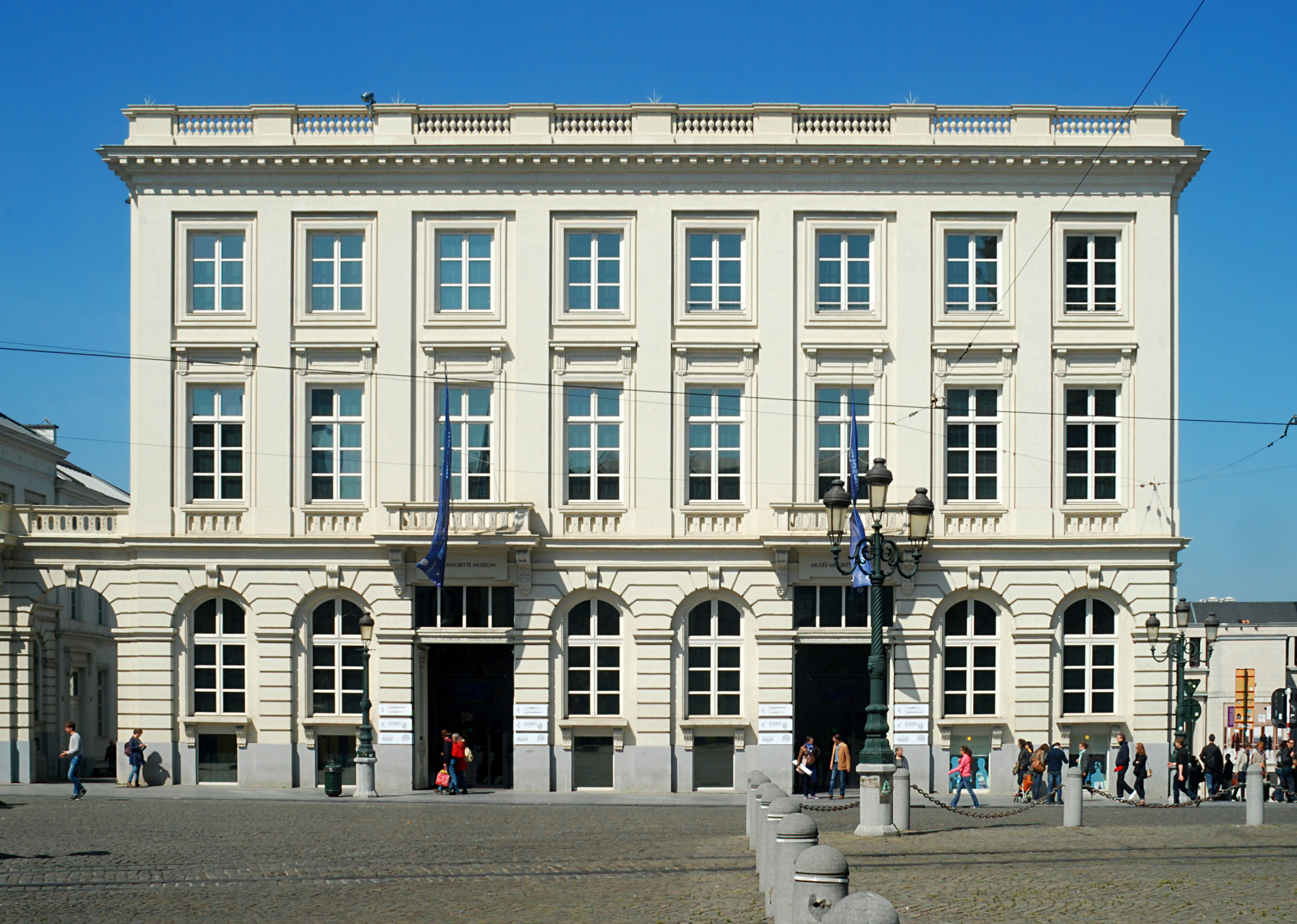
- Hôtel du Lotto, home of the Magritte Museum
- Interactive fullscreen map
- Established: 2009; 17 years ago
- Location: Place Royale / Koningsplein 1, 1000 City of Brussels, Brussels-Capital Region, Belgium
- Coordinates: 50°50′31″N 4°21′31″E
- Type: Art museum
- Public transit access: Brussels-Central; 1 5 Parc/Park and 2 6 Trône/Troon
- Website: www.musee-magritte-museum.be/en

The Magritte Museum (French: Musée Magritte; Dutch: Magritte Museum) is an art museum in the Royal Quarter of Brussels, Belgium, dedicated to the work of the surrealist artist René Magritte. It is one of the constituent museums of the Royal Museums of Fine Arts of Belgium.

The museum is housed in the Hôtel du Lotto, an 18th-century neoclassical building on the Place Royale/Koningsplein, across the street from the Musical Instruments Museum (MIM) and not far from the Royal Palace of Brussels.

== History ==
The Magritte Museum is housed in the Hôtel du Lotto (also known as the Hôtel Altenloh), a five-level hôtel particulier (townhouse) dating from the late 18th century. This neoclassical building formed part of an architectural complex built after the Palace of Coudenberg burned down in 1731. Over the centuries, successive owners have transformed it into a hotel, a jewellery store and finally a museum.

The Place Royale/Koningsplein and its surrounding buildings were a site of fighting during the Belgian Revolution. It was there that the coronation ceremony of Prince Leopold of Saxe-Coburg, King of the Belgians, took place on 21 July 1831. The building then became a hotel for travellers for over a century, before being sold to a jeweller at the beginning of the 20th century.

In 1951, the façades and porticoes lining the Place Royale were recognised for their architectural and historical interest, and were definitively protected from any modification by a classification order on the Belgian Heritage List. The Royal Museums of Fine Arts of Belgium moved in during 1962, and the Hôtel du Lotto was transformed into a museum. Extensive renovation work was carried out in the 1980s, and the building's interior was radically transformed.

The importance of René Magritte's collection and his international renown merited a space dedicated to communicating the artist and his work. In 2007, plans were drawn up for a future Magritte Museum in the Hôtel du Lotto, and work began the following year, with completion scheduled for 2009. Inaugurated on 20 May 2009, the Magritte Museum opened its doors to the public on 2 June 2009, in a 2,500 m^{2} (27,000 sq ft) building belonging to the Royal Museums of Fine Arts.

== Collection ==
The Magritte Museum displays some 200 original Magritte paintings, drawings and sculptures, including The Return, Scheherazade and The Empire of Light. This multidisciplinary permanent installation is the biggest Magritte archive anywhere. The works on display come mainly from donations and the bequests of the artist's widow, Georgette Magritte, and from Irène Hamoir Scutenaire (over twenty paintings, twenty gouaches, forty drawings, etc.), who was his primary collector. Additionally, the museum includes Magritte's experiments with photography from 1920 on and the short surrealist films he made from 1956 on.

== See also ==
- BELvue Museum
- List of museums in Brussels
- List of single-artist museums
- History of Brussels
- Culture of Belgium
- Belgium in the long nineteenth century
