= The Sower =

The Sower may refer to:

== Film ==
- The Sowers, a 1916 silent film directed by William C. deMille
- The Sower (2013 film), a Canadian documentary film directed by Julie Perron
- The Sower (2017 film), a French drama film directed by Marine Francen

== Painting and sculpture ==
- The Sower (Bohland), a 1952 sculpture by Gustav Bohland
- The Sower (Grohar), a 1907 painting by Ivan Grohar
- The Sower (Meunier), an 1896 sculpture by Constantin Meunier
- The Sower (Millet), an 1850 painting by Jean-François Millet
- The Sower (study), part of a series of paintings by Vincent van Gogh between 1881 and 1885
- The Sower is a 19ft. tall bronze sculpture located atop the Nebraska State Capitol in Lincoln, Nebraska, USA

== Other uses ==
- The Sower (novel), a 2009 novel by Kemble Scott
- Parable of the Sower, a parable of Jesus found in the gospels
- Parable of the Sower (novel), a 1993 novel by Octavia E. Butler
