= Kawaguchiko Museum of Art =

- 河口湖美術館
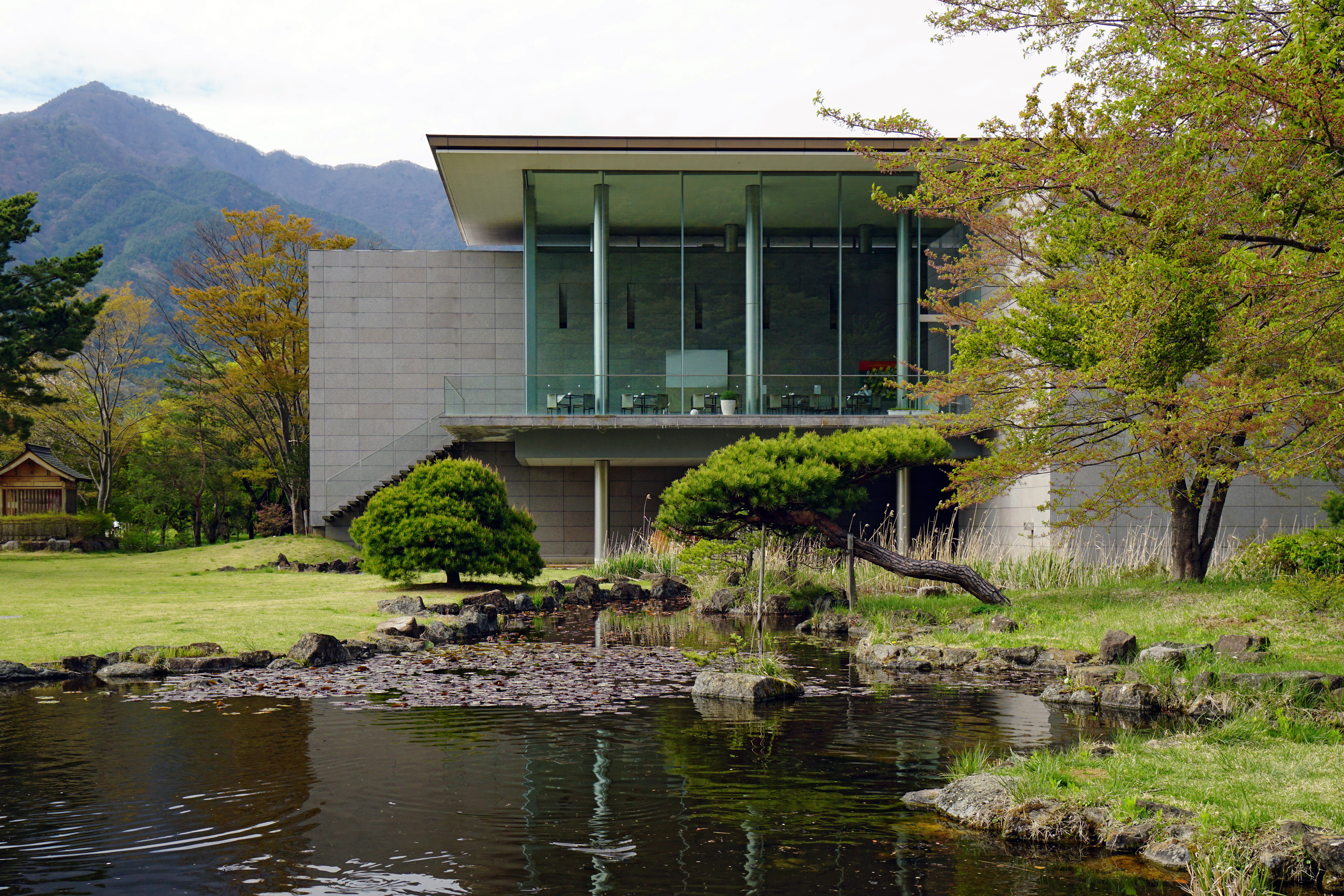

General information
- Location: 3170 Kawaguchi, Fujikawaguchiko, Yamanashi Prefecture, Japan
- Coordinates: 35°31′09″N 138°46′14″E
- Opened: 14 April 1991

Website
- Official website (ja)

Kawaguchiko Museum of Art (河口湖美術館, Kawaguchiko Bijutsukan) is an art museum that opened on the shore of Lake Kawaguchi in Fujikawaguchiko, Yamanashi Prefecture, Japan in 1991. The collection comprises paintings, prints, and photographs of Mount Fuji.

== See also ==
- Yamanashi Prefectural Art Museum
- Fuji-Hakone-Izu National Park
- Fuji Five Lakes
