= Constantin Meunier =

Belgian painter and sculptor

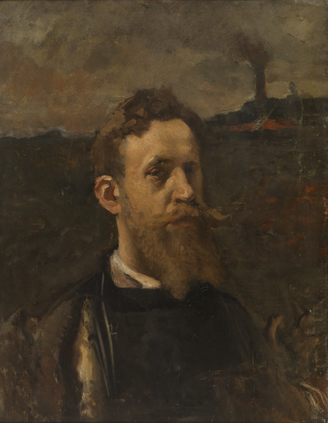
- Self-portrait, 1885
- Born: 12 April 1831; Etterbeek, Belgium
- Died: 4 April 1905 (aged 73); Ixelles, Belgium
- Occupations: Painter, sculptor

Constantin Meunier (French pronunciation: [kɔ̃stɑ̃tɛ̃ mønje]; 12 April 1831 – 4 April 1905) was an influential Belgian painter and sculptor who is best known for his realist depictions of agricultural labourers, metalworkers, dockers, and coal miners, especially from the 1880s and 1890s.

== Early life and education ==
Constantin Meunier was born in the traditionally working-class area of Etterbeek on the outskirts of the city of Brussels. His family was poor and suffered from the economic hardship following the Belgian Revolution (1830) which took place the year before Meunier's birth. Meunier's father committed suicide when he was just four years old.

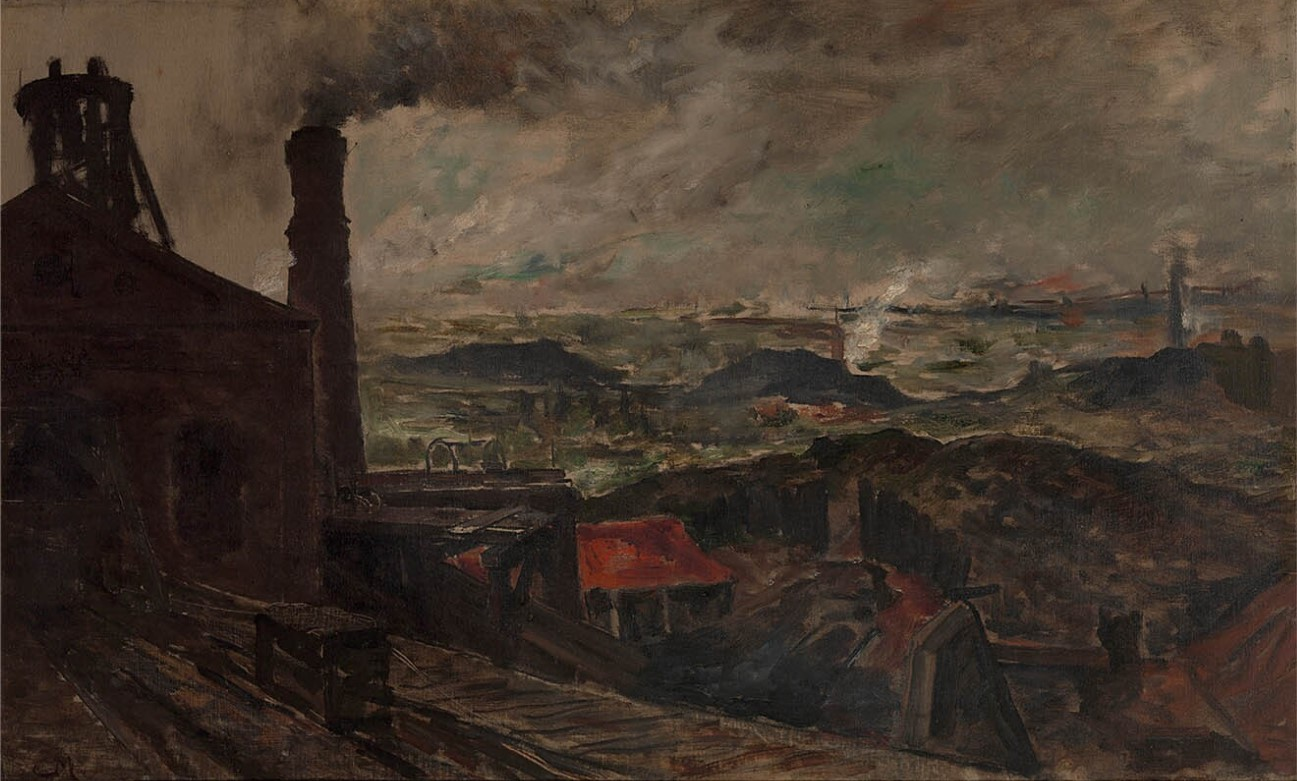
Mining region

Meunier began studying sculpture at the age of 14 at the Academy of Fine Arts in Brussels in September 1845. He studied under the sculptor Louis Jehotte (1804–84) from 1848. He also attended from 1852 the private studio of the sculptor Charles-Auguste Fraikin. While he encountered modest success as a sculptor, his encounter with Gustave Courbet's social realist painting The Stone Breakers in 1851 caused him to doubt the ability of sculpture to adequately represent the contemporary social and artistic issues that were of concern to him. He therefore gave up sculpture in favour of painting which he practiced almost exclusively for the next thirty years.

== Career ==
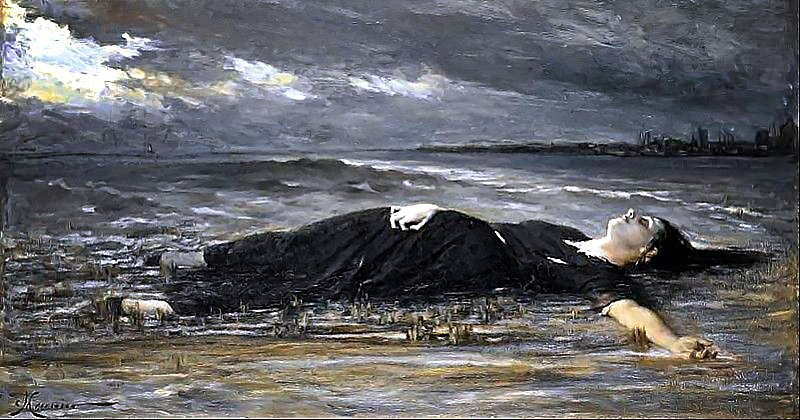
Ophelia

Meunier's first exhibit was a plaster sketch, The Garland, shown at the Brussels Salon in 1851. His first important painting, The Salle St Roch (1857), was followed by a series of paintings including A Trappist Funeral (1860), Trappists Ploughing (1863), in collaboration with Alfred Verwee, Divine Service at the Monastery of La Trappe (1871) and episodes of the German Peasants' War (1878), as well as of Belgium's own historical Peasants' War.

About 1880 Meunier was commissioned to illustrate those parts of Camille Lemonnier's description of Belgium in Le Tour du monde which referred to miners and factory-workers, and produced In the Factory, Smithery at Cockerill's, Melting Steel at the Factory at Seraing (1882), Returning from the Pit, and The Broken Crucible (1884).

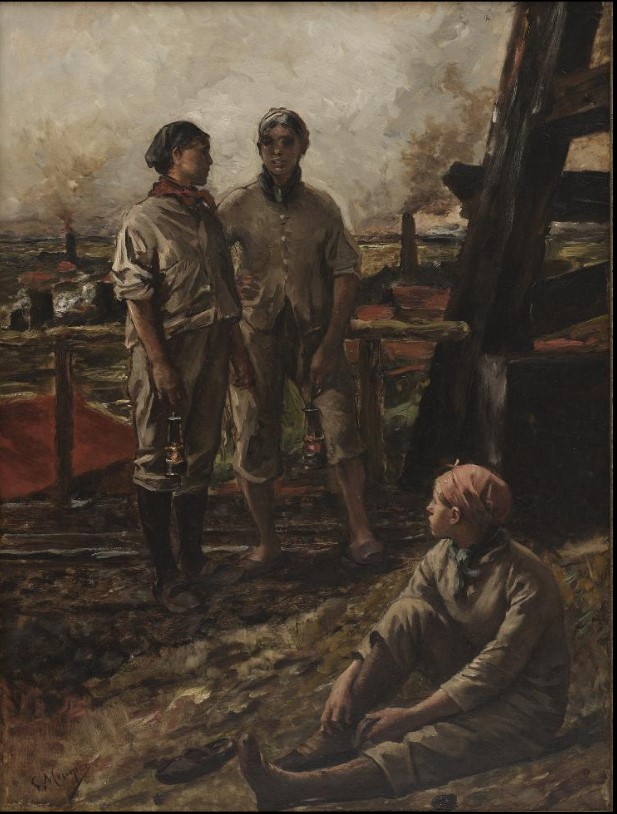
Three female miners

In 1882 he was employed by the government to copy Pedro de Campaña's Descent from the Cross at Seville, and in Spain he painted such characteristic pictures as The Café Concert, Procession on Good Friday, and The Tobacco Factory at Seville (Brussels Gallery). On his return to Belgium he was appointed professor at the Louvain Academy of Fine Arts.

In 1885 he returned to sculpture and produced The Puddler, The Hammerman (1886), Firedamp (1889, Brussels Gallery), Le Débardeur (modeled 1885; many castings made 1889–1905), Ecce Homo (1891), The Old Mine-Horse (1891), The Mower (1892), The Glebe (1892), the monument to Father Damien at Louvain (1893), Puddler at the Furnace (1893), the scheme of decoration for the Botanical Garden of Brussels in collaboration with the sculptor Charles van der Stappen (1893), The Horse at the Pond, in the square in the north-east quarter of Brussels, and two unfinished works, the Monument to Labour and the Émile Zola monument, in collaboration with the French sculptor Alexandre Charpentier.

The Monument to Labour, which was acquired by the State for the Brussels Gallery, comprises four stone bas-reliefs: Industry, The Mine, Harvest, and the Harbour; four bronze statues: The Sower, The Smith, The Miner, and the Ancestor; and a bronze group, Maternity.

He was one of the co-founders of the Société Libre des Beaux-Arts of Brussels and was a member of the International Society of Sculptors, Painters and Gravers.

Meunier was a freemason and a member of the lodge Les Amis Philanthropes of the Grand Orient of Belgium in Brussels.

Meunier died in Ixelles on 4 April 1905.

== Works ==
Paintings

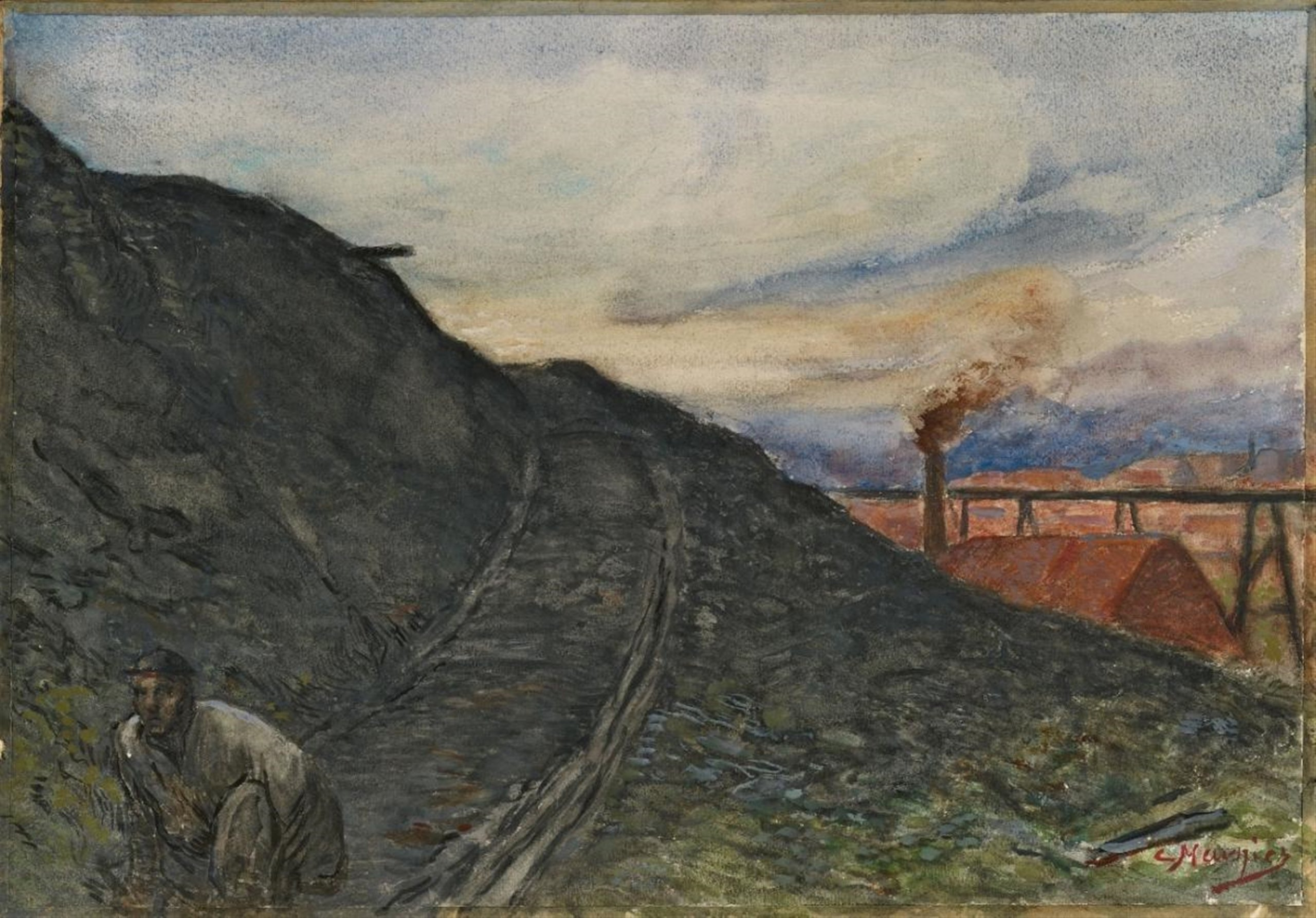
Path descending from the slag heap

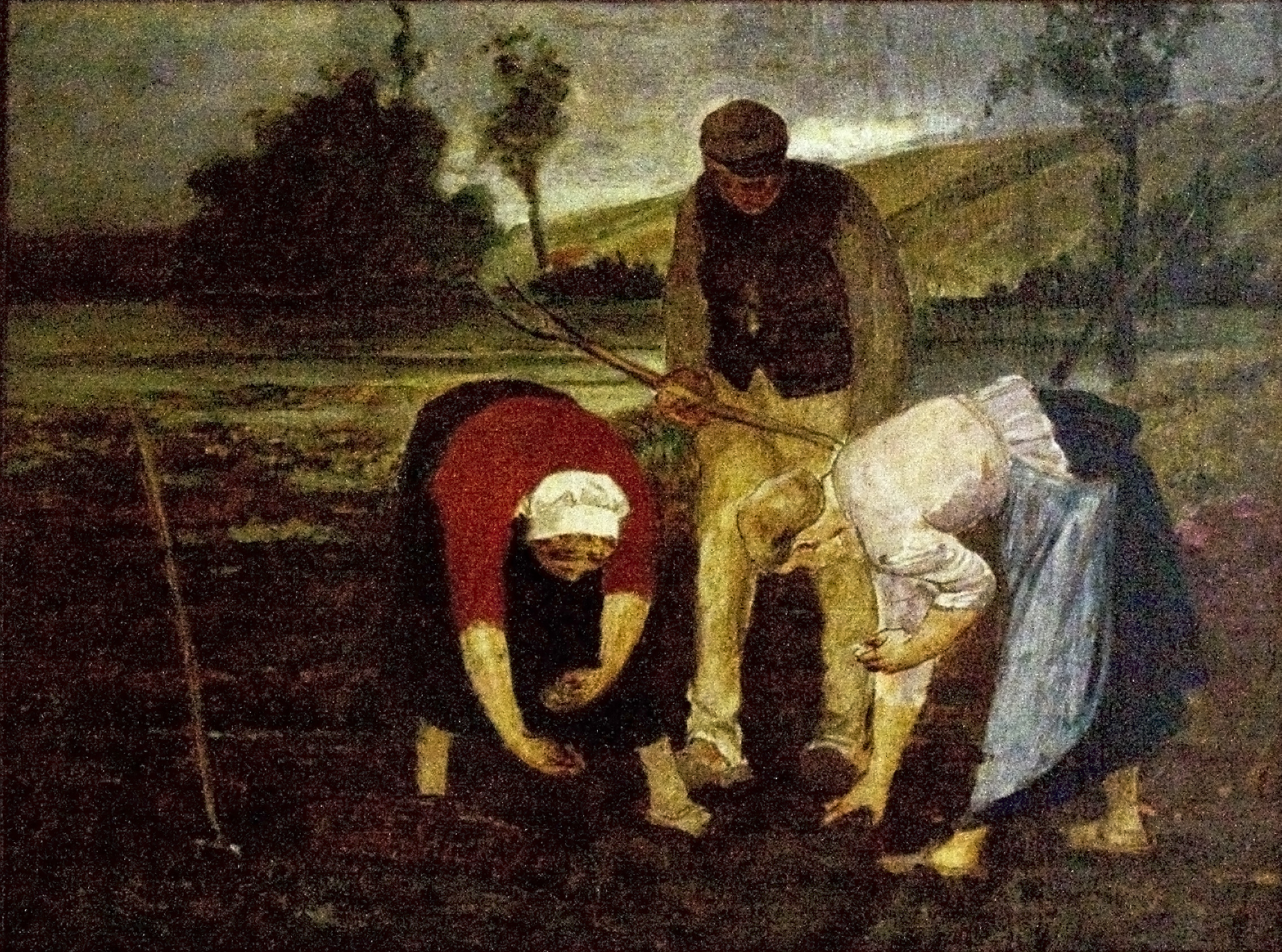
Potato diggers

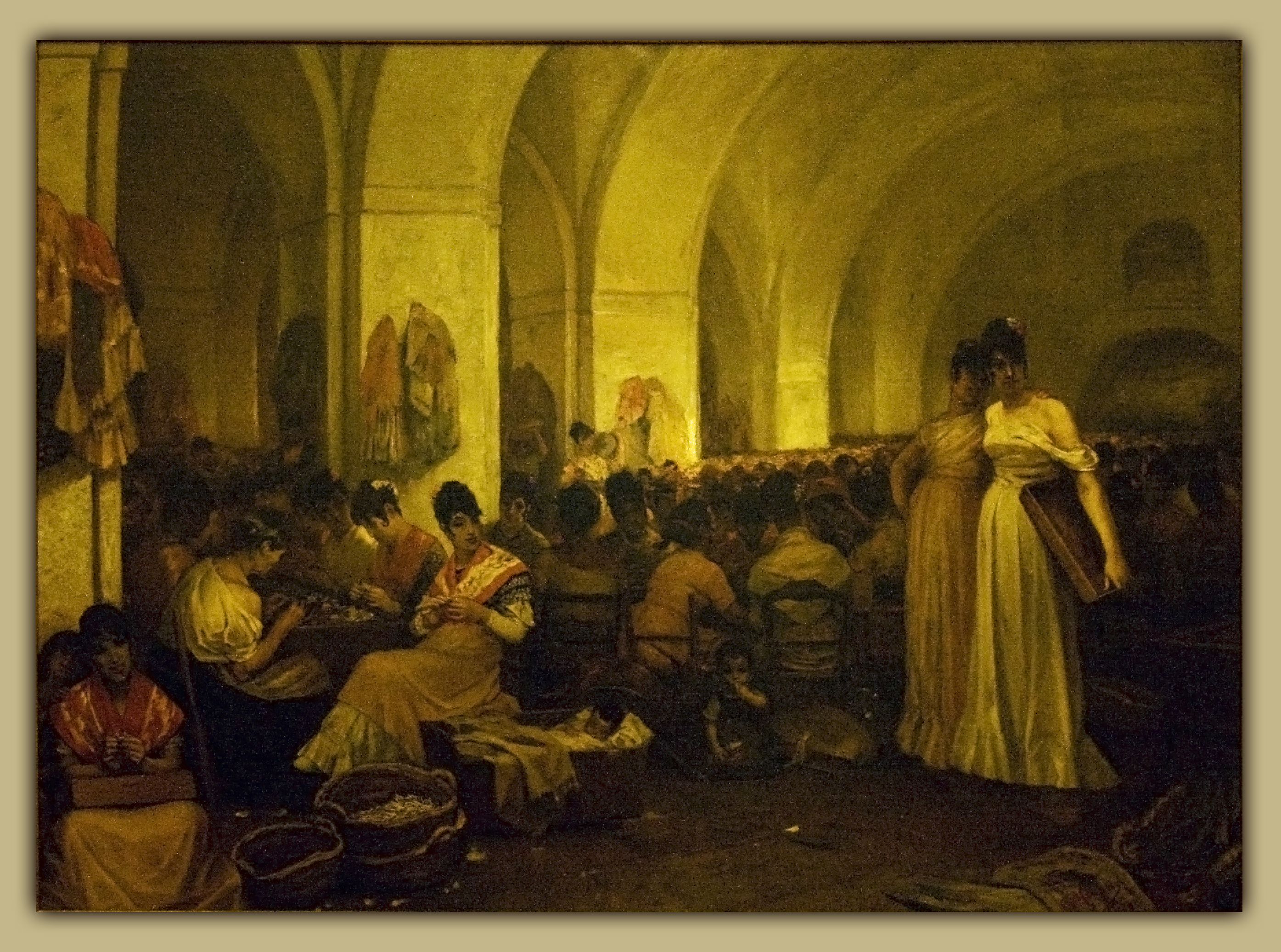
Tobacco Factory, Sevilla

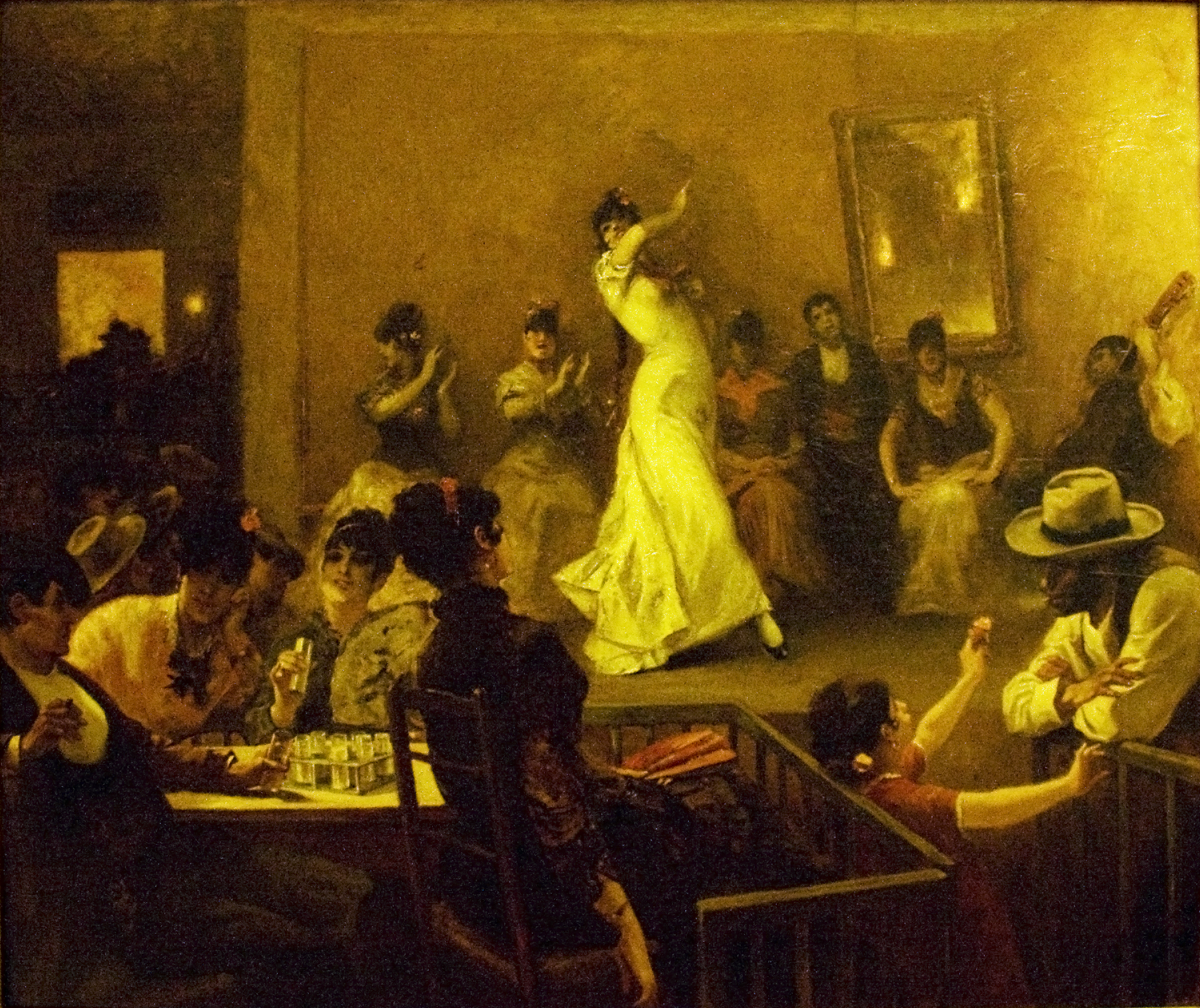
Café del Buzero, Sevilla

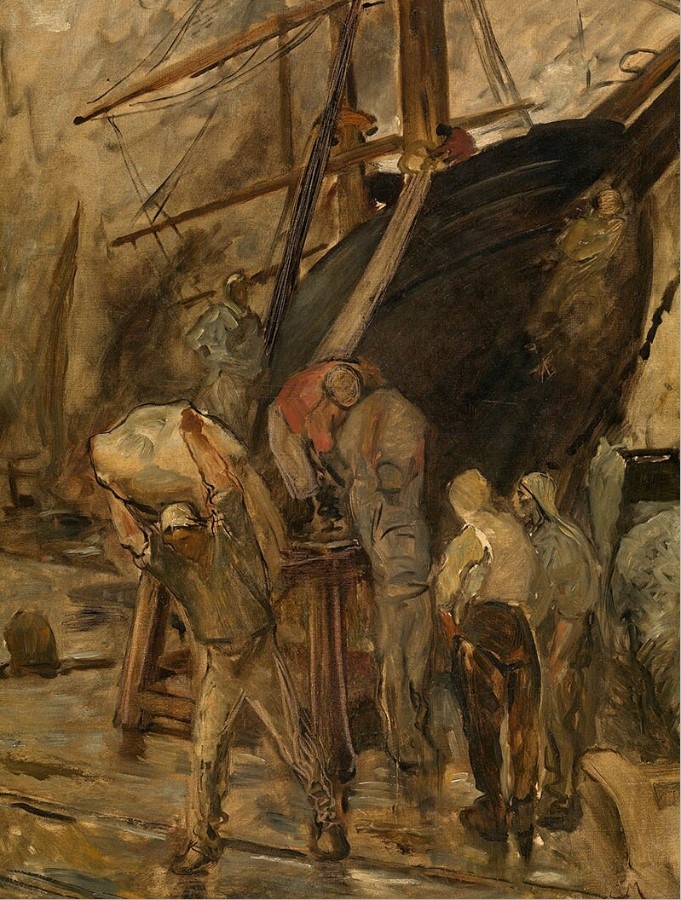
Unloading of a sailboat

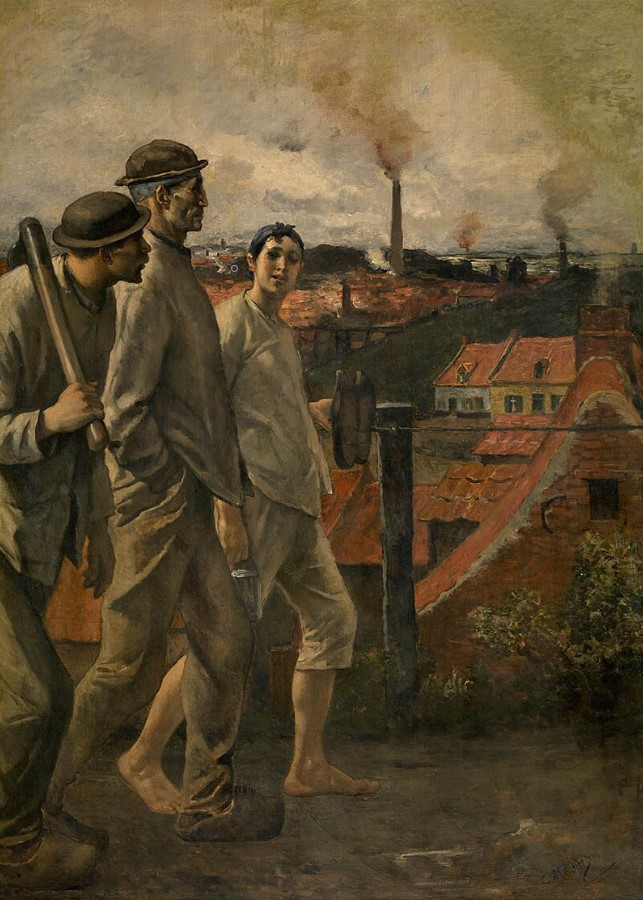
The Return of the Miners

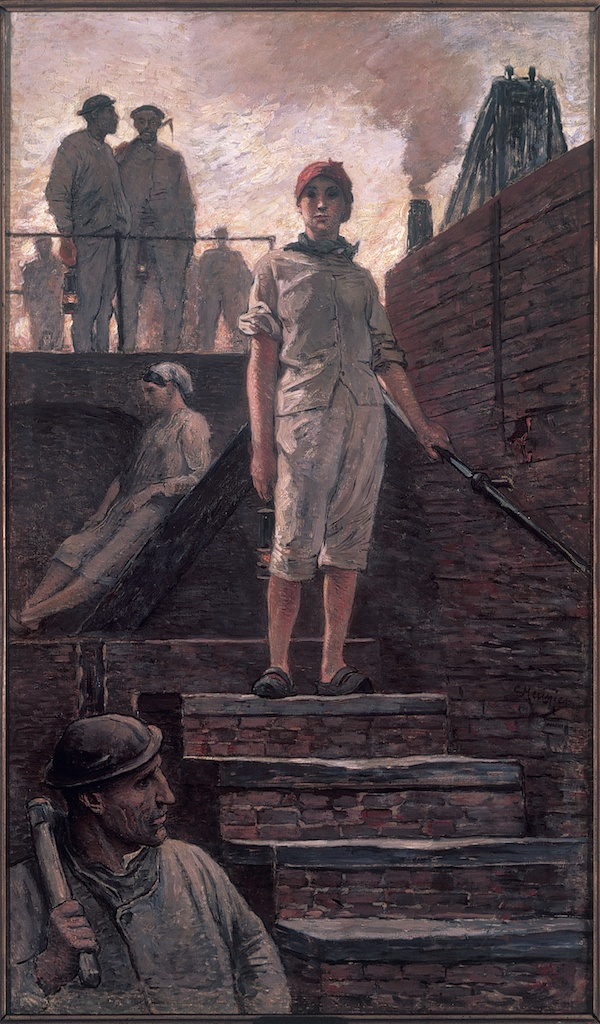
Female miner descending into the pit

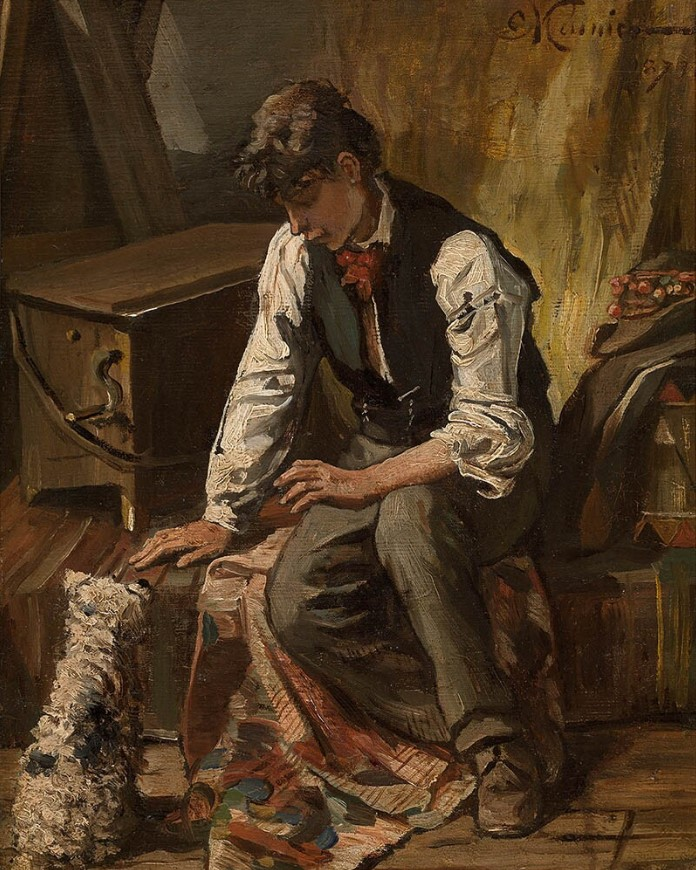
The organ grinder
Sculptures

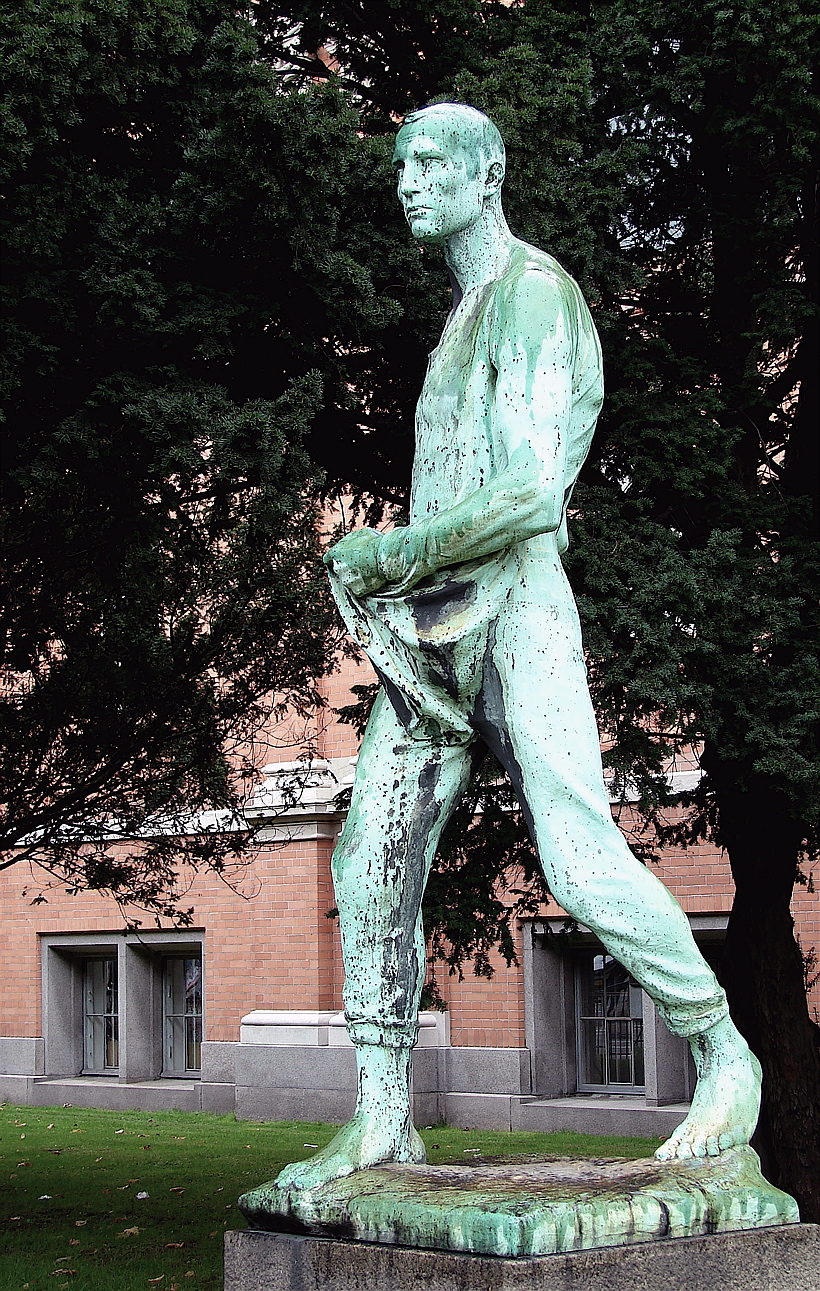
The sower

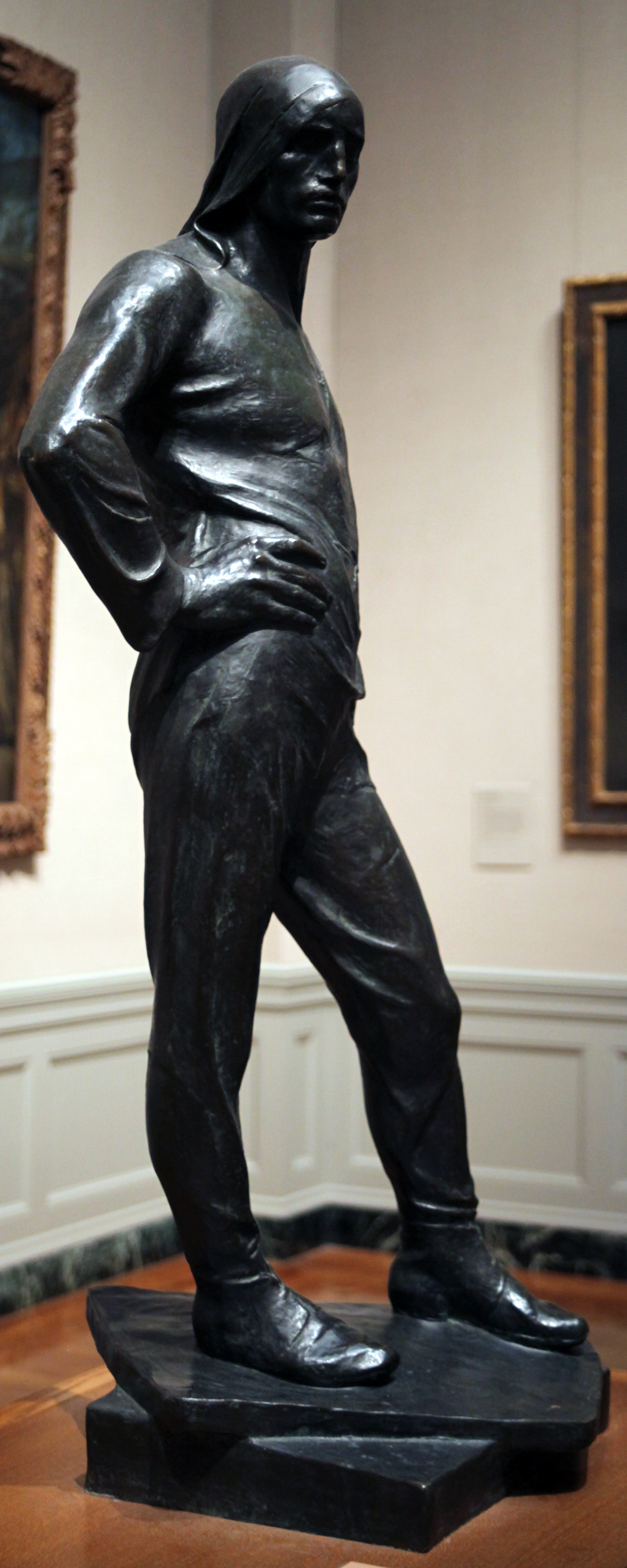
The Dock Worker

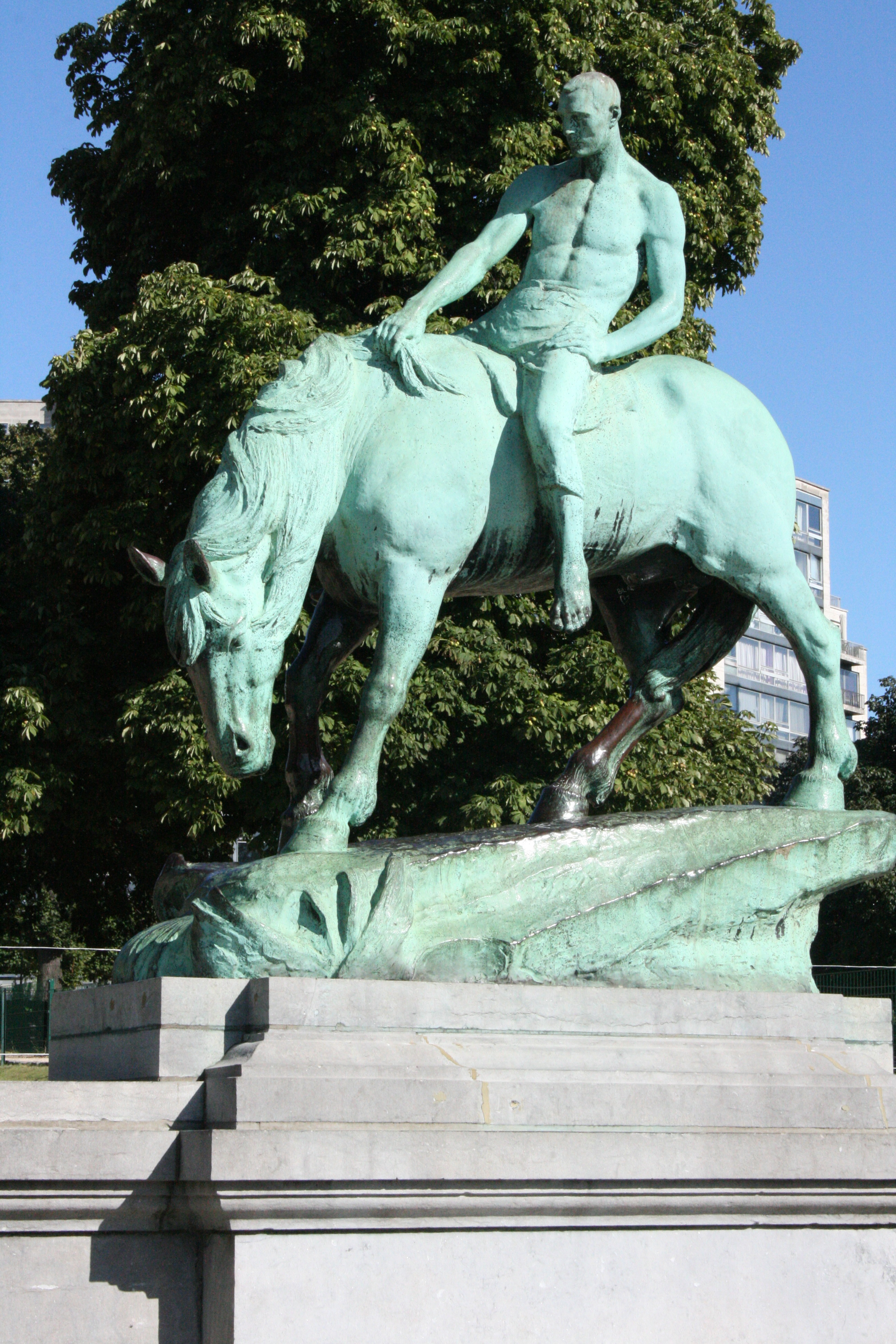
The Horse at the Pond 1899

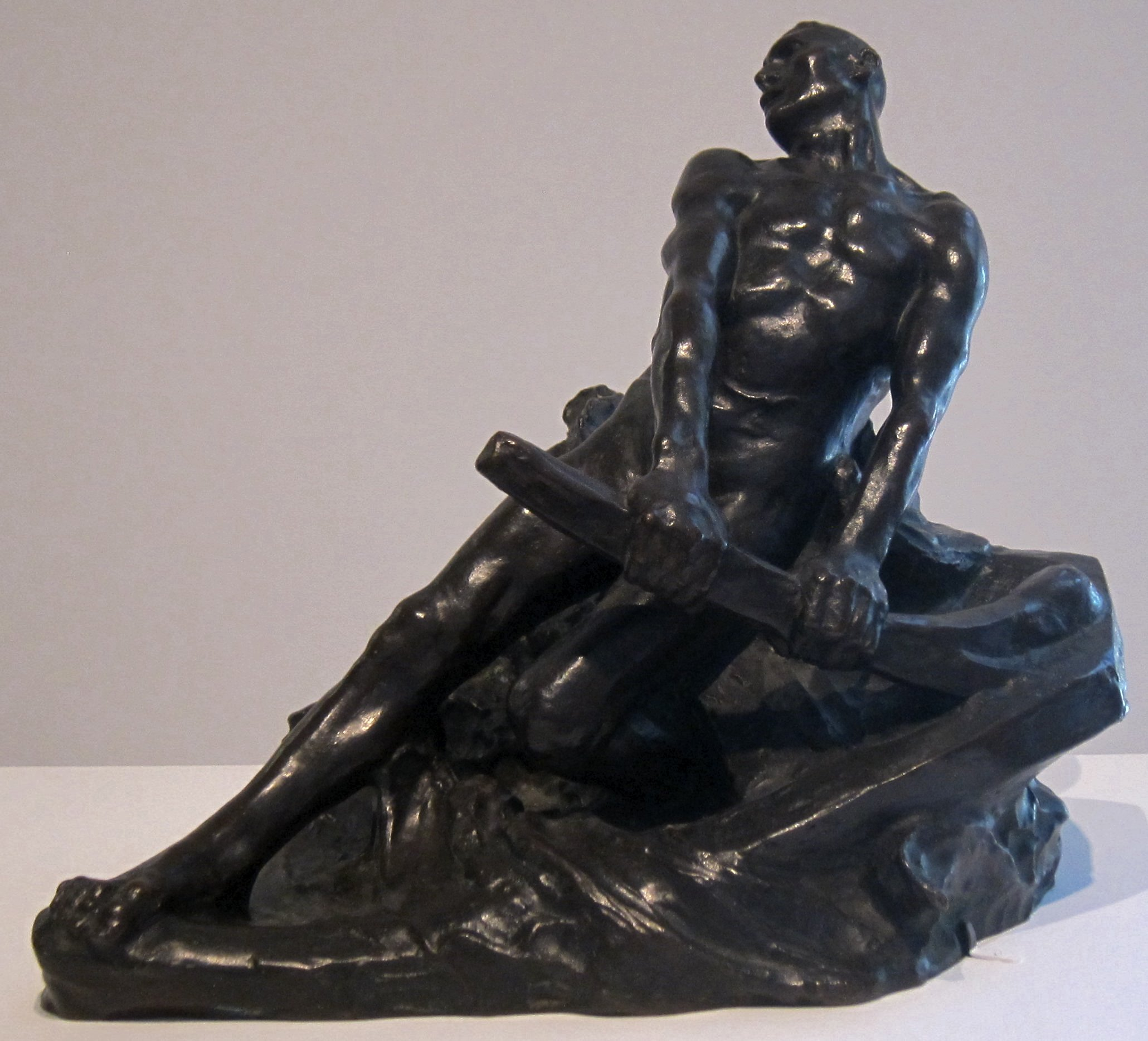
Man Battling with the Elements

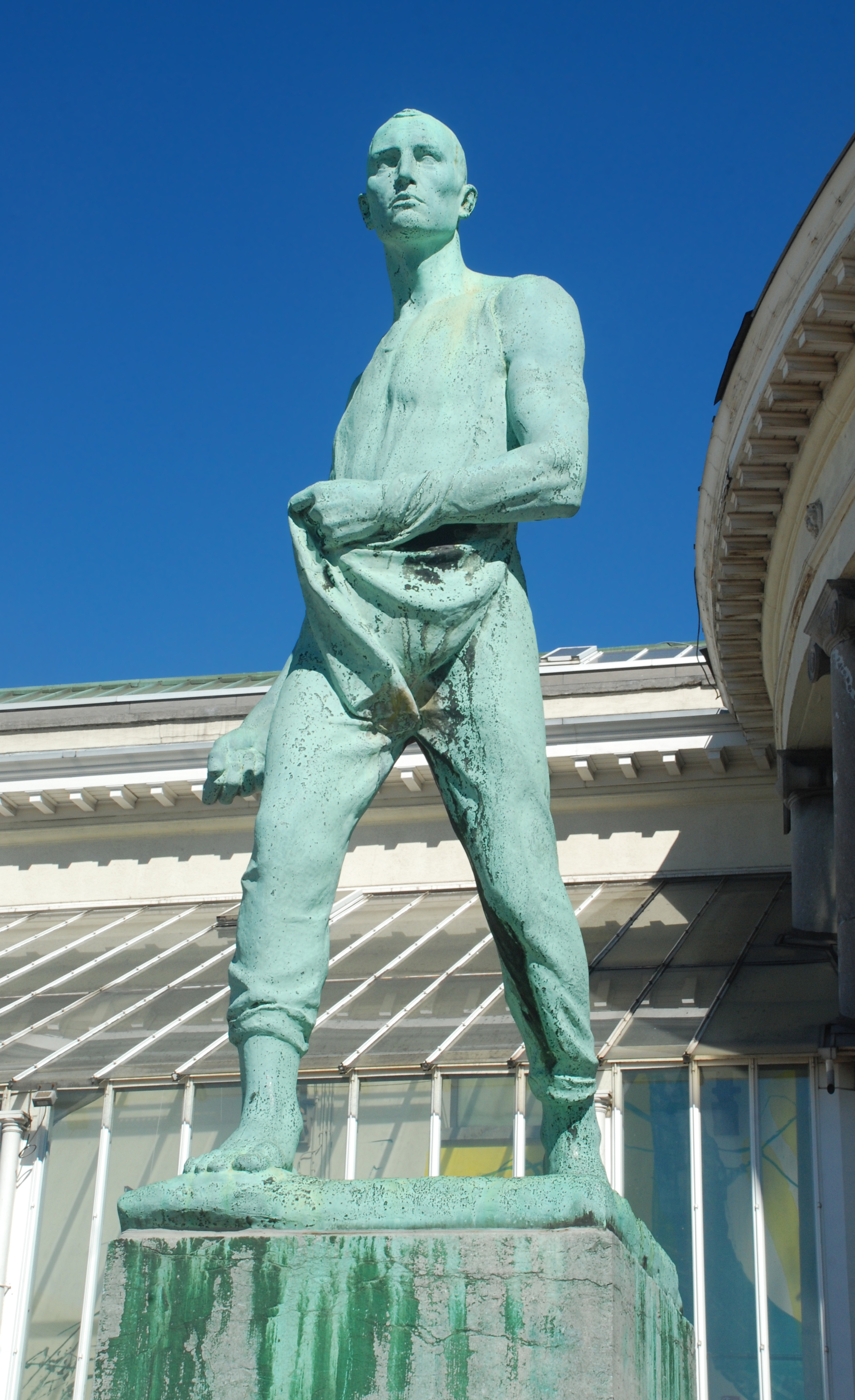
Autumn (Botanical Garden of Brussels)

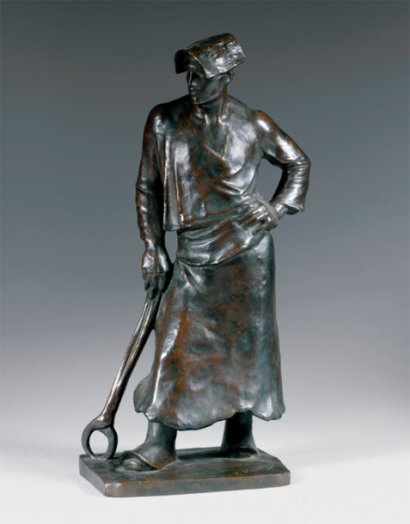
The Hammerman

== Museum collections ==
In 1939, the Constantin Meunier Museum dedicated to his work was opened in the last house in which Meunier lived and worked, in Ixelles, Brussels. Today about 150 of his works are displayed there as one of the constituent museums of the Royal Museums of Fine Arts of Belgium. The Fin-de-Siècle Museum, also part of the same institution, holds a notable collection of Meunier's works. Other museums in Belgium with Meunier's works in their collections include the M - Museum Leuven, La Boverie (Liège), Museum of Fine Arts, Ghent, and the Royal Museum of Fine Arts Antwerp.

Internationally, his work is also held by the Musée d'Orsay (France), Galleria d'Arte Moderna, Milan (Italy), the National Gallery of Art (United States), the National Gallery of Canada, the Staatliche Museen zu Berlin (Germany), and the Hungarian National Gallery amongst others.

== See also ==
- Saemann (Meunier)

== Sources ==
- P. & V. Berko, "Dictionary of Belgian painters born between 1750 & 1875", Knokke 1981, pp. 466–467.
