= The Reaper (Bohland) =

Sculpture by Gustav Bohland

- Artist: Gustav Bohland
- Year: 1952
- Type: Bronze
- Dimensions: 150 cm (60 in)
- Location: Froedtert Malting Company, Milwaukee, Wisconsin; 43°0′18.054″N 87°57′42.926″W

The Reaper is a public art work by artist Gustav Bohland, located on the south side of Milwaukee, Wisconsin.

The bronze sculpture depicts an agricultural worker dressed in overalls and a wide-brimmed hat. One hand rests against his hip, and the other hand grasps the snath of a scythe that rests across his shoulders. The tool's toe and cline hang behind the figure's back. His boots rest on a small round base mounted on a circular flagstone pedestal.

The artwork is located at the former corporate headquarters of Froedtert Malting Company, which is now the US headquarters of MaltEurop.

== See also ==
- Bird and Fish
- The Sower
