= Fin-de-Siècle Museum =

Museum in Brussels, Belgium

- Musée Fin-de-Siècle (French); Fin-de-Siècle Museum (Dutch)
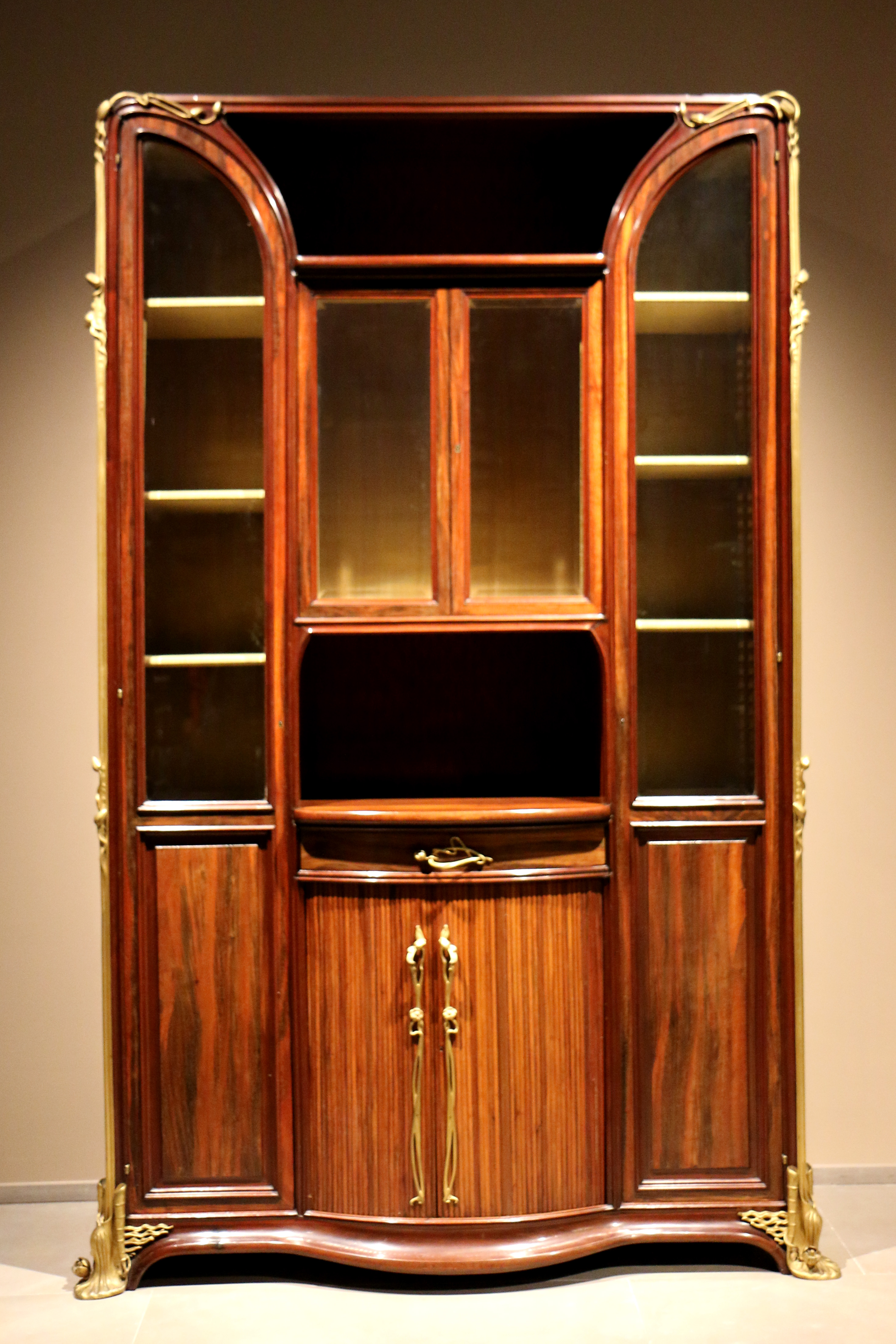
- Waterlily bookcase by Louis Majorelle, in the Gillon-Crowet collection
- Interactive fullscreen map
- Established: 6 December 2013; 12 years ago
- Location: Place Royale / Koningsplein 1, 1000 City of Brussels, Brussels-Capital Region, Belgium
- Coordinates: 50°50′31″N 4°21′30″E
- Collections: Impressionism, Art Nouveau
- Public transit access: Brussels-Central; 1 5 Parc/Park and 2 6 Trône/Troon
- Website: www.fine-arts-museum.be/en/museums/musee-fin-de-siecle-museum

The Fin-de-Siècle Museum (French: Musée Fin-de-Siècle, pronounced [myze fɛ̃ də sjɛkl]; Dutch: Fin-de-Siècle Museum; "Museum of the Turn of the Century") is a museum in the Royal Quarter of Brussels, Belgium. It is dedicated to the full spectrum of the arts of the period between 1884, when the Société Libre des Beaux-Arts ("Free Society of Fine Arts") was founded Brussels, and 1914, the year of the outbreak of World War I. It is one of the constituent museums of the Royal Museums of Fine Arts of Belgium.

The museum, inaugurated on 6 December 2013, partly replaces the Royal Museum of Modern Art (French: Musée royal d'Art moderne; Dutch: Koninklijk Museum voor Moderne Kunst), closed on 1 February 2011, and is partially housed in its former halls. It is located at 1, place Royale/Koningsplein.

== Collection ==
Artists represented in the museum's collection include Emile Claus, Eugène Laermans, Constantin Meunier, James Ensor, Henri Evenepoel, Fernand Khnopff, and Léon Spilliaert. The museum also celebrates the richness of the period in literature, architecture, photography, opera, music, and poetry, featuring works by Maurice Maeterlinck, Emile Verhaeren, Octave Maus, Victor Horta, Henry Van de Velde, Maurice Kufferath, and Guillaume Lekeu.

Important international artists of the period in the collection include Alfred Sisley, Vincent van Gogh, Auguste Rodin, Georges Seurat, Paul Gauguin, and Edward Burne-Jones. The Gillon-Crowet gallery houses a collection of Art Nouveau furniture and decorative arts.

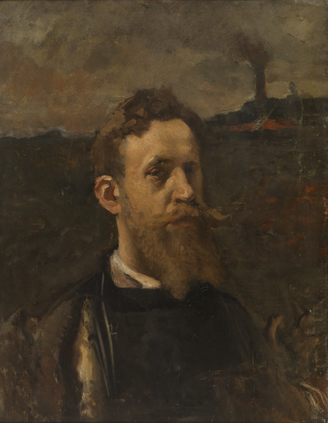
Self-portrait, Constantin Meunier, 1885

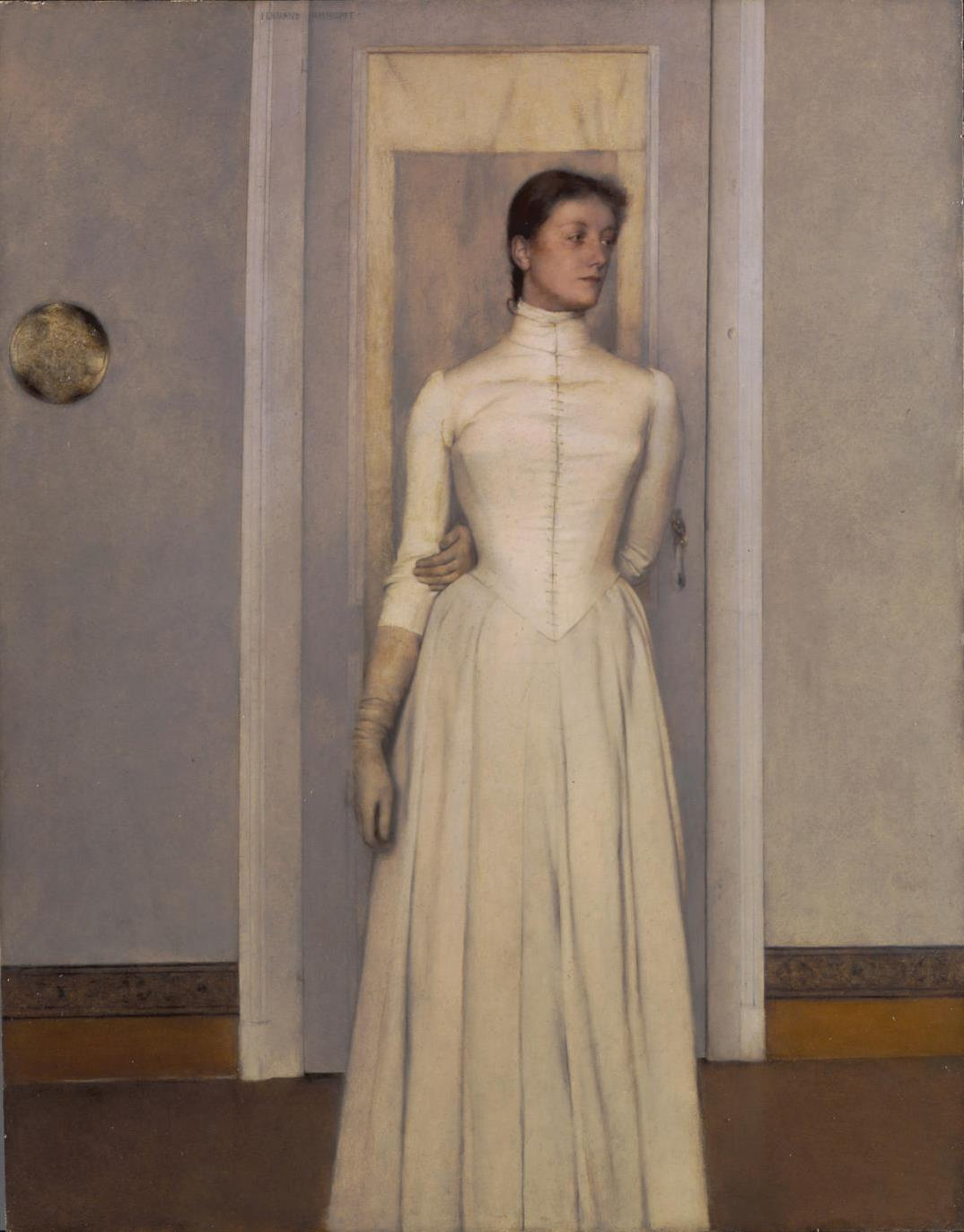
Portrait of Marguerite Khnopff, Fernand Khnopff, 1887

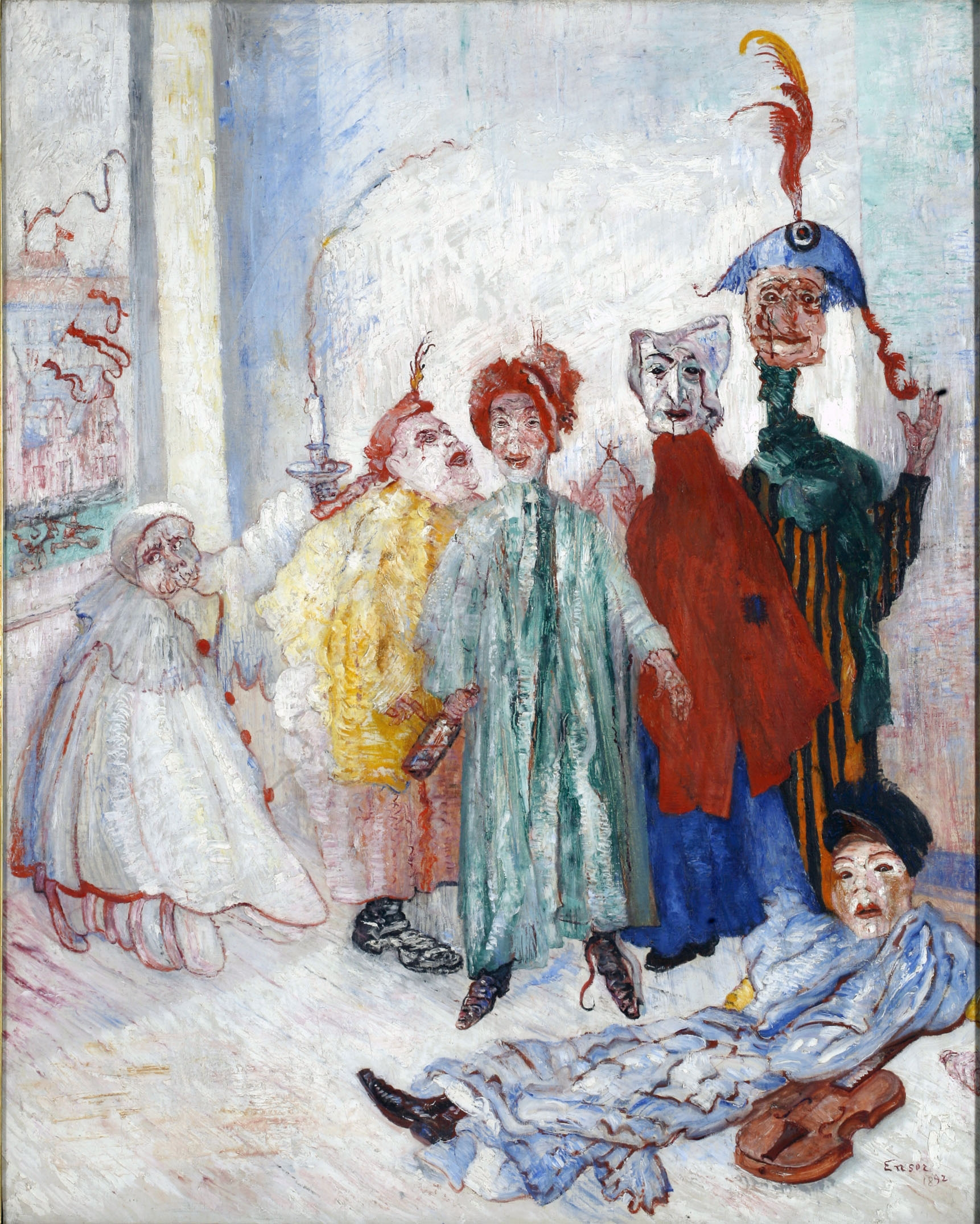
Les masques singuliers, James Ensor, 1892

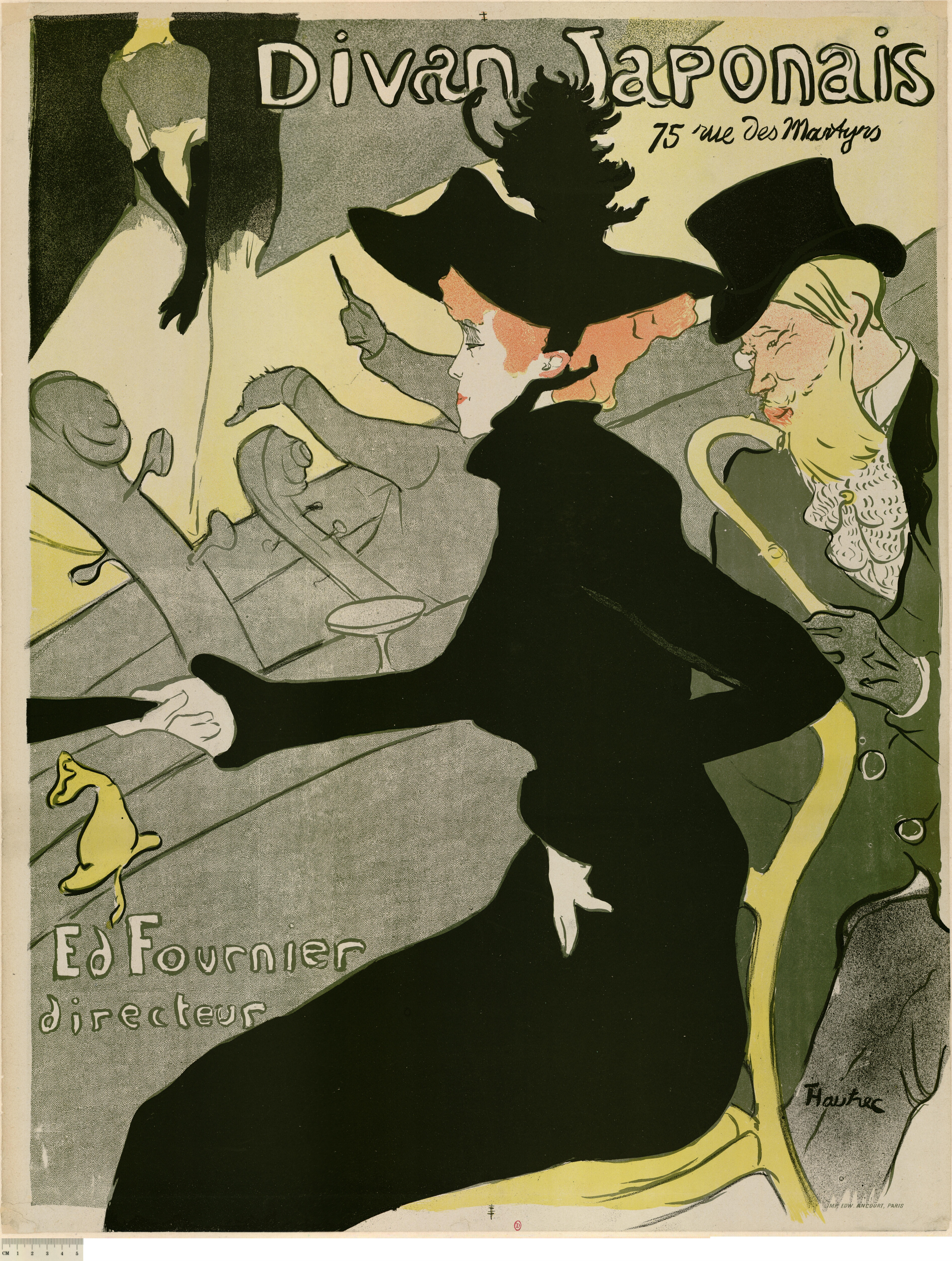
Divan Japonais, Henri de Toulouse-Lautrec, 1893

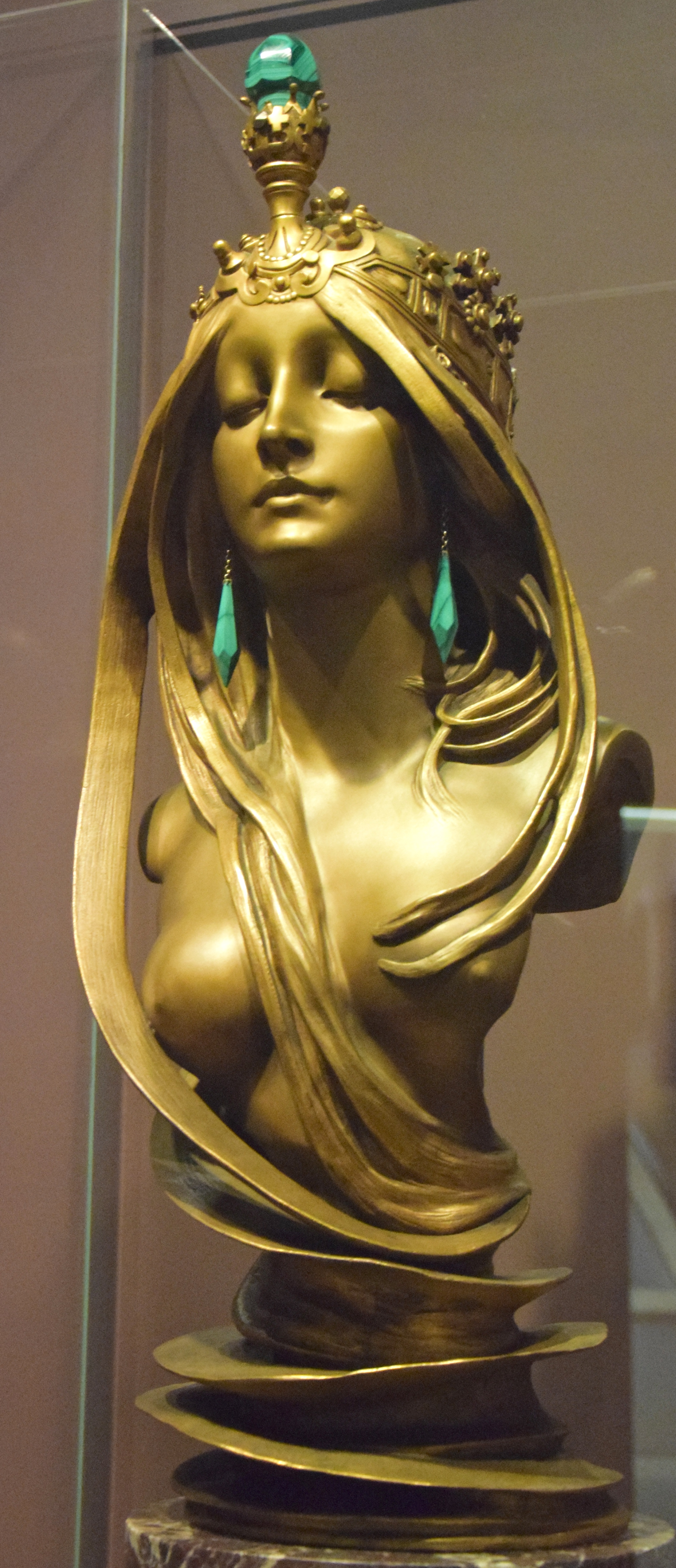
Nature, Alphonse Mucha, 1899–1900

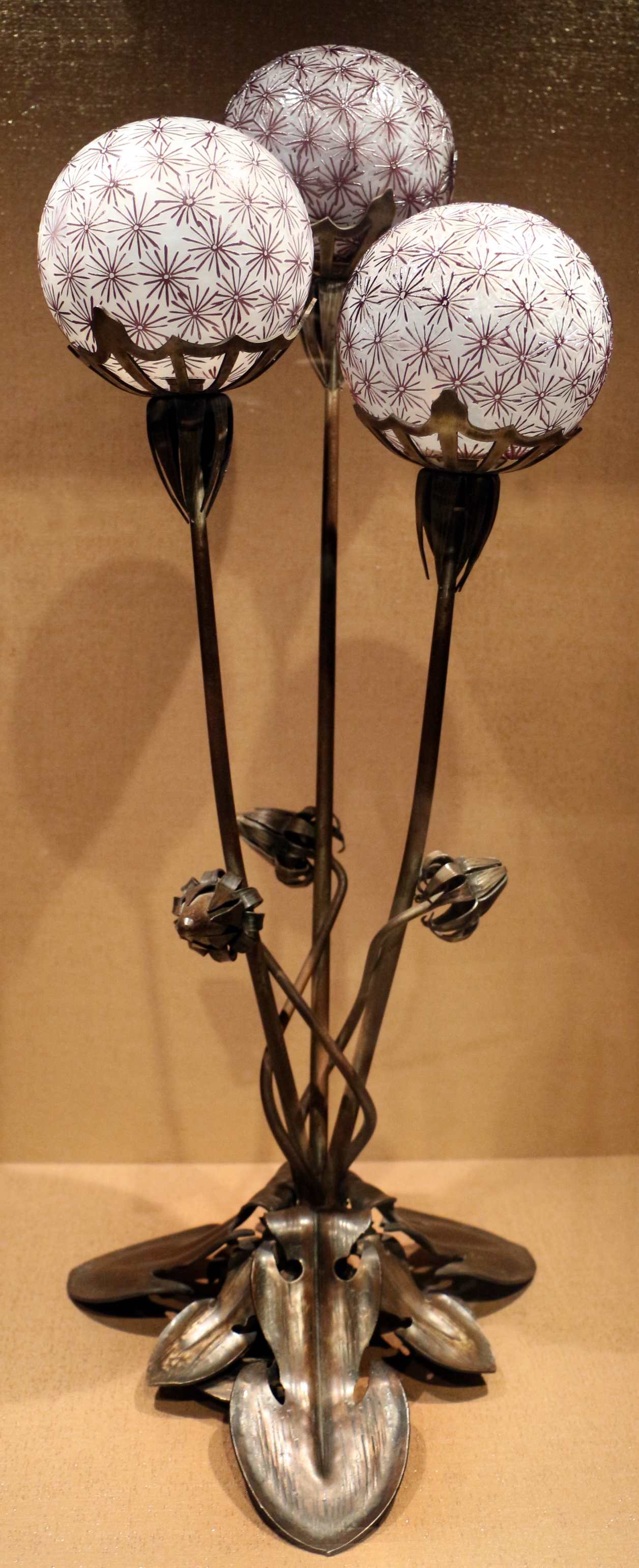
Three-armed dandelion lamp, Antonin Daum and Louis Majorelle, 1902

== See also ==
- List of museums in Brussels
- Art Nouveau in Brussels
- History of Brussels
- Culture of Belgium
- Belgium in the long nineteenth century
