= Bird and Fish =

Artwork by Gustav Bohland

- Artist: Gustav Bohland
- Year: 1948
- Type: Bronze
- Dimensions: 94 cm × 51 cm × 33 cm (37 in × 20 in × 13 in)
- Location: Froedtert Malting Company, Milwaukee, Wisconsin; 43°0′17.854″N 87°57′43.11″W

Bird and Fish is a public art work by artist Gustav Bohland, located on the south side of Milwaukee, Wisconsin, United States.

The bronze sculpture depicts a seagull and large fish in a struggle over a smaller fish.

The sculpture is located at the former corporate headquarters of Froedtert Malting Company, which is now the US headquarters of MaltEurop.

== See also ==
- The Sower
- The Reaper
