= Le Marteleur =

Bronze statue in New York City

Coordinates: 40.8092°N 73.9604°W

- The Hammerman
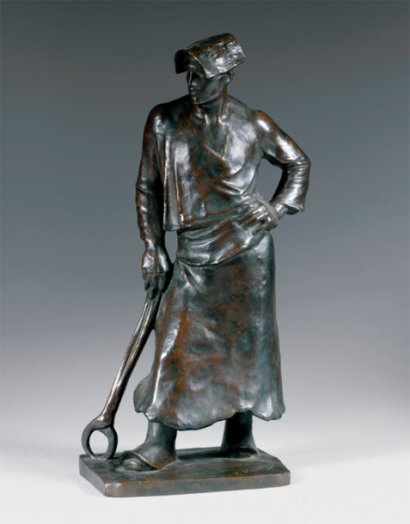
- Artist: Constantin Meunier
- Year: 1886
- Dimensions: 118 cm × 55 cm × 33 cm (46 in × 22 in × 13 in)
- Location: Columbia University, New York City

Le Marteleur (French: [lə maʁt.lœʁ]; variously translated as The Hammerman or The Drop Forger) is a bronze sculpture by Belgian sculptor Constantin Meunier. It depicts a hammerman holding a pair of pincers and wearing an apron, cap, and spats. Created in 1886, several casts of the statue exist, including one on the campus of Columbia University.

== History ==
Le Marteleur was contemporaneous with the Belgian strike of 1886, considered by historians to be the first time the Belgian working class achieved significant concessions from the national government. Inspired by the "plastic grandeur of the industrial worker," Meunier's work reflected the political and economic developments of his day in his depiction of the hammerer: while the realism of the statue indicated the difficulty of the worker's labor, the contrapposto posture of its subject, borrowed from Classical and Renaissance sculpture, idealized and elevated him. The plaster cast of the statue was exhibited at the Parisian Salon 1886, where it earned an honorable mention. The Columbia cast of Le Marteleur was gifted to the university in 1914 by the Columbia University School of Mines Class of 1889. It was originally located in front of Lewisohn Hall, but now stands in front of the Mudd Building, where the Fu Foundation School of Engineering and Applied Sciences is located.
