= Lewisohn Hall =

Building on the Columbia University campus in Manhattan, New York, U.S.

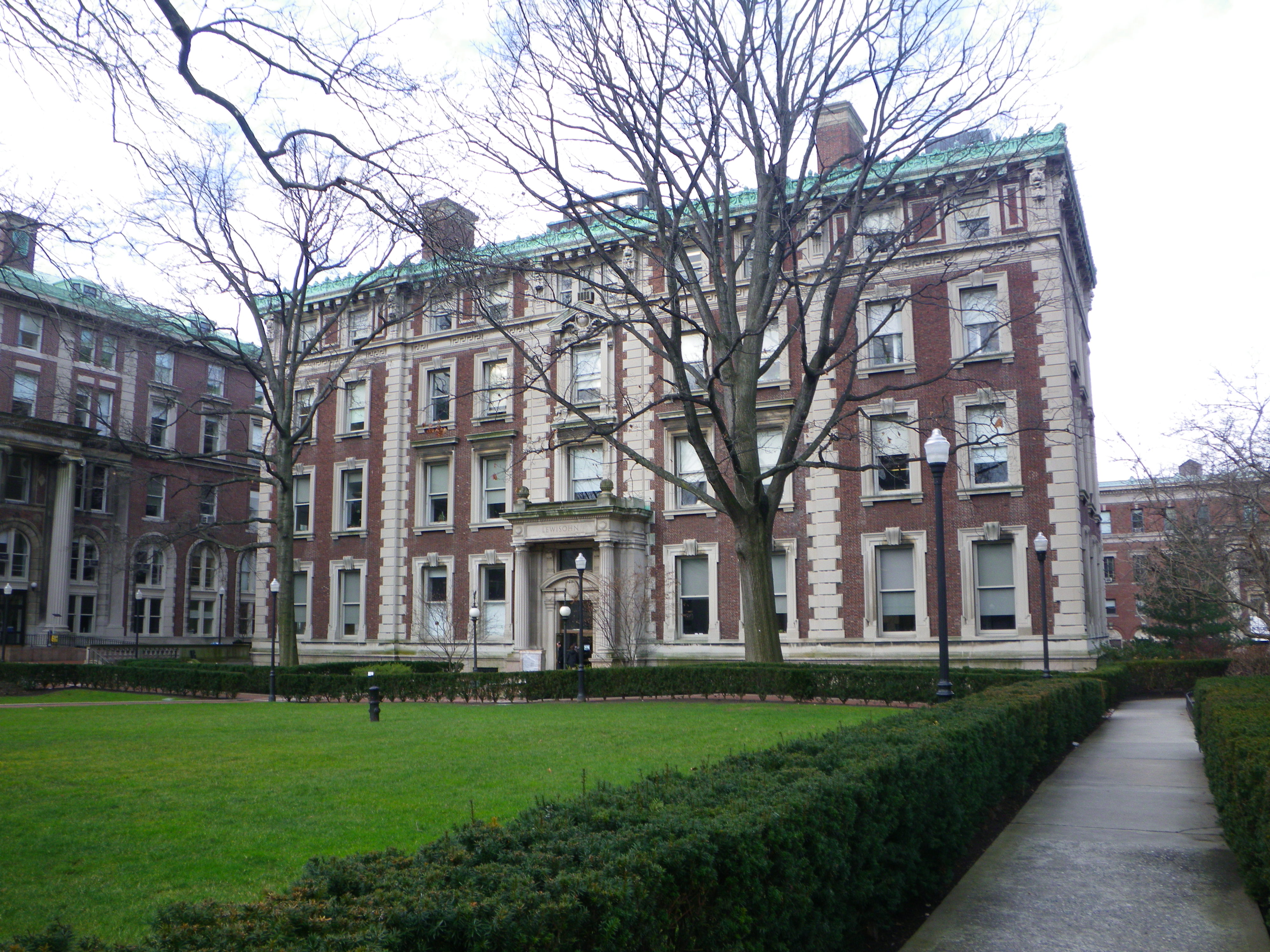
- The building in 2013
- Interactive map of the Lewisohn Hall area

General information
- Location: 2970 Broadway, New York, NY 10027
- Coordinates: 40.8084°N 73.9632°W
- Year built: 1905

Design and construction
- Architect: Arnold W. Brunner

Lewisohn Hall is a building on the Columbia University campus in Manhattan, New York. Completed in 1905, it was designed by Arnold W. Brunner in imitation of the other McKim, Mead & White buildings on campus, and named after banker and mining magnate Adolph Lewisohn. The building currently houses the School of General Studies and School of Professional Studies.

The Le Marteleur was formerly located in front of Lewisohn, when the building housed the School of Mines; it was relocated to the Mudd Building when the later moved there in the 1960s.
