= The Sower (Millet) =

1850 painting by Jean-François Millet

- Le Semeur (French)
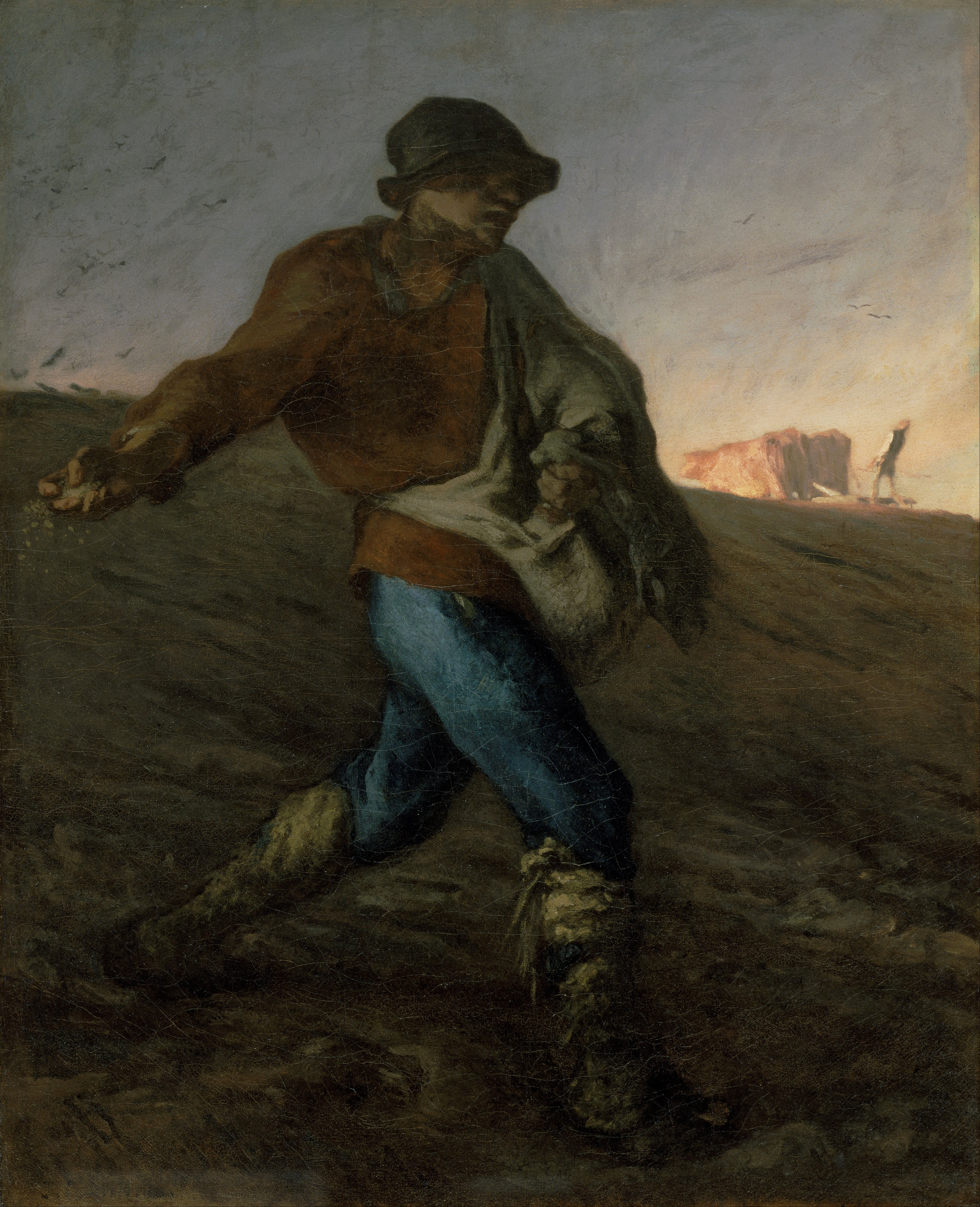
- Artist: Jean-François Millet
- Year: 1850
- Type: Oil painting on canvas
- Dimensions: 101.6 cm × 82.6 cm (40.0 in × 32.5 in)
- Location: Museum of Fine Arts, Boston

The Sower is an oil painting by the French artist Jean-François Millet from 1850. It is one of several versions of the theme that he painted. The work has been in the collection of the Museum of Fine Arts in Boston since 1917.

== History ==
Millet moved to Barbizon in 1849, a village in the Fontainebleau forest, outside Paris. There he was part of the artist group of the School of Barbizon, which painted subdued realistic landscapes and motifs in contrast to the traditional romantic dramatic landscape and painting. Millet was himself a farmer's son and described with dignity and seriousness the hard-working life of the rural population. His paintings have sometimes been perceived as sentimental. At the time, however, they were considered radical because of their social realism. Large-scale depiction of simple agricultural workers was new and controversial in the Paris' art establishment. Millet was often questioned for his "ugly" motifs.

== Description ==
The painting depicts a peasant in the act of sowing land, apparently in winter. The Sun shines at the top of the painting, which indicates that it is dawn. The sower is dressed in a typical peasant's attire, with his legs draped in straw to provide more warmth, walking in long strides, and carrying a bag of seeds over his shoulder, while he is in the act of sowing his crops with the right hand. At the left of the painting several crows appear scavenging the crops. At the right side, in the distance a man is seen harrowing the ground with his oxen for the sowers work. The painting is an unidealized depiction of the peasant's strength and hardworking lifestyle.

The Sower was the first major painting that Millet made in Barbizon. In the same year he painted a nearly identical second version (Yamanashi Prefectural Art Museum, Kofu), which he exhibited at the Paris Salon of 1850 where it received much attention and criticism. Critic Clément de Ris praised it as "an energetic study full of movement", while Théophile Gautier derided it as "trowel scrapings."

Art historian Anthea Callen stated that "Millet intentionally transformed his human laborer into a sinewy giant of a man by elongating his proportions ... Reinforced by the sower's dominance of the pictorial space and our low viewpoint, his menacing appearance to the Parisian bourgeoisie in 1850 is thus readily explicable."

Millet first painted the motif of the sower in 1847–48, in a version now in the National Museum of Wales. In the Wales version the horizon is higher, the sower is less monumental, and more space is given to the landscape than in later versions. After painting the Boston and Kofu versions, he returned to the same motif at least three times. An oil version painted after 1850 is held of the Carnegie Museum of Art in Pittsburgh. Two pastel versions are held at the Clark Art Institute in Williamstown, from around 1850, and at the Walters Art Museum in Baltimore, from around 1865.

Dutch painter Vincent van Gogh found inspiration in Millet's paintings of agricultural landscapes and farm workers. He copied The Sower in several of his own paintings, but transformed the image by using brighter colors.
