= The Sower (Bohland) =

Public artwork in Wisconsin, United States

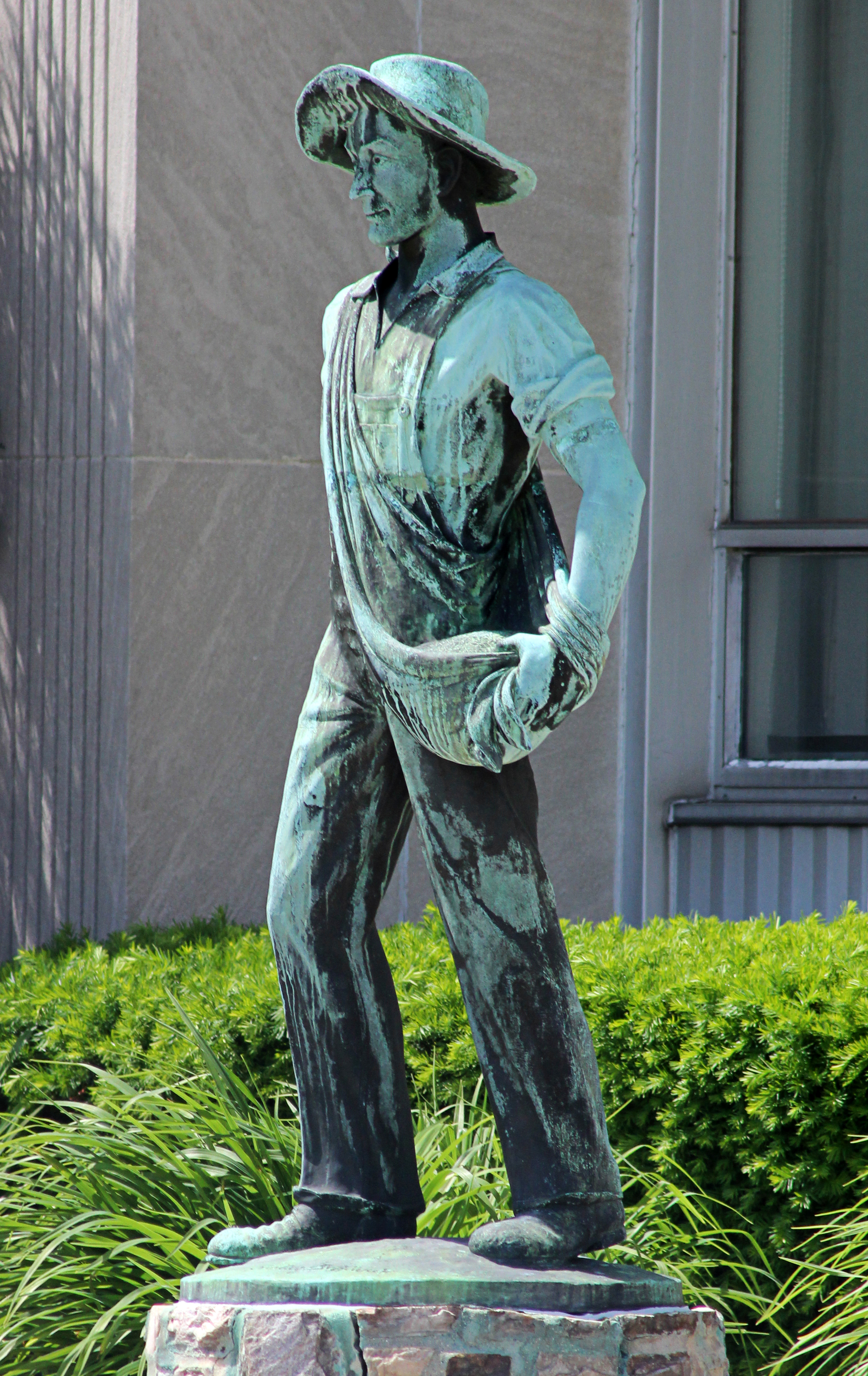
- Artist: Gustav Bohland
- Year: 1952
- Type: Bronze
- Dimensions: 150 cm (60 in)
- Location: Froedtert Malting Company, Milwaukee, Wisconsin; 43°0′18.059″N 87°57′43.274″W

The Sower is a public art work by artist Gustav Bohland, located on the south side of Milwaukee, Wisconsin.

The bronze sculpture depicts an agricultural worker dressed in overalls and carrying a seed bag. The figure's shirt sleeves are rolled up past his elbows, and the wide brim of a hat shades his face. His shirt collar is open. One hand holds the seed bag against his hip, and the other hand is cupped and extended in a gesture of scattering seeds. His boots rest on a small round base mounted on a circular flagstone pedestal.

The sculpture is located at the former corporate headquarters of Froedtert Malting Company, which is now the US headquarters for MaltEurop.

== See also ==
- Bird and Fish
- The Reaper
