= The Sower (Meunier) =

Sculpture by Constantin Meunier

- Year: 1890
- Medium: Sculpture
- Location: Germany

The Sower is a sculpture by the Belgian artist Constantin Meunier of which multiple copies were made.

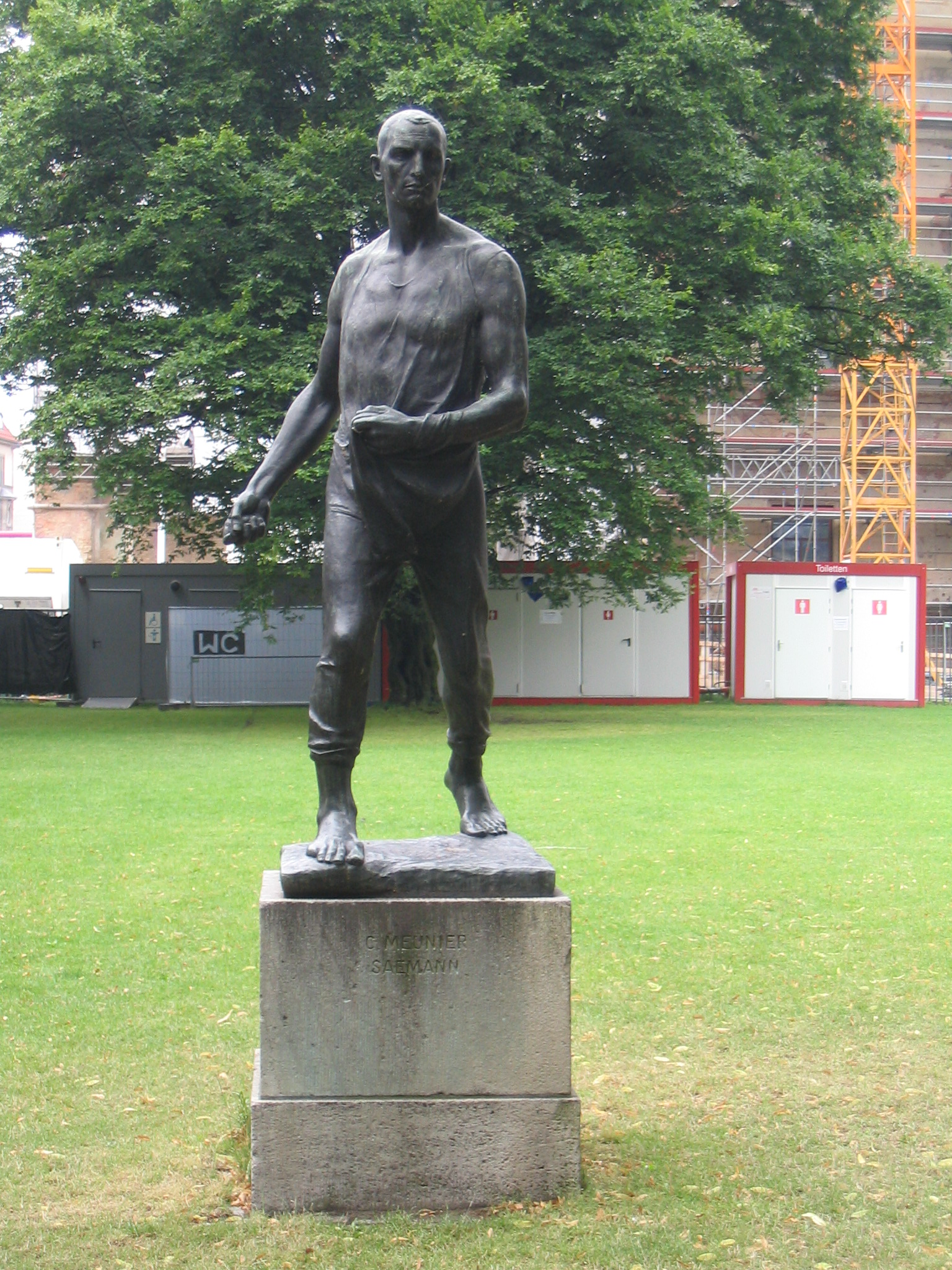
Inscription reads: "C. Meunier – Saemann" (1896), Berlin-Mitte/Berlin/Germany

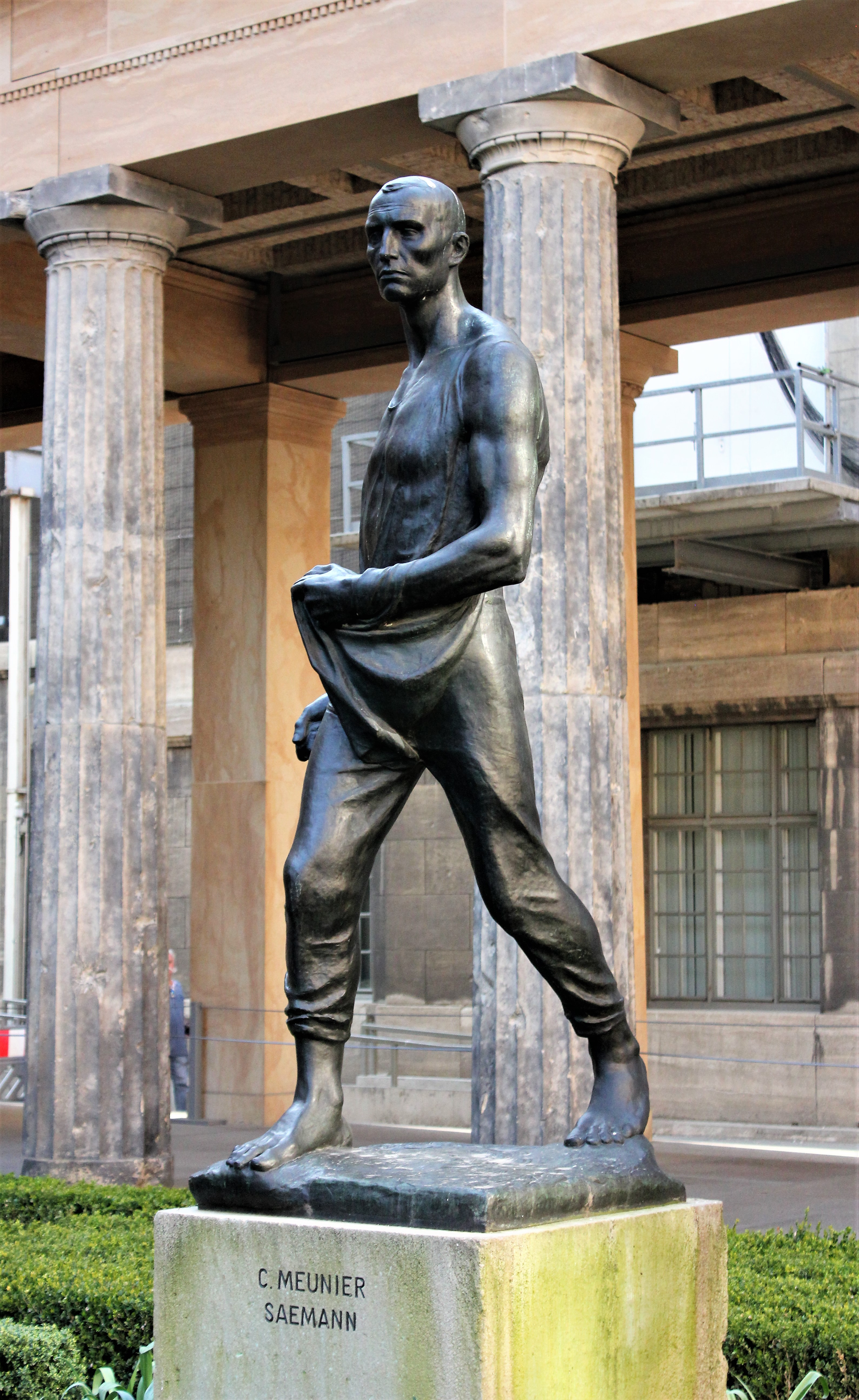
The sculpture outside the Alte Nationalgalerie in Berlin, Germany, 2016

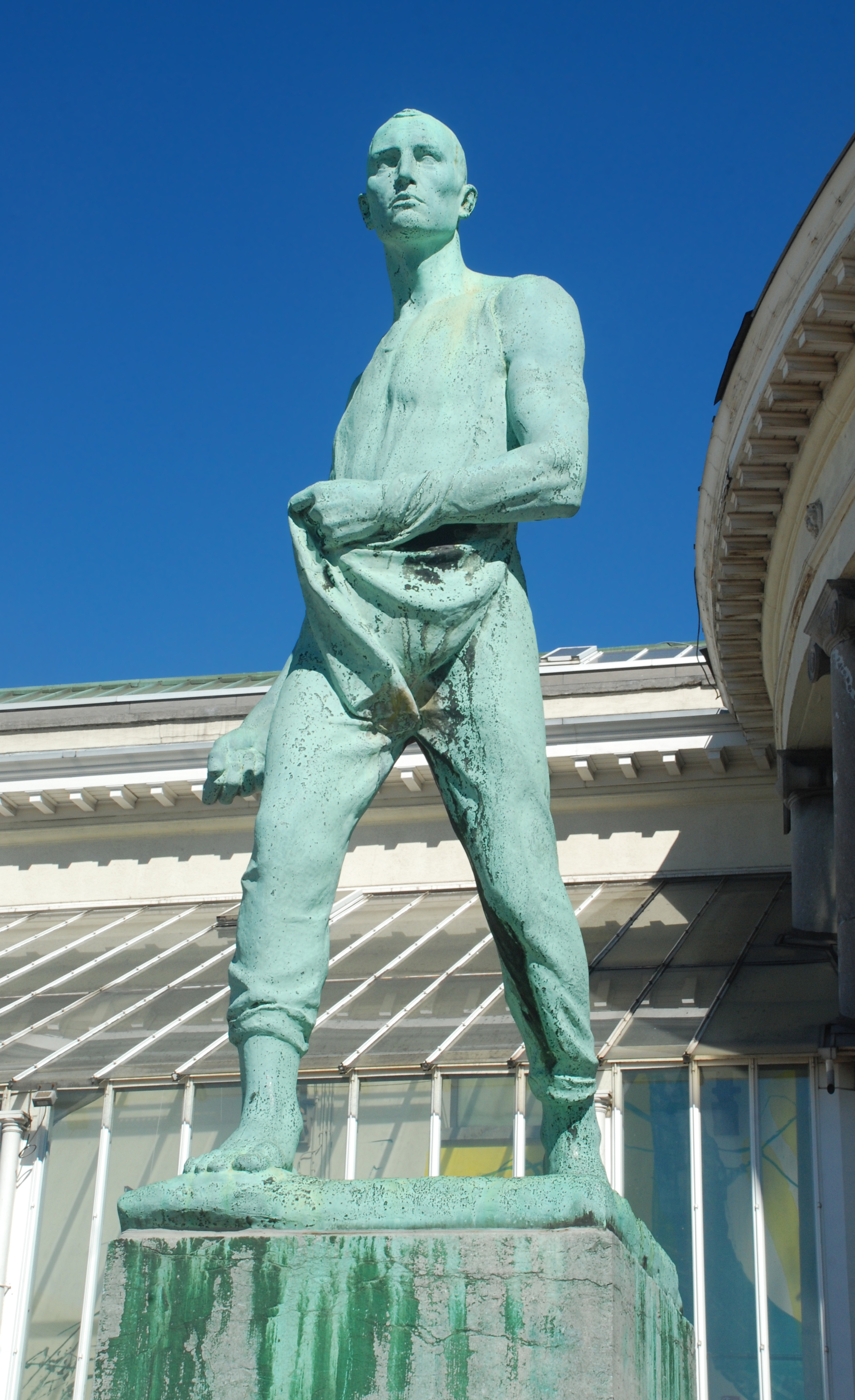
Autumn or The Sower in the Botanical Garden of Brussels

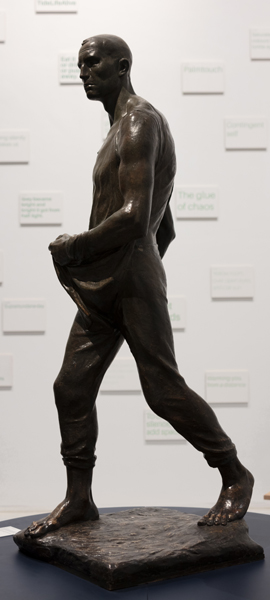
M – Museum Leuven
