= Yamanashi Prefectural Art Museum =

Museum in Kōfu, Yamanashi, Japan

Coordinates: 35.6604°N 138.5373°E

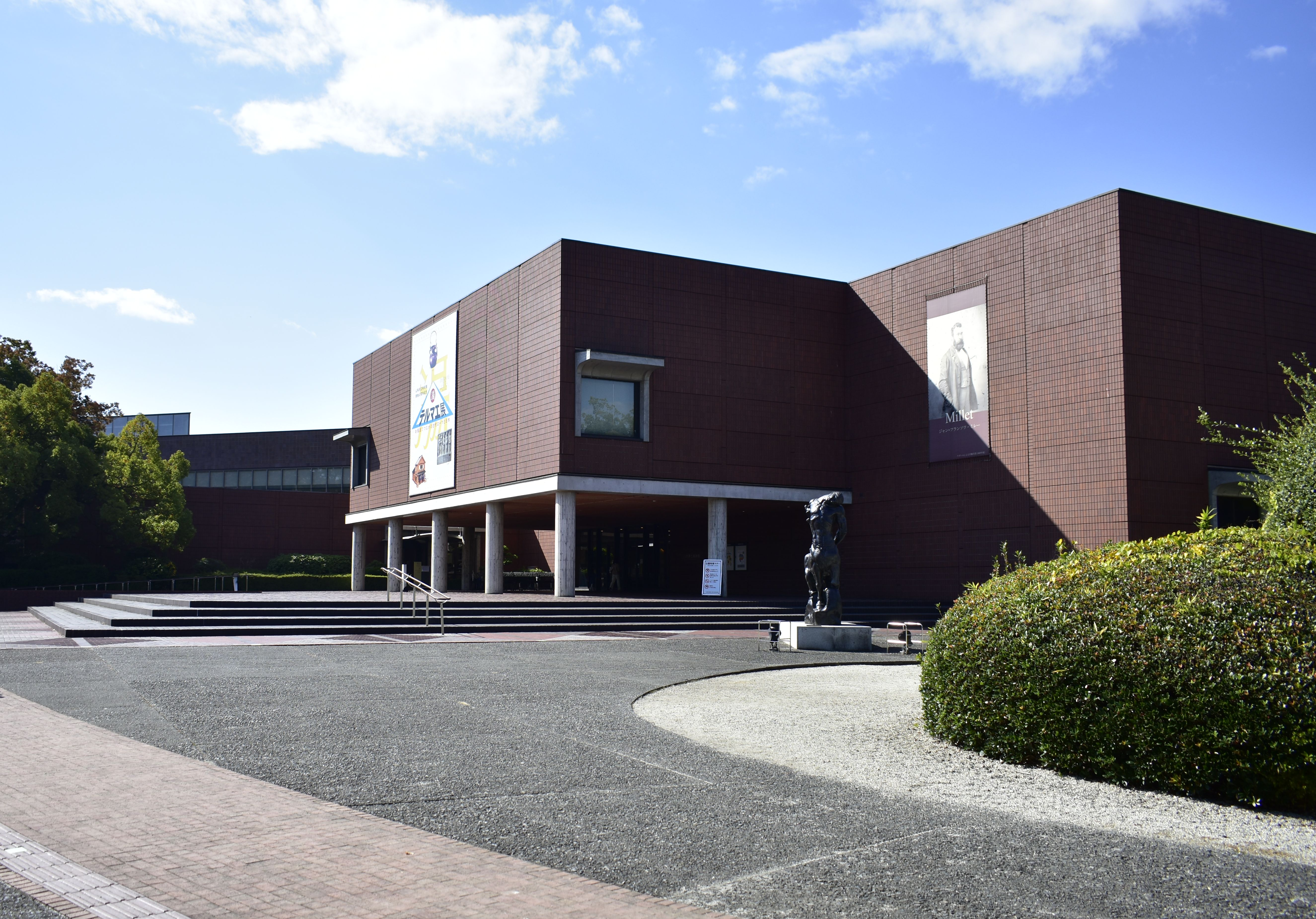
Yamanashi Prefectural Art Museum

Yamanashi Prefectural Art Museum (山梨県立美術館, Yamanashi Kenritsu Bijutsukan) is a museum in Kōfu, Yamanashi Prefecture, Japan. It is one of Japan's many museums which are supported by a prefecture.
