= Lucas Gassel =

16th-century Flemish Renaissance painter

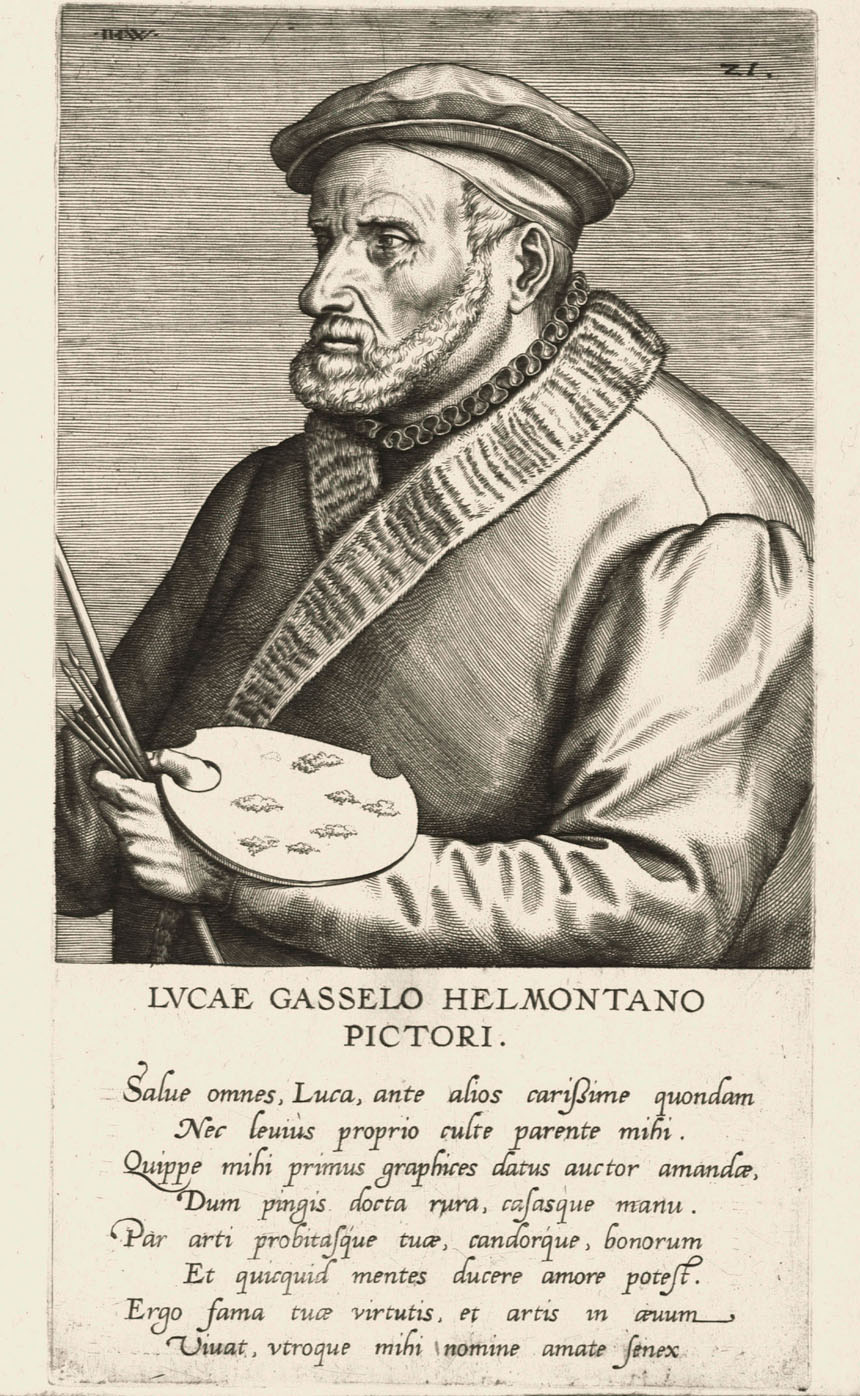
Lucas Gassel in the Pictorum aliquot celebrium by Dominicus Lampsonius, contemporary engraving

Lucas Gassel or Lucas van Gassel (Deurne, c. 1485 – Brussels, 1568 or 1569) was a Flemish Renaissance painter and draughtsman known for his landscapes. He helped further develop and modernize the landscape tradition in Flanders. He also designed prints which were published by the Antwerp publisher Hieronymus Cock.

== Life ==
Little is known about his life. Born in Deurne, Netherlands, Gassel is believed to have moved to Antwerp before 1520. Here he received his artistic training. Historiographical tradition links him to the artistic milieu of Brussels, a city which he is assumed to have moved to. The influences visible in his work link him much more to the Antwerp school of painting. On the other hand, his frequent depictions of scenes at the court point to a possible stay in Brussels where the court was located.

He was a humanist and was linked with other humanists in the Low Countries. He was a friend of Dominicus Lampsonius who included him in his 1572 publication Pictorum aliquot celebrium Germaniae inferioris effigies (literal translation: Effigies of some celebrated painters of Lower Germany), a set of 23 engraved portraits of leading artists from the Low Countries who had died.

== Work ==
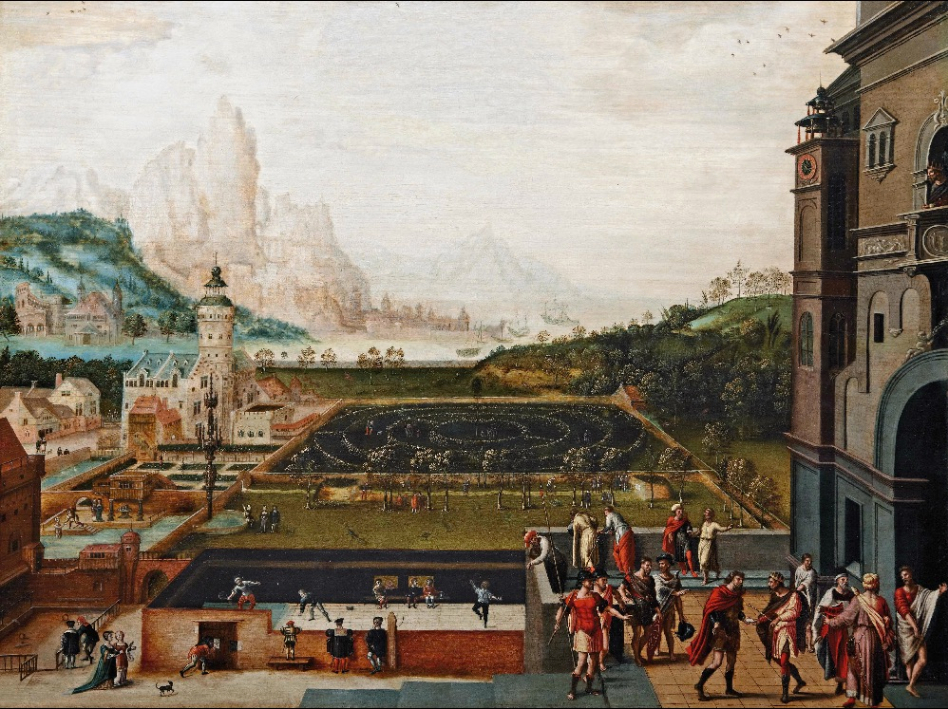
Episodes from the story of David and Bathsheba

His earliest work dates from 1538, he is known for painting landscapes and architectural studies without regard for realistic depiction. He continued in the mid-16th century the 'world landscape' tradition of wide landscape vistas created by the likes of Joachim Patinir in the Southern Netherlands. In contrast to Patinir, Gassel's landscapes are bustling with life and activity, with depictions of rivers and mountains, cityscapes with palaces and leisure gardens. Themes he painted included parables from the Bible, classical subjects, courtly leisure pursuits or everyday life. These characters are mainly pretexts to present the panoramic view in which they are included. He managed to mix fantastic rocky masses and a refined world of sweetness.

His landscapes follow the tradition established by Joachim Patinir and Herri met de Bles who structured their landscapes on a diagonal axis and using a division in three tones. Gassel's landscapes modernised this style by accentuating the graphic aspect, their preference for dull colors and the reduction of the level of detail.

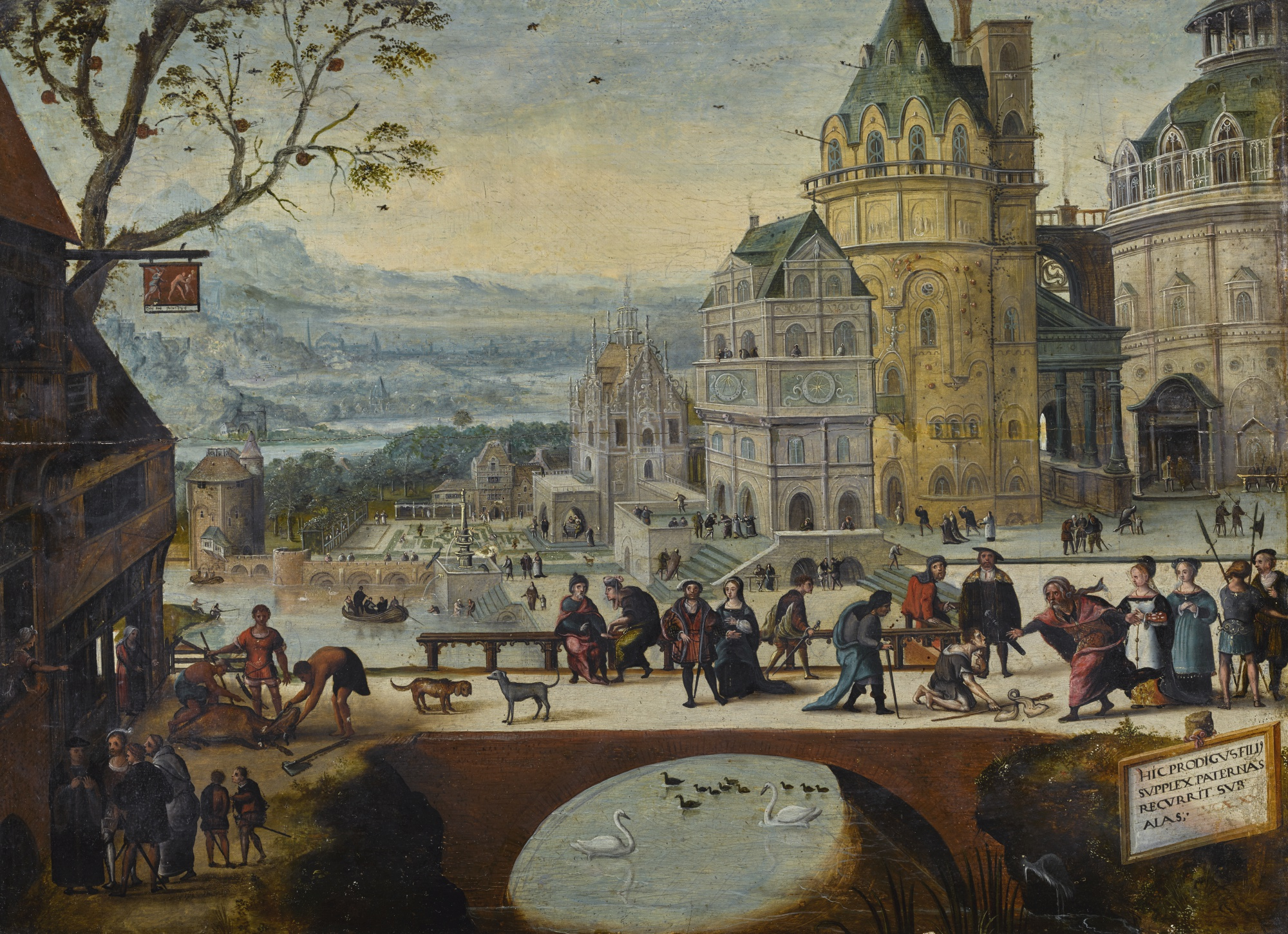
Landscape with the return of the prodigal son

Gassel painted at least four versions of episodes from the Biblical story of David and Bathsheba in the grounds of a Renaissance Palace (Wadsworth Atheneum in Hartford, the collection of the Duke of Palmela in Lisbon, the collection of Doctor Restrelli and at De Jonckheere Gallery in 2018). In addition to various scenes depicting the Biblical story, the paintings also depict entertainments and games popular at royal courts in the 16th century. In the foreground can be seen one of the first depictions of tennis in European art. Other games portrayed in the paintings are boule á l’anneau (hoop ball), which involves hitting a ball under hoops using a wooden stick, a forerunner of croquet.

In the Episodes from the story of David and Bathsheba, steep cliffs can be seen and was a constant motif in several of his paintings; it showed similarities to works by Herri met de Bles, whom he may have influenced and who may have been his pupil in the early 1530s and was at least 10 years his junior. Gassel and de Bles are depicted together (along with Hans Holbein) in a 1764 coloured engraving by Jan l'Admiral.
