= Van Overbeek =

van Overbeek is a surname. Notable people with the surname include:

- Bonaventura van Overbeek (1660–1705), Dutch Golden Age draughtsman and engraver
- Elvio van Overbeek (born 1994), Dutch footballer
- Johannes van Overbeek (born 1973), American racing driver
