= Jacob Christoph Le Blon =

Painter and engraver from Frankfurt

- Born: Jacob Christoph Le Blon; 2 May 1667; Frankfurt am Main
- Died: 16 May 1741 (aged 74); Paris

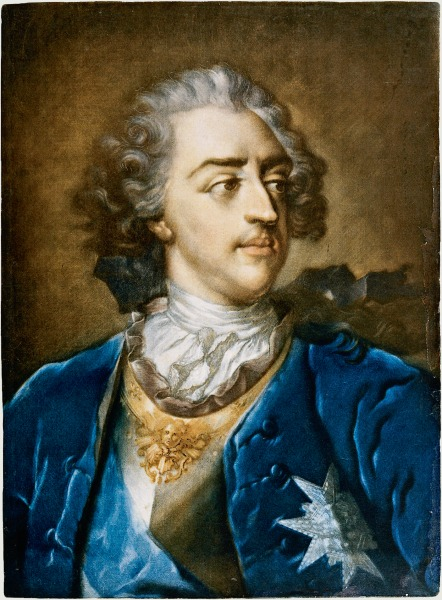
4-colour mezzotint of Louis XV by Le Blon, 1739

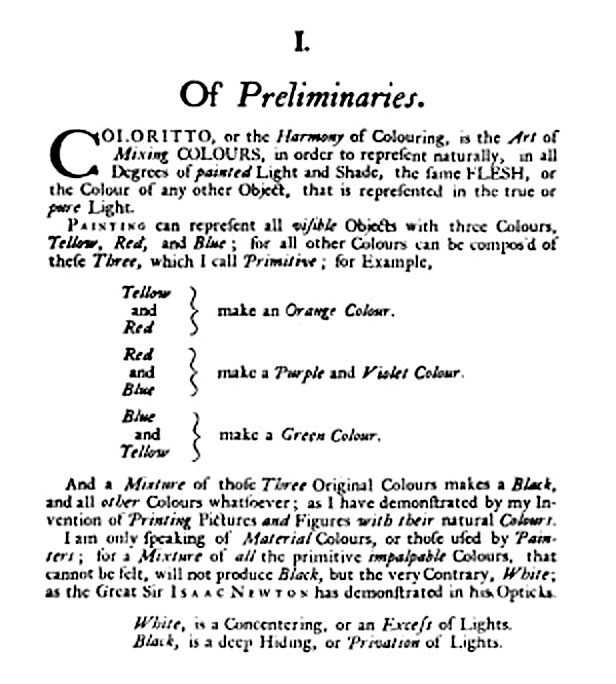
Page from Le Blon's 1725 Coloritto describing his RYB three-color printing process

Jacob Christoph Le Blon, or Jakob Christoffel Le Blon, (2 May 1667 – 16 May 1741) was a painter and engraver from Frankfurt who invented a halftone color printing system with three and four copper dyes using an RYB color model, which served as the foundation for the modern CMYK system. He used the mezzotint method to engrave three or four copper plates (one each per printing ink) to make prints of paintings and portraits with a wide range of colors.

== Biography ==
On his father's side Le Blon descended from Huguenots who fled France in 1576, settling in Frankfurt. He belonged to a family of printers and booksellers who focused on travel books. His father, Christophe Le Blon, was an engraver and bookseller in Frankfurt am Main. His grandfather, Christof Le Blon, married Susanna Barbara Merian, daughter of the artist and engraver Matthäus Merian (1593–1650). Le Blon is reported to have received training as a young man from the Swiss painter and engraver Conrad Ferdinand Meyer (1618–1689) in Zurich but there is no documentary evidence to confirm the conclusion.

Le Blon trained in Rome from 1696 until 1702 where he studied art and mezzotint engraving under the painter Carlo Maratta (1625–1713). There, he became acquainted with the Dutch painter and engraver Bonaventura van Overbeek. Encouraged by van Overbeek, Le Blon moved to Amsterdam in 1702 where he began working as a miniature painter and engraver.

In 1707, Le Blon issued a short publication in Dutch on the forms of the human body. During his time as a miniature painter, he began experimenting with color printing. His system used three different plates, each inked with a different color and applied in sequence to a single sheet of paper. In 1710 he made his first color prints with yellow, red, and blue plates. He also became acquainted with Arnold Houbraken, who quoted him as a source of information on German painters for his Schouburg, later published after Houbraken's death in 1718. Around 1715, he moved to London, where he continued his experiments. He eventually received royal patents for the three-color printing process in 1719 from George I. He founded his business, named The Picture Office, and sold copies of pictures of famous people and paintings from notable artists. However, the company failed as a business venture in 1725.

In 1725 he published Coloritto, in French and English. In the book, Le Blon asserted that "the art of mixing colours…(in) painting can represent all visible objects with three colours: yellow, red and blue; for all colours can be composed of these three, which I call Primitive." Le Blon added that red and yellow make orange; red and blue, make purple/violet; and blue and yellow make green. In contrast to Newton's additive color theory, Le Blon proposed that any color could be achieved by combining varying amounts of red, yellow, blue, and black. Although the idea was not new, Le Blon helped disseminate it.

While Le Blon was a part of The Picture Office, he also began experimenting with color tapestry weaving. The tapestry process involved using white, yellow, red, blue, and black fibers to create images. He received a second patent in 1727 for this process, and he formed another enterprise to produce these tapestries. Although Le Blon received acclaim from esteemed people such as Cromwell Mortimer and Sir Richard Manningham, his tapestry business was even less successful than his previous endeavor, shutting down in the 1730s.

Le Blon left England in 1734 and moved to Paris, where he received a privilège (patent) for his printing process from Louis XV. His works were much more popular in France, and several sequences of prints were produced and sold showing the different steps of his printing process, such as a portrait of the French Cardinal de Fleury. His company was still not very profitable, however, at the time of his death in 1741. His former student, Jacques-Fabien Gautier d'Agoty, argued that Le Blon was not a legitimate color printer, and he claimed Le Blon's privilège for himself, naming himself the inventor of color printing.

== Contribution to color printing ==
=== Modern color printing ===
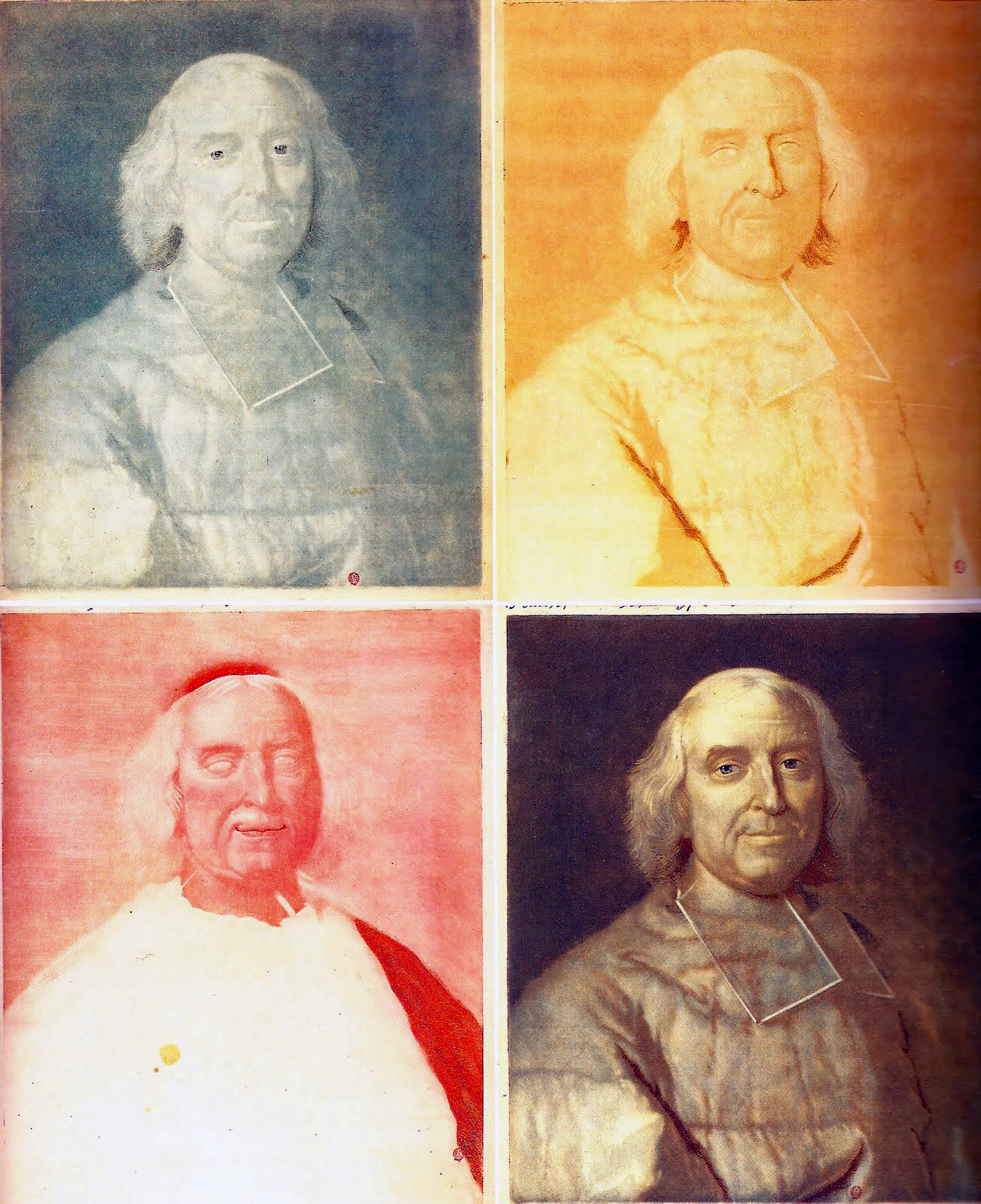
Separate prints of four plates: indigo, yellow, carmine, and bistre from a halftone color engraving by Jacob Christoph Le Blon (1738) after a painting by Hyacinthe Rigaud of Cardinal Fleury.

While Newton's color theory introduced additive primary colors of red, yellow, and blue, Le Blon suggested that the same primary colors in painting resulted in subtractive color. While this theory proved to be slightly off, his writings were essential for future color printing and the modern day CMYK color model.

In terms of color printing techniques, Le Blon's methods were largely unsuccessful and forgotten by the mid-19th Century. Le Blon's color printing method required experience in deconstructing a colored image into its presumed primary components and understanding the effects of superimposing printing inks in certain areas, for which extensive trial and error was required. His full-color reproductions were reproduced from three mezzotint plates of red, yellow and blue ink. He used one color per plate. Later in Le Blon's career, he often added a black and white plates. However, his printing methods had problems, many stemming from his preference for large paintings. He required large (and expensive) copper plates for engraving, large printing presses, and lots of color and coloring materials. In addition, these large paintings required extensive hand-finishing.

Despite these problems, Le Blon's efforts helped integrate the fields of painting and printing. His methods eventually shifted in the early-mid-19th century into chromolithography. What was required, however, was a methodology to break images objectively into color components which became possible with the invention of color photography in the second half of the 19th century and the invention of halftone printing in the late 19th century.

=== Skin color ===
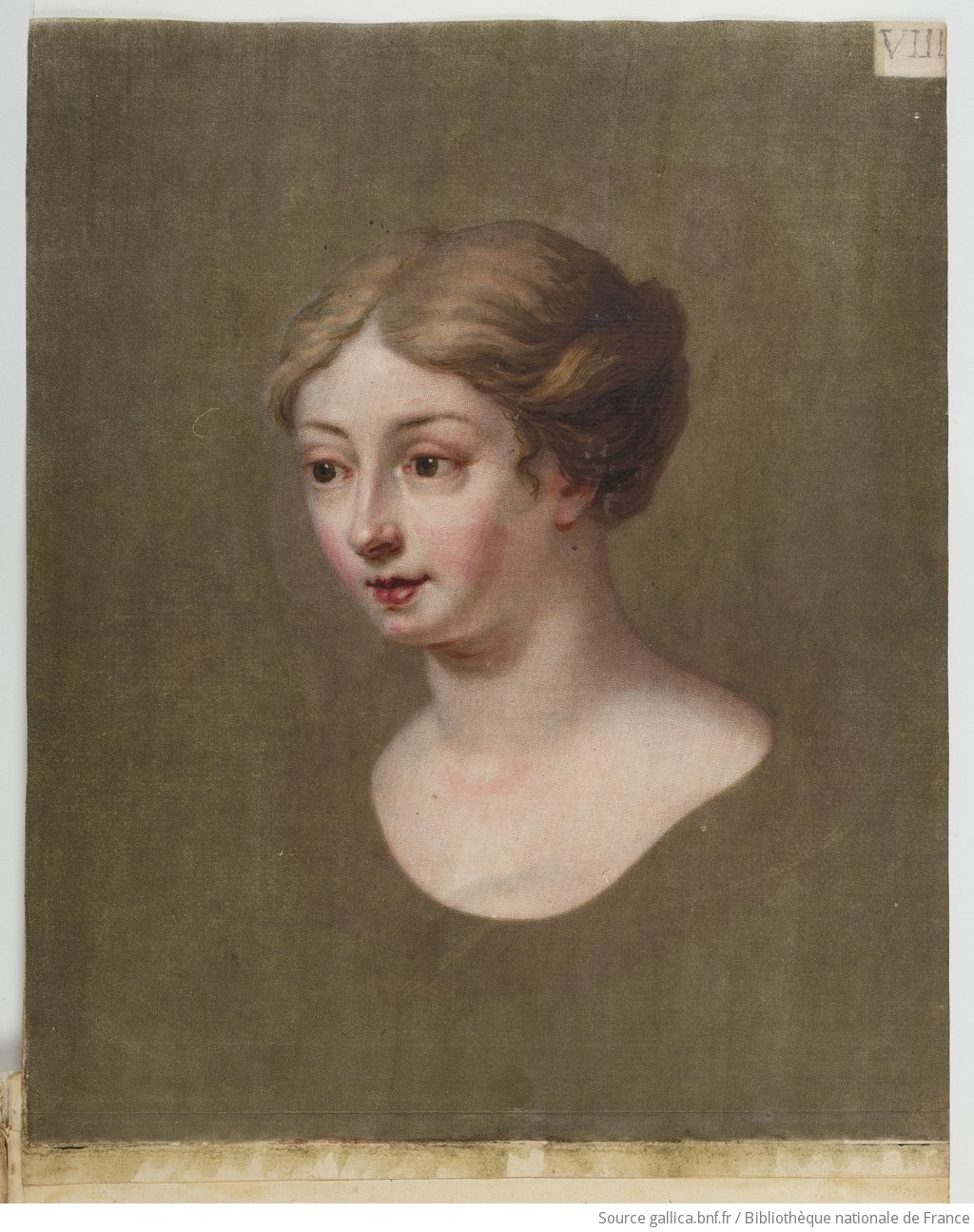
Finding the right shade of skin tone, test No. 6, Print by Le Bon

Le Blon wrote extensively on skin color in his book Coloritto, and this discussion was used to explain his process of color printing as well. He believed that painting flesh was the mark of a good painter, saying, "When a Painter says, that such Artists make a good Coloritto, he means, that they represent truly and naturally the Nude or the naked human Flesh; supposing they can paint all other visible Objects well, and without Difficulty." Le Blon explained that this process was best achieved through adding different layers of color, starting with white, then black, then the other colors such as red, yellow, etc. With the addition of further colors, Le Blon argued that these paintings came to life. Le Blon used this process to portray flesh in his printed paintings, but his method of printing flesh tones was only used in medical printing by his students, including D'Agoty and Jan L'Admiral.
