= Landscape with Charon Crossing the Styx =

Painting by Joachim Patinir

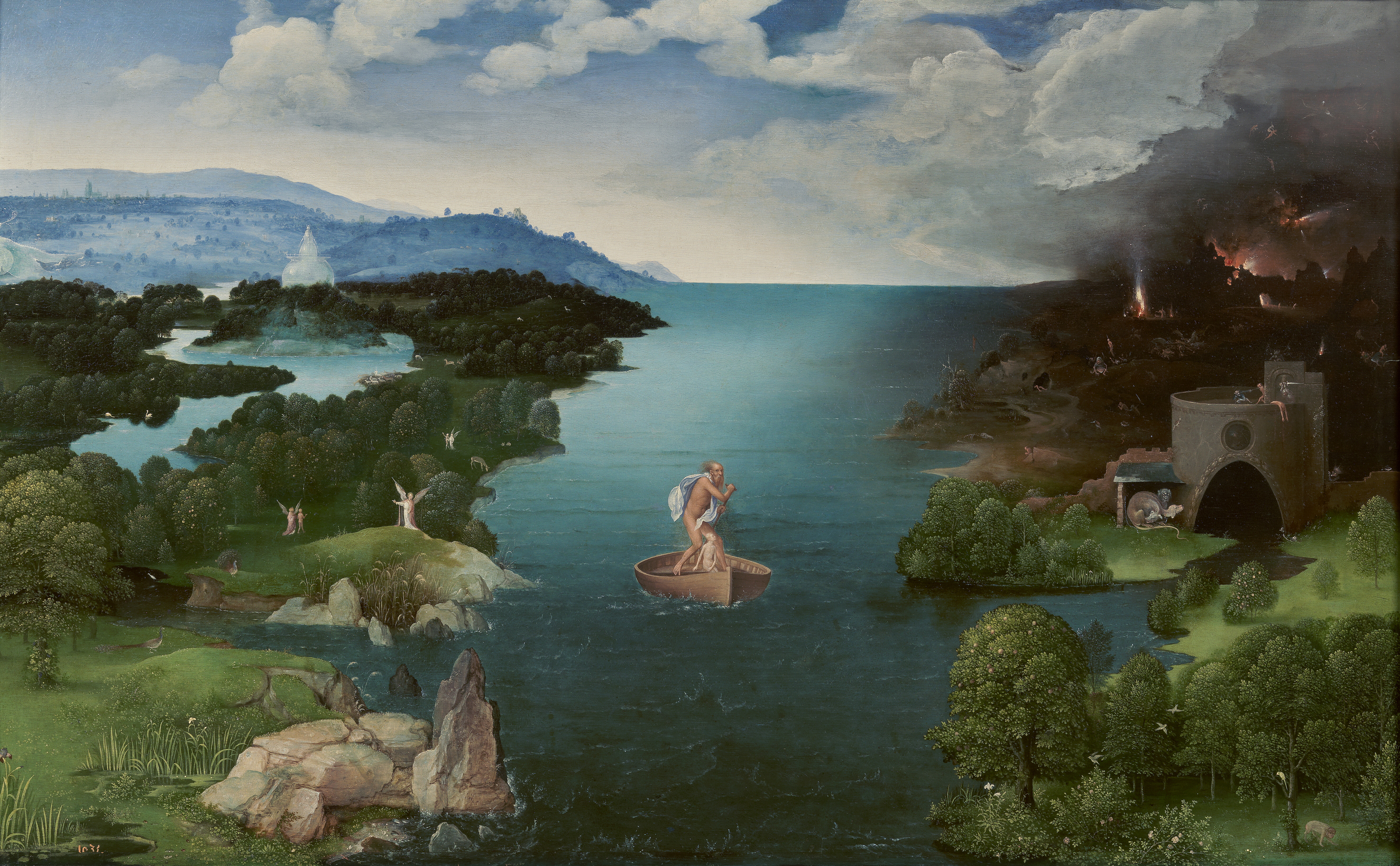
- Artist: Joachim Patinir
- Year: c. 1515–1524
- Medium: Oil on wood
- Dimensions: 64 cm × 103 cm (25 in × 41 in)
- Location: Museo del Prado, Madrid

Landscape with Charon Crossing the Styx is an oil on wood painting by the Flemish Northern Renaissance artist Joachim Patinir. Dating to c. 1515–1524, it is now in the Museo del Prado, in Madrid.

Landscape with Charon Crossing Styx fits into common Northern Renaissance and early Mannerist trends of art. The 16th century witnessed a new era for painting in Germany and the Netherlands that combined influences from local traditions and foreign influences. Many artists, including Patinir, traveled to Italy to study and these travels provided new ideas, particularly concerning representations of the natural world. Patinir's religious subjects, therefore, incorporate precise observation and naturalism with fantastic landscapes inspired by the northern traditions of Bosch.

== Iconography ==
It depicts the classical subject related by Virgil in his Aeneid (book 6, line 369) and Dante in the Inferno (canto 3, line 78) at the centre of the picture within the Christian traditions of the Last Judgment and the Ars moriendi. The larger figure in the boat is Charon, who transports the souls of the dead to the gates of Hades. The passenger in the boat, too minute to distinguish his expressions, is a human soul deciding between Heaven, to his right (the viewer's left), or Hell, to his left. The river Styx divides the painting down the centre. It is one of the four rivers of the underworld that passes through the deepest part of hell. On the painting's left side is the fountain of Paradise, the spring from which the river Lethe flows through Heaven.

On the right side of the composition is Patinir's vision of Hell, drawing largely on Boschian influences. He adapts a description of Hades, in which, according to the Greek writer Pausanias, one of the gates was located at the southern end of the Peloponnesus, in an inlet still visible on the Cape Matapan. In front of the gates is Cerberus, a three-headed dog, who guards the entrance of the gate and frightens all the potential souls who enter into Hades. The soul in the boat ultimately chooses his destiny by looking toward Hell and ignoring the angel on the river-bank in Paradise that beckons him to the more difficult path to Heaven.

== Composition and colour ==
Patinir utilised a Weltlandschaft ("world landscape") composition with a three-colour scheme typical of his work, moving from brown in the foreground, to bluish-green, to pale blue in the background). This format, which Patiner is widely acknowledged as popularising, provides a bird's-eye view over an expansive landscape. Furthermore, the painting uses colour to visibly depict heaven and hell, good and evil. To the viewer's left is a heavenly place with bright blue skies, crystal blue rivers with a luminous fountain and angels accenting the grassy hills. On the far right of the painting is a dark sky engulfing Hell and the hanged figures on its gate. Fires blaze in the hills. The foreground of the painting consists of brown rocks in Heaven and brown burnt trees in Hell.

In the middle-ground is the river and the grasslands in bright hues of blue and green. The background, which is cut off by the horizon line of the darker blue river, is a pale blue sky highlighted with white and gray clouds. This compositional form is applied here by the crowded left and right sides bracketed by hills, which pushes the viewer's eye into the open space in the middle and reinforces that the men in the boat are the main focus of the painting.
