= Jan l'Admiral =

Dutch engraver (1699–1773)

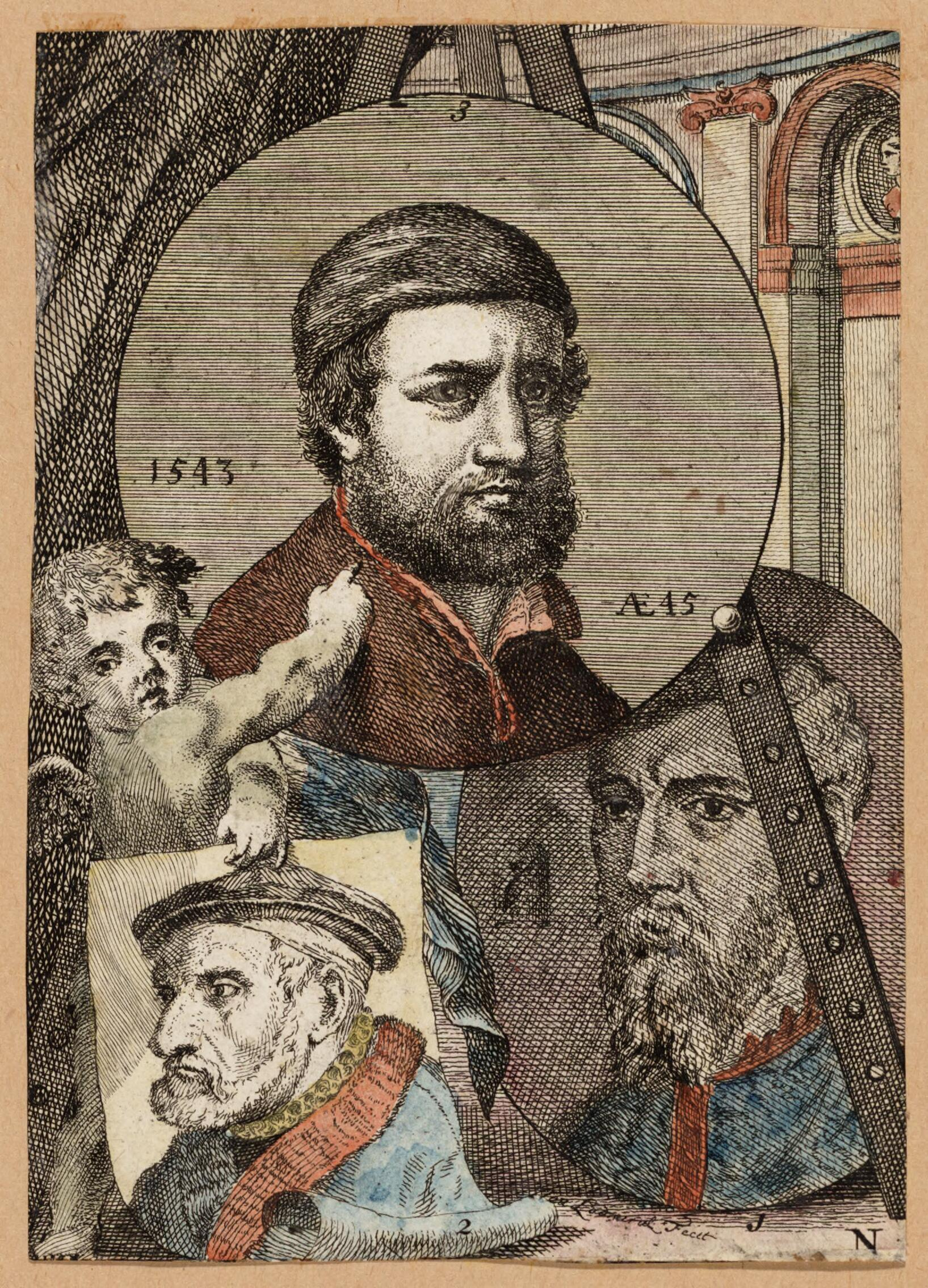
Hendrik met de Bles, Lucas Gassel and Hans Holbein the Younger, illustration for the 1604 book, Schilderboeck

Jan l'Admiral (1699–1773) was an 18th-century engraver from the Dutch Republic.

== Biography ==
He was born in Amsterdam to an engraver of the same name and is known for a series of engravings for a new edition of Karel van Mander's Schilderboeck published by Steven van Esveldt in 1764. He was the brother of Jacob (1700–1770), and he is documented as a pupil of Jacob Christoph Le Blon, who taught him color printing.

He died in Amsterdam.
