= Rest on the Flight into Egypt (Patinir) =

Painting by Joachim Patinir

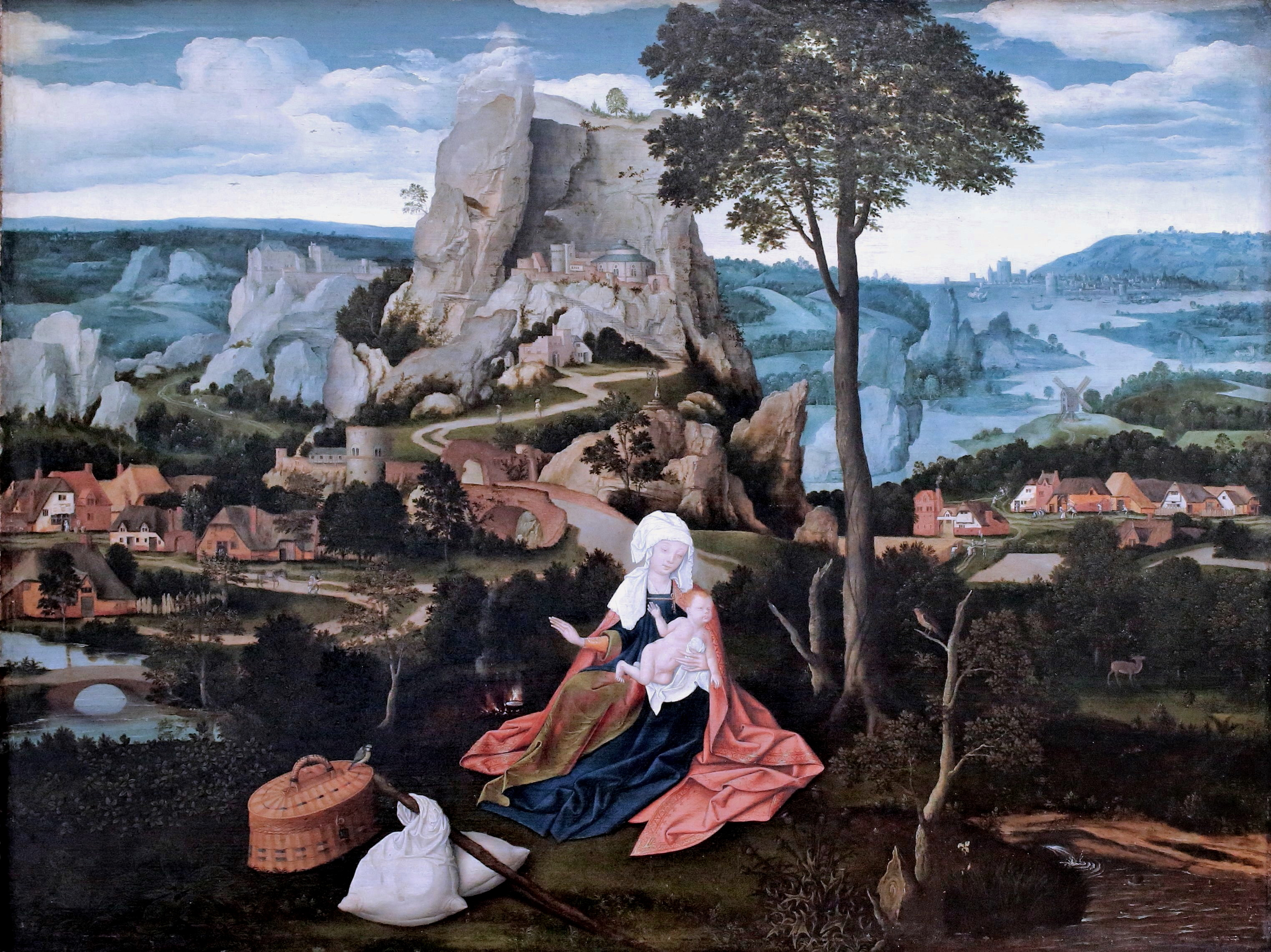
Rest on the Flight into Egypt (c. 1515) by Joachim Patinir

Rest on the Flight into Egypt is a c. 1515 oil on panel painting by the Flemish artist Joachim Patinir, who painted the main figures of Madonna and Child and a foreground still-life. The background landscape includes colours not usually found in Patinir's work and so is thought to have been produced by other hands. It is now in the Gemäldegalerie, Berlin.

== Bibliography ==
- (in French) Paul Dupouey, Le Temps chez Patinir, le paradoxe du paysage classique : thèse de doctorat, Université de Nancy II, 2007-2008, 533 p.
- Reindert L. Falkenburg, Joachim Patinir : Landscape as an image of the pilgrimage of life, Amsterdam and Philadelphia, John Benjamins Publishing Company, 1988.
- (in French) Godfridus Johannes Hoogewerff, « Joachim Patinir en Italie », Revue de l'Art, vol. XLV, 1928, p. 131-132.
- Robert A. Koch, Joachim Patinir, Princeton, Princeton University Press, 1968, 116 p. (ISBN 978-0691038261)
- (in French) Alain Tapié (ed.), Fables du paysage flamand; Bosch, Bles, Brueghel, Bril, Paris, Somogy éditions d'art, 2012, 368 p. (ISBN 978-2-7572-0582-2)
- (in Spanish) Alejandro Vergara (ed.), Patinir, estudios y catálogo crítico, Madrid, Museo National del Prado, 2007, 408 p. (ISBN 978-84-8480-119-1)
- (in French) Guy de Tervarent, Attributs et symboles dans l'art profane. Dictionnaire d'un langage perdu (1450-1600), Genève, Droz, 1997, 588 p. (ISBN 2-600-00507-2)
