= World landscape =

Type of composition in Western painting

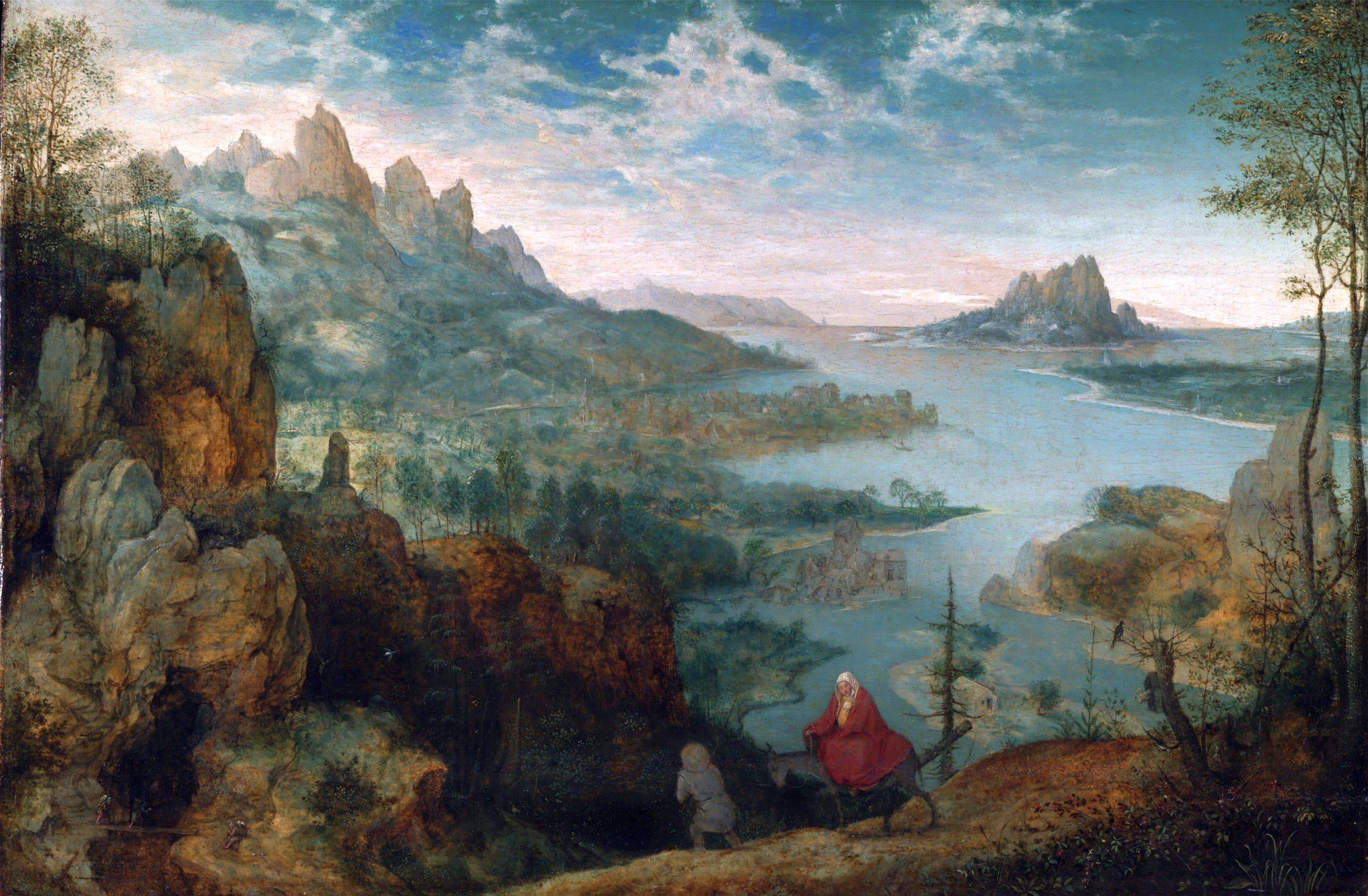
Pieter Bruegel the Elder, Landscape with the Flight into Egypt, 1563, 37.1 × 55.6 cm (14.6 × 21.9 in)

The world landscape, a translation of the German Weltlandschaft, is a type of composition in Western painting showing an imaginary panoramic landscape seen from an elevated viewpoint that includes mountains and lowlands, water, and buildings. The subject of each painting is usually a Biblical or historical narrative, but the figures comprising this narrative element are dwarfed by their surroundings.

The world landscape first appeared in painting in the work of the Early Netherlandish painter Joachim Patinir (c. 1480–1524), most of whose few surviving paintings are of this type, usually showing religious subjects, but commissioned by secular patrons. "They were imaginary compilations of the most appealing and spectacular aspects of European geography, assembled for the delight of the wealthy armchair traveler", giving "an idealized composite of the world taken in at a single Olympian glance".

The compositional type was taken up by a number of other Netherlandish artists, most famously Pieter Bruegel the Elder. There was a parallel development by Patinir's contemporary Albrecht Altdorfer and other artists of the Danube school. Although compositions of this broad type continued to be common until the 18th century and beyond, the term is usually only used to describe works from the Low Countries and Germany produced in the 16th century. The German term Weltlandschaft was first used by Eberhard Freiherr von Bodenhausen in 1905 with reference to Gerard David, and then in 1918 applied to Patinir's work by Ludwig von Baldass, defined as the depiction of "all that which seemed beautiful to the eye; the sea and the earth, mountains and plains, forests and fields, the castle and the hut".

== Netherlands ==
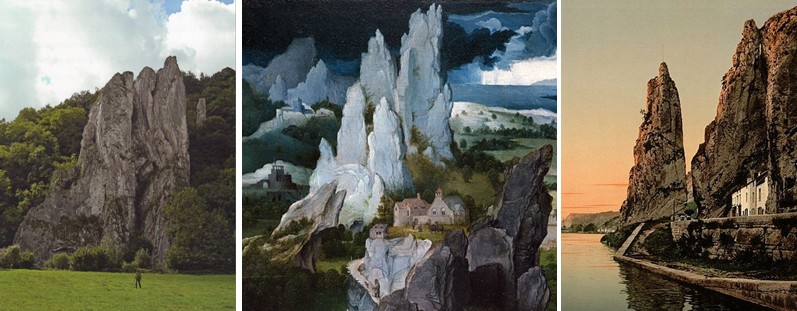
Detail from Patinir's St Jerome (National Gallery), between formations in the vicinity of Dinant.

The treatment of landscape backgrounds in Early Netherlandish painting was greatly admired in Italy, and Flemish specialists were employed in some Italian workshops, including that of Titian. The backgrounds to many of Albrecht Dürer's early prints were appropriated by a number of Italian artists. Patinir, "emboldened by the Italian taste for Northern rusticity, began as early as the 1510s to expand the backgrounds of his paintings out of all proportion" in a way that "violently reversed the ordinary hierarchy of subject and setting". By 1520 he was well known for these subjects, and when Dürer visited him in Antwerp he described him in his diary as "the good painter of landscapes" (gut landschaftsmaler) in the first use of Landschaft in an artistic context.

The paintings are relatively small and use a horizontal format; this was to become so standard for landscapes in art that it is now called "landscape" format in ordinary contexts, but at the time it was a considerable novelty, as "portable panel paintings were almost always vertical in format before 1520" and "Patinir's landscapes were among the first small horizontal panels of any sort". He typically uses three base colours to articulate his compositions, with a brownish foreground, a blue-green middle zone, and blues in the distance. The horizon-line is relatively high on the picture plane. Patinir (and Herri met de Bles) came from Dinant on the Meuse (in modern Belgium) where, in "a startlingly un-Netherlandish landscape", there are dramatic rock cliffs and free-standing crags along the river. These are frequently recalled in his paintings, and came to form a common feature of works by other artists.

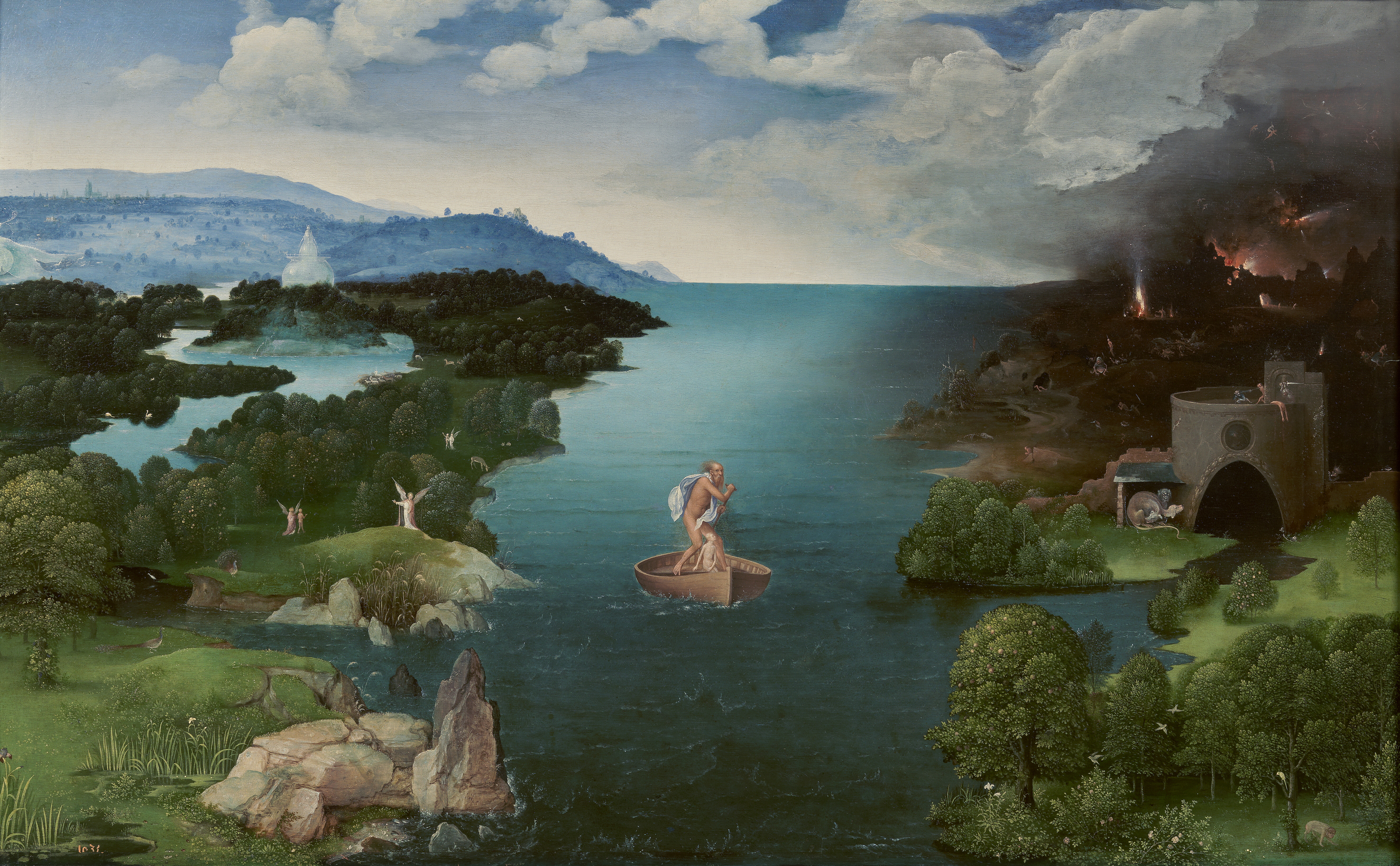
Landscape with Charon Crossing the Styx, Joachim Patinir, c. 1515–1524, Prado

With other vertical features, these are painted as though seen straight on even when in the lower parts of the landscape, and thus "reassert the integrity of the picture plane" in his works, against the sprawling horizontal impetus of the main landscape. Both Kenneth Clark and Simon Schama see these as "the last survivors of the landscape of symbols", relating them to medieval and even earlier "corkscrew" representations of mountains.

The style is related to the landscape backgrounds of Hieronymous Bosch, although in his main works these function as a backdrop to his crowds of figures and are not as concerned to include a variety of landscape elements; but those of smaller works such as his St. Jerome at Prayer anticipate the new style. In most respects the paintings retain the same elements as many 15th-century treatments of the same subjects but show, in modern cinematic terms, a long shot rather than a medium shot.

Most art historians regard the figure subject as continuing to be important in the works of Patinir and his followers, rather than mere staffage for a landscape, and most are of subjects where a wide landscape had relevance. Among the most popular were the Flight to Egypt, and the Netherlandish 15th-century innovation of the Rest on the Flight to Egypt, and subjects showing hermits such as Saints Jerome and Anthony with the world from which they had withdrawn laid out beneath them. As well as connecting the style to the Age of Discovery, the role of Antwerp as a booming centre both of world trade and cartography, and the wealthy town-dweller's view of the countryside, art historians have explored the paintings as religious metaphors for the pilgrimage of life.

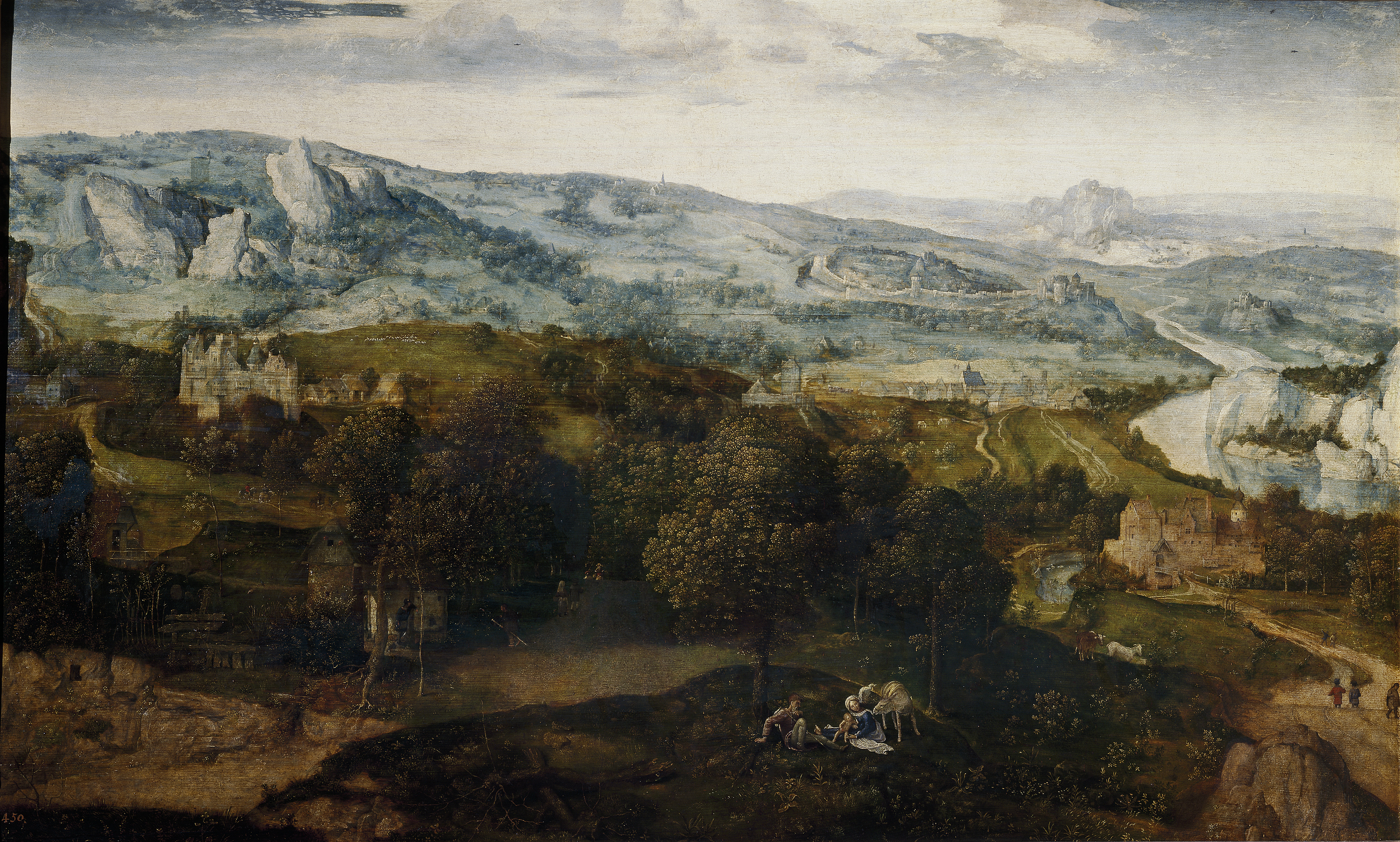
Rest on the Flight into Egypt, Cornelis Massys, c. 1540

The style is also an early example of the 16th-century artistic trend to "Mannerist inversion" (the term devised by Max Dvořák) or the "inverted composition", where previously minor or background elements come to dominate the picture space. In the 1550s Pieter Aertsen began a style of large canvasses dominated by great spreads of food still life and large genre figures of cooks or market-sellers, while in the background small biblical scenes can be glimpsed. Some paintings by Jan Sanders van Hemessen place genre figures in the foreground of paintings on religious or moral subjects. In the 17th century all these subject areas became established as independent genres in Dutch and Flemish painting, and later throughout Western painting.

Patinir's invention was developed by Herri met de Bles (1510 – c.1555–1560), who was probably his nephew. He took the type into the new style of Northern Mannerism. Other artists were Lucas Gassel, the Brunswick Monogrammist, and Cornelis Massys.

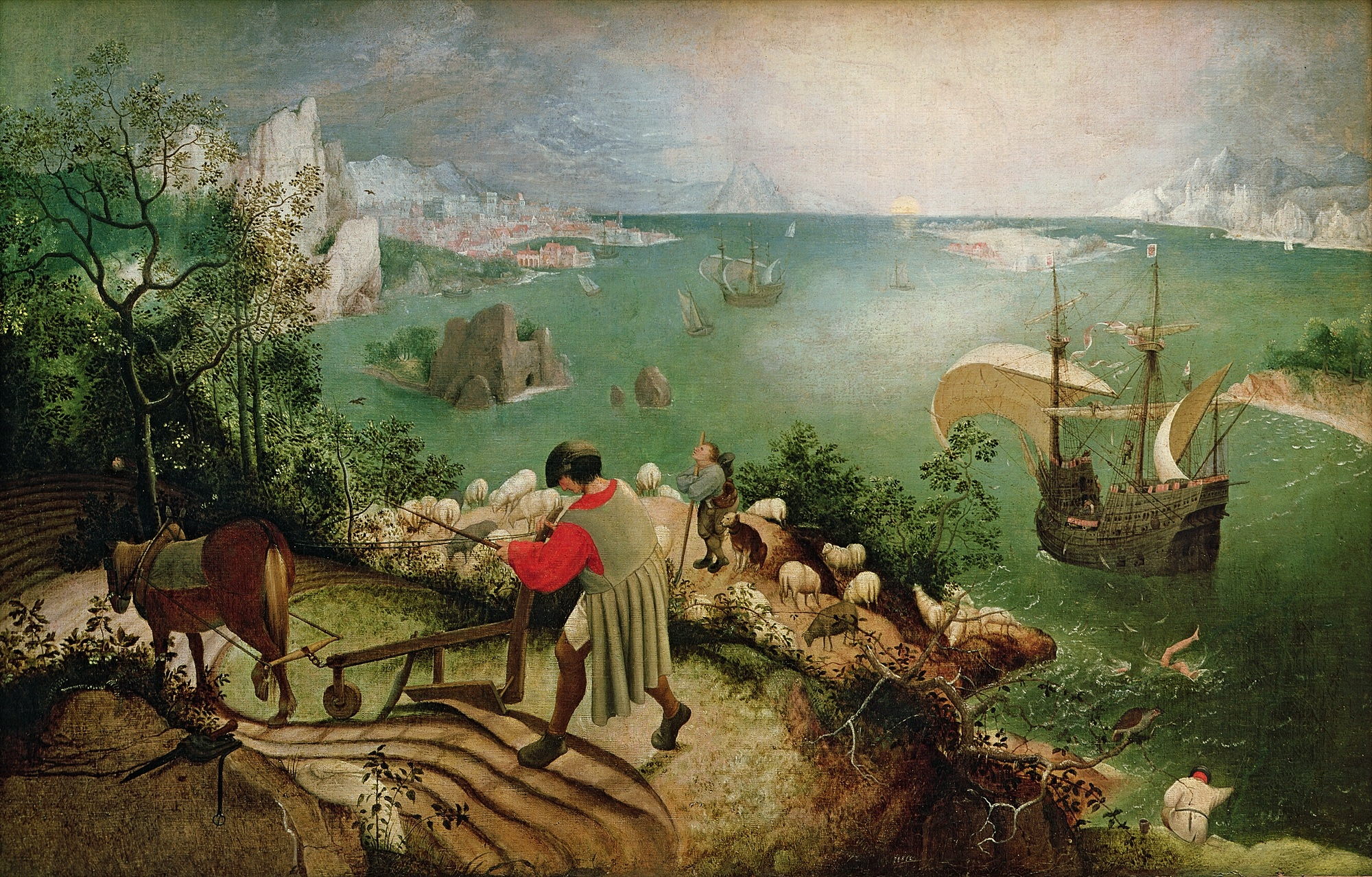
Landscape with the Fall of Icarus, Royal Museums of Fine Arts of Belgium, now seen as a good early copy of Bruegel's original

Massys was the son of Quentin Massys, a friend of Patinir, who had added the figures to at least one Patinir landscape, the Temptation of St Anthony (Prado), and who had used the style in some of his own works, such as a Madonna and Child (1513) in Poznań. Patinir increasingly left the larger figures in his works to other masters, and also seems to have had a large workshop or circle of followers in Antwerp.

The style was adopted and made more natural in the landscapes of Pieter Brueghel the Elder, who had travelled to Italy via the Alps. Back in Antwerp he was commissioned in the 1550s by the publisher Hieronymus Cock to make drawings for a series of engravings, the Large Landscapes, to meet what was now a growing demand for landscape images. Some of his earlier paintings, such as his Landscape with the Flight into Egypt (Courtauld, 1563, illustrated at top), are fully within the Patinir conventions, but his Landscape with the Fall of Icarus (known from two copies) had a Patinir-style landscape, but already the largest figure was a genre figure and not part of the supposed narrative subject.

Other works explored variations on the theme, with his famous set of landscapes with genre figures depicting the seasons being the culmination of his style; the five surviving paintings use the basic elements of the world landscape (only one lacks craggy mountains) but transform them into his own style. They are larger than most previous works, with a genre scene with several figures in the foreground, and the panoramic view seen past or through trees. Bruegel was also aware of the Danube landscape style through prints.

== Danube school ==
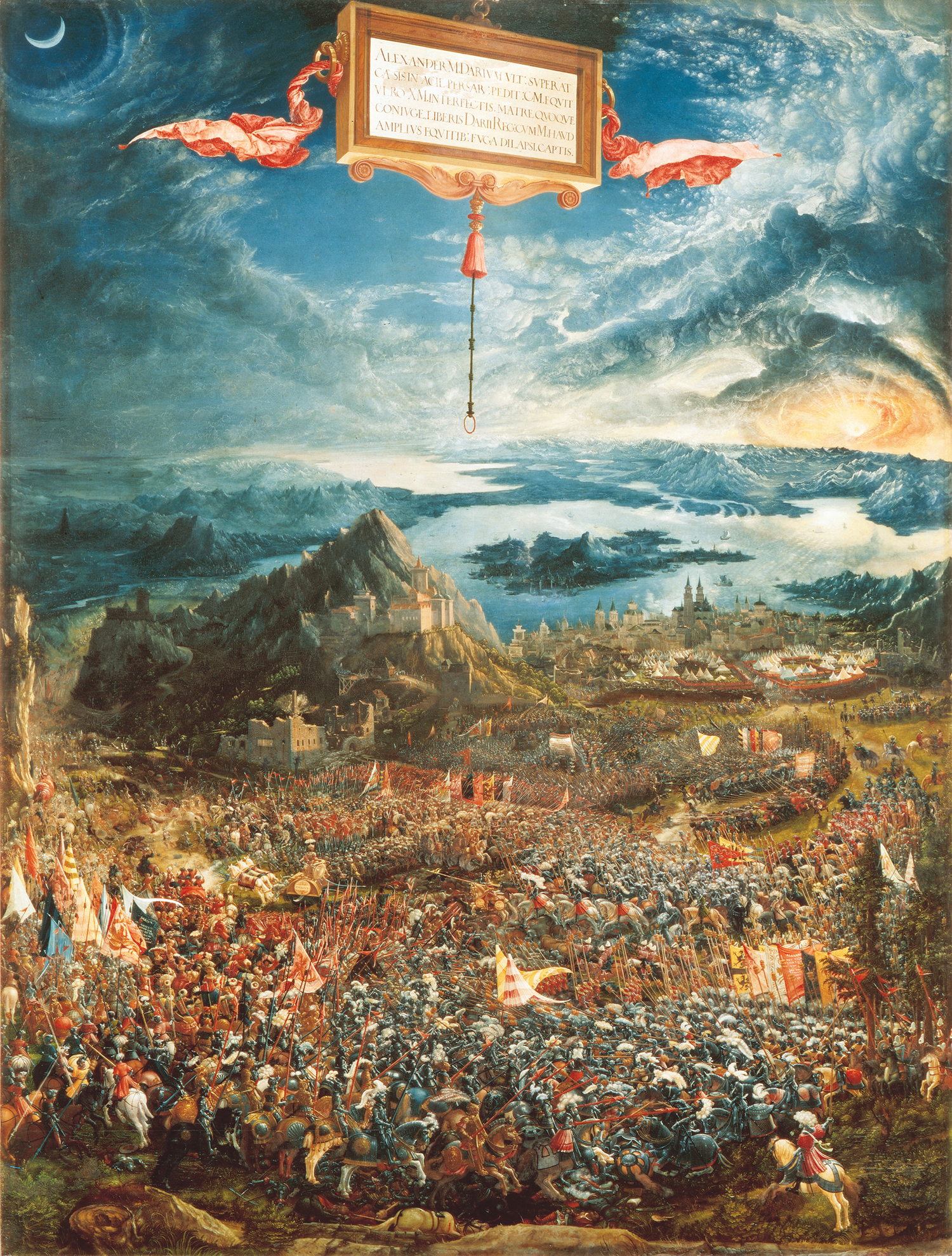
Albrecht Altdorfer, The Battle of Alexander at Issus, 1529, 158.4 cm × 120.3 cm (62.4 in × 47.4 in)

The Danube school was a contemporary group of German and Austrian artists who were also pioneers of landscape painting, and the first to regularly paint pure landscapes without figures. Their landscapes revel in the forests of the Upper Danube, and the place of a foreground figure is often taken by a single tree, a formula invented by Albrecht Altdorfer, the most significant artist of the group, and used, mostly in drawings and prints, by Wolf Huber and Augustin Hirschvogel. Other innovative works showed close-up views of dense forest with hardly any distant view or even sky. But many of their landscapes are panoramic in a version of the Netherlandish style, although the river winding out of sight normally replaces the sea that occupies the horizon of many Netherlandish works. It is probable that at least Altdorfer had seen a Patinir by about 1531; one was in Augsburg from 1517 (an Assumption now in Philadelphia).

Altdorfer's painted landscapes are usually vertical, and, if only because it was commissioned for a vertical space, this is the case for the most extreme of all large world landscapes, his The Battle of Alexander at Issus (1529, Munich). This extraordinary painting shows a view right across the Mediterranean, with a mass of tiny figures fighting a great battle in the foreground. They are in modern Turkey, and the view extends beyond the island of Cyprus to the coast of Egypt and the Sinai Peninsula and the Red Sea. The painting originally formed one part of a set of historical paintings in the same format.

== Influence on later landscape painting ==
Both the Netherlandish and Danubian approaches to landscape painting were greatly influential for later artists. Later generations of Flemish artists such as Jan Brueghel the Elder, Anton Mirou, Lucas van Valkenborch and Gillis van Coninxloo continued to produce late Mannerist versions of the full formula, as developed by Pieter Bruegel the Elder, before in the 1590s van Coninxloo let the trees move in like curtains from the sides to restrict and then eliminate a distant view, pioneering the Flemish development of the dense forest views of the Danube school. Rubens had studied in the 1590s with his relative Tobias Verhaecht, an especially conservative artist who continued to use world landscape styles derived from Pieter Bruegel the Elder until the 1620s. Though Rubens rapidly outgrew his influence, in some of his later landscapes, such as the Summer, Peasants going to Market (c. 1618, Royal Collection), "the tradition of the old 'world landscape' plainly lives on".

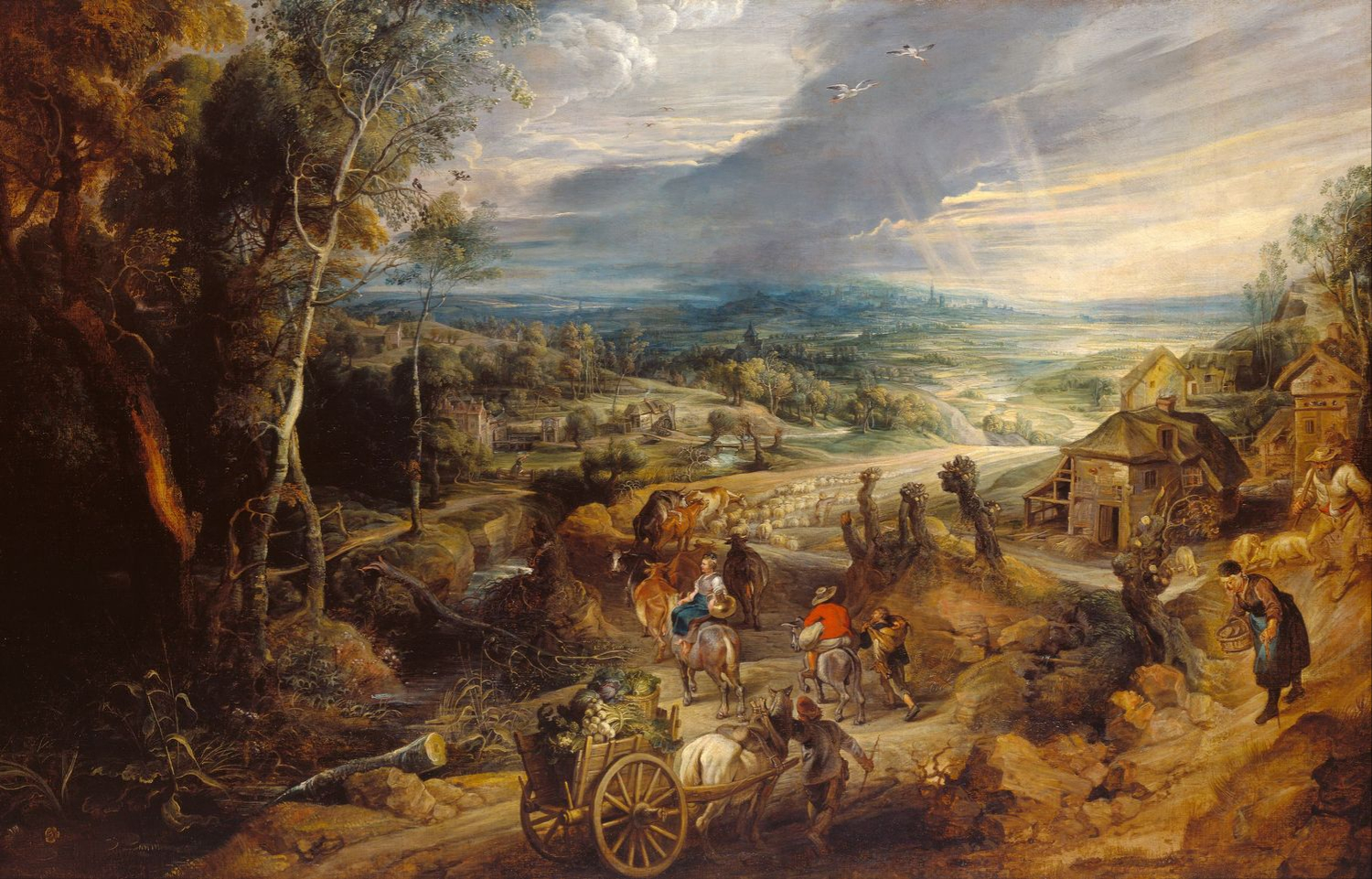
Summer, Peasants going to Market, Peter Paul Rubens, c. 1618

Aspects of the particular formula of the world landscape, though no longer usually described by that term, continue to reappear in different versions until the 19th century. In Dutch Golden Age painting the idiosyncratic paintings and prints of Hercules Seghers (c. 1589 – c. 1638), as rare as Patinirs, were great panoramic views, very often with mountains. In contrast, Philips Koninck (1619–1688) used the panoramic elevated view, and often included water, but showed vistas of flat farmland or town roofs with a low horizon.

The Italian Niccolò dell'Abbate, part of the School of Fontainebleau, introduced the Flemish world landscape into French art in works such as the Orpheus and Euridice in the National Gallery, London and the Rape of Proserpine in the Louvre, both large paintings. In French Baroque or classical painting many artists including both Claude Lorrain and Nicolas Poussin painted "Landscape with ..." subjects, and for Claude wide panoramic views with mixed elements of mountains, water and small figures formed the bulk of his work, although both the viewpoint and horizon are generally much lower than in 16th-century works. Claude in turn became enormously influential, and until the early 19th century his style continued to have the advantage of giving a painting of a "landscape with" a higher place in the hierarchy of genres, and consequently a higher price, than a mere pure landscape.

With Romanticism this changed, but panoramic views continued to be painted in the 19th century, and artists such as those in the Hudson River School, Edward Lear and Russian landscape painters took the compositional style to new landscapes around the world in works such as The Heart of the Andes (1859, Frederic Edwin Church), though often excluding all people and buildings. These still featured in the huge apocalyptic religious paintings of the English painter John Martin, which are often literally "end of the world landscapes", taking the history of the genre back to its origins with Bosch.
