= The Baptism of Christ (Patinir) =

Painting by Joachim Patinir

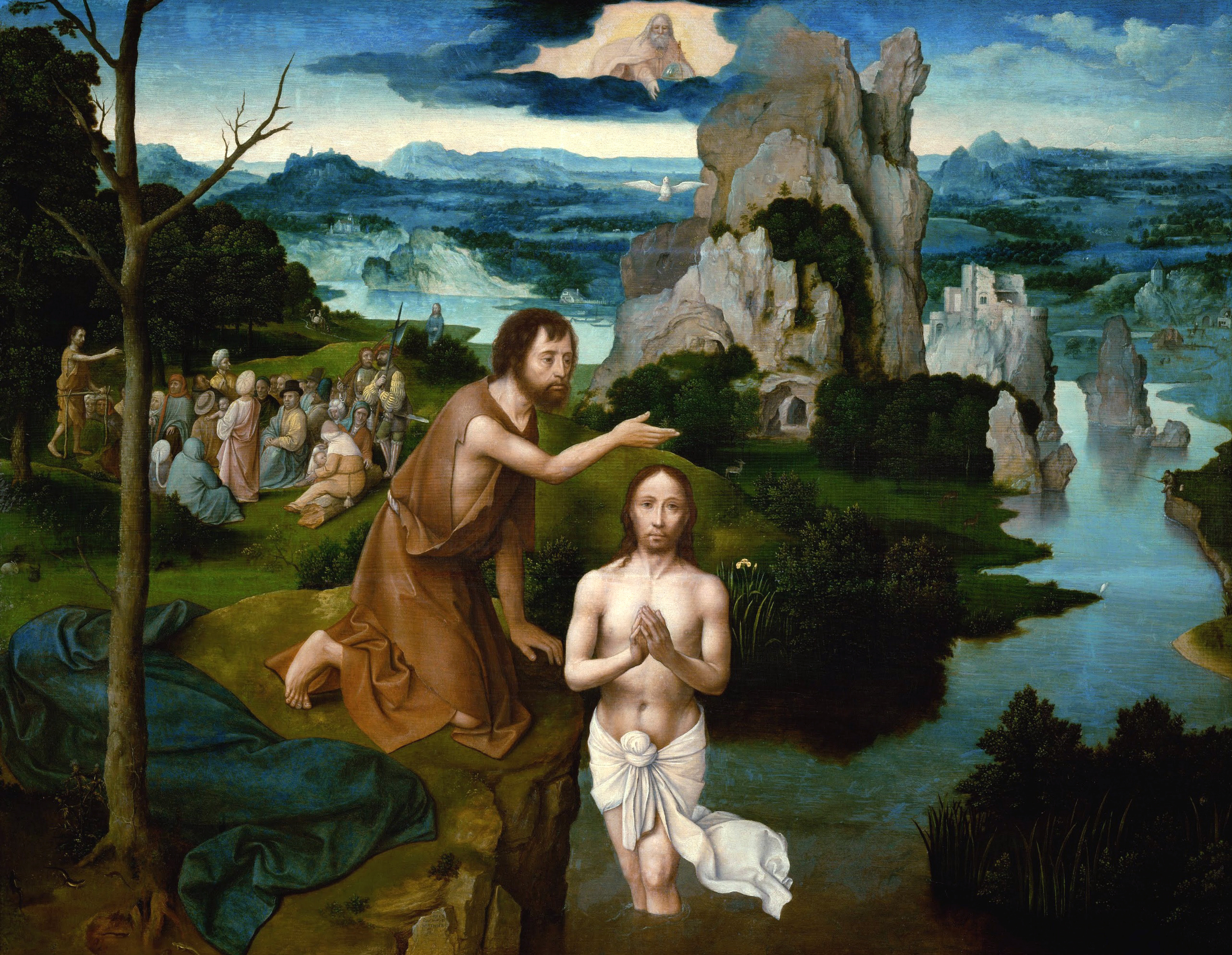
- Artist: Joachim Patinir
- Year: c.1515; 510 years ago
- Medium: oil on oak
- Dimensions: 59.7 cm × 76.3 cm (23.5 in × 30.0 in)
- Location: Kunsthistorisches Museum, Vienna

The Baptism of Christ is an oil on oak wood painting executed c. 1515 by the Flemish Renaissance painter Joachim Patinir, which is now in the collection of the Kunsthistoriches Museum in Vienna.

The work depicts the baptism of Christ in the River Jordan by Saint John the Baptist, as described in Matthew 3:13–17. Matthew relates how John had begun living and preaching in the wilderness, living on locusts and wild honey and wearing a camel hair robe with a leather belt. After preaching he would baptise those who confessed their sins. Jesus attended one of his sessions and asked to be baptised. John refused at first, saying he was unworthy, but was persuaded by Jesus to carry out the baptism. As Jesus afterwards rose up from the water the heavens opened and he saw the Spirit of God in the form of a descending dove. And a voice from heaven said: "This is my son, whom I love; with him I am well pleased.”

== See also ==
- 100 Great Paintings, 1980 BBC series
