= Landscape with the Flight into Egypt (Patinir) =

Painting by Joachim Patinir

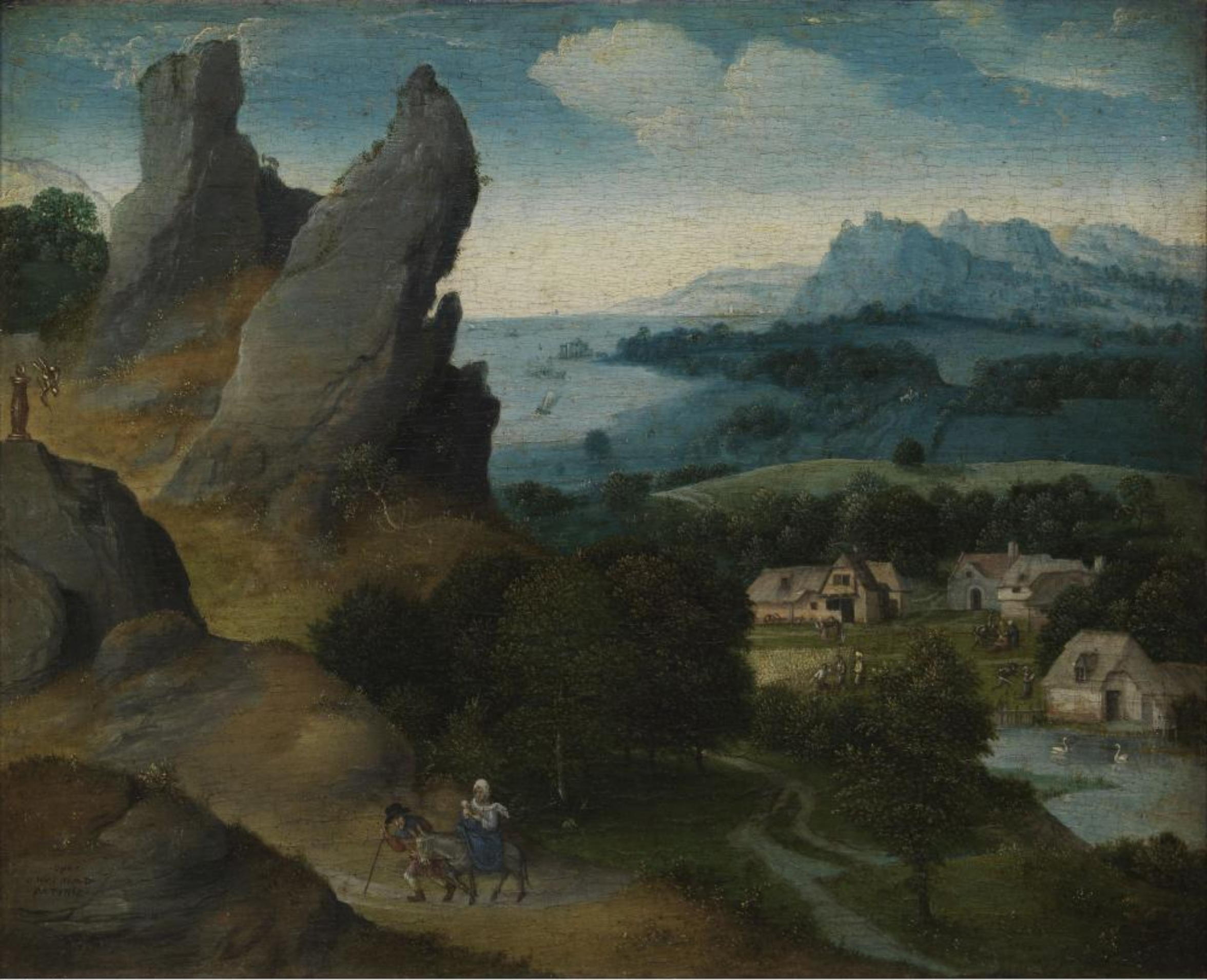
- Artist: Joachim Patinir
- Year: c. 1515
- Medium: oil on panel
- Dimensions: 17 cm × 21 cm (6.7 in × 8.3 in)
- Location: Royal Museum of Fine Arts, Antwerp

Landscape with the Flight into Egypt is a c. 1515 panel painting by Joachim Patinir, now in the Royal Museum of Fine Arts, Antwerp.
