= Bonaventura van Overbeek =

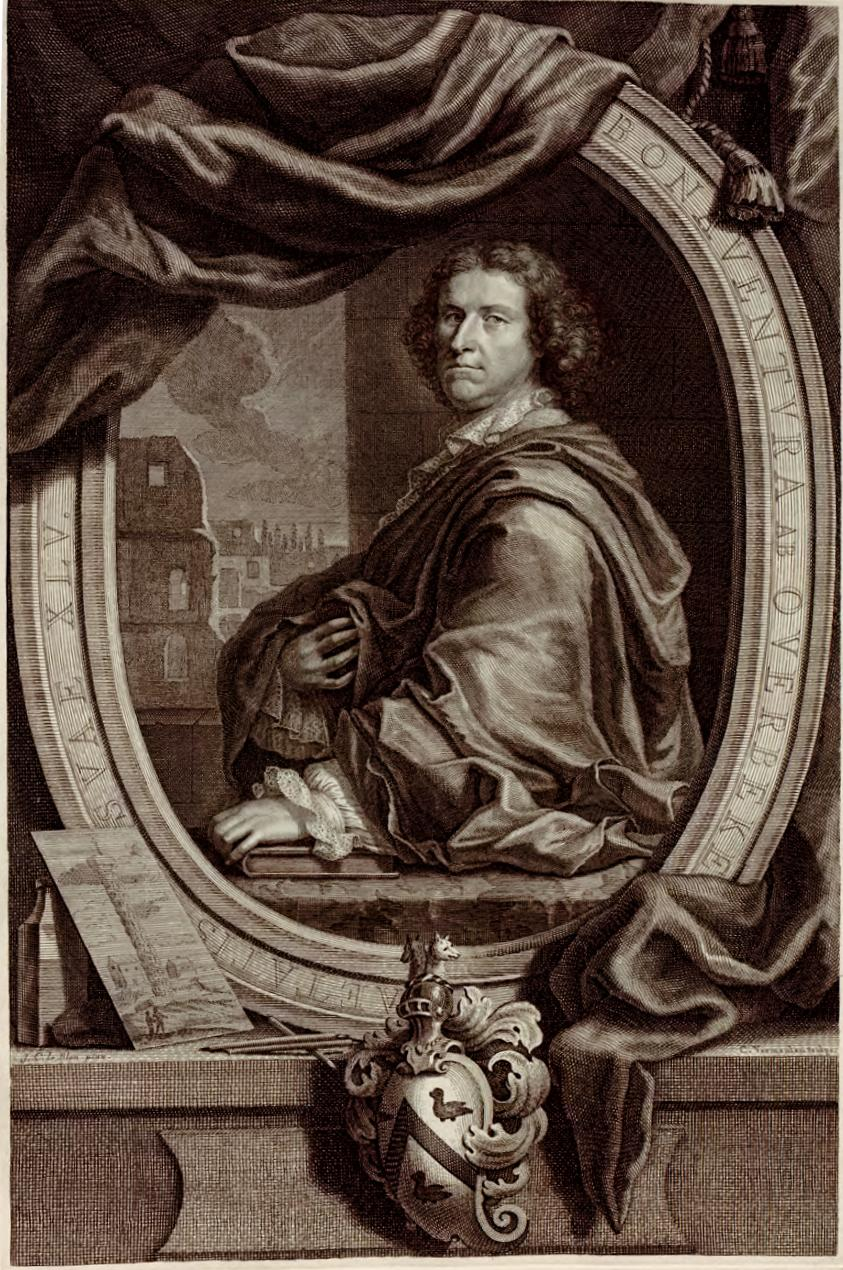
Portrait of Overbeek portrayed with one of his etchings in his Les restes de l'ancienne Rome in 1709, after a painting by Jacob Christoph Le Blon and engraved by Cornelis Vermeulen.

Bonaventura van Overbeek (1660–1705) was a Dutch Golden Age draughtsman and engraver.

== Biography ==
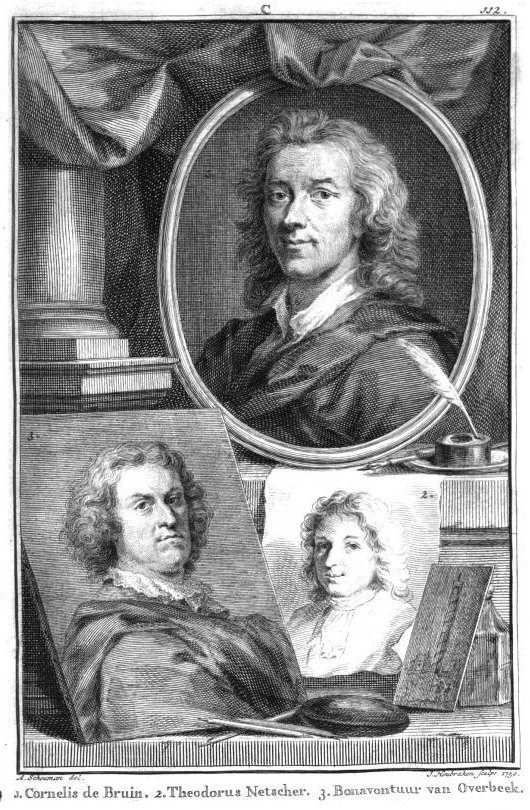
Portrait lower left in Jan van Gool's Nieuw schouburg by Aart Schouman based on Overbeek's Les restes de l'ancienne Rome in 1709.

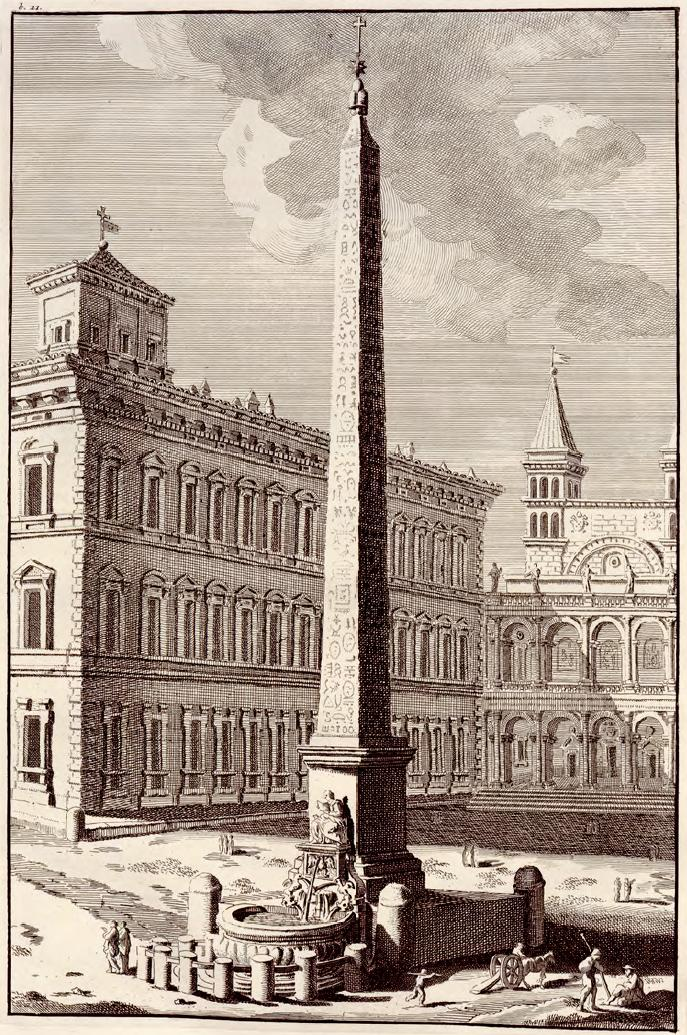
Lateran Obelisk in Volume 2 of his Antique relics of Rome, showing the state of Domenico Fontana's fountain as it then was in 1709

Overbeek was born and baptized in Frankfurt and died in Amsterdam. According to Houbraken, he drew the Roman ruins from life and, while in Rome, he joined the Bentvueghels with the nickname Romulus. He published several etchings of his drawings, but also published a book with descriptions of the major sites of Rome in 1708, that he had dedicated to the English princess Anna – he died before publication and the book was published by his nephew Michiel van Overbeke. Bonaventura was born a year too late for Houbraken's third volume on artists, and perhaps it was Houbraken's notes that Jan van Gool used for his 7-page biographical sketch of him.

According to the RKD his cousin Michiel van Overbeke published his prints after his death (Reliquiae antiquiae urbis Romae, Amsterdam 1708). He is known for italianate landscapes and was a pupil of Gerard de Lairesse. He travelled to Rome and drew the antiquities, and after he returned was welcomed back by De Lairesse, who took him in. He started to collect plaster casts and drawings, with a view to writing a book on art history. In all he travelled to Rome three times, and his great Latin work on Roman ruins published in 1708 was translated from Latin into French as Les restes de l'ancienne Rome in 1709.
