= Joachim Patinir =

Flemish painter (c. 1480 – 1524)

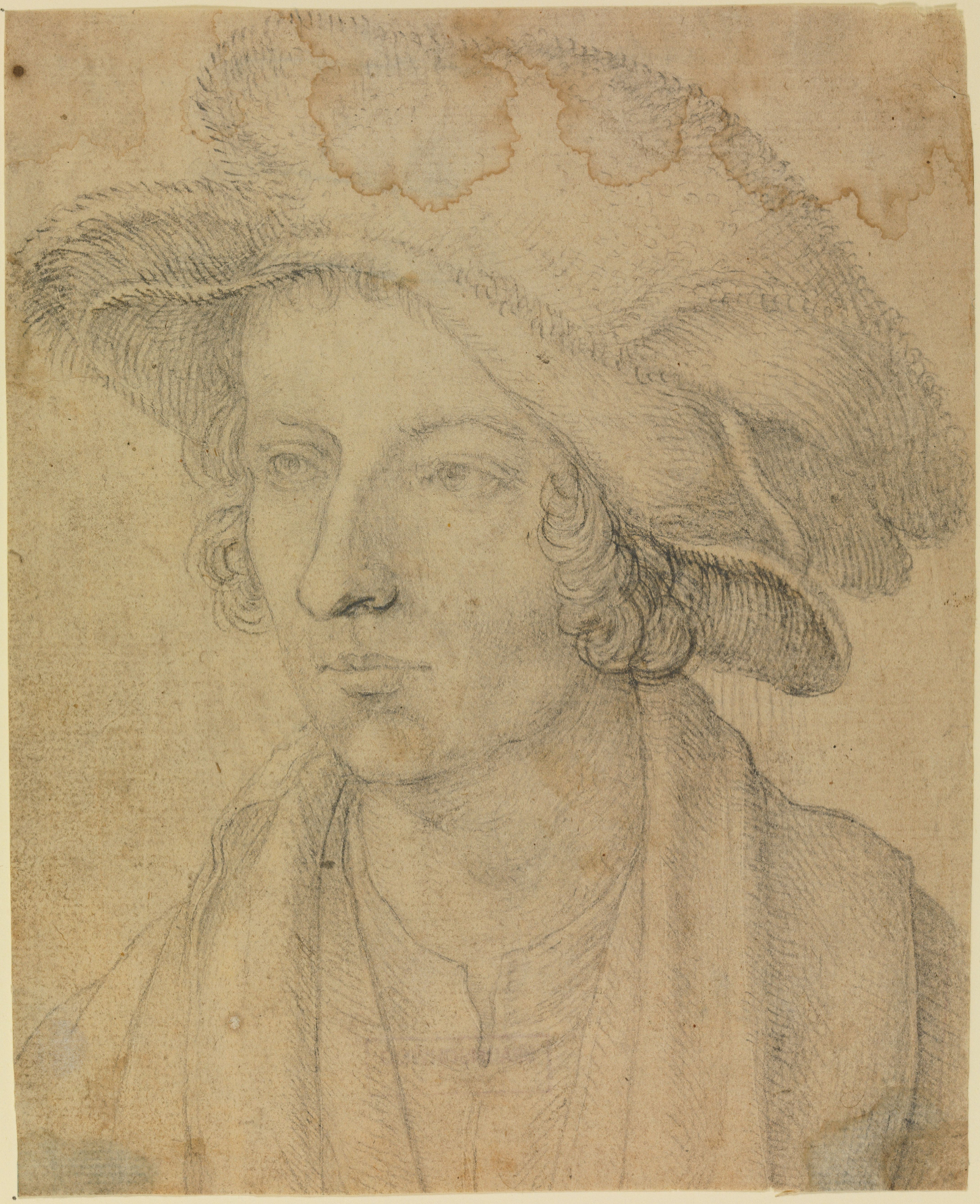
Portrait of Joachim Patinir by Aegidius Sadeler after Dürer

Joachim Patinir, also called Patenier (c. 1480 – 5 October 1524), was a Flemish Renaissance painter of history and landscape subjects. He was born in Wallonia, but in his mature career worked in Antwerp, then the centre of the art market in the Low Countries. Patinir was a pioneer of landscape as an independent genre and he was the first Netherlandish painter to regard himself primarily as a landscape painter. He effectively invented the world landscape, a distinct style of panoramic northern Renaissance landscapes which is Patinir's important contribution to Western art. His work marks an important stage in the development of the representation of perspective in landscape painting.

Patinir was a friend of not only Dürer, but also of the leading Antwerp painter Quentin Metsys, with whom he often collaborated. The Temptation of St Anthony (Prado) was executed in collaboration with Metsys, who added the figures to Patinir's landscape. His career was nearly contemporary with that of Albrecht Altdorfer, the other major pioneer of paintings dominated by the landscape, who worked in a very different style. He may have been the uncle of Herri met de Bles, but there is not a single piece of contemporary evidence to support it. De Bles was probably only 14(?) when Patinir died, and his style was quite different, although both came from Dinant. The latter is the only fact connecting the two artists at the moment.

== Life and work ==
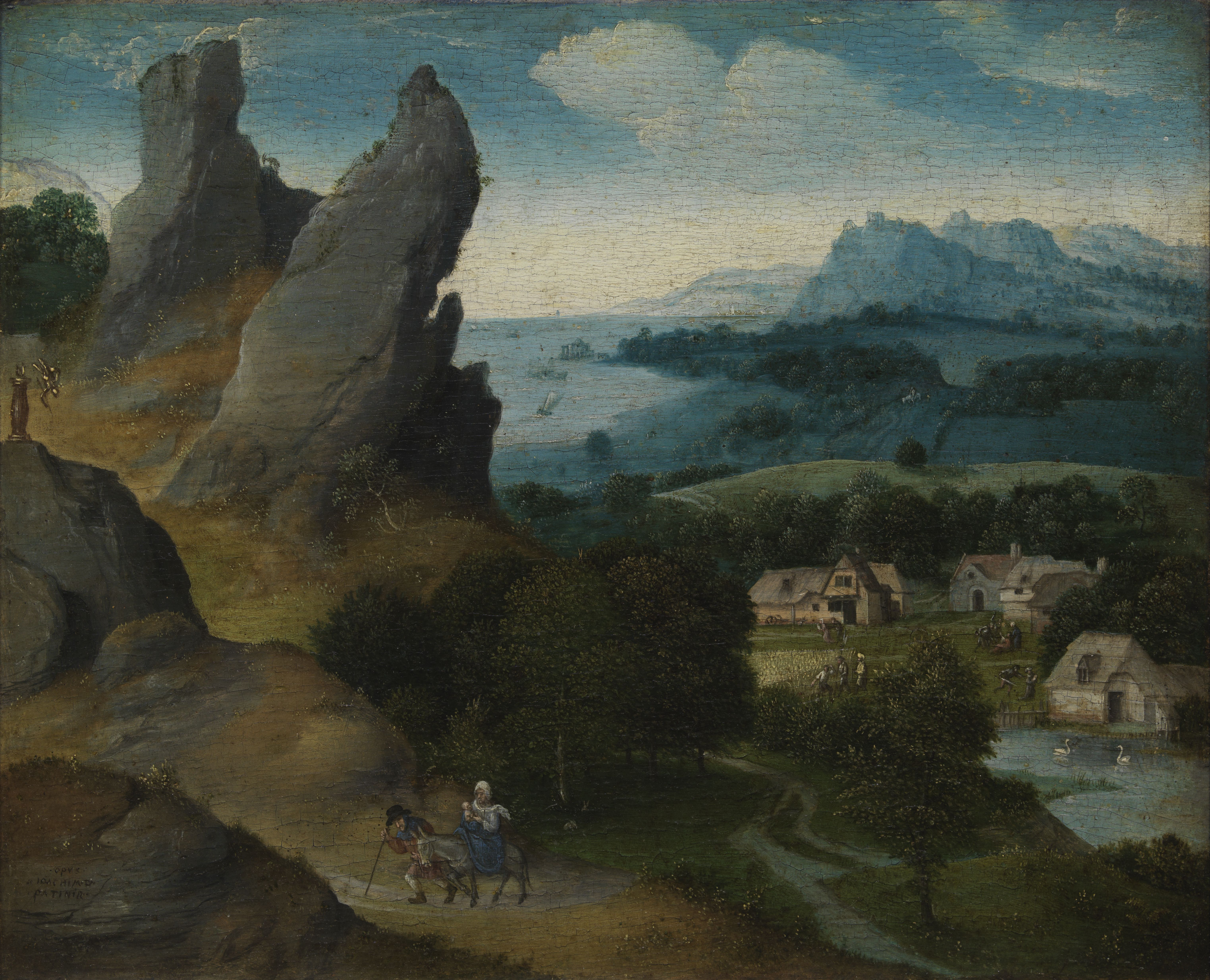
Landscape with the Flight into Egypt, oil on panel, 17 × 21 cm, Royal Museum of Fine Arts, Antwerp

Originally from Dinant or Bouvignes in present-day Wallonia, Belgium, Patinir was registered as a member of Antwerp's Guild of Saint Luke in 1515. He lived and worked in Antwerp for the rest of his life. He may have initially studied in Bruges with Gerard David, who registered as a member of the Antwerp Guild in the same year as Patinir. In 1511, Patinir is believed to have travelled to Genoa with David and Adrien Ysenbrandt.

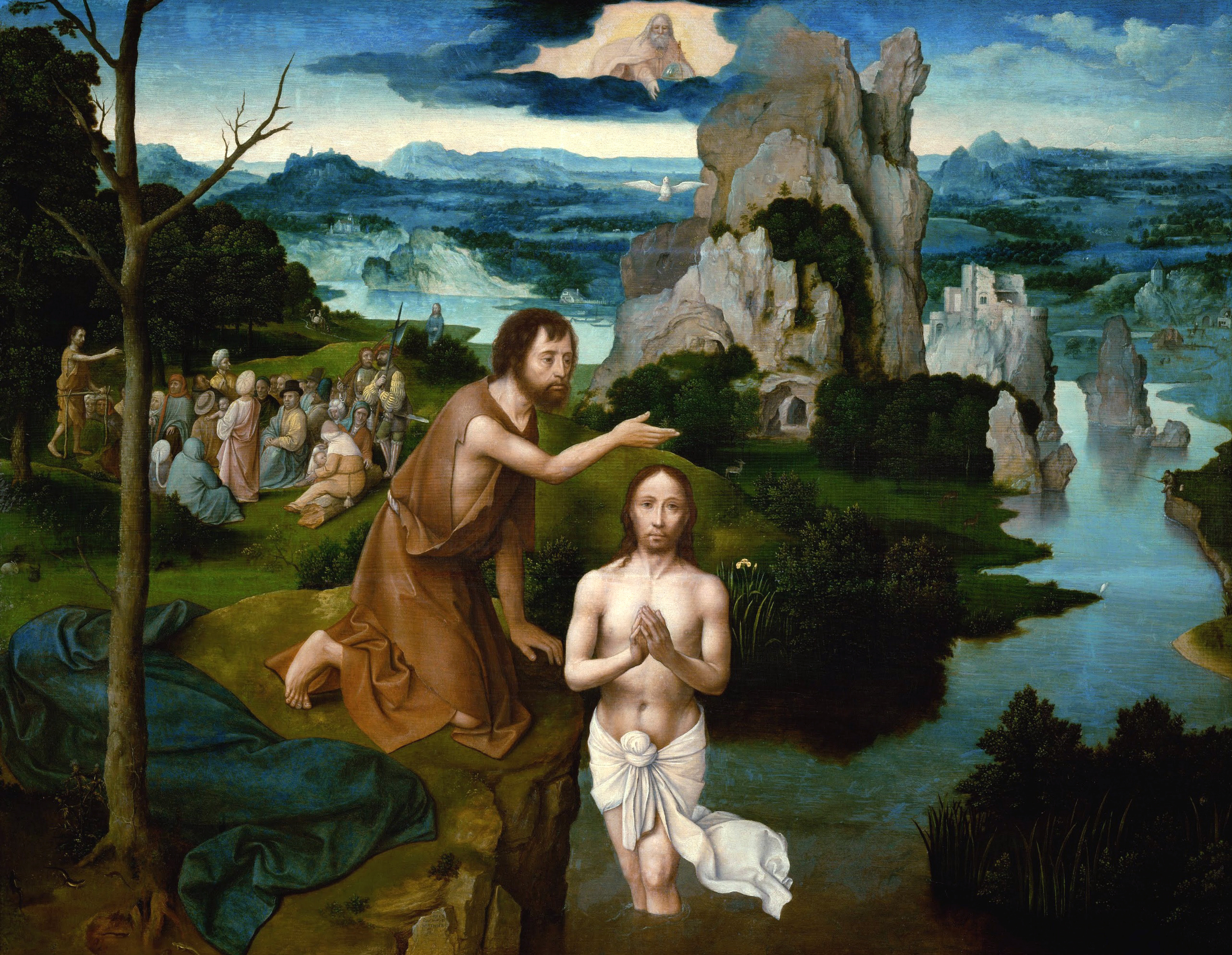
The Baptism of Christ, oil on oak, 59.5 × 77 cm, Kunsthistorisches Museum, Vienna

Patinir married first to Francisca Buyst, a daughter of the painter Edward Buyst of Dendermonde. After the death of his first wife he married Johanna Noyts, on 5 May 1521. Patinir's friend Albrecht Dürer attended his second wedding and painted his portrait. Dürer called Patinir "der gute Landschaftsmaler" ("the good landscape painter"), thus creating a new word for this type of painter. He had three daughters, two from the first marriage and one from the second. He operated a large workshop with assistants in Antwerp but he is not known to have registered any pupils with the Antwerp guild.

Patinir died in Antwerp in 1524. Quentin Metsys became the guardian of his daughters.

== Work ==
There are only five paintings signed by Patinir, but many other works have been attributed to him or his workshop with varying degrees of probability. The ones that are signed read: (Opus) Joachim D. Patinier, the "D" in his signature signifying Dionantensis ("of Dinant"), reflecting his place of origin. A 2007 exhibition at the Museo del Prado in Madrid displayed 21 pictures listed as by Patinir or his workshop, and catalogued a further eight which were not in the exhibition.

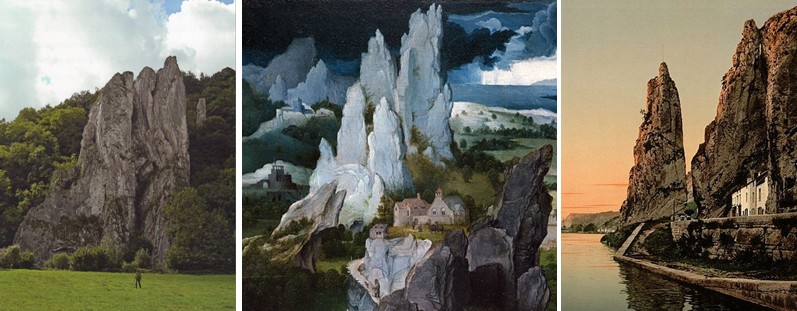
Geological inspiration: detail from Patinir's St Jerome (National Gallery), juxtaposed with photographs of the dramatic rock pinnacles of Dinant

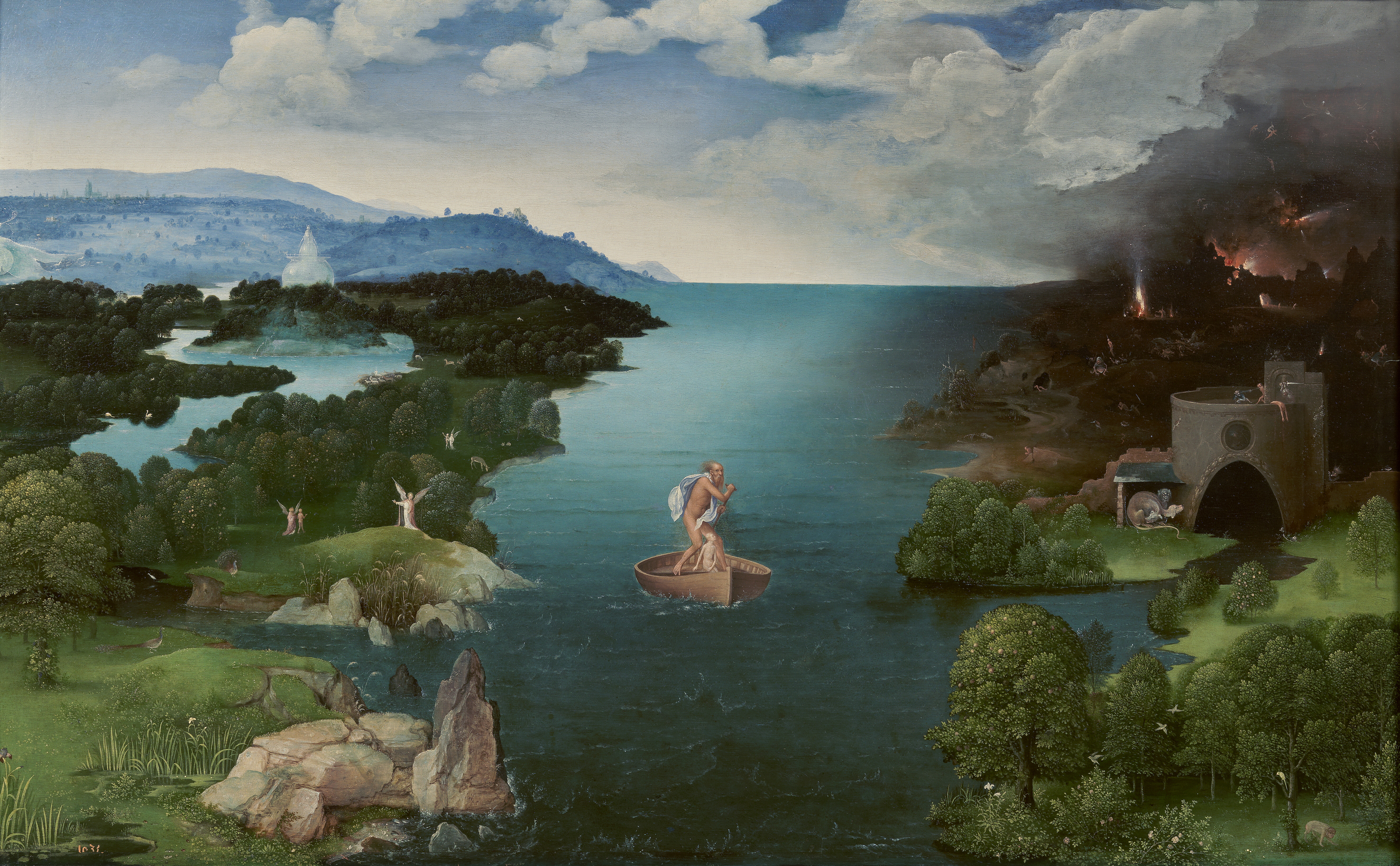
Innovative World landscape: Landscape with Charon Crossing the Styx, oil on panel, 64 × 103cm Prado, Madrid

Patinir often let his landscapes dwarf his figures, which are of very variable quality. The larger ones were sometimes painted by other artists. Such specialisation had become common in the Low Countries at the time. Many of his works are unusually large for Netherlandish panel paintings of the time.

Patinir's large vistas combine observation of naturalistic detail with lyrical fantasy. The steep outcrops of rocks in his landscapes are more spectacular versions of the group of very individual formations just around his native Dinant. These became a part of the world landscape formula, and are found in the works of many painters who never saw the originals. His landscapes use a high viewpoint with a high horizon, but his grasp of aerial perspective is far from complete. He uses a consistent and effective colour scheme in his landscapes, which was influential on later landscape painting. The foreground is dominated by brownish shades, while "the middle ground [is] a bluish green and the background a pale blue", creating an effective sense of recession into the distance; "When combined with the frequently hard-toned browns, greens and blues that alternate with significant areas of white, a sense of impending doom is created by the threatening clouds, the capricious and sharply pointed contours of the rocks and the crowding together of natural elements."

== Selected works ==
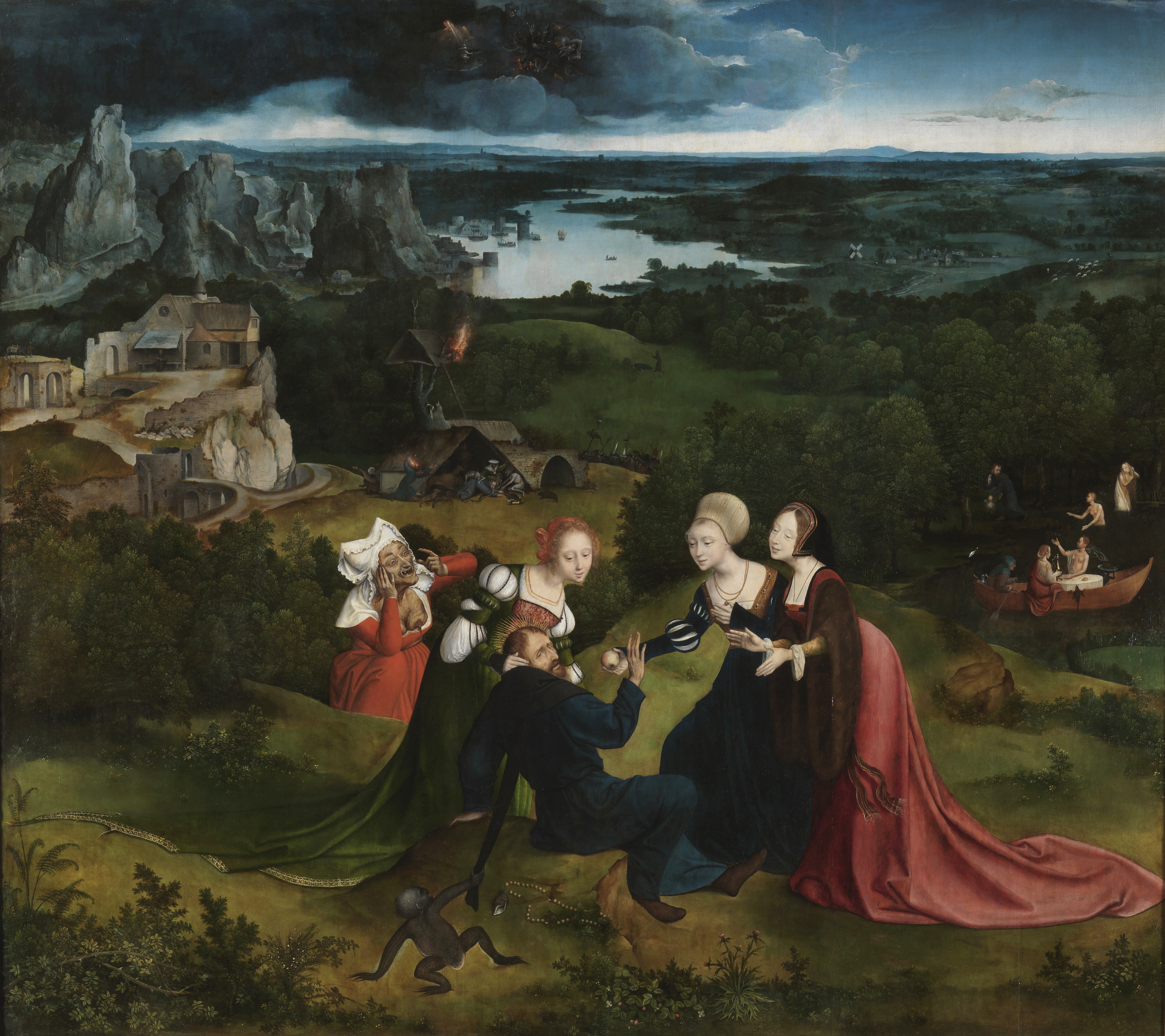
The Temptation of Saint Anthony, collaboration with Matsys, c. 1515, oil on panel, 173× 155 cm, Prado, Madrid

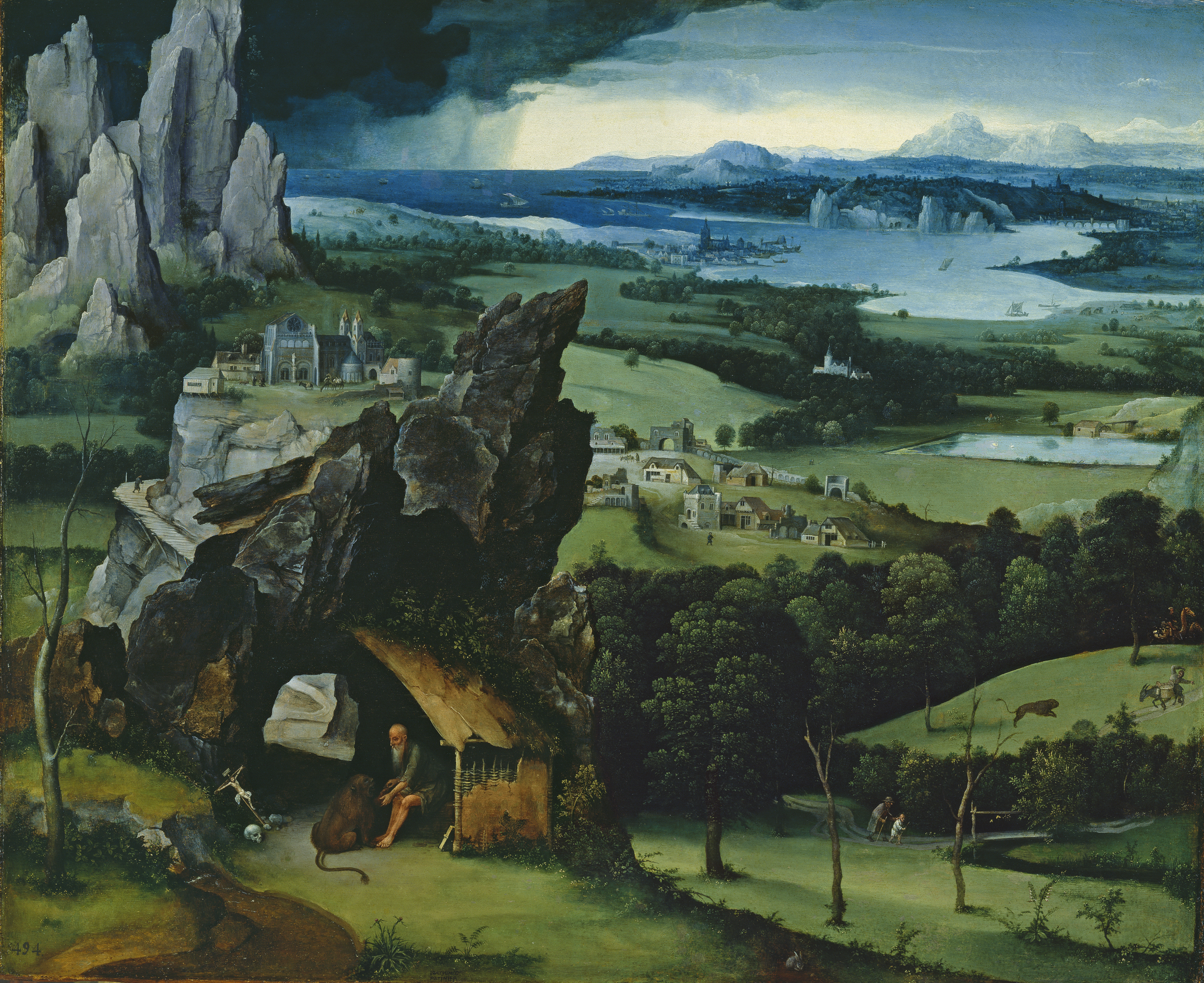
Landscape with St Jerome, 1515–1519, oil on panel, 74 cm × 91 cm (29 in × 36 in), Prado, Madrid

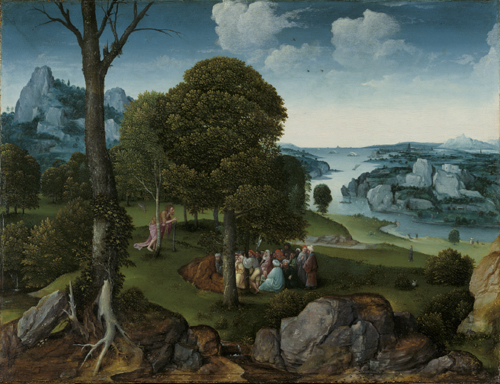
Landscape with St John the Baptist Preaching, oil on oak, 36.5 cm × 45 cm (14.4 in × 17.7 in), Royal Museums of Fine Arts of Belgium

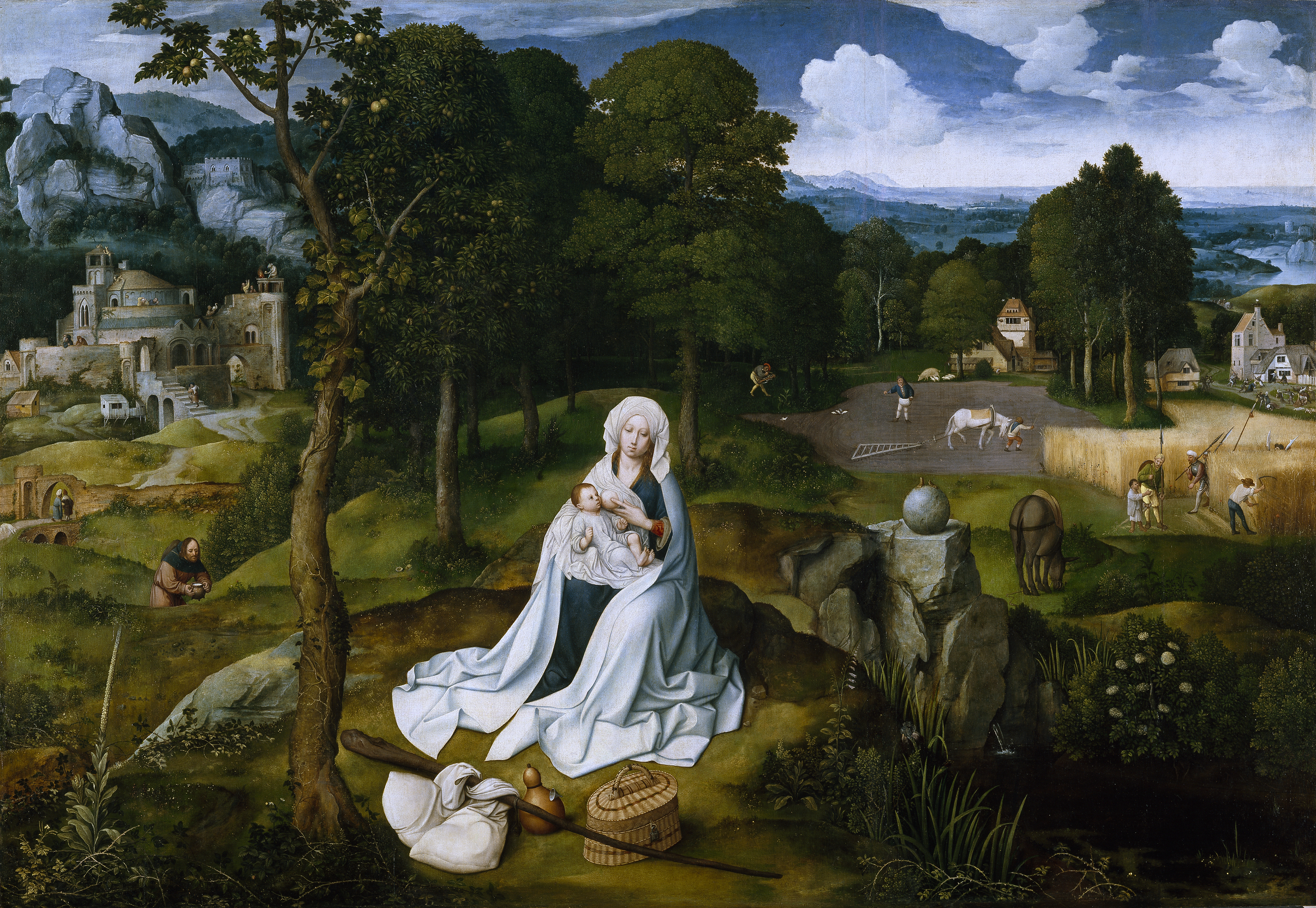
Rest on the Flight into Egypt, oil on panel, 121 cm × 177 cm (48 in × 70 in), Museo del Prado, Madrid

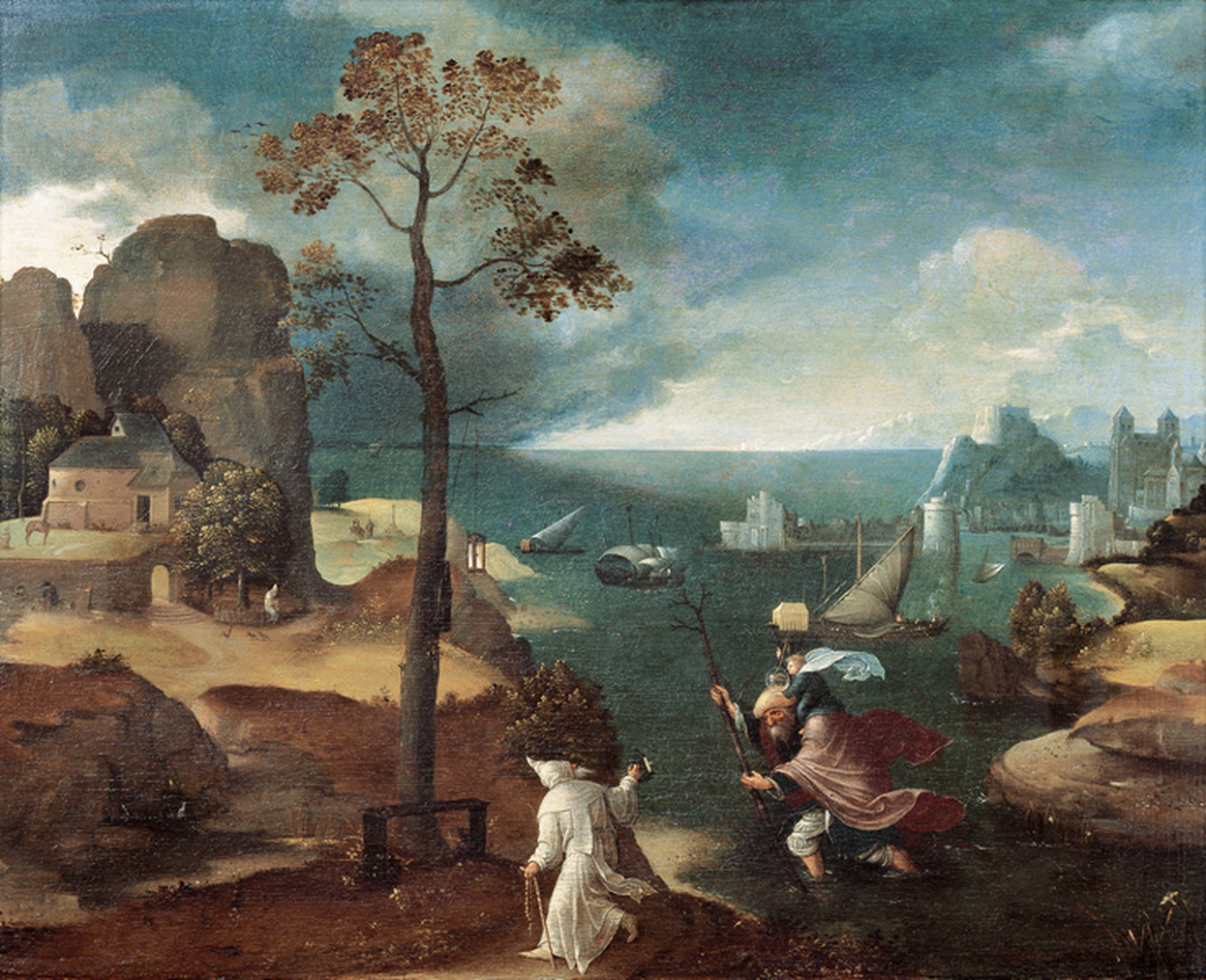
St Christopher Bearing the Christ Child, oil on panel, 48 cm × 59.5 cm (18.9 in × 23.4 in), Rockoxhuis, Antwerp

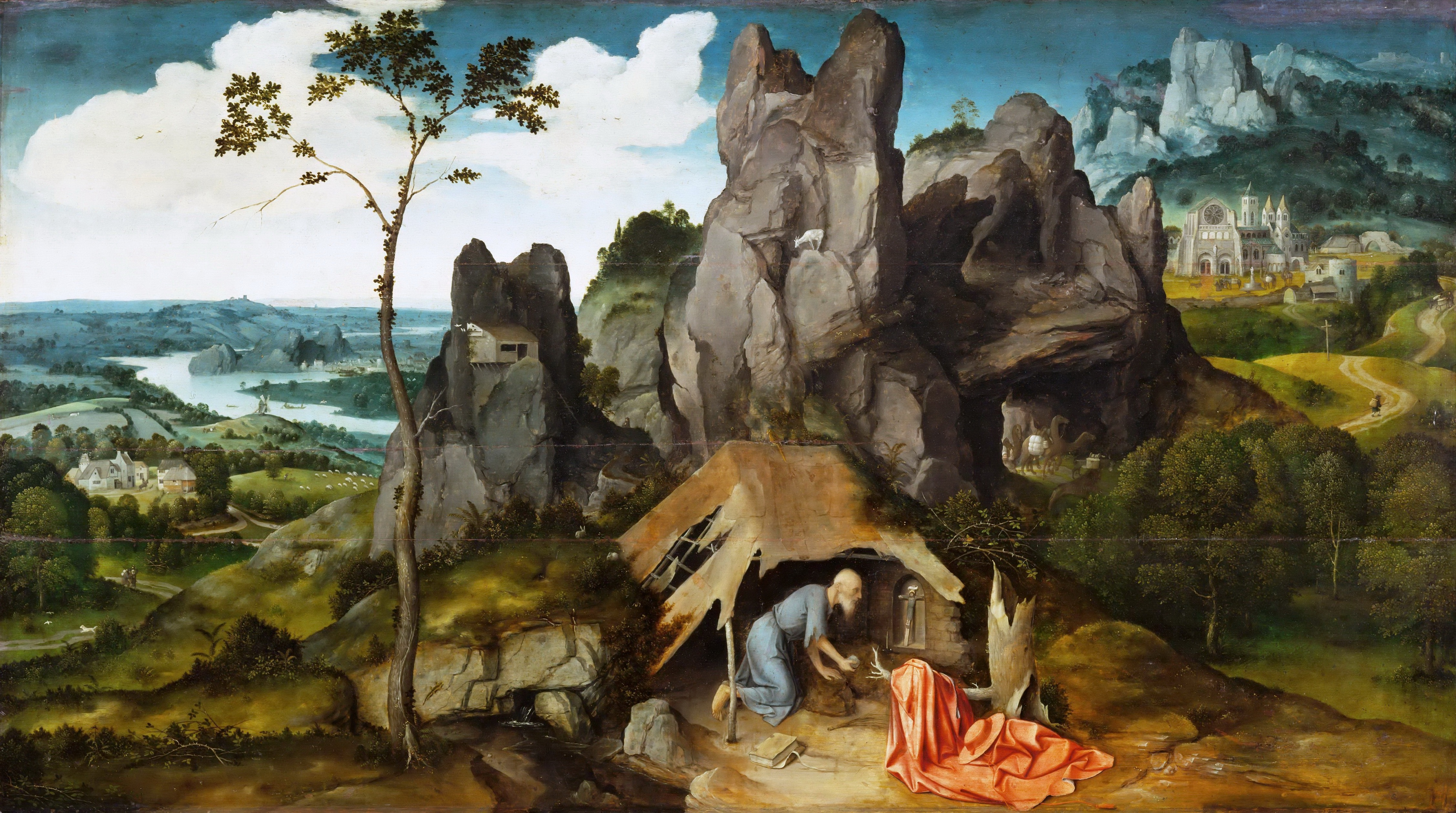
St Jerome in the Desert, c. 1520, oil on panel, 78 cm × 137 cm (31 in × 54 in), Louvre, Paris

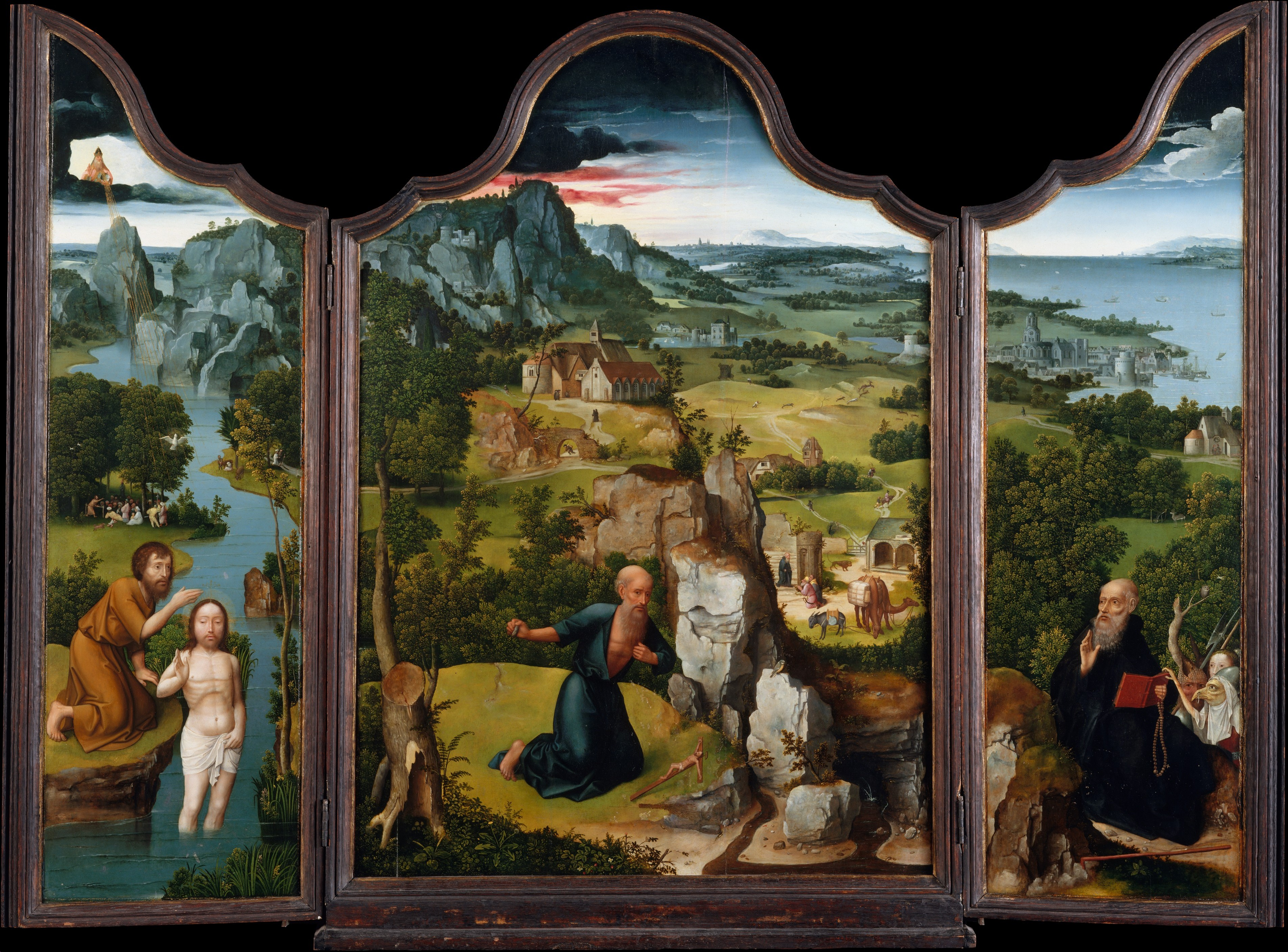
The Penitence of Saint Jerome, c. 1512–15, triptych, oil on wood, 117.5 cm × 81.3 cm (46.3 in × 32.0 in), each wing 120.7 cm × 35.6 cm (47.5 in × 14.0 in), Metropolitan Museum of Art, New York

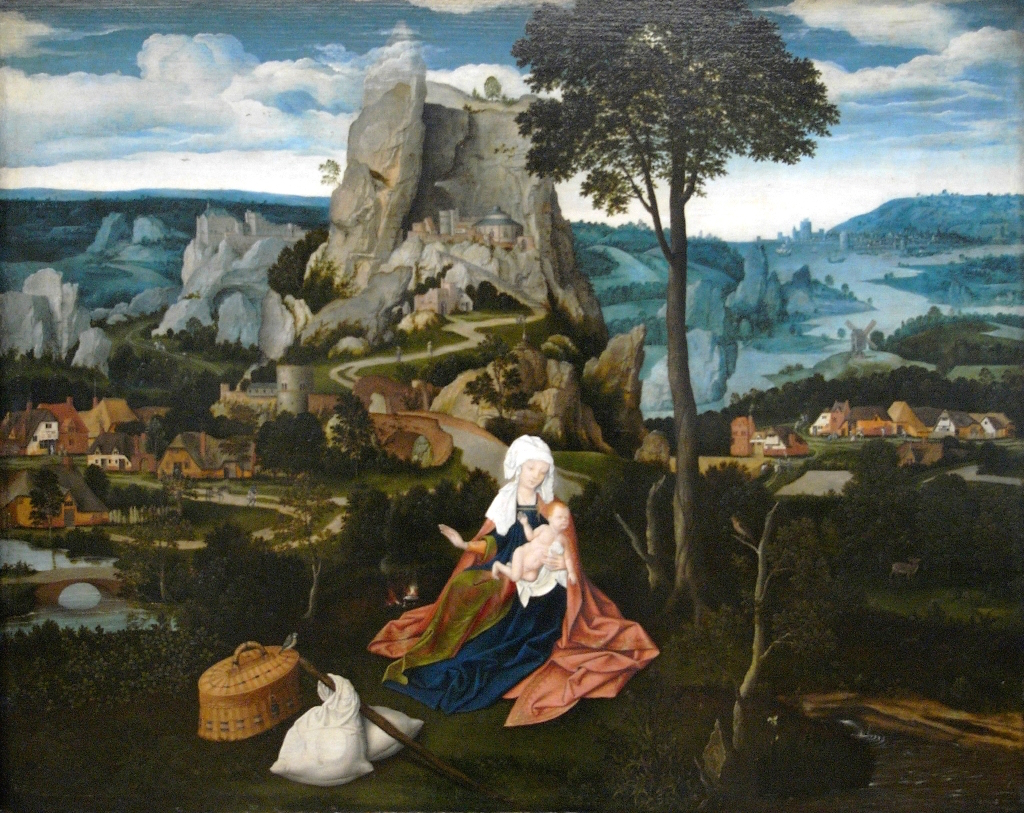
Rest on the Flight into Egypt, 1515–1524, on wood, 62 × 78 cm, Gemäldegalerie, Berlin

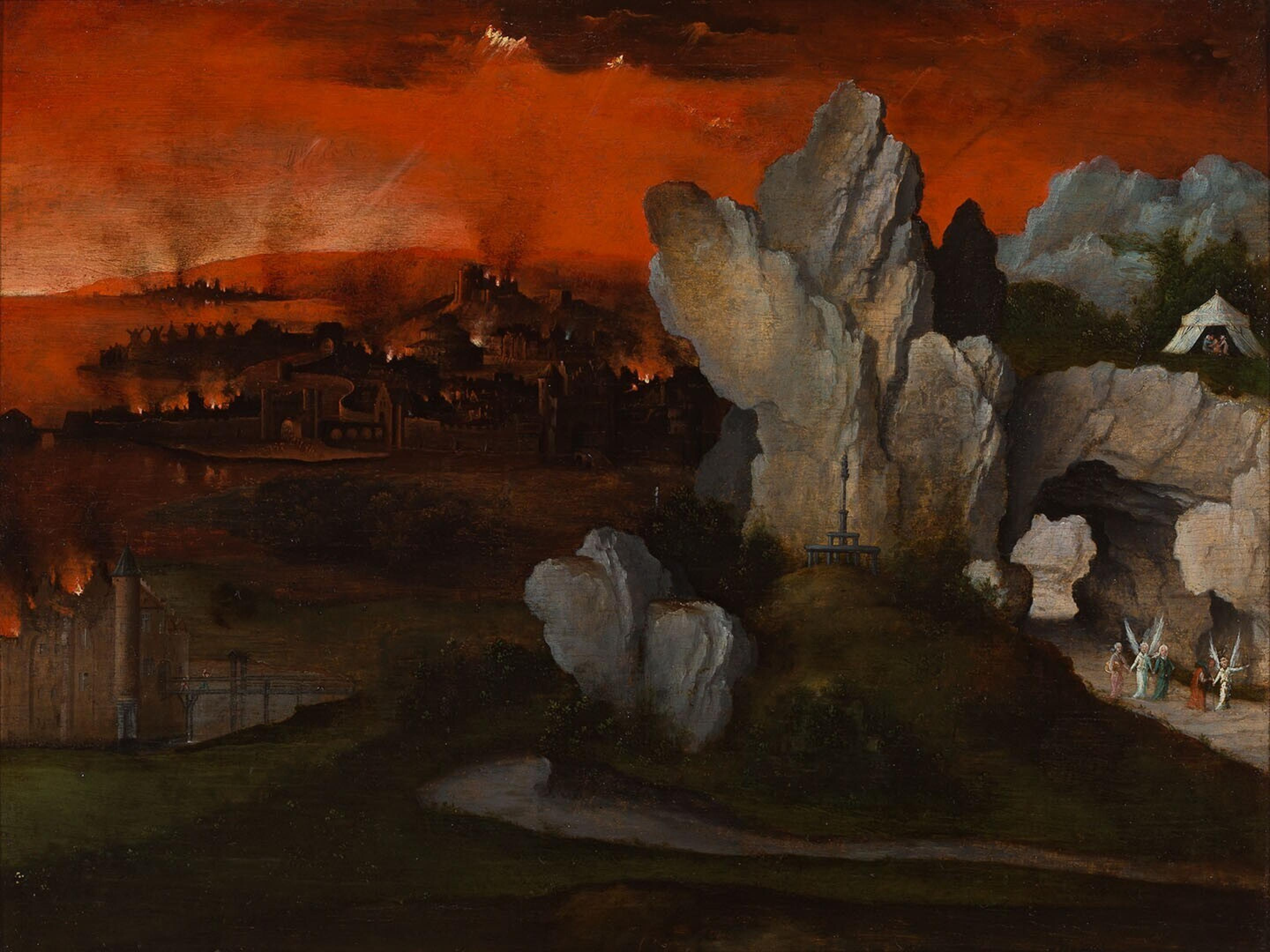
Landscape with the Destruction of Sodom and Gomorrah, c. 1520, oil on panel, 22.5 cm × 308 cm (8.9 in × 121.3 in), Museum Boijmans Van Beuningen, Rotterdam

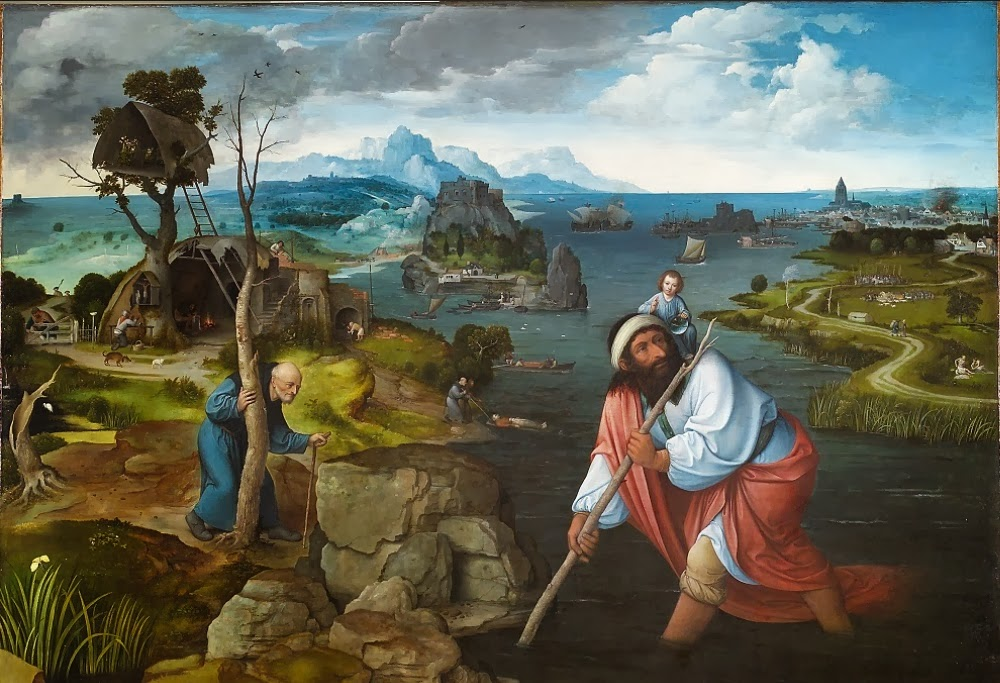
Landscape with Saint Christopher, c. 1520, oil on panel, 125 cm × 170 cm (49 in × 67 in), El Escorial, Monasterio de San Lorenzo, Spain

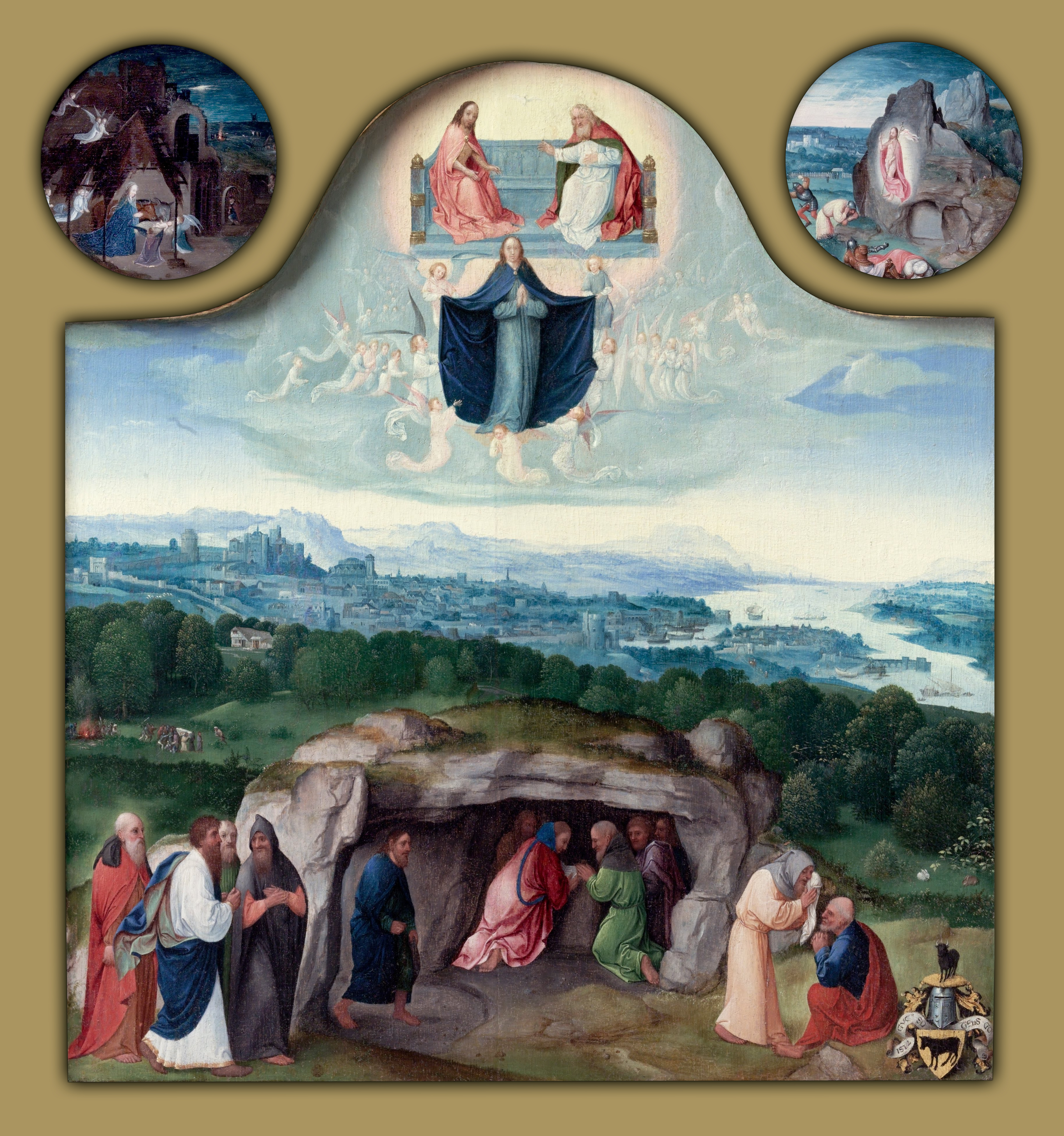
The Assumption of the Virgin, with the Nativity, the Resurrection, the Adoration of the Magi, the Ascension of Christ, Saint Mark and an Angel, and Saint Luke and an Ox, c. 1510–20, oil on panel, 62.28 cm × 58.7 cm (24.52 in × 23.11 in), Philadelphia Museum of Art

== See also ==
- Early Renaissance painting
- Renaissance in the Low Countries

== Sources ==
- Koch, Robert A. Joachim Patinir (Princeton: Princeton University Press, 1968).
- Battistini, Matilde. Symbols & Allegories in Art: The Hereafter. Los Angeles: The J. Paul Getty Museum, 2005. 210, 212–13.
- Falkenburg, Reindert. Joachim Patinir: Landscape as an Image of the Pilgrimage of Life. Amsterdam/Philadelphia: John Benjamins Publishing Company, 1988.
- Ball-Krückmann, Babette, Landschaft zur Andacht: die Weltlandschaften Joachim Pateniers. Munich 1977 (microfiche)
- Smith Chipps, Jeffery. The Northern Renaissance. Phaidon. Arts & Ideas, 2004. 321.
