= Rest on the Flight into Egypt =

Subject in Christian art

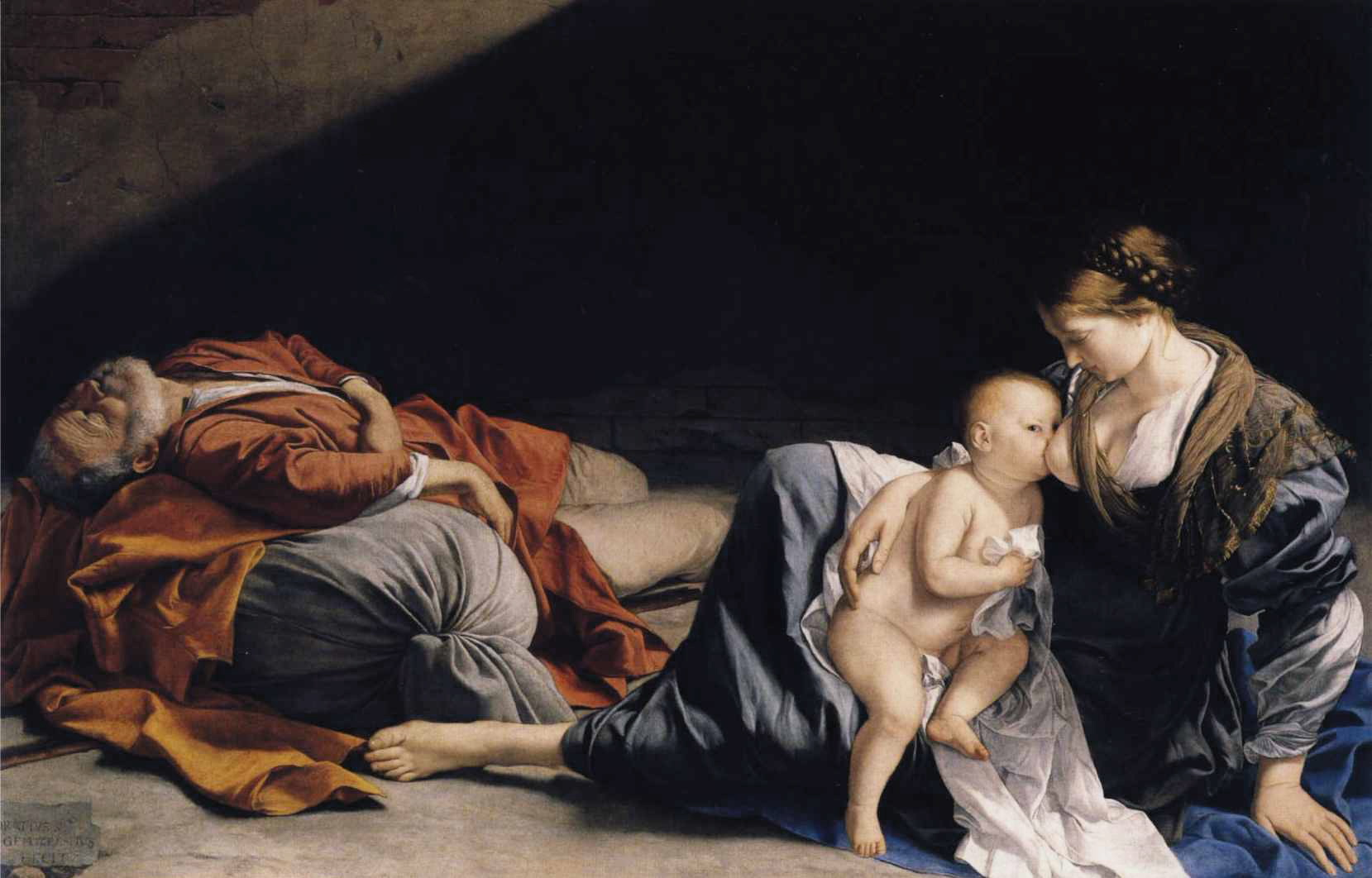
Orazio Gentileschi, 1625–1626

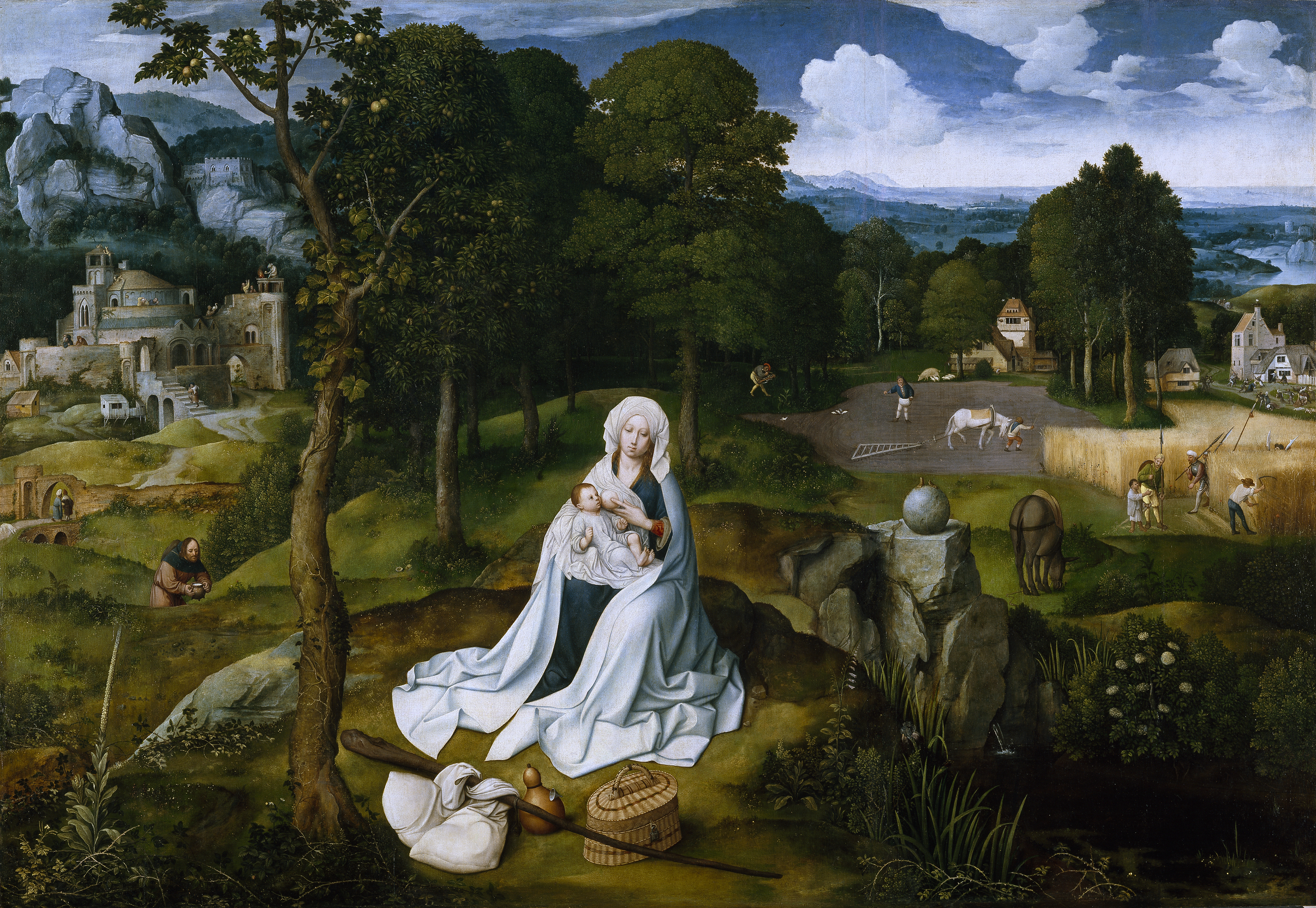
Joachim Patinir, 1518–1520, Prado

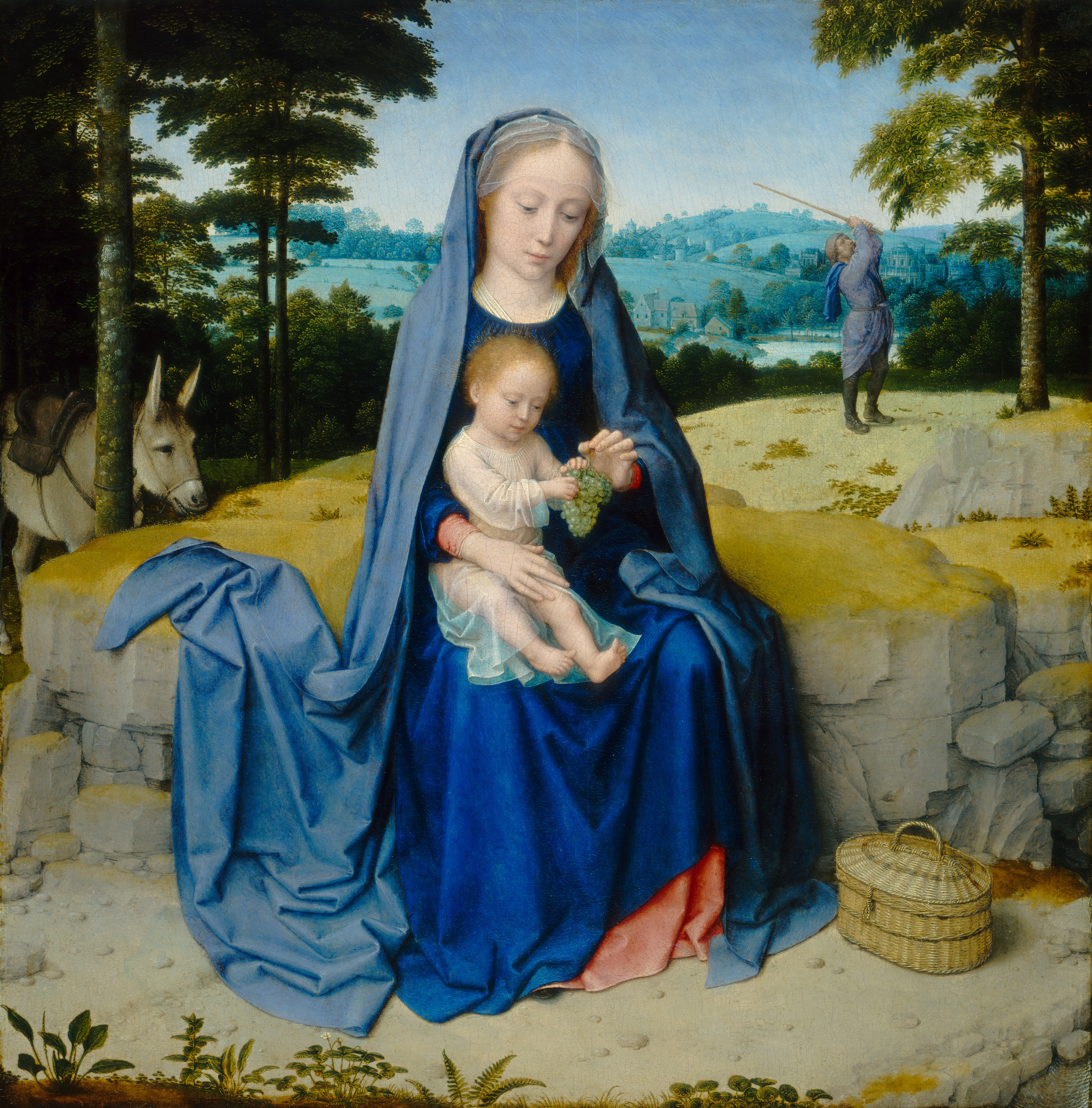
Gerard David, c. 1510, National Gallery of Art. Joseph is beating chestnuts from a tree.

The Rest on the Flight into Egypt is a subject in Christian art showing Mary, Joseph, and the infant Jesus resting during their flight into Egypt. The Holy Family is normally shown in a landscape.

The subject did not develop until the second half of the fourteenth century, though it was an "obvious step" from depictions of the "legend of the palm tree" where they pause to eat dates and rest; palm trees are often included. It was a further elaboration of the long-standing traditions of incidents that embellished the story of the Flight into Egypt, which the New Testament merely says happened, without giving any details.

The earliest known depiction of the Rest is a panel in the large compartmented Grabow Altarpiece by the north German painter Meister Bertram, from about 1379, and the subject was mainly found north of the Alps until 1500 or later. Most depictions were made for wealthy homes rather than churches, and the subject only rarely forms part of cycles of the Life of Christ in churches (though the Grabow Altarpiece is one exception). As landscape painting increased in popularity, it became an alternative to the original scene of the family on the road, and by the late sixteenth century perhaps overtook it in popularity.

The figures are often simply resting, but sometimes more definite camping or picnicking is shown, perhaps assisted by angels. In earlier pieces the Virgin is sometimes breastfeeding, connecting to the long-standing iconography of the Virgo Lactans. Joseph may be active, gathering firewood or fetching water, but in later pieces he is sometimes fast asleep, which the Virgin rarely is. In larger landscapes, other legendary incidents from the Flight may be seen in the distance.

== Background ==
The single New Testament account, in Matthew 2:14, merely says (of Joseph): "When he arose, he took the young child and his mother by night, and departed into Egypt". This account was embellished in various early New Testament apocrypha, which added various legendary incidents. Late medieval accounts continued to add detail, in particular the Vita Christi of Ludolph of Saxony, completed about 1374, just a few years before the time that the first artistic depiction of the Rest is found. This includes a description of Mary breastfeeding, which is found in Meister Bertram's Grabow Altarpiece, the first known painting. Ludolph also mentions the journey passing "through dark and uninhabited forests, and by very long routes past rough and deserted places to Egypt", setting the tone for the great majority of the landscape settings throughout the history of the depiction, though the trees usually clear sufficiently to allow a distant view.

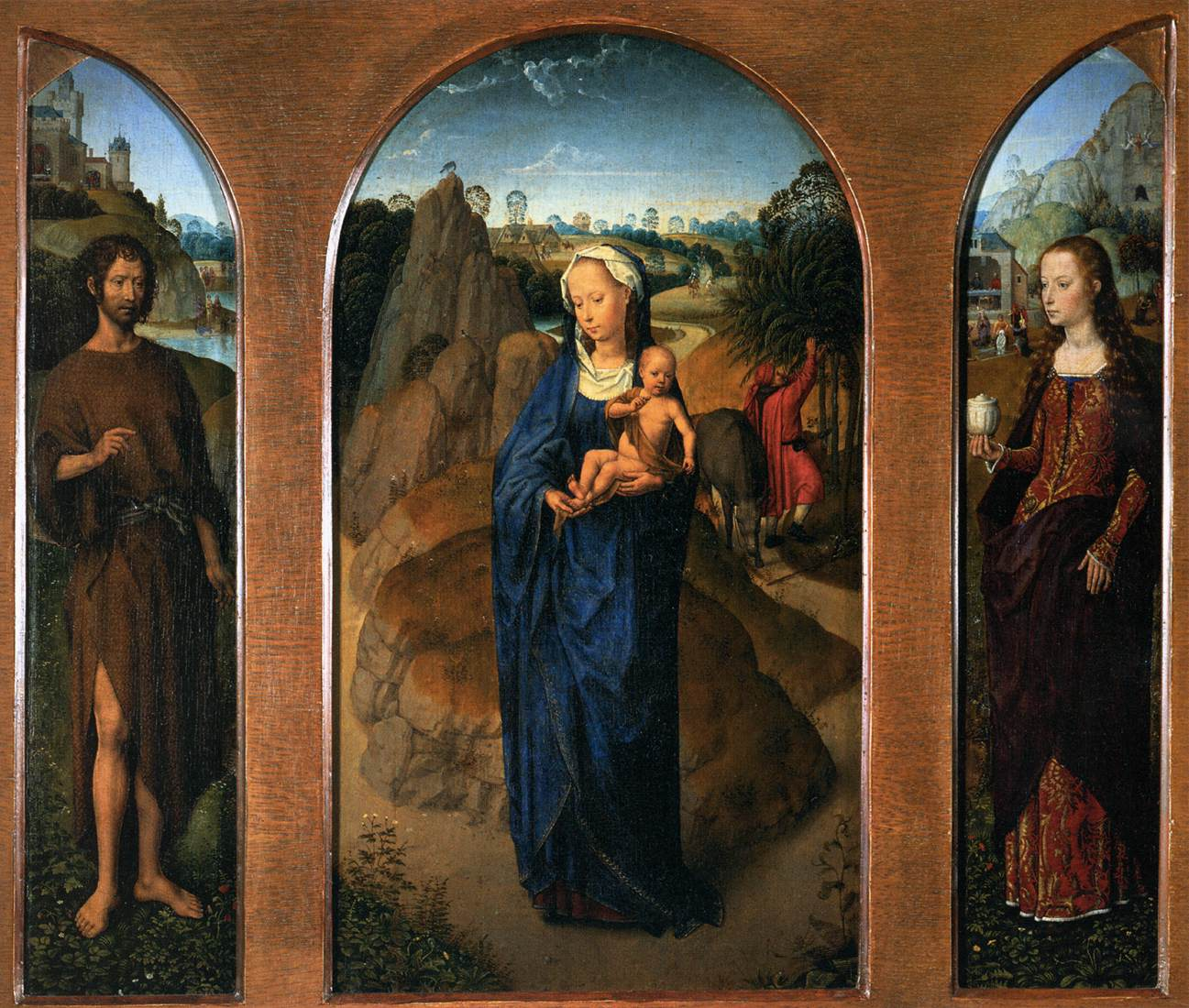
Hans Memling triptych, 1475–1480, Louvre

While the miraculous legends like the miracles of the palm tree, corn, and pagan statue all fell under the disapproval of the Church in the Counter-Reformation, and generally disappear from art, that the Holy Family must have broken their journey for rests was undeniable, so that the subject's legitimacy in scriptural terms was defensible. The subject also suited Counter-Reformation drives to promote down to earth realism into New Testament subjects, and to increase the role of Saint Joseph. It thus increased in popularity as the other accretions to the story reduced. One of the legends, going back to the Gospel of Pseudo-Matthew (perhaps 7th-century), was that at the same time as the "miracle of the palm-tree" on the third day of the journey, a spring miraculously appeared when the travellers needed water, and the Rest is often set beside a spring or stream, though this can be regarded as natural.

Christ taking leave of his Mother is another subject with similar origins in late medieval meditational literature. It seems to have been taken up by Passion plays, and does not appear in art before the late 15th century, peaking in the approximate period 1500–1520, mostly in Germany.

== Development of compositions ==
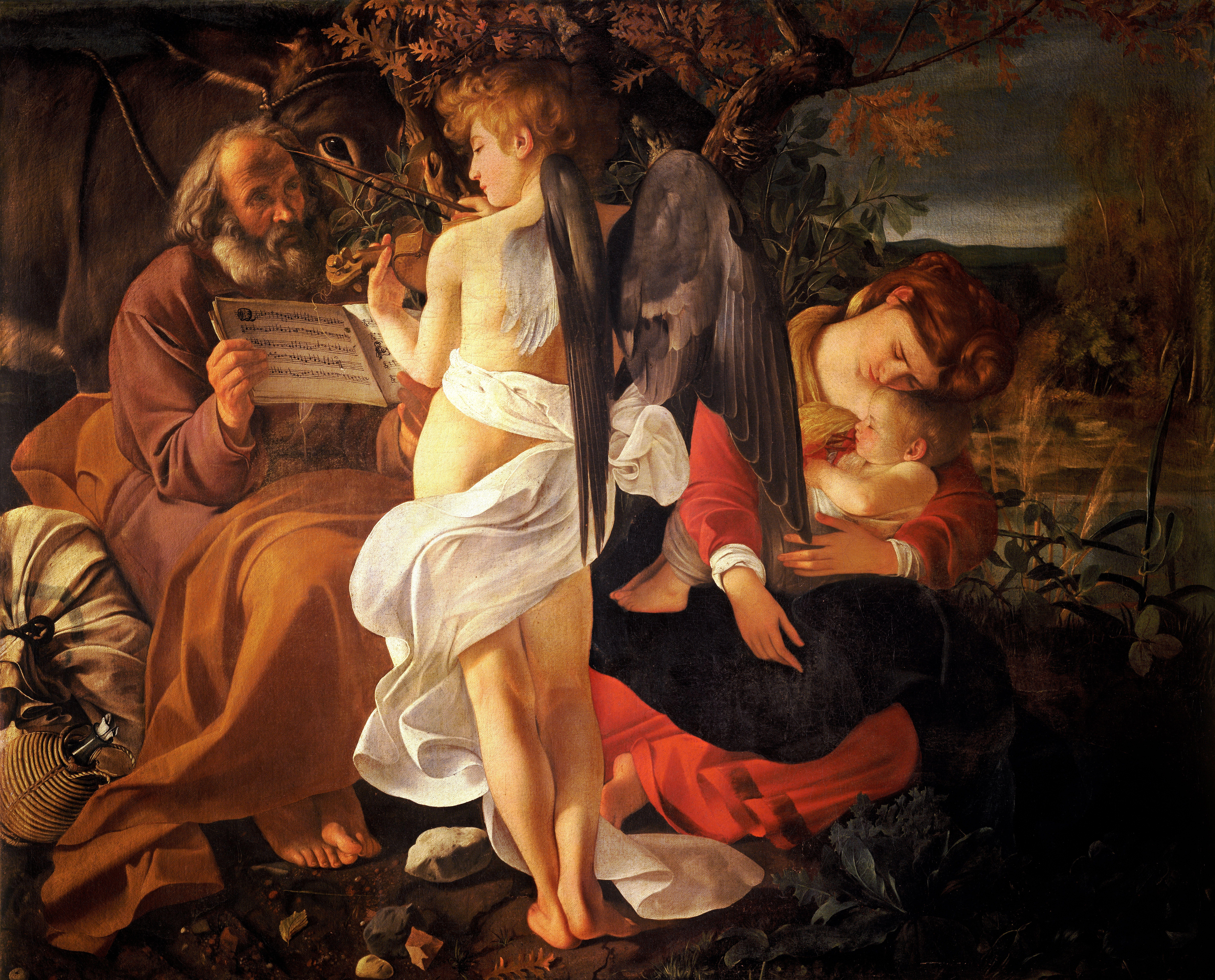
Rest on the Flight by Caravaggio, c. 1597, Doria Pamphilj Gallery, Rome

The panel in the Grabow Altarpiece emphasises eating and drinking: Jesus is breastfeeding, the donkey drinking from a stream, and Joseph eating (probably bread) while offering Mary a bottle. Although the painting has a gold ground, this is one of the panels where landscape settings are painted around the edges. For about a century after this, depictions remain few. An altarpiece by Hans Memling (Louvre) marks the beginning of a sharp increase in depictions of the scene, and introduces the miracles to the background landscape, though the composition, with a standing Virgin, is unusual.

In the decades around 1500 the Virgin and Child often dominate the composition in Early Netherlandish paintings, with Joseph and the donkey in the middle distance, if they are visible at all. In a Gerard David in the National Gallery of Art in Washington, DC, Joseph is seen in the background gathering food by beating a chestnut tree with a long stick, a detail probably borrowed from miniatures of the Labours of the Months in the calendars of books of hours, and perhaps a northern substitute for the dates in the legends. The Washington painting appears to be the earliest in a number of paintings of the subject, or using the central figures in other contexts, that were apparently produced by transfer from copies of drawings. Many of these are loosely attributed to the large Bruges workshop of Adriaen Isenbrandt.

Despite the fact that on the Flight itself Joseph is invariably shown on foot, leading the donkey on which Mary and the child are seated, in Rests, Joseph is typically still shown standing, if not engaged in some activity. After the High Renaissance he often stands behind the Virgin, giving a pyramidal group of figures when she is flanked by angels. Relatively few depictions show him resting his feet seated next to Mary, or eating. These include an engraving of c. 1506 by Lucas van Leyden, and a chiaroscuro drawing by Hans Springinklee of 1514.

The wider landscape of the Patinir in the Prado allows space for depictions in the distance (at right) of the Massacre of the Innocents which provoked the flight, and the "miracle of the corn". The falling pagan idols are shown both on the top of the temple at far left (though a statue of a rat-headed god is intact) and by the pair of metal feet on the sphere next to the Virgin. The donkey is grazing some way off, and Joseph seems to have obtained a pot of milk, which he is carrying back. There are a number of versions by Patinir or his circle; other prolific makers of Rests include Jan Brueghel the Elder and Jan Brueghel the Younger and various collaborators, and Simone Cantarini (1612–1648). Part way through painting what would have been an early Italian version of the subject, Giovanni Cariani seems to have changed his mind and added shepherds to create an "eccentric" composition of the Adoration of the Shepherds (1515–17, Royal Collection).

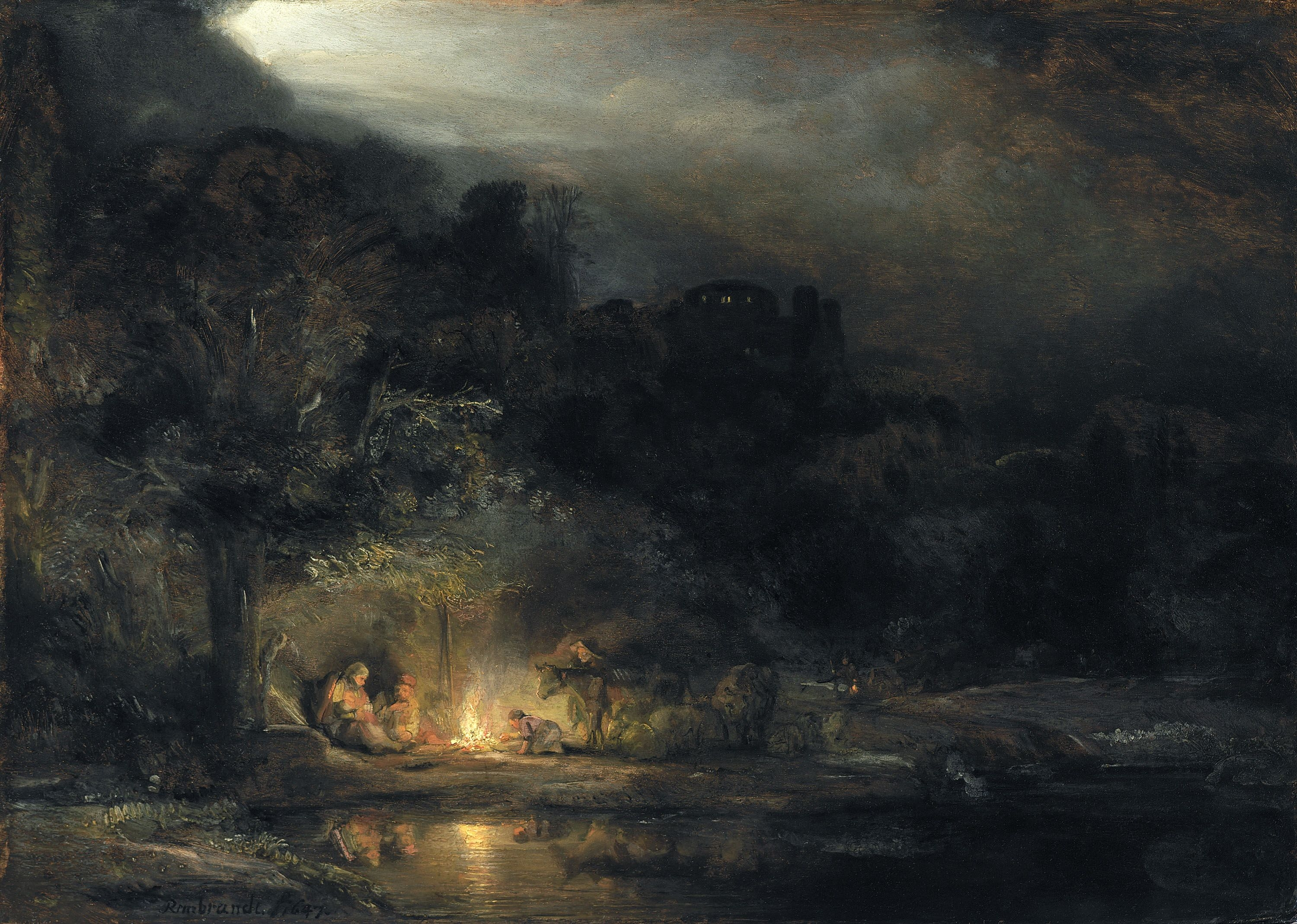
Rembrandt's only nightscape, 1647, National Gallery of Ireland

Untypical examples with specific activities include the famous Caravaggio, where Joseph holds the sheet music for an angel playing a viol; here both the Virgin and Child have fallen asleep. The only piece of detail the gospel gives is that the flight began "at night", but landscape scenes at night were very rare in art in the first centuries of the subject. In a night scene by Rembrandt (1647, Dublin), the family seem to have joined some herdsmen with a big fire for the night; this is his only night landscape. This relates to the painting of the Flight by Adam Elsheimer where they are just arriving at such an improvised encampment; Rembrandt would have known this from a print. Two other unusual treatments from Dutch Golden Age painting are a realist scene showing the family in more or less contemporary dress in a run-down Dutch tavern or farmhouse by Abraham Bloemaert (1634, Rijksmuseum), and one with Joseph reading from a large book, no doubt religious, by Aert de Gelder (c. 1690, Boston).

The subject is sometimes not easily distinguished from the Holy Family in Egypt, though the presence of the young John the Baptist, and a house nearby, suggest this, as the presence of the traditional ass or donkey suggests a Rest. In any case the "rest" was sometimes later interpreted to include the entire stay in Egypt, which according to the Golden Legend lasted seven years. A woodcut in Albrecht Dürer's series on the Life of the Virgin is always known as a Rest on the Flight, despite showing Joseph clearly well settled in Egypt, with a large house, and busy working on his carpentry, assisted by angels.

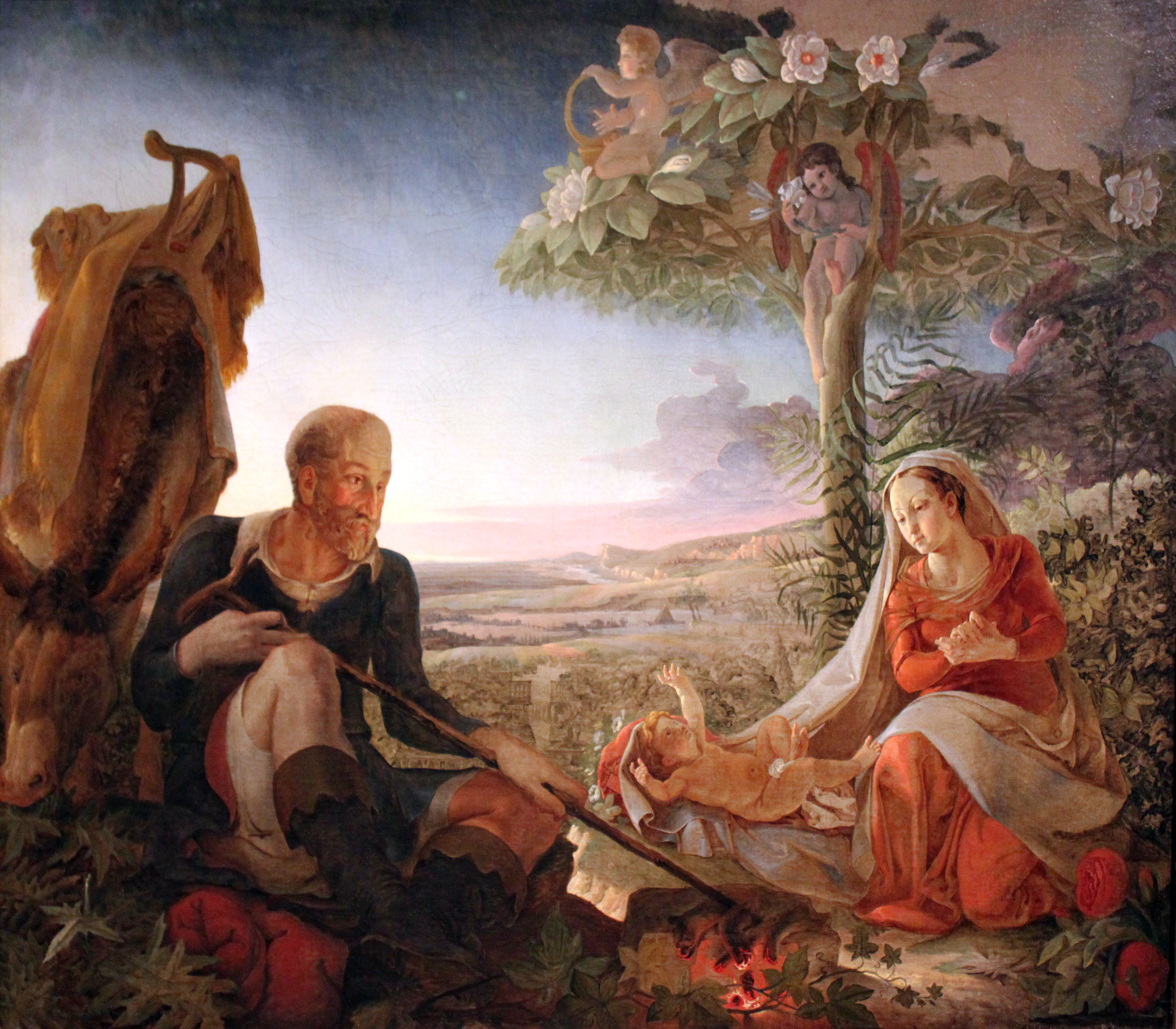
Philipp Otto Runge, 1805, Kunsthalle Hamburg

In the same way, depictions of the Flight which include the miracle of the date palm approach being a Rest, as in the influential engraving by Martin Schongauer (before 1491), where Mary remains sitting on the stationary donkey as Joseph gathers dates. From about 1550 Italian paintings often have infestations of putti-angels, following German examples in prints, and paintings from the first decade of the century by Lucas Cranach the Elder and Albrecht Altdorfer.

General trends in landscape painting affect treatments of the subject. Like the Flight, it was popular with Joachim Patinir and his circle, who set the family amid extensive world landscapes. Maryan Ainsworth contrasts this group, centred on the outward-looking international trading-centre of Antwerp, with the paintings dominated by large figures of the Virgin and Child produced by Gerard David and his circle, based in Bruges, a city that had lost commercial pre-eminence and was now turning in on itself.

18th-century depictions were often set beside classical ruins, and a few 19th-century ones featured Ancient Egyptian architecture. Some Romantic depictions placed the incident in lush paradisal settings, notably one that is "the first successful realization of Philipp Otto Runge's ambition to unite Christian orthodoxy with Romantic mysticism and his own personal cosmology", or, less appreciatively, one where "he seeks to express the working of divine forces in nature in a vague, emotional manner".

== Examples ==
- Rest on the Flight into Egypt, by Titian, c. 1512, Longleat House, Wiltshire
- Rest on the Flight to Egypt with Saint Francis, by Correggio, c. 1520, Uffizi, Florence.
- The Rest on the Flight into Egypt, by Paris Bordone, c. 1530, Musée des Beaux-Arts, Strasbourg
- Rest on the Flight into Egypt, c. 1597, by Caravaggio, Doria Pamphilj Gallery, Rome
- Rest on the Flight into Egypt, 1630, by Anthony van Dyck, Alte Pinakothek, Munich.
- The Rest on the Flight into Egypt, 1640s (?) oil on copper, by Pier Francesco Mola, Metropolitan Museum of Art, New York
- Rest on the Flight into Egypt, c.1665, by Bartolomé Esteban Murillo, Hermitage Museum, St Petersburg.

== Gallery ==
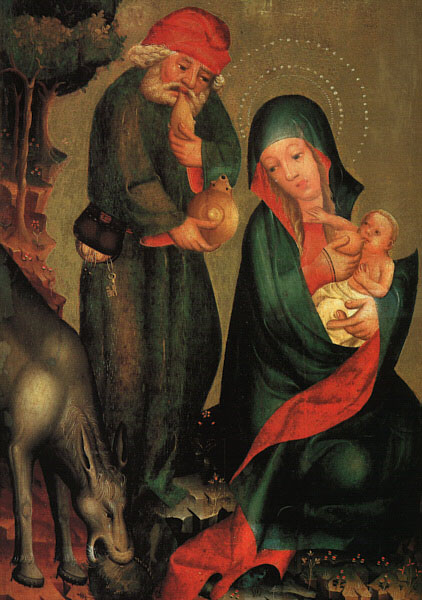
Meister Bertram von Minden, panel from the Grabow Altarpiece, c. 1379, the first known depiction

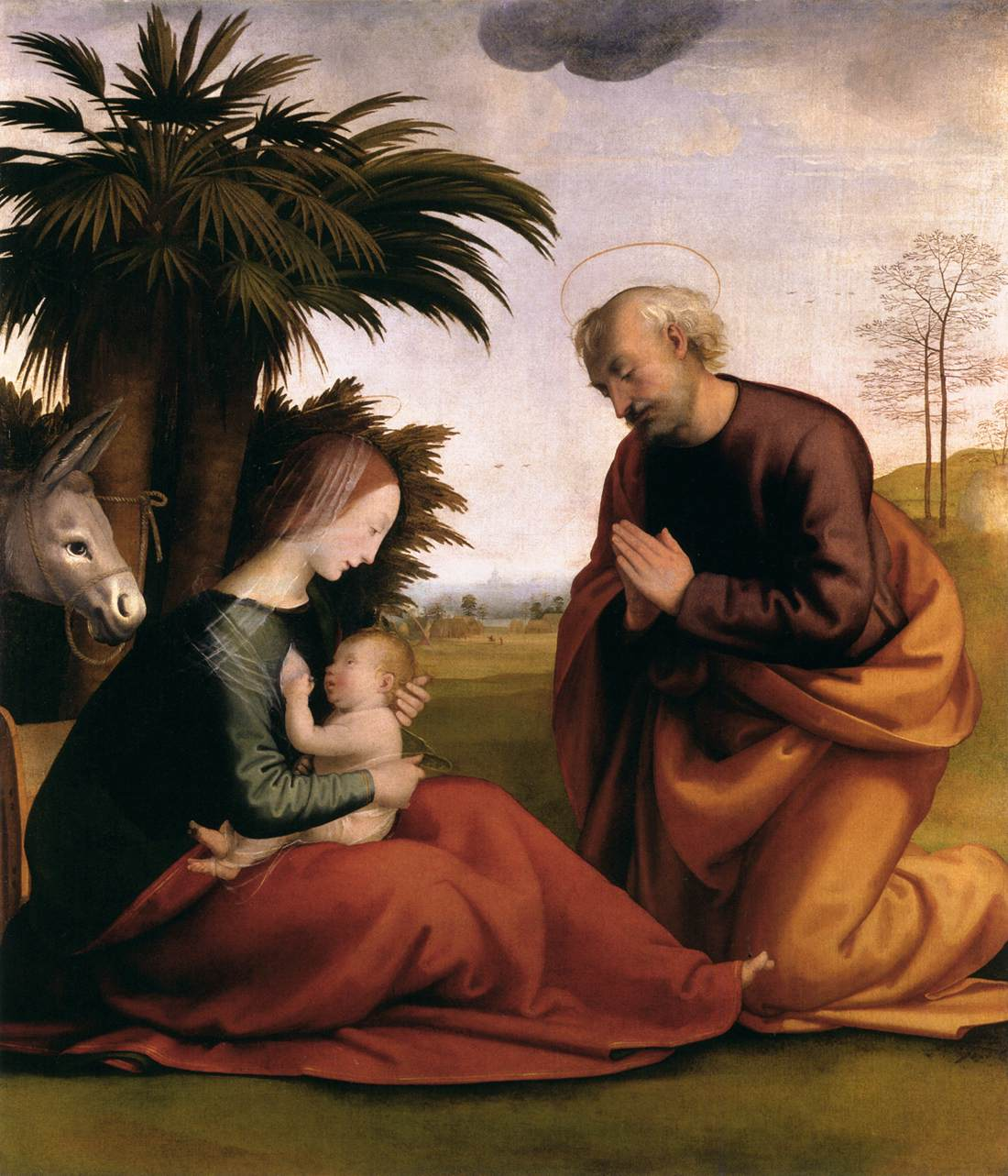
Fra Bartolomeo, 1500, an early Italian example, at the start of the popularity of the subject.

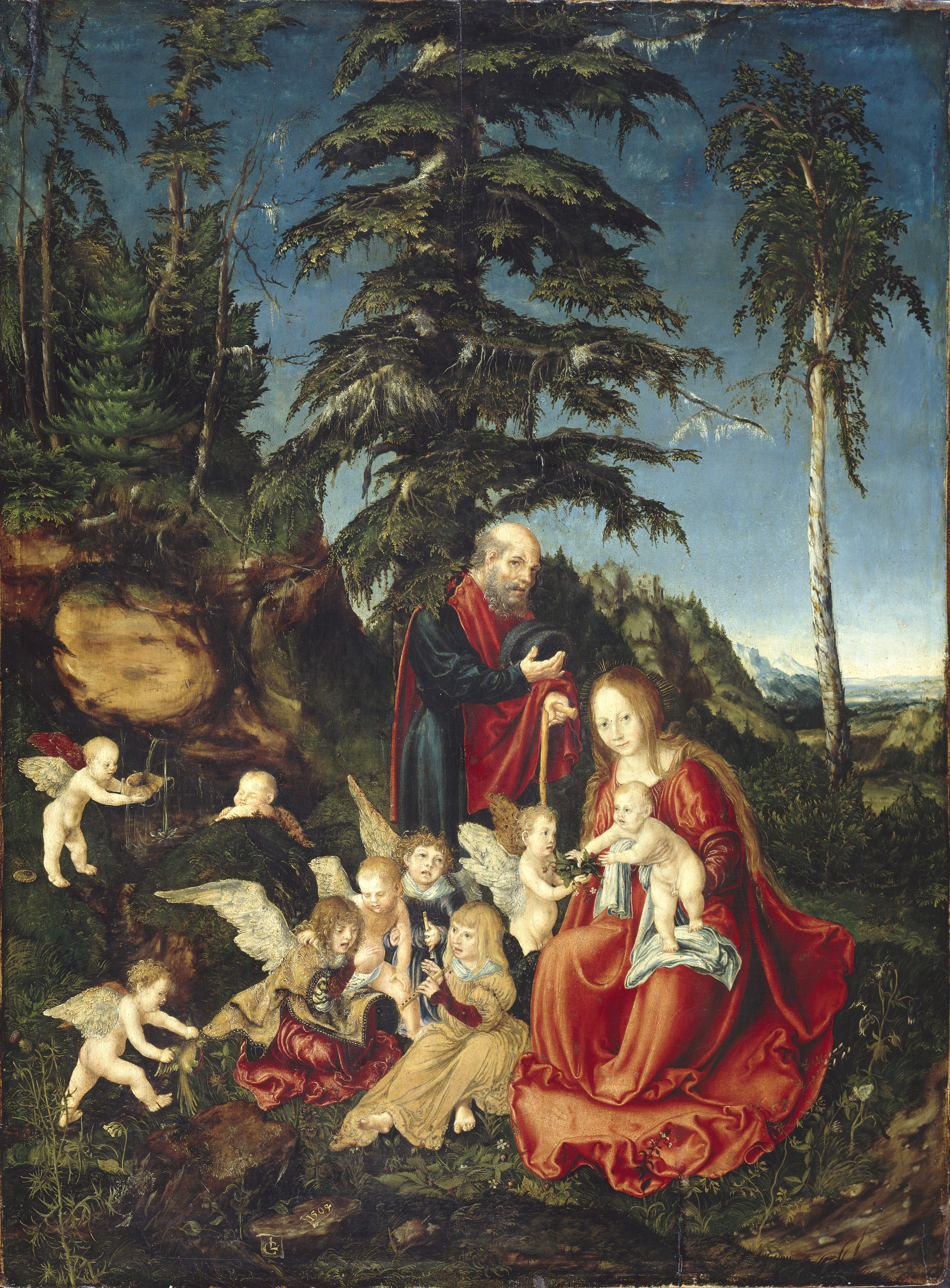
Lucas Cranach the Elder, 1504, Gemäldegalerie, Berlin

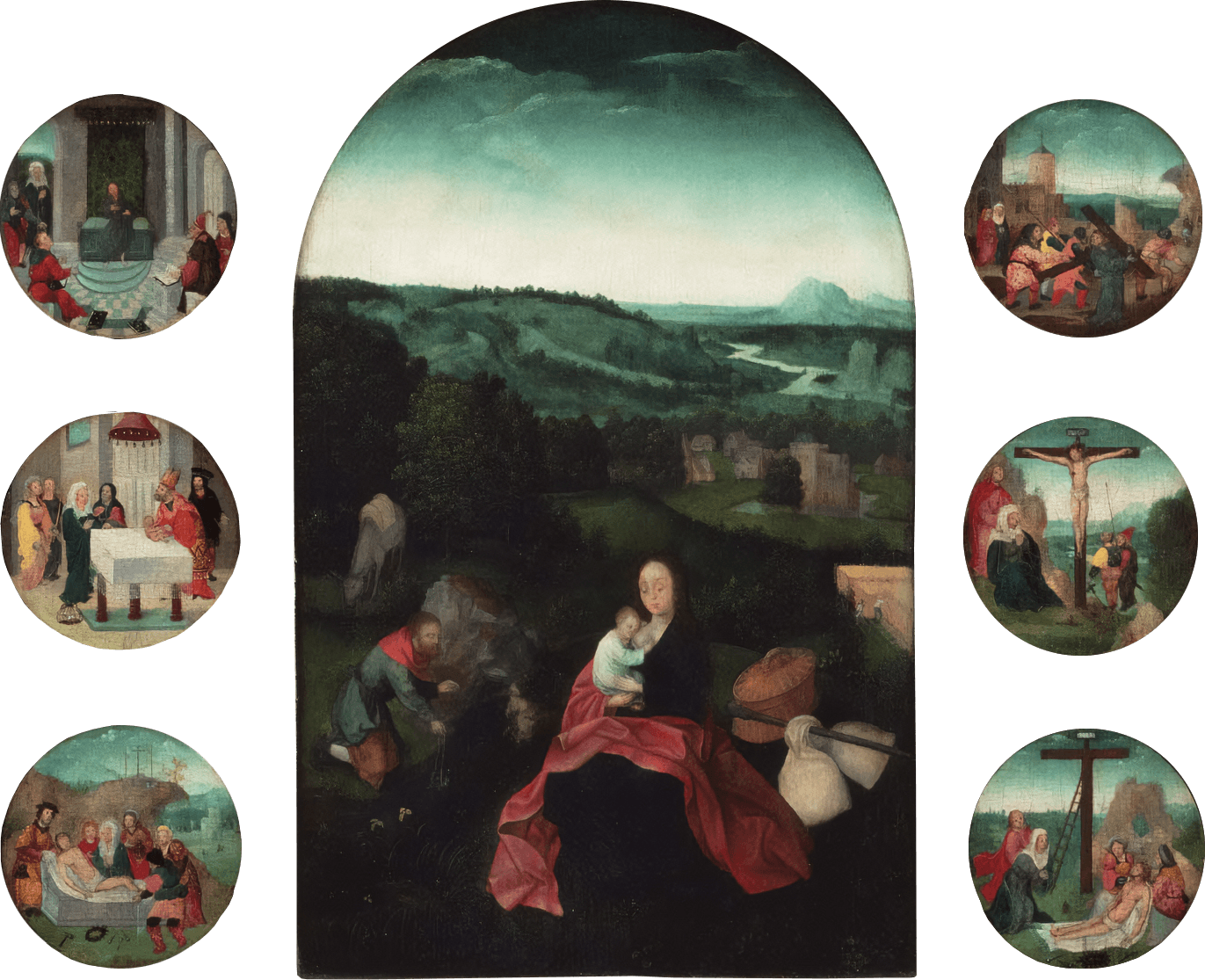
Follower of Joachim Patinir, c. 1515, main panel surrounded by smaller depictions of the life of Christ, National Museum of Western Art

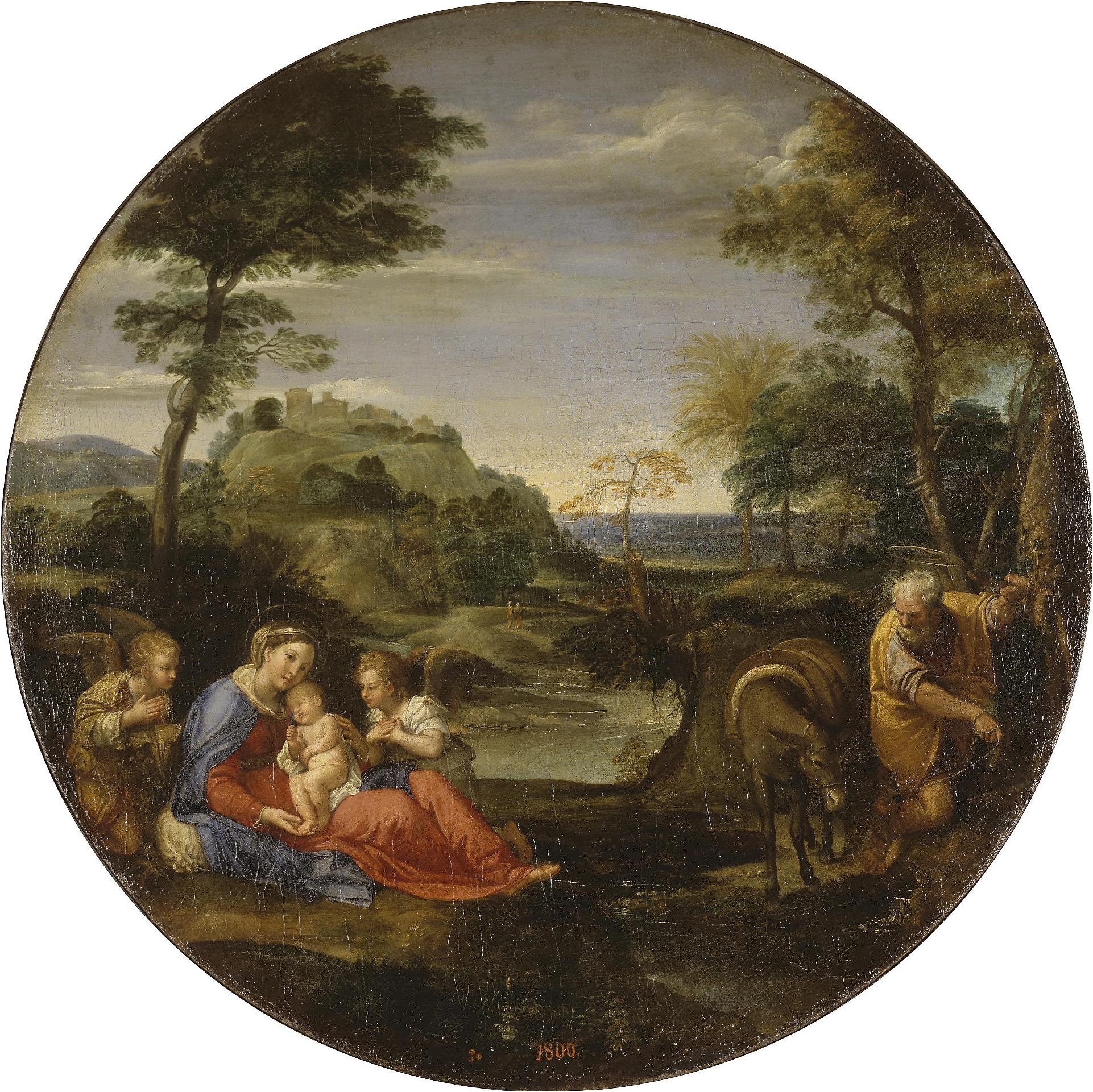
Annibale Carracci, c. 1604, Hermitage Museum

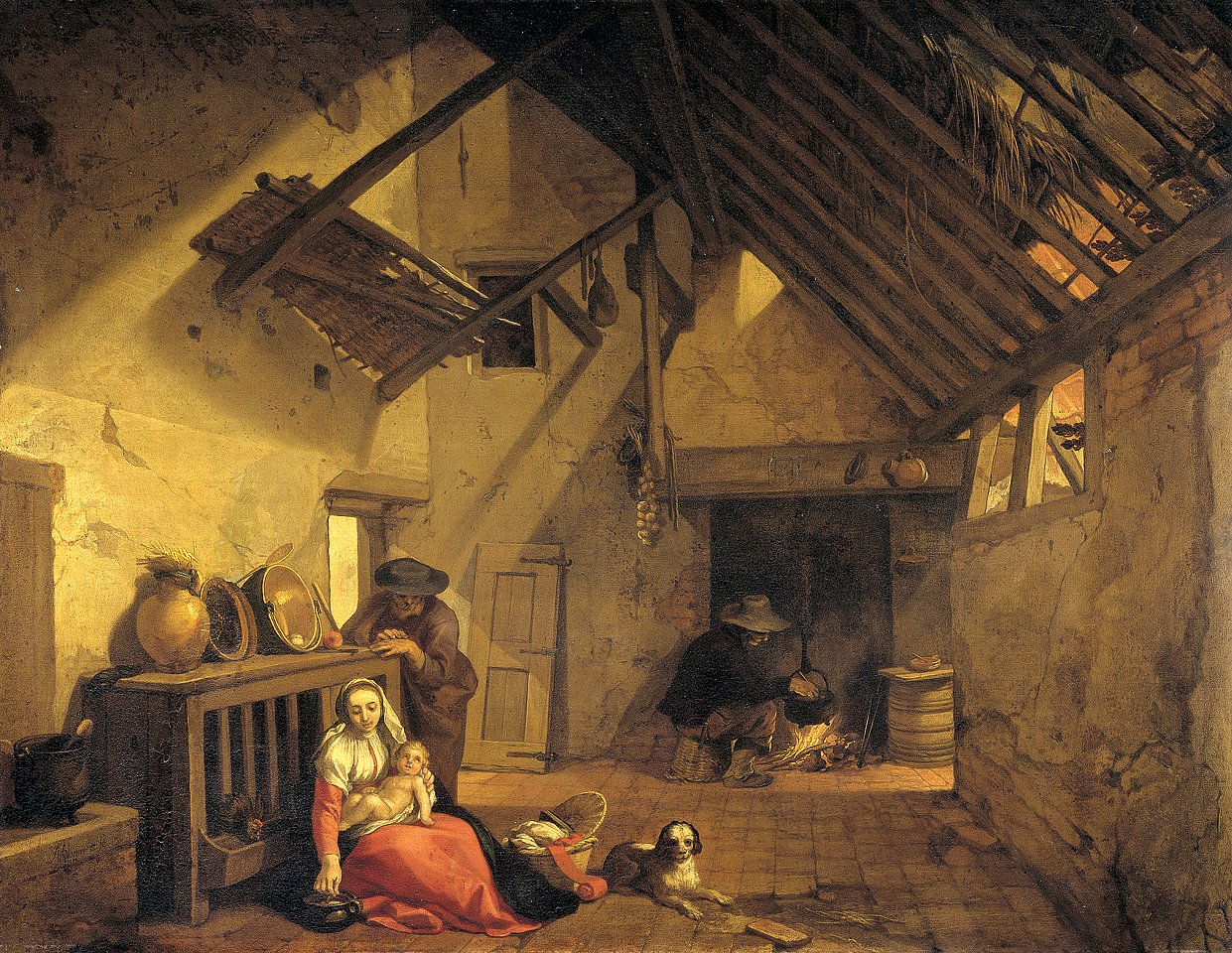
Abraham Bloemaert, 1632, Rijksmuseum

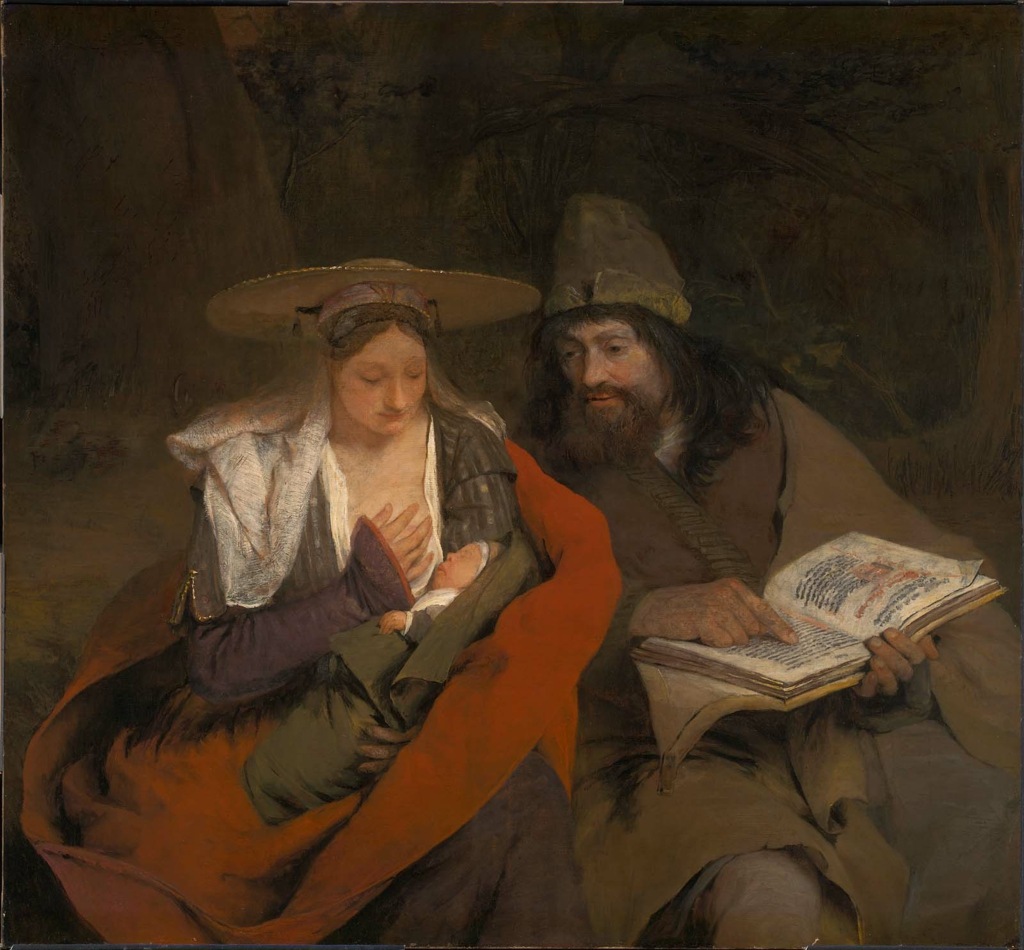
Aert de Gelder, c. 1690, Museum of Fine Arts, Boston

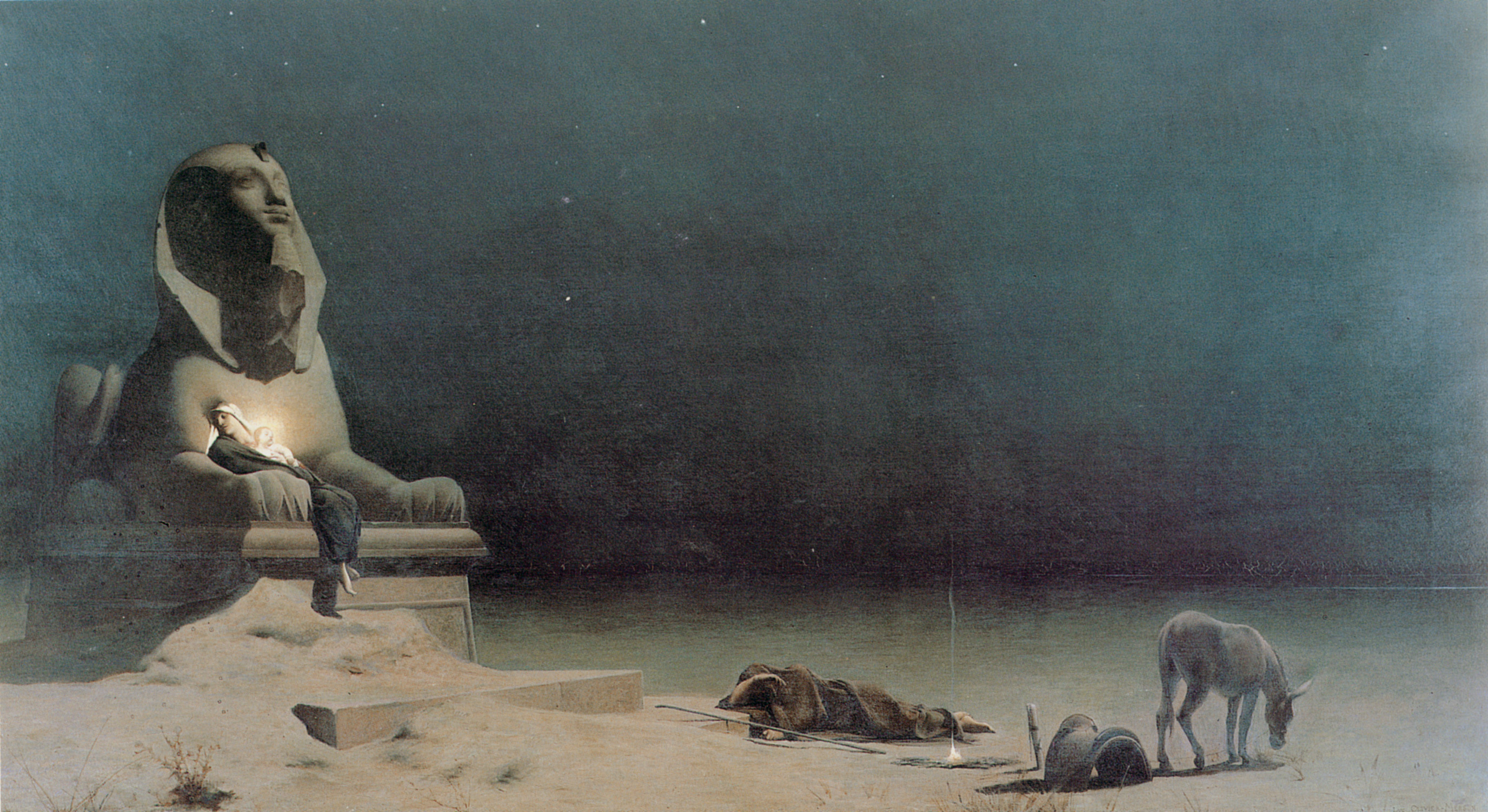
Luc-Olivier Merson, 1879. 19th-century historicism, MFA Boston
