= Nursing Madonna =

Image of the Virgin Mary breastfeeding the infant Jesus

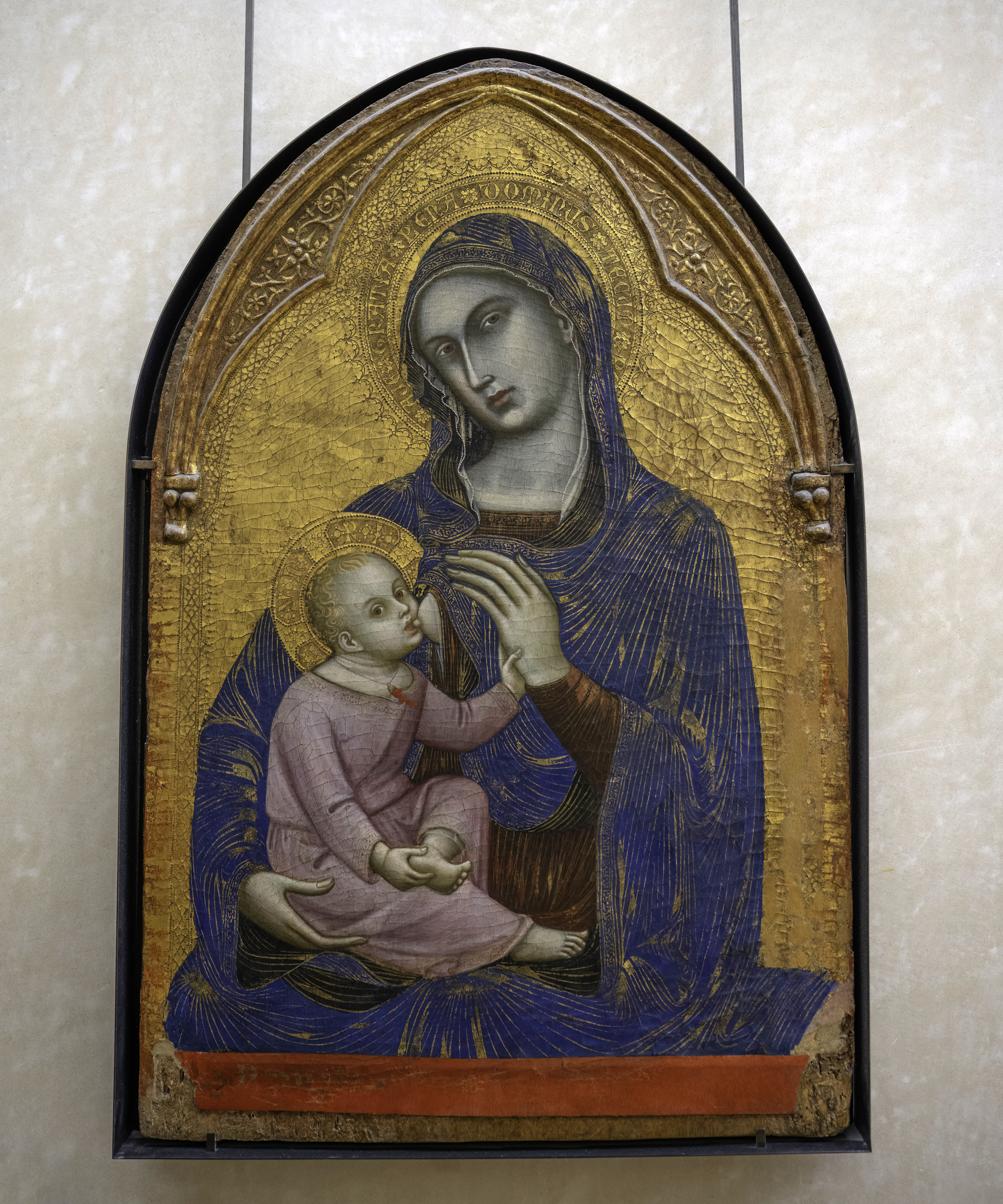
Barnaba da Modena, 1350–75, Louvre

The Nursing Madonna, Virgo Lactans, or Madonna Lactans, is an iconographic type of the Madonna and Child in which the Virgin Mary is shown breastfeeding the Child Jesus. In Italian, it is called the Madonna del Latte ("Madonna of Milk"). It was common in paintings until the change in atmosphere after the Council of Trent, when it was rather discouraged by the Catholic Church, at least in public contexts, on grounds of propriety.

The depiction is mentioned by Pope Gregory the Great, and a mosaic depiction probably of the 12th century is on the façade of Santa Maria in Trastevere in Rome, though few other examples date to before the Late Middle Ages. It survived in Eastern Orthodox icons (as Galaktotrophousa in Greek; Mlekopitatelnitsa in Russian), especially in Russia.

Usage of the depiction seems to have revived with the Cistercian Order in the 12th century, as part of the general upsurge in Marian theology and devotion. Milk was seen as "processed blood", and the milk of the Virgin to some extent paralleled the role of the Blood of Christ.

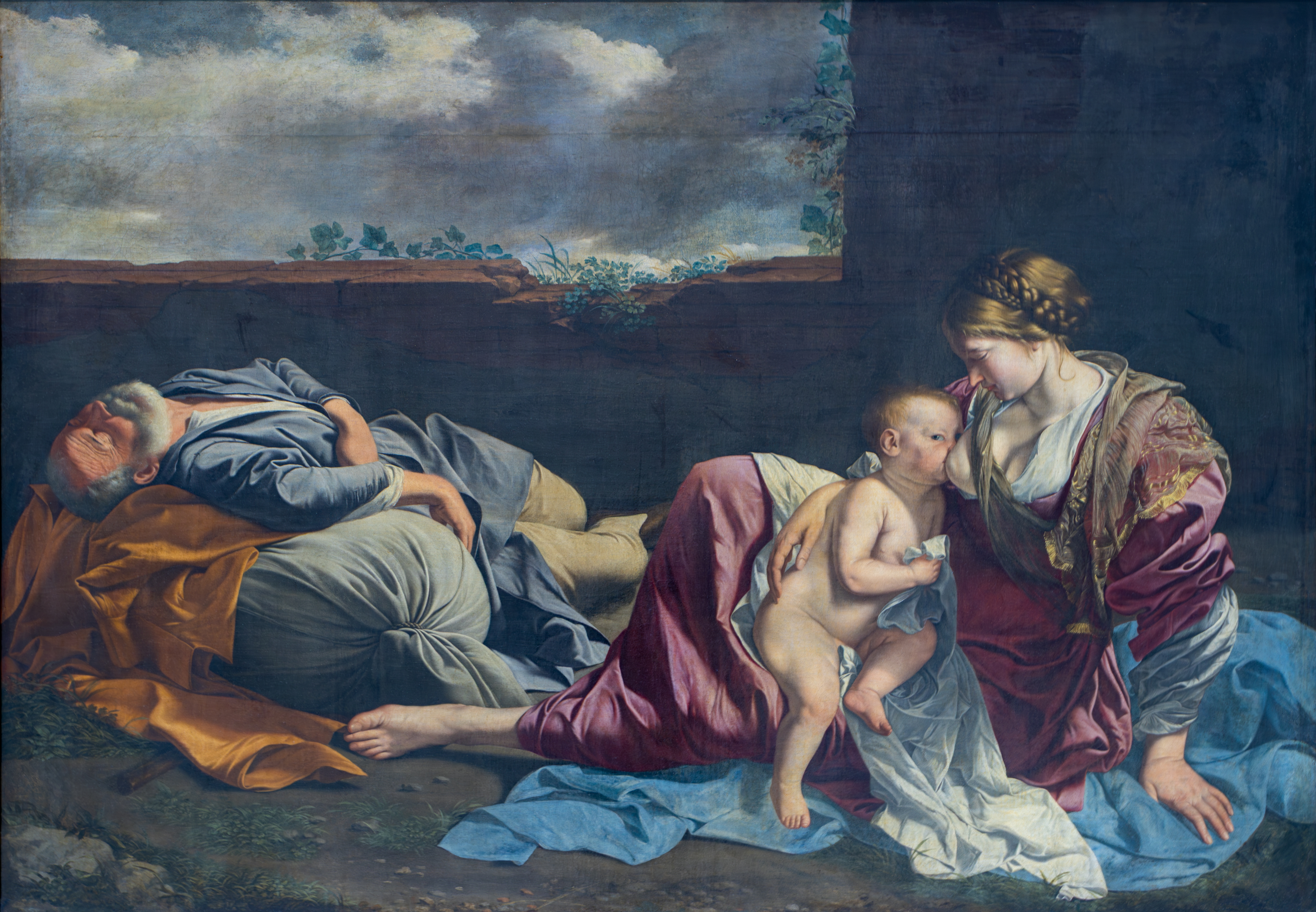
Rest on the Flight into Egypt, Orazio Gentileschi, c. 1628, Louvre

In the Middle Ages, the middle and upper classes usually contracted breastfeeding out to wetnurses, and depictions of the Nursing Madonna were linked with the Madonna of Humility, as the Virgin was in more ordinary clothes than the royal robes shown, for instance, in images of the Coronation of the Virgin, and she is often seated on the ground. The first half of the 13th century produced more than one hundred surviving paintings. The appearance of such paintings in Tuscany in the early 14th century was something of a visual revolution, partly replacing Queen of Heaven depictions; they were also popular in Iberia.

== Late Middle Ages and decline ==
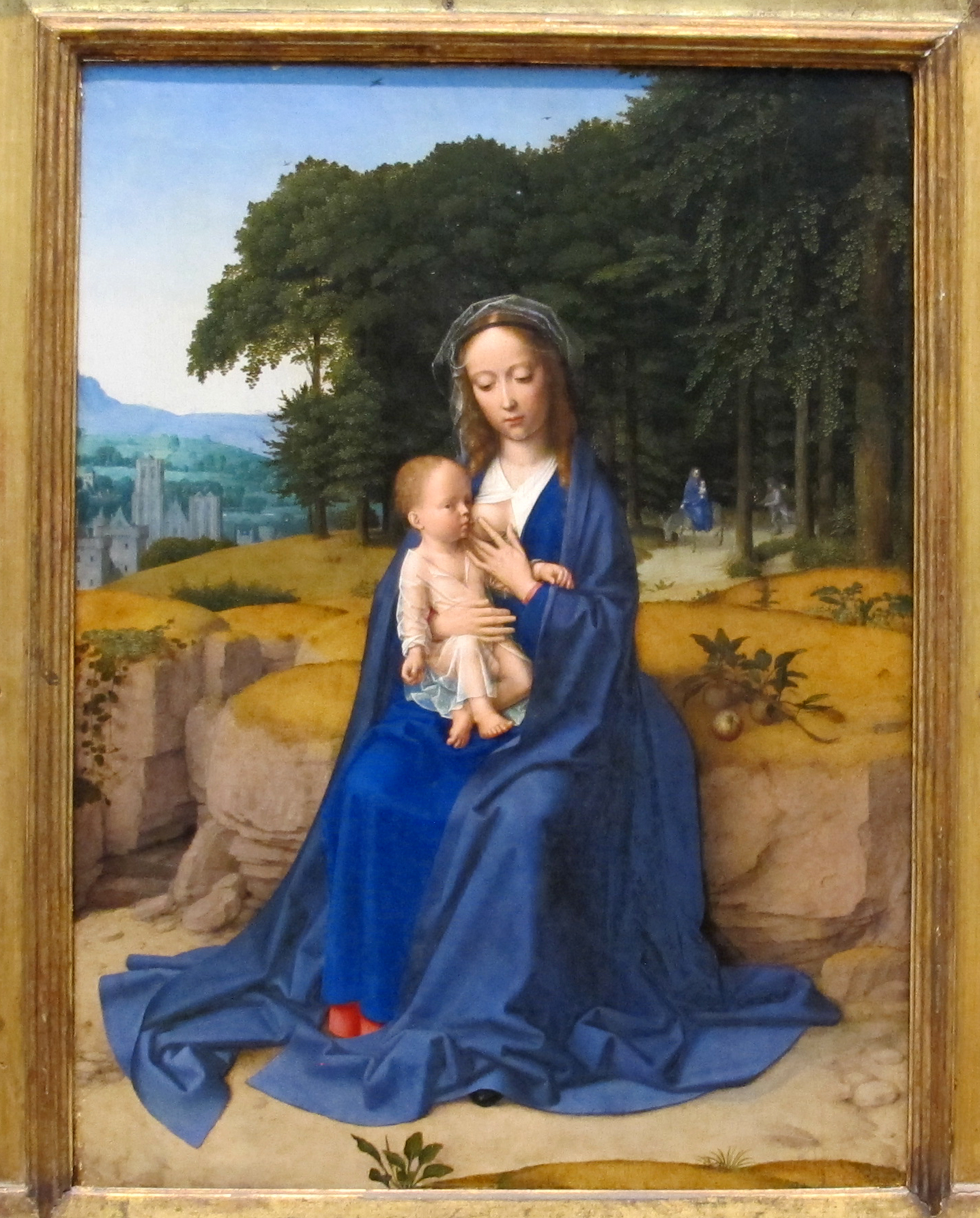
Rest on the Flight into Egypt, Gerard David, 1512–15

Most Late Mediaeval paintings are smaller devotional panels containing only the two essential figures, sometimes with small angels. But the Nursing Madonna is sometimes the centre of a sacra conversazione with various saints, and perhaps donor portraits.

In Dutch and Flemish Renaissance painting, especially in Antwerp, variants of the newly-popular subject of the Holy Family (a Virgin and Child with Saint Joseph) with a Nursing Madonna appeared in the early 16th century; Joos van Cleve painted many of these. These were on small devotional panels for the homes of the rich rather than churches. Several compositions were copied by different artists, probably from drawings passed around. Drawing on a passage by Ludolph of Saxony, the subject could also be turned into a Rest on the Flight into Egypt, with the attraction of a landscape background. Saint Joseph might be shown close to the Virgin, or as a small figure foraging in the background, as Gerard David's painting does. Sometimes the Virgin is breastfeeding while riding on the back of the ass, as early as a 12th-century miniature in Saint Catherine's Monastery, Mount Sinai.

Another composition from the same Flemish milieu, mostly found on the cheaper support of linen rather than panel, appears to have been connected with devotions to the Immaculate Conception. This just shows the Virgin, looking down, and the Child.

Another type of depiction, also less popular after Trent, showed Mary baring her breast in a traditional gesture of female supplication to Christ when asking for his mercy upon sinners in a Deësis or Last Judgement scene. A good example is the fresco at S. Agostino in San Gimignano, by Benozzo Gozzoli, painted to celebrate the end of the plague.

The Nursing Madonna survived into the Baroque; examples include some depictions of the Holy Family, by El Greco for example, and narrative scenes such as the Rest on the Flight into Egypt, for example by Orazio Gentileschi (versions in Birmingham and Vienna).

== Lactatio Bernardi ==
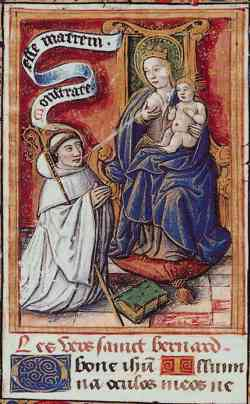
Saint Bernard receiving milk from the breast of the Virgin Mary. The scene is a legend which allegedly took place at Speyer Cathedral in 1146.

A variant, known as the Lactation of St Bernard (Lactatio Bernardi in Latin, or simply Lactatio) is based on a miracle or apparition to Saint Bernard of Clairvaux, wherein the Virgin sprinkled her milk on his lips (some versions show him awake in prayer before an image of the Madonna, while others have him asleep). He usually kneels before a Madonna Lactans, and as the Child Jesus sits on Her lap, the Virgin squeezes milk from Her breast which is received by the saint. The milk was variously said to have given him wisdom, shown that the Virgin was also his spiritual mother (and to mankind in general), or cured an eye infection. In this form the Nursing Madonna survived into Baroque art, and sometimes the Rococo, as in the high altar at Kloster Aldersbach.

== Gallery ==
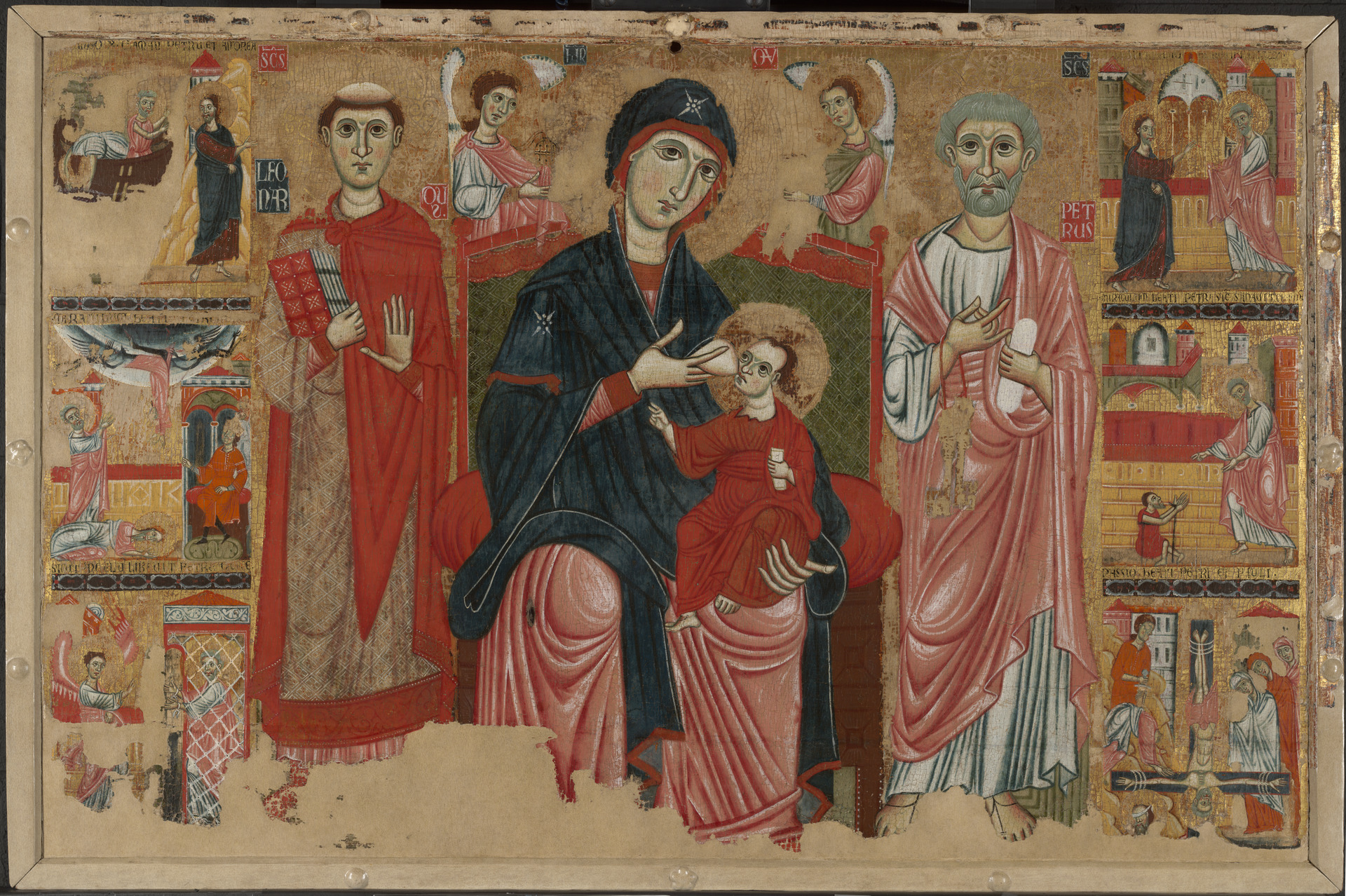
Master of the Magdalen, with Saints Leonard and Peter and Scenes from the Life of Saint Peter, c. 1270

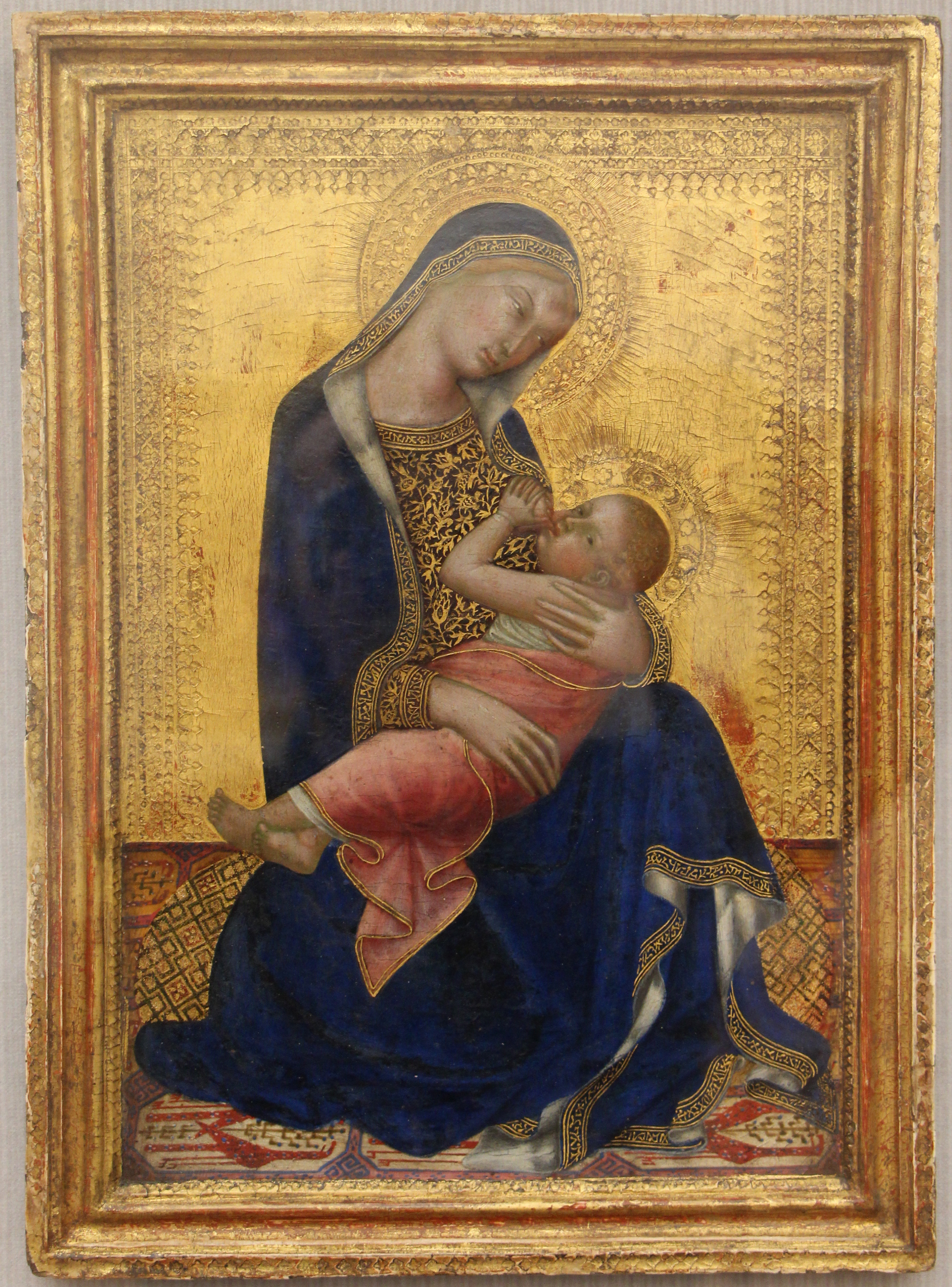
Lippo Memmi or circle, c. 1340–50

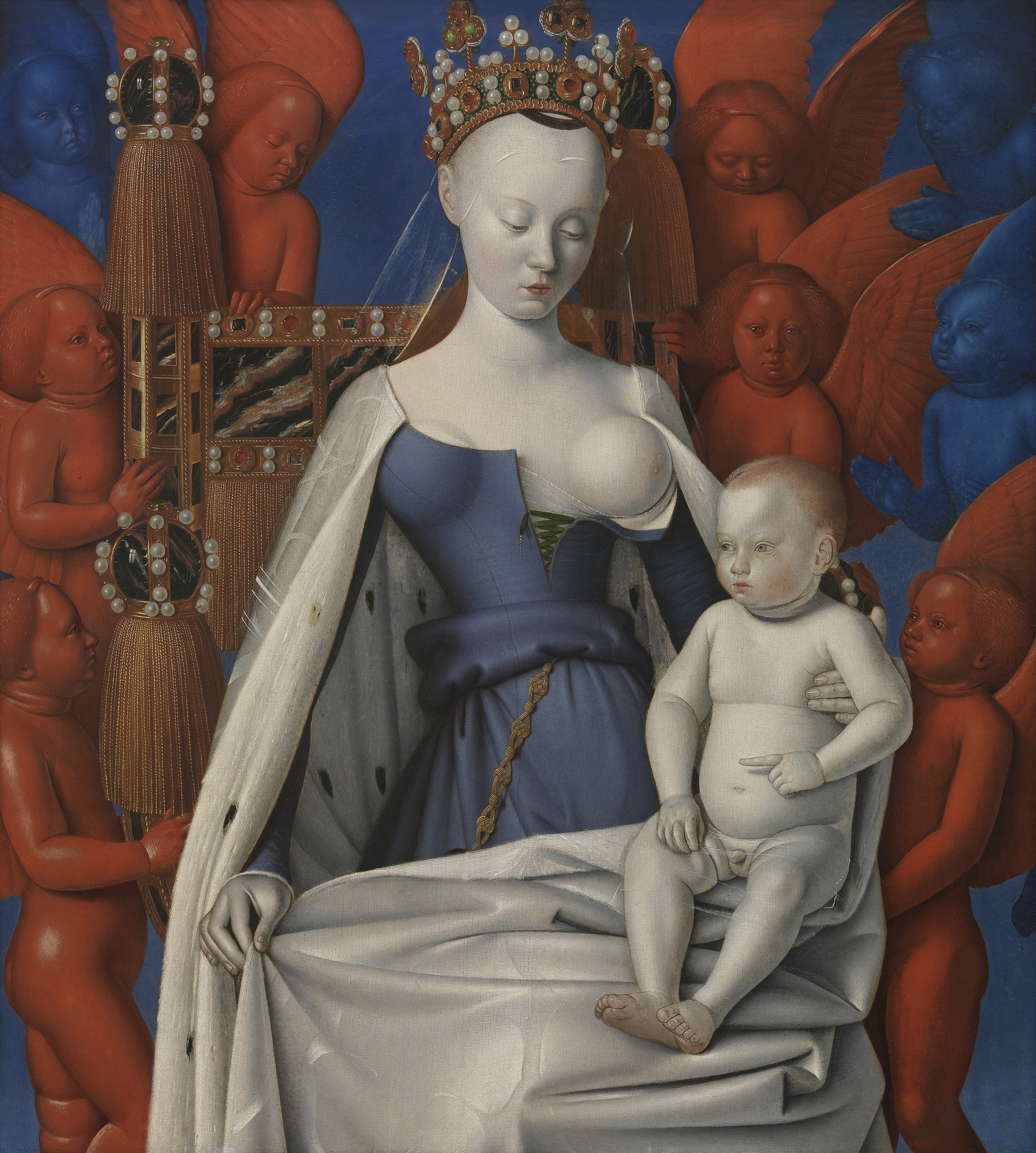
Right wing of the Melun Diptych, c. 1452, Jean Fouquet

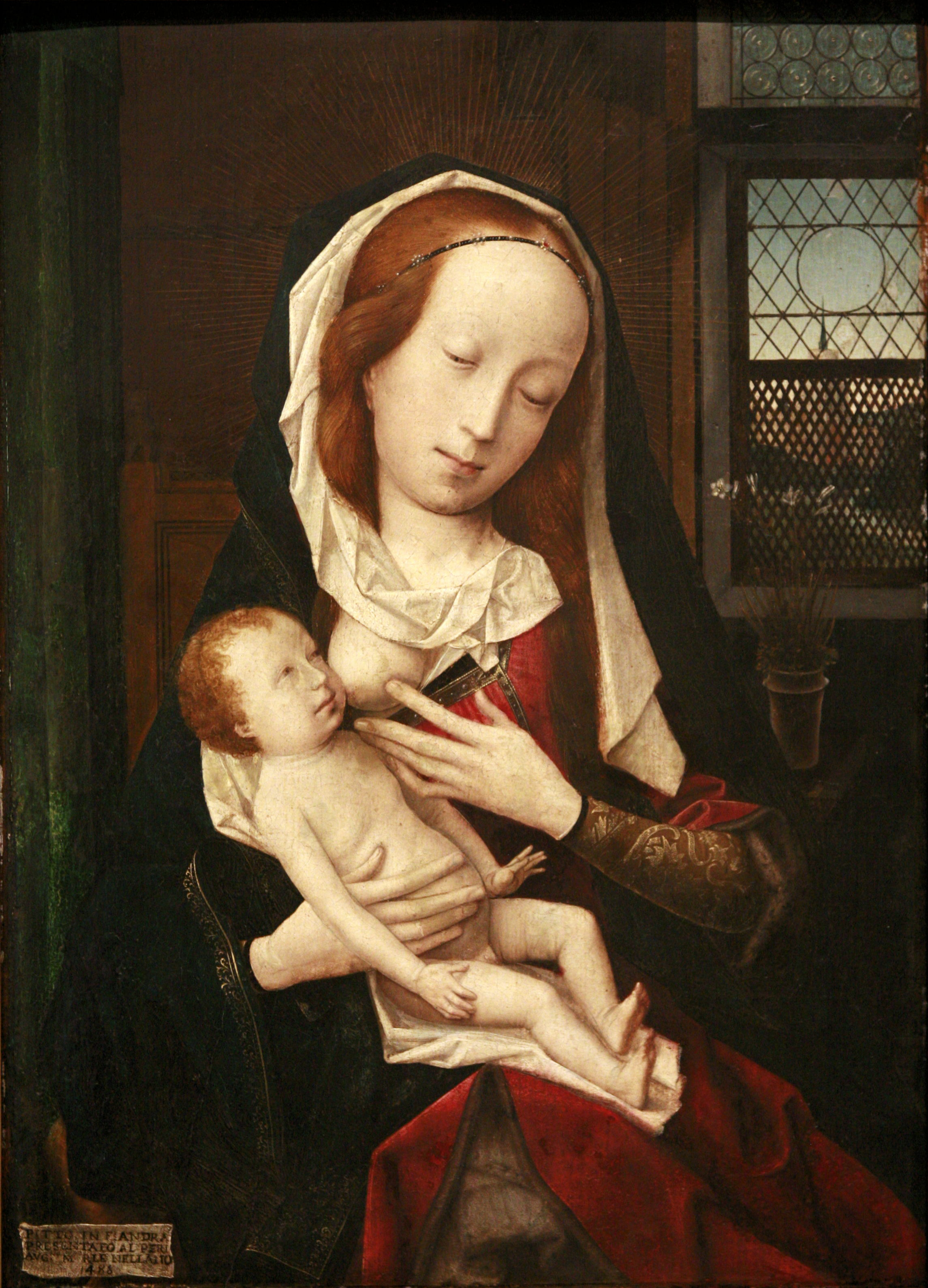
Nursing Madonna (ca. 1500 or after), by Jan Provoost

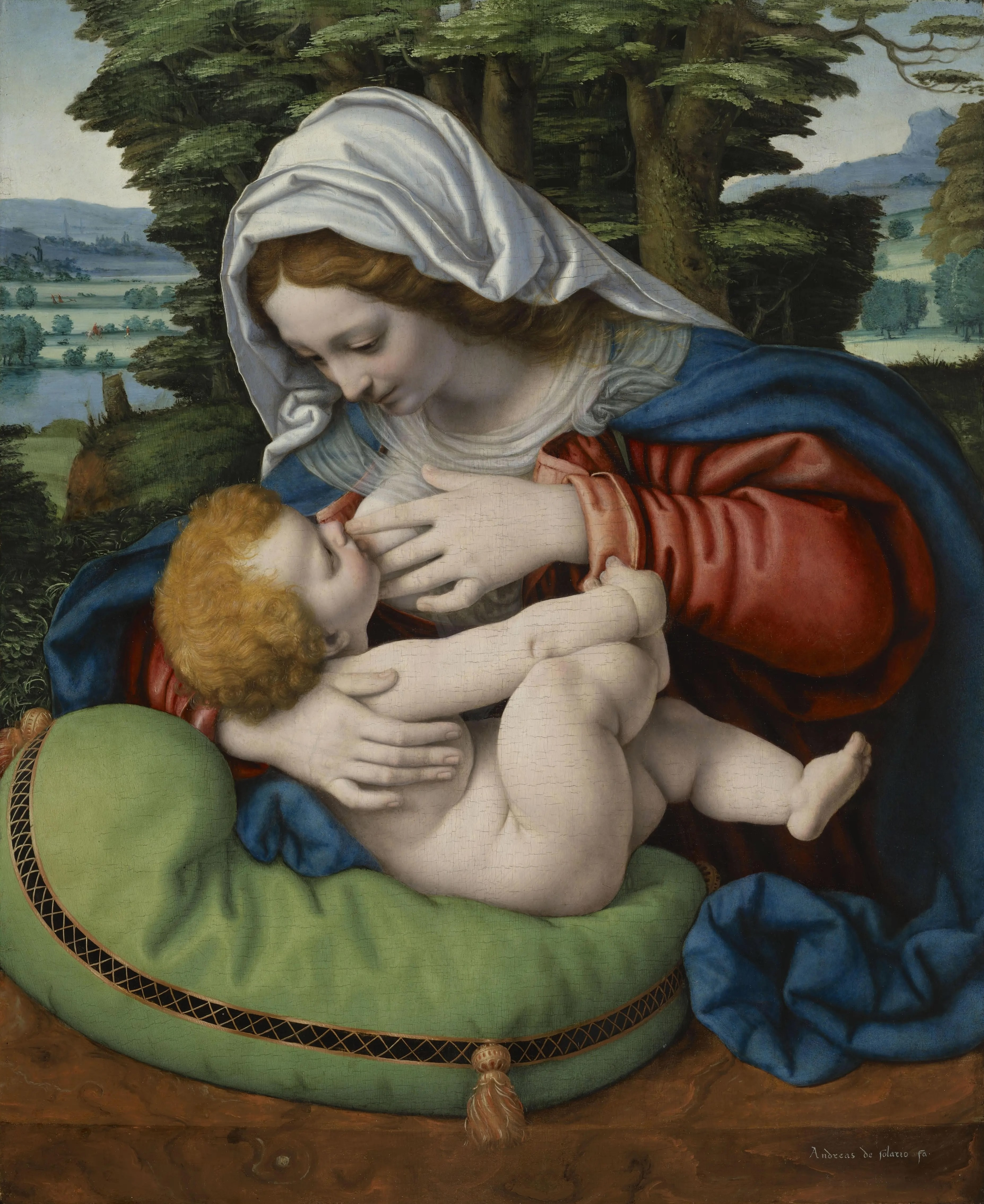
Andrea Solario, Madonna of the Green Cushion, c. 1507–10

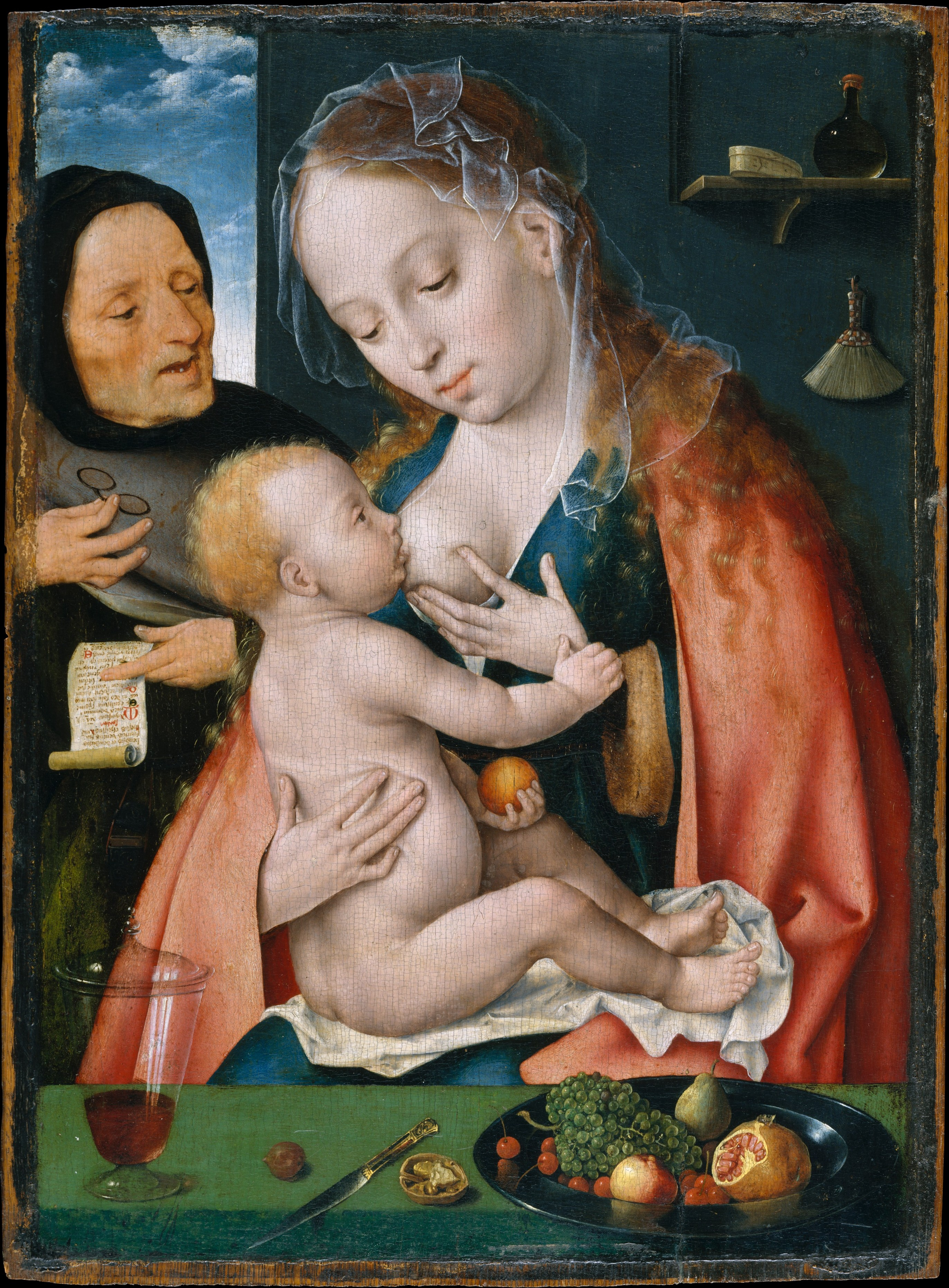
Holy Family, Joos van Cleve, c. 1512–13

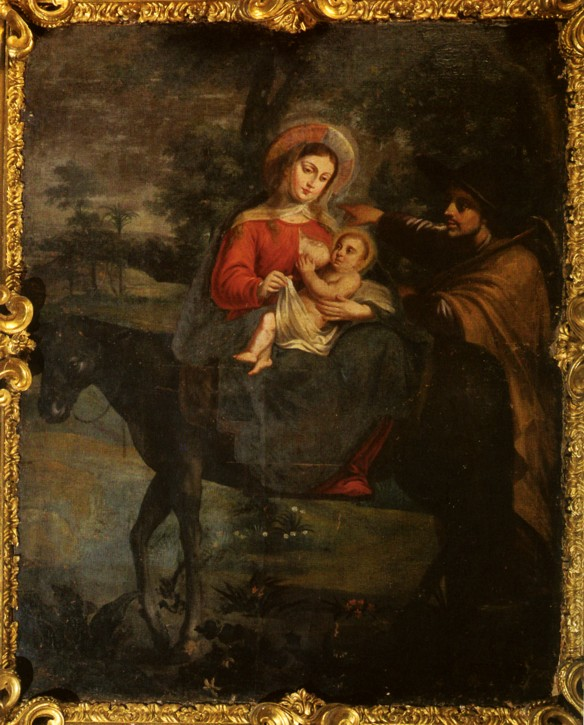
During the Flight into Egypt, André Gonçalves, Portugal, before 1755

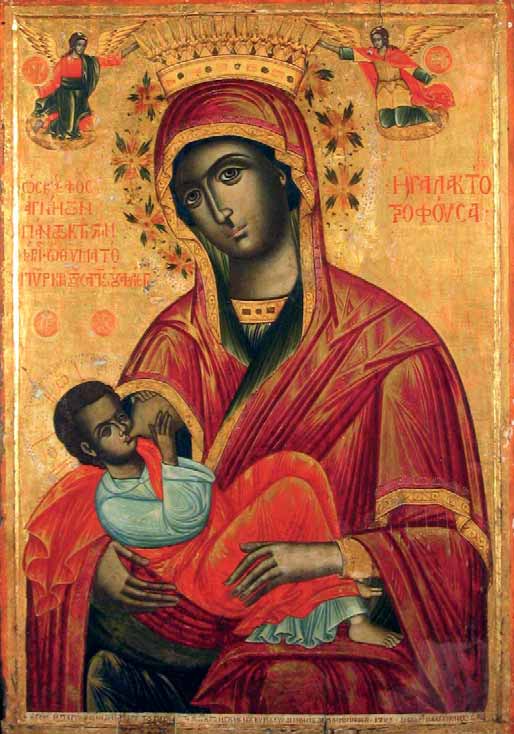
Galaktotrophousa Makarios, Greece c. 1784

== See also ==
- Breastfeeding in art
- Madonna Litta
- Chapel of the Milk Grotto, Bethlehem

== Sources ==
- Ainsworth, Maryan Wynn et al., From Van Eyck to Bruegel: Early Netherlandish Paintings in the Metropolitan Museum of Art, 2009, Metropolitan Museum of Art, 2009. ISBN 0-8709-9870-6, google books
