= Rest on the Flight into Egypt (van Dyck) =

Painting by Anthony van Dyck

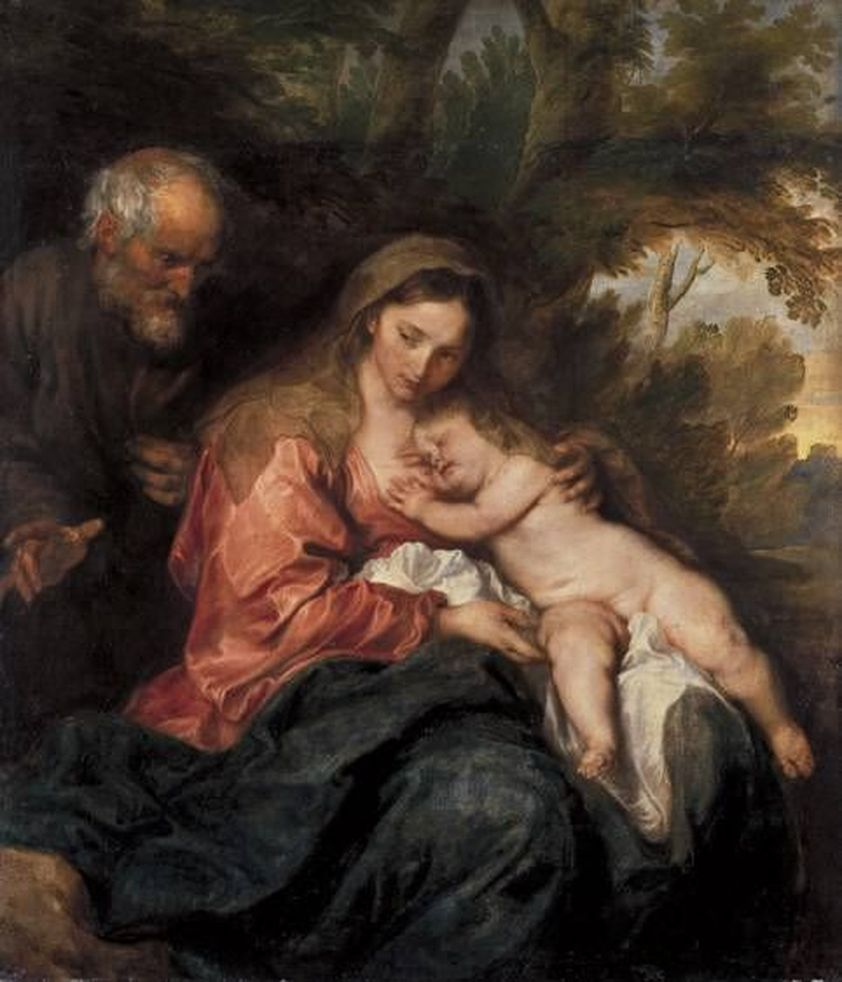
Rest on the Flight into Egypt (1630) by Anthony van Dyck

Rest on the Flight into Egypt is a 1630 painting by Anthony van Dyck, probably commissioned by a layman. Featuring the Holy Family of Joseph, Mary, and Jesus, it was owned by Maximilian II Emanuel, Elector of Bavaria and is now in the Alte Pinakothek in Munich. The Rest on the Flight into Egypt was a popular subject in art.

== See also ==
- List of paintings by Anthony van Dyck

== Bibliography ==
- Gian Pietro Bellori, Vite de' pittori, scultori e architecti moderni, Torino, Einaudi, 1976.
- Didier Bodart, Van Dyck, Prato, Giunti, 1997.
- Christopher Brown, Van Dyck 1599-1641, Milano, RCS Libri, 1999, ISBN 88-17-86060-3.
- Justus Müller Hofstede, Van Dyck, Milano, Rizzoli/Skira, 2004.
- Stefano Zuffi, Il Barocco, Verona, Mondadori, 2004.
