= Adoration of the Shepherds (Cariani) =

Painting by Giovanni Cariani

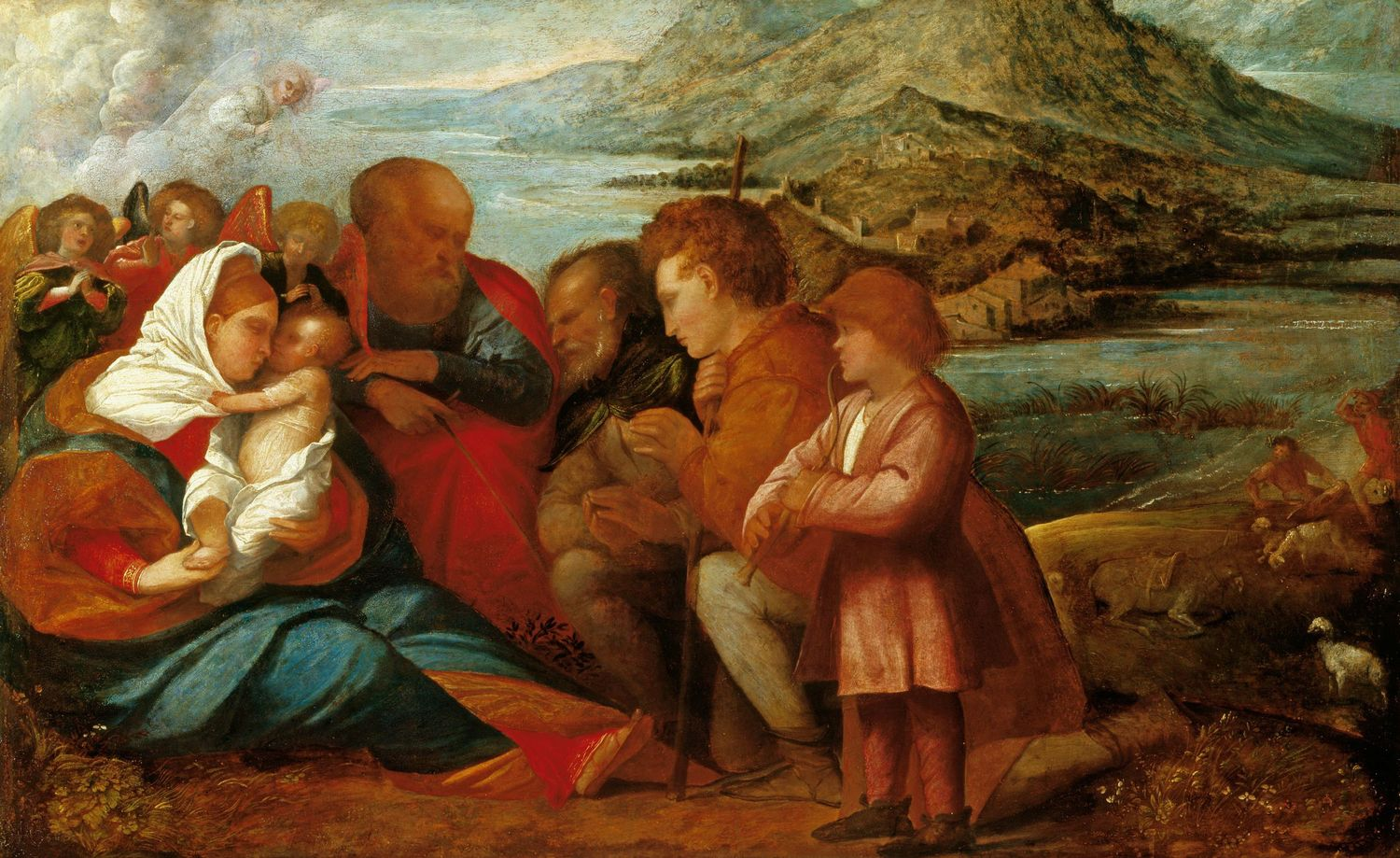
Adoration of the Shepherds

The Adoration of the Shepherds is a panel painting of about 1515–1517 by the Italian painter Giovanni Cariani, now in the Royal Collection of the United Kingdom. The painting is somewhat damaged, and also seems to have been subject to significant changes of intention during the process of painting. It was one of the large group of paintings bought by Charles I of England from the collection of Vincenzo II, last of the Gonzaga Dukes of Mantua in 1628. The painted surface measures 73.6 cm × 120.3 cm (29.0 in × 47.4 in).

== Composition and condition ==
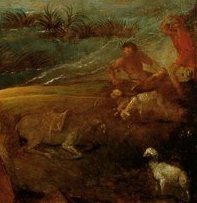
The shepherds at the right

The main figures are all in a crowd at the left side of the painting, and the top and right-hand side of the painting show an extensive landscape of lake and mountain seen from a high viewpoint. This "eccentric" composition, "most unusual for an Adoration", may be explained by the painting having started out as a Rest on the Flight into Egypt, without the shepherds. This was the suggestion of John Shearman in his catalogue. Cariani, especially in his early period, had a taste for wide horizontal compositions, and also overlapping figures at the front of the picture space.

The extensive landscape is of the world landscape type, mostly found in northern paintings at this early date. This was being developed by Joachim Patinir in Antwerp, and if the painting is dated to 1515–1517, Cariani was remarkably quick in using it. Details of the landscape are re-used in later paintings by Cariani, and an interest in German art becomes unmistakable in some later works of his. Here the "angular poses of the figures and the nervous quality of the highlights" may show an early interest. A landscape of lakes and hills is characteristic of Cariani's native Bergamesca region.

Three shepherds, forming a set of the "three ages of Man" are shown in the centre; all have rather small legs, with the centre one conspicuously out of proportion. The youngest is playing a wind instrument of the shawm family. Two more "summarily painted" shepherds at the far right are being given the news of Jesus' birth by angels. Three angels are ranged behind the Virgin and Child, and another emerges from a cloud above this group. There are more angels in the sky, but it seems Cariani overpainted these, before allowing them to dry properly. This has created "pronounced craquelure in this area". A subsequent 20th-century restoration partly revealed the one now visible, which cannot be seen in the earliest photographs. The painting is abraded, probably in an over-enthusiastic restoration in the 19th century, but "much of the detail is still intact".

== Artist ==
Giovanni Cariani (c. 1485 – after 1547) was probably a native of Bergamo, or just outside the city, and spent his career there or in Venice, where he formed part of a group of Lombard artists, led by Palma Vecchio, also from Bergamo, and including Girolamo Savoldo from Brescia. He shared to a particular degree their attraction to realism and rather conservative style, looking back to Giovanni Bellini and Vittore Carpaccio, but accommodating aspects of the new Venetian style of Giorgione and Titian. He was in Venice by 1508, but was back in Bergamo by 1517, remaining there until he returned to Venice in 1523.

== Provenance and attribution ==
The early history of the painting rests on a "CR" (Carolus Rex, "King Charles") branded on the back of the poplar panel, and a label "now almost illegible", reading "From Mantua / 1628 / No. 153". However, it is not clearly recorded in the incomplete lists of either the Gonzaga collection or that of Charles I. It is "probably" recorded in inventories of Charles II of England in 1666–67 and James II of England in 1688.

The painting, like very many others, was attributed to Giorgione until Cariani was suggested by Crowe and Cavalcaselle in the later 19th century. This has been generally accepted as the painting shows many characteristic traits found in his paintings.
