= Nursing Madonna (Jan Provoost) =

Painting by Jan Provoost

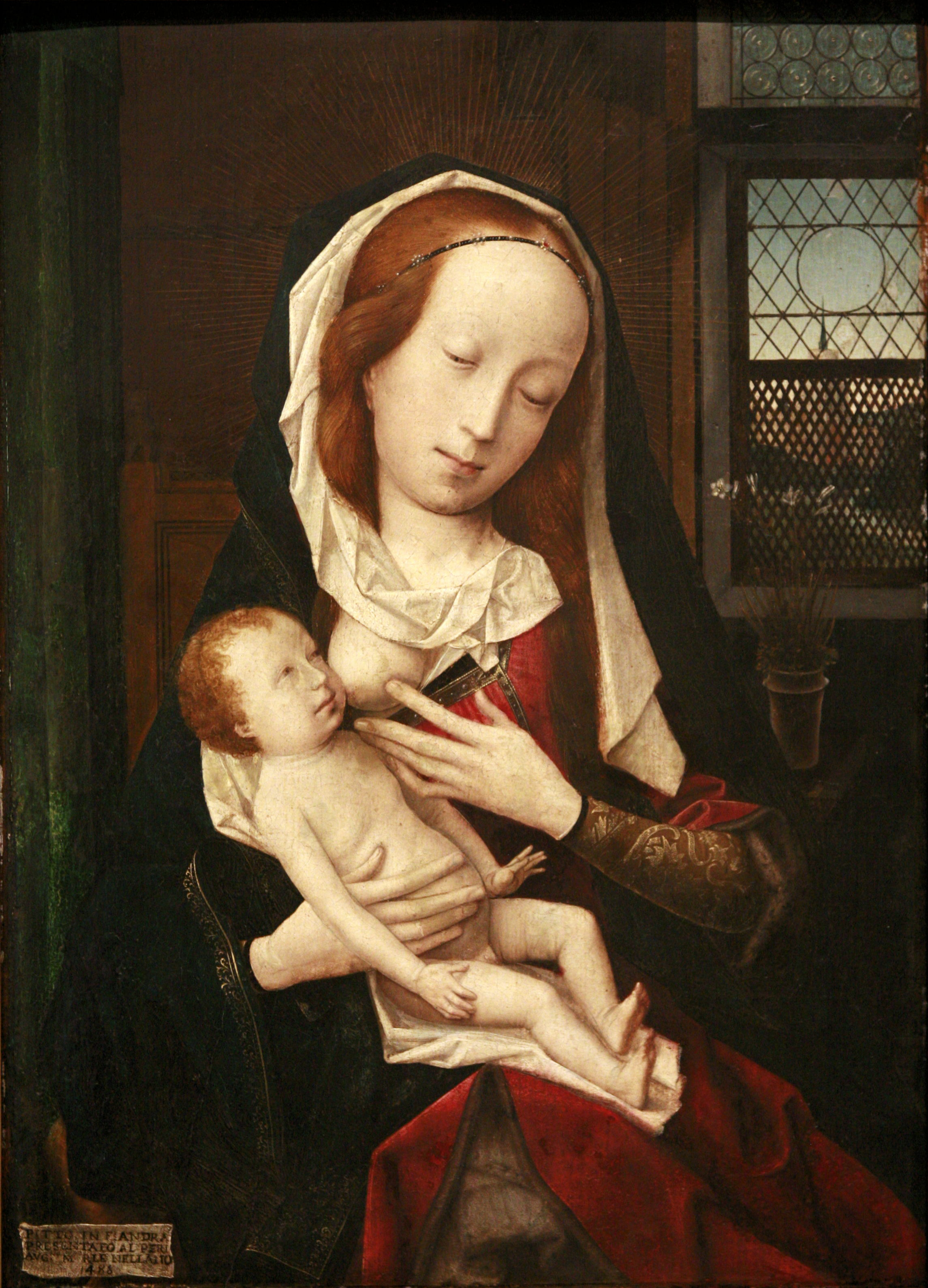
- Artist: Jan Provoost
- Year: between circa 1500 and 1510
- Medium: oil painting on panel
- Movement: Early Netherlandish painting Religious art
- Subject: Nursing Madonna
- Dimensions: 57 cm × 40 cm (22 in × 16 in)
- Location: Musée des Beaux-Arts, Strasbourg
- Accession: 1893

Nursing Madonna is an early 16th-century painting by the Netherlandish artist Jan Provoost. It is now in the Musée des Beaux-Arts of Strasbourg, France. Its inventory number is 268.

The painting was bought from the Paris art dealer Édouard Warneck in 1893, as a work by a follower of Rogier van der Weyden. It was attributed to Provoost by Georges Hulin de Loo in 1902, and described as one of Provoost's most personal works by Max Jakob Friedländer in 1931. Friedländer also stated that the work had to have been painted in the early 1500s, which is today commonly accepted. In the 1930s however, much importance was given to the trompe-l'œil inscription on a piece of paper in the lower left corner, bearing the date 1488, so that even subsequently, the painting was thought to be an early Provoost work. Only in 2003 did infrared photography of the painting's surface definitely establish that the inscription is a posterior addition, without information value about the work's inception.

Provoost's Nursing Madonna presents compositional and typological similarities with Simon Marmion's earlier Madonna and Child, now in the National Gallery of Victoria, which had itself been inspired by the depiction of Mary and Baby Jesus in Saint Luke Drawing the Virgin, a hugely influential painting by Van der Weyden. The Strasbourg painting was in turn much repeated and copied by Provoost, his studio, and his followers (at least eleven posterior versions are known).
