= Grabow Altarpiece =

Painting by the Master Bertram

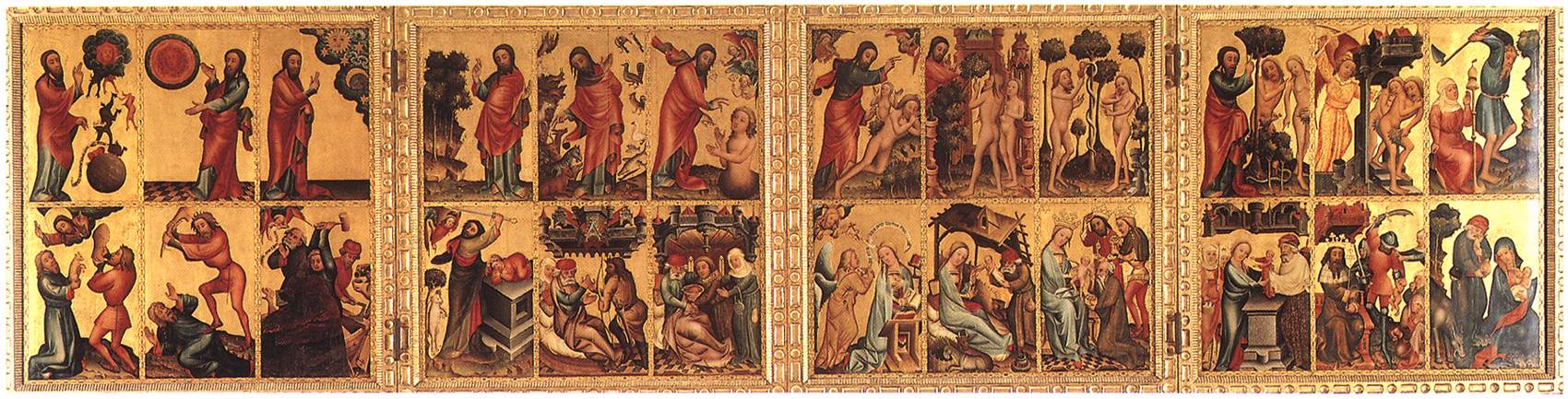
Master Bertram, Grabow Altarpiece, 1379-1383

The Grabow Altarpiece (also known as the Petri Altar) was painted by Master Bertram around 1379–1383. Originally located in St. Petri church, it is now in the Hamburger Kunsthalle in Hamburg, Germany.

It includes the earliest known depiction of the Rest on the Flight into Egypt (lower row, last section on the right).

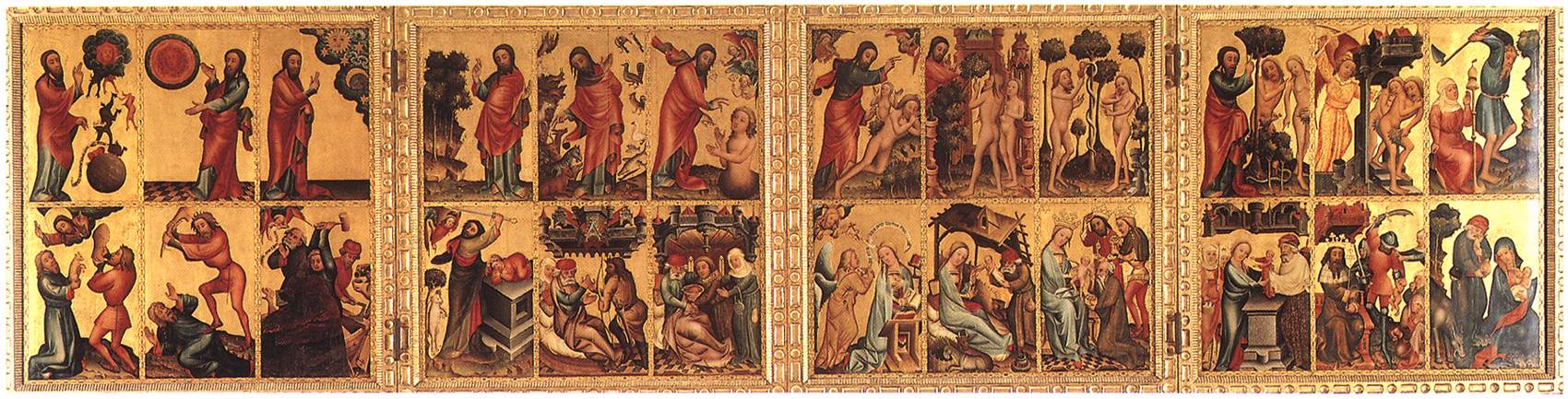
