= Rest on the Flight into Egypt (Mola) =

Painting by Pier Francesco Mola

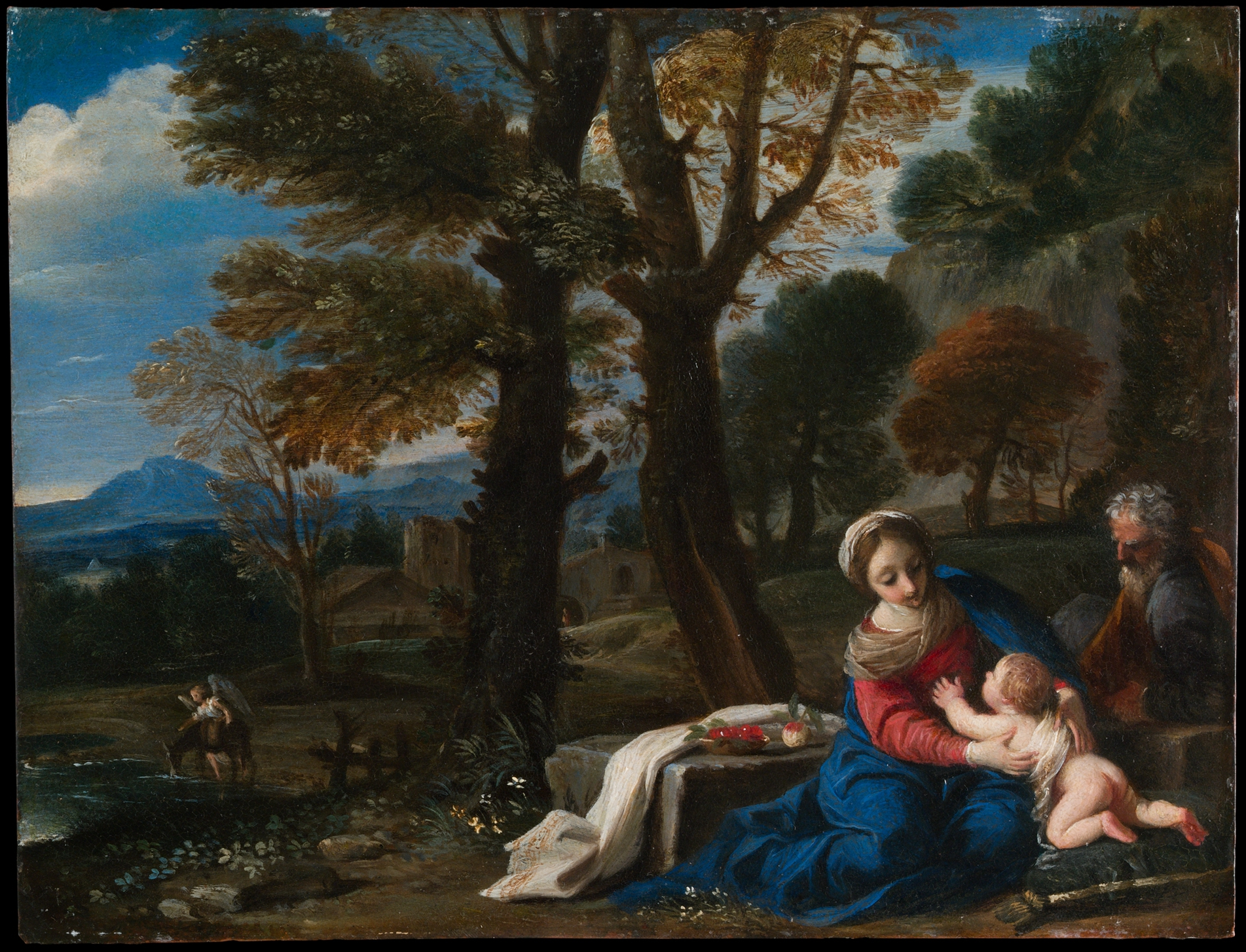
- Artist: Pier Francesco Mola
- Year: probably 1640s
- Type: Oil on copper
- Dimensions: 22.9 cm × 27.9 cm (9.0 in × 11.0 in)
- Location: Metropolitan Museum of Art; New York

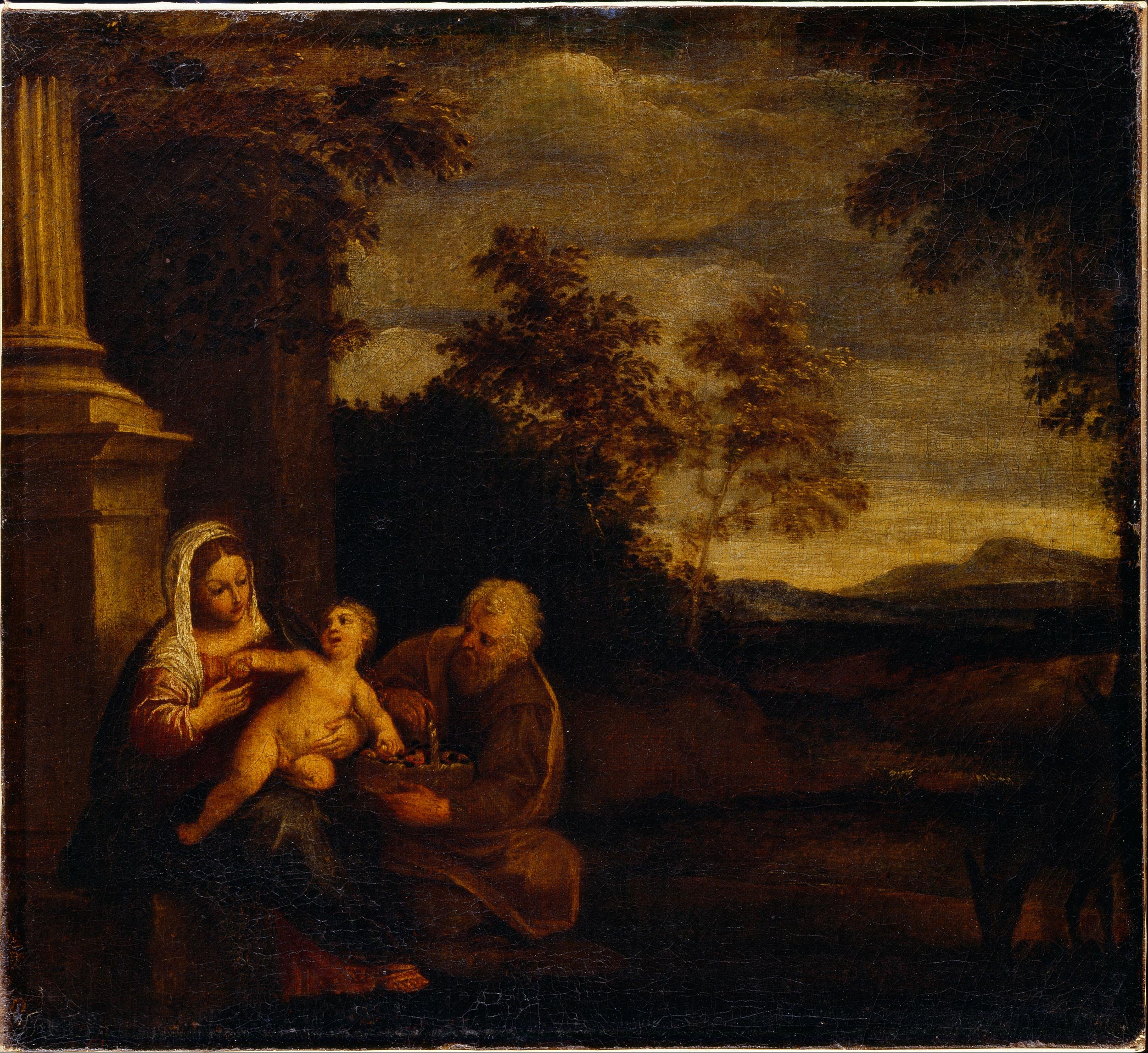
One of Mola's other versions of this subject, Dulwich Picture Gallery, London

The Rest on the Flight into Egypt is an oil painting on copper by the Italian Baroque master Pier Francesco Mola (1612–1666), in the Metropolitan Museum of Art in New York. The Rest on the Flight into Egypt was a popular subject in art, as was the Flight into Egypt itself.

The scene is based not on any incident in the Bible itself, but on a body of tales or legends that had grown up in the early Middle Ages around the Bible story of the Holy Family fleeing into Egypt for refuge on being warned that Herod the Great was seeking to kill the Christ Child. According to the legend, Joseph and Mary stopped on the flight in a grove of trees; the Holy Child ordered the trees to bend down so that Joseph could take fruit from them, and then ordered a spring of water to gush forth from the roots so that his parents could quench their thirst. The basic story took on many extra details during the centuries.

Mola shows the Virgin Mary reaching over to pick up the infant Jesus, with elderly Saint Joseph reclined nearby. The Holy Family enjoys a picnic of fruit. They are surrounded by lush deciduous trees. In the background, an angel leads a donkey to take a drink from the water hole formed by the spring created by Jesus. The ass or donkey is a frequent symbol of the Messiah in Christian iconography.

The exact date of the mid-17th-century painting is not known, but is thought by art historian Richard Cocke to be the earliest of his six paintings dealing with the same theme.

The painting was part of the Wrightsman Fund's 1993 gift to the Metropolitan Museum of Art, and as of January 2011, is on public view.

== References and sources ==
- "The Rest on the Flight into Egypt". Metropolitan Museum of Art.
