= Justus Brinckmann =

German museum director (1843–1915)

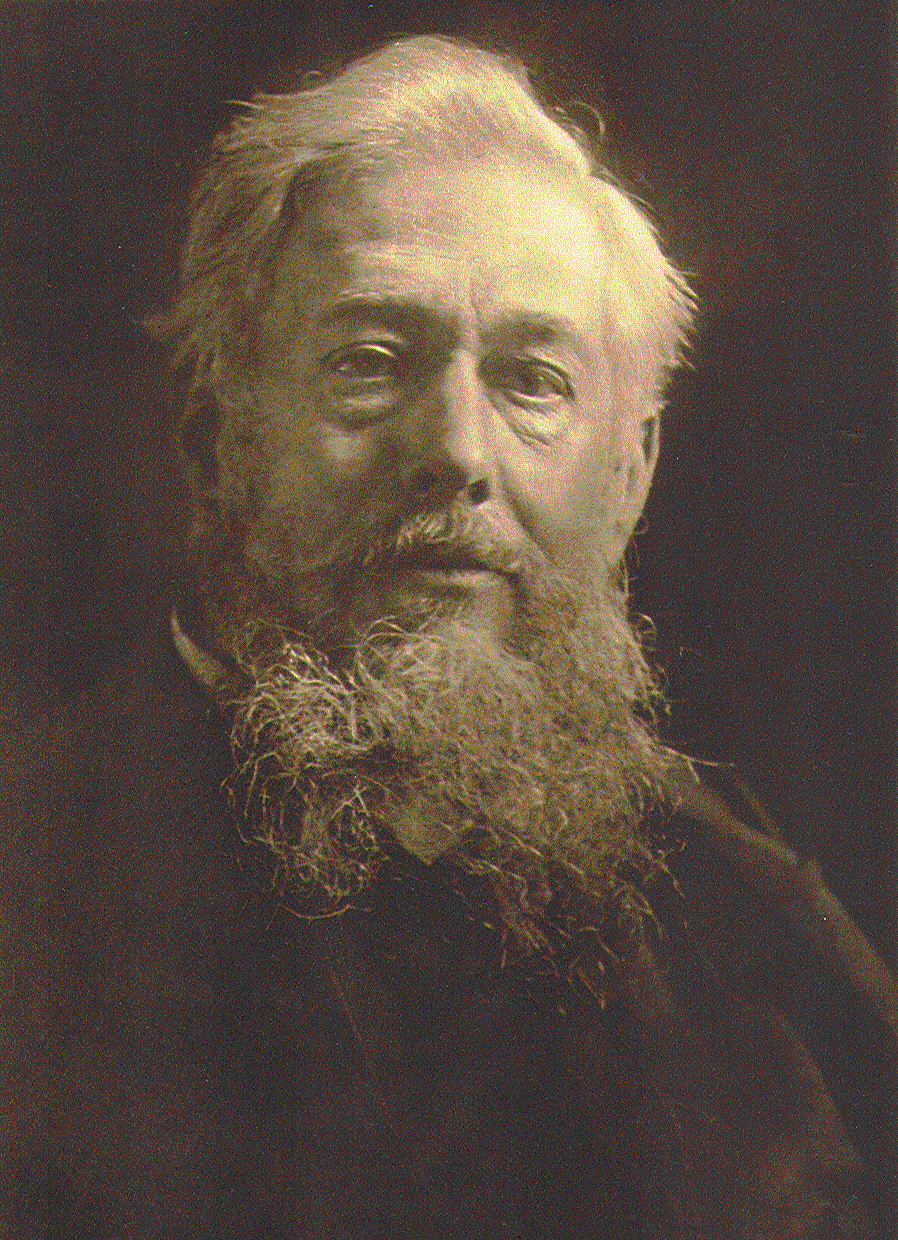
Justus Brinckmann, by Rudolf Dührkoop

Justus Brinckmann (23 May 1843 – 8 February 1915) was the first director of the Museum für Kunst und Gewerbe in Hamburg.

== Selected publications ==
- Kunst und Kunstgewerbe in Japan. 1883 (Vortrag von 1882 im Verein für Kunst und Wissenschaft zu Hamburg)
- Kunst und Handwerk in Japan. Wagner, Berlin 1889 (Neuauflage: BiblioBazaar, 2010, ISBN 978-1-142-22548-3)
- Führer durch das Hamburger Museum für Kunst und Gewerbe. 2 Bände. Verlag des Museums für Kunst und Gewerbe 1894

Band I: Hamburgische Ofen, Korbflechtarbeiten, Gewebe, Stickereien, Spitzen, Lederarbeiten, architektonische Ornamente, ostasiatische Metallarbeiten, europäische Edelschmiedearbeiten, Email, Keramik des Altertums, Deutsches Steinzeug, Fayencen.
Band II: 2 Europäisches Porzellan u. Steingut, westasiatische Fayencen, chinesisches Porzellan, japanische Töpferarbeiten, Glas, Möbel, Bauschreinerarbeiten, Holzschnitzereien, Uhren, Elfenbeinarbeiten, Zinnarbeiten wissenschaftliche Instrumente u.a.

- Kenzan, Beiträge zur Geschichte der japanischen Töpferkunst. In: Jahrbuch der Hamburgischen Wissenschaftlichen Anstalten. XIV. Jahrgang 1896. Lucas Gräfe & Silleni, Hamburg 1897
- Die Ankäufe auf der Weltausstellung Paris. 1900. Hrsg. vom Hamburgischen Museum für Kunst und Gewerbe. Lütcke & Wulff Hamburg 1901
- Hrsg.: Berichte des Museums für Kunst und Gewerbe, 1883–1910. In: Jahrbuch der Hamburgischen Wissenschaftlichen Anstalten
