= Jan Provoost =

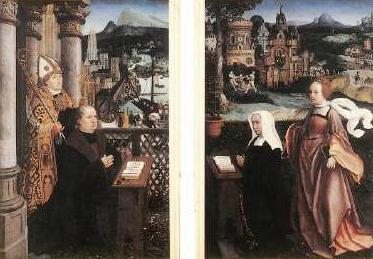
Donor with Saint Nicholas and Wife with Saint Godelina.

Jan Provoost, or Jean Provost, or Jan Provost (1462/65 – January 1529) was a painter born in Mons.

Provost was a prolific master who left his early workshop in Valenciennes to run two workshops, one in Bruges, where he was made a burgher in 1494, the other simultaneously in Antwerp, which was the economic centre of the Low Countries. Provost was also a cartographer, engineer, and architect. He met Albrecht Dürer in Antwerp in 1520, and a Dürer portrait drawing at the National Gallery, London, is conjectured to be of Provost. He married the widow of the miniaturist and painter Simon Marmion, after whose death he inherited the considerable Marmion estate. He died in Bruges, in January 1529.

The styles of Gerard David and Hans Memling can be detected in Provoost's religious paintings. The Last Judgement painted for the Bruges town hall in 1525 is the only painting for which documentary evidence identifies Provost. Surprising discoveries can still be made: in 1971 an unknown and anonymous panoramic Crucifixion from the village church at Koolkerke was identified as Provost's. It is on permanent loan to the Groeningemuseum, Bruges, which has several works of Provost. A retrospective exhibition took place in 2008–2009.

== Selected works ==
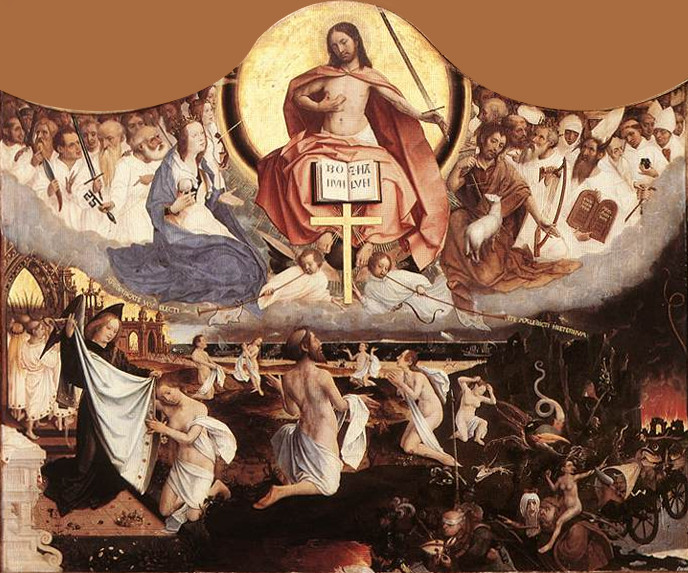
Jan Provoost - Last Judgement, from the Groeningemuseum, Bruges

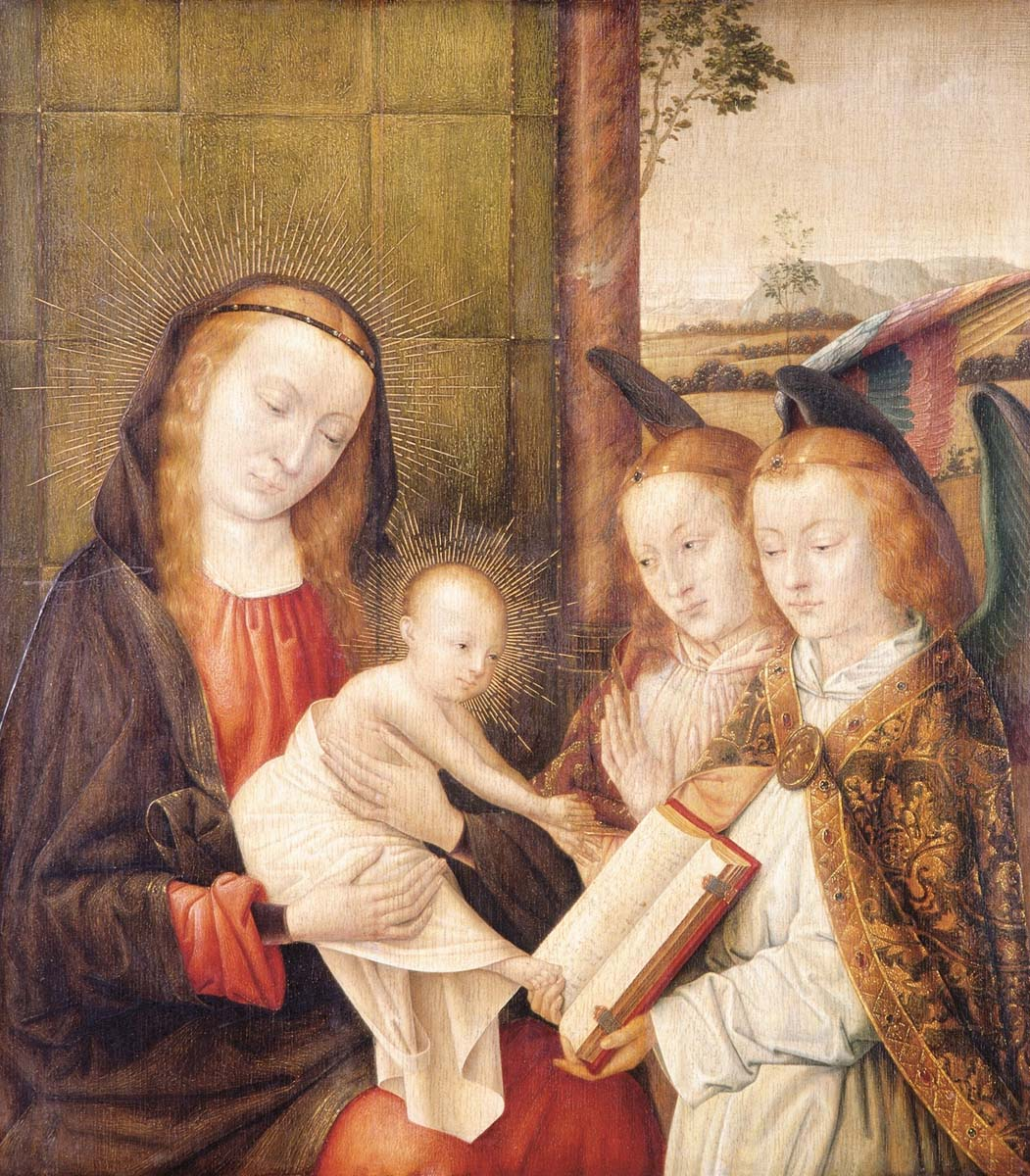
Jan Provoost - Madonna, boy and two angels, from Eva Klabin House Museum, Rio de Janeiro, Brazil

- Crucifixion c. 1495 Metropolitan Museum of Art
- Crucifixion c. 1500 Groeningemuseum, Bruges
- The Virgin in Glory, c. 1524 Hermitage Museum
- The Last Judgment Detroit Institute of Arts
- Nursing Madonna (Madonna Lactans), ca. 1500–1510, Musée des Beaux-Arts, Strasbourg
- Virgin and Child, attributed, National Gallery, London
- Last Judgment for the Bruges town hall, 1525 Groeningemuseum, Bruges
- The Miser and Death, Groeningemuseum, Bruges
- Donor with St Nicholas and his Wife with St Godelina, Groeningemuseum, Bruges
- Carrying of the Cross (diptych with the enigmatic picture on the reverse side), c. 1522 Old St. John's Hospital, Bruges
- Saint John the Baptist and a Canon, Musée des Beaux-Arts, Valenciennes
- Triptych of the Parish Church of Calheta, Museu de Arte Sacra do Funchal
- Saint Mary Magdalene, Museu de Arte Sacra do Funchal
- Nossa Senhora da Misericórdia Triptych, Museu Nacional de Arte Antiga
- The Annunciation, attributed, Queensland Gallery of Modern Art
- Zechariah, Prado Museum, Madrid.
- The Virgin and Child, Prado Museum, Madrid.
- Portrait of a Female Donor, Thyssen-Bornemisza Museum, Madrid.
- Madonna, boy and two angels, Eva Klabin House Museum, Rio de Janeiro, Brazil
