= Master Bertram =

German painter (c.1345–c.1415)

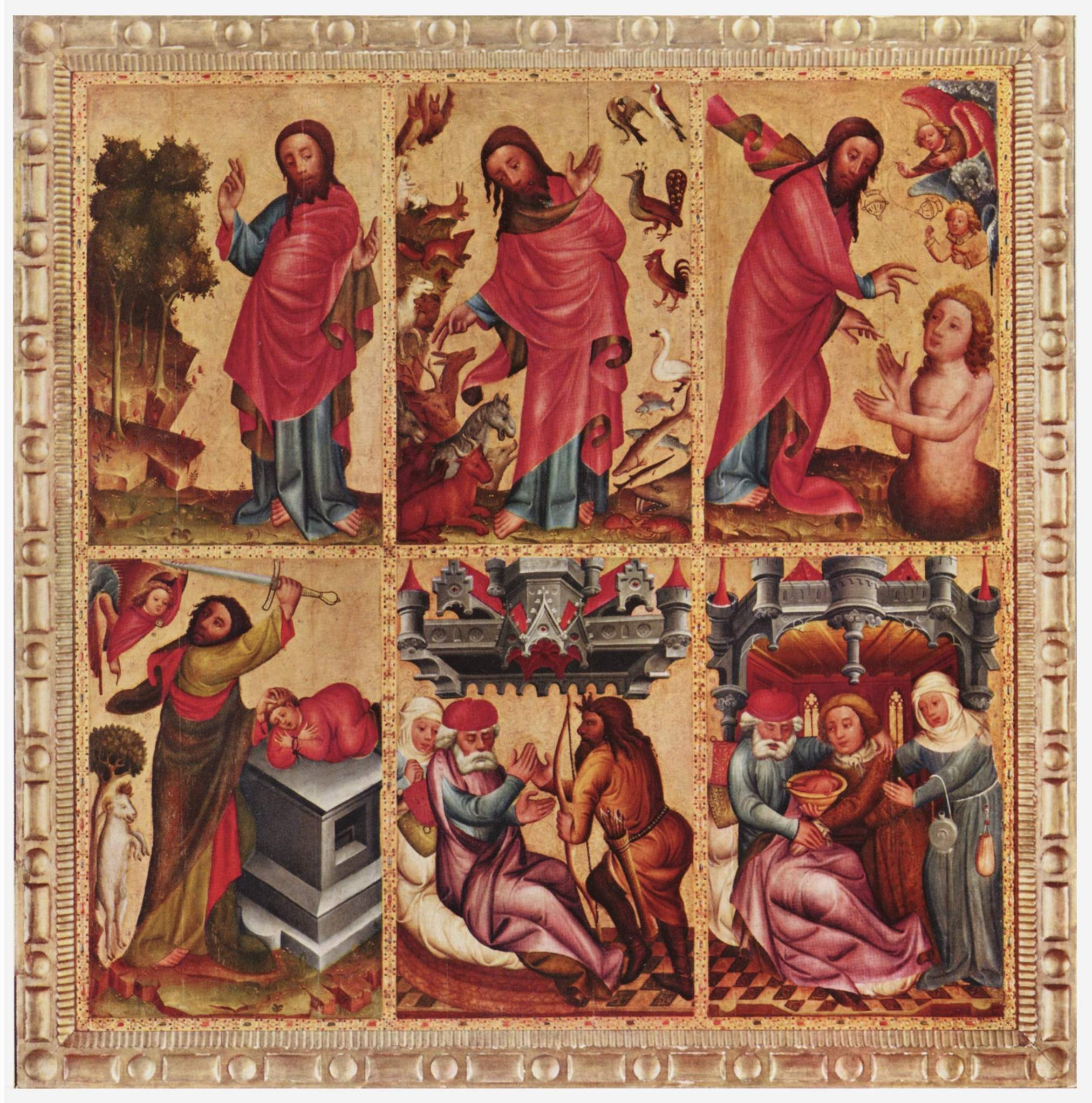
Part of the Grabow Altarpiece

Master Bertram (c.1345–c.1415), also known as Meister Bertram and Master of Minden, was a German International Gothic painter primarily of religious art.

== Life ==
Bertram was born in Minden. He is first recorded in Hamburg in 1367, and lived there for the rest of his life, becoming a citizen and Master in 1376, and achieving considerable prosperity. In 1390 he made a will in advance of an intended pilgrimage to Rome, but if he made the journey it had no detectable influence on his art. He was married, but his wife had died by his second will in 1410, when he had a surviving daughter. He died in Hamburg.

== Works ==
His most famous surviving work is the large Grabow Altarpiece (or Petri-Altar) in the Kunsthalle Hamburg, the largest and most important North German painting of the period. There is a 45-scene altarpiece of the Apocalypse, probably by his workshop, in the Victoria and Albert Museum in London. He, or his workshop, also produced sculpture, presumably in wood; in fact in his first years in Hamburg most surviving documentation relates to sculpture, including chandeliers. A sculpture group depicting Saint Christopher by his hand is located in Falsterbo Church, Sweden.

His style is less emotional than that of his Hamburg near-contemporary Master Francke, but has great charm.

Bertram was largely forgotten after the Renaissance until the end of the 19th century when, like Master Francke, he was rediscovered and published by Alfred Lichtwark, director of the Hamburg Kunsthalle.

== Literature ==
- Dube, Elizabeth Healy: "The Grabow Altar of Master Bertram von Minden", Providence, Brown Univ., Diss., 1982

== Asteroid ==
Asteroid 85320 Bertram, discovered by German astronomer Freimut Börngen in 1995, was named after Master Bertram. The official naming citation was published by the Minor Planet Center on 18 September 2005 (M.P.C. 54829).

== See also ==
- List of German painters
