= Rest on the Flight into Egypt (disambiguation) =

The Rest on the Flight into Egypt is a subject in Christian art, and may refer to:

- Rest on the Flight into Egypt (Algardi) (c. 1640)
- Rest on the Flight into Egypt (Annibale Carracci) (c. 1604)
- Rest on the Flight into Egypt (Barocci) (c. 1573)
- Rest on the Flight into Egypt (Bordone) (c. 1530)
- Rest on the Flight into Egypt (Caravaggio) (c. 1597)
- Rest on the Flight into Egypt (Cima) (1496–1498)
- Rest on the Flight into Egypt (David, Antwerp) (c. 1515)
- Rest on the Flight into Egypt (David, Lisbon) (c. 1501 – c. 1520)
- Rest on the Flight into Egypt (David, Madrid) (c. 1515)
- Rest on the Flight into Egypt (David, New York) (c. 1515)
- Rest on the Flight into Egypt (David, Washington) (c. 1510)
- Rest on the Flight into Egypt (Mola) (c. 1640s)
- Rest on the Flight into Egypt (Murillo) (1665)
- Rest on the Flight into Egypt (Parmigianino), or Nativity (1665)
- Rest on the Flight into Egypt (Patinir) (c. 1515)
- Rest on the Flight into Egypt (Titian) (c. 1512)
- Rest on the Flight into Egypt (van Dyck) (1630)

== See also ==
- Rest on the Flight to Egypt with Saint Francis, by Correggio (c. 1520)
- Flight into Egypt (disambiguation)
- Landscape with the Flight into Egypt (disambiguation)
