= Flight into Egypt (disambiguation) =

The Flight into Egypt is a biblical event described in the Gospel of Matthew.

Flight into Egypt may also refer to:

== Paintings ==
- Flight into Egypt (Titian) (c. 1508–1509)
- The Flight into Egypt (El Greco) (c. 1570)
- The Flight into Egypt (Elsheimer) (c. 1609)
- The Flight into Egypt (Lorrain) (1635)
- The Flight into Egypt (Murillo) (1647–1650)
- The Flight into Egypt (Poussin) (1657/8)
- The Flight into Egypt (Rembrandt) (1627)
- Flight into Egypt (Henry O. Tanner painting, 1899), a series of paintings by Henry Ossawa Tanner

== Music ==
- The Flight into Egypt (Harbison), a 1986 composition by John Harbison

== See also ==
- The Flight into Egypt in a Boat, a 1764–1770 painting by Giovanni Battista Tiepolo
- Landscape with the Flight into Egypt (disambiguation)
- Rest on the Flight into Egypt (disambiguation)
