= The Flight into Egypt (Elsheimer) =

Painting by Adam Elsheimer

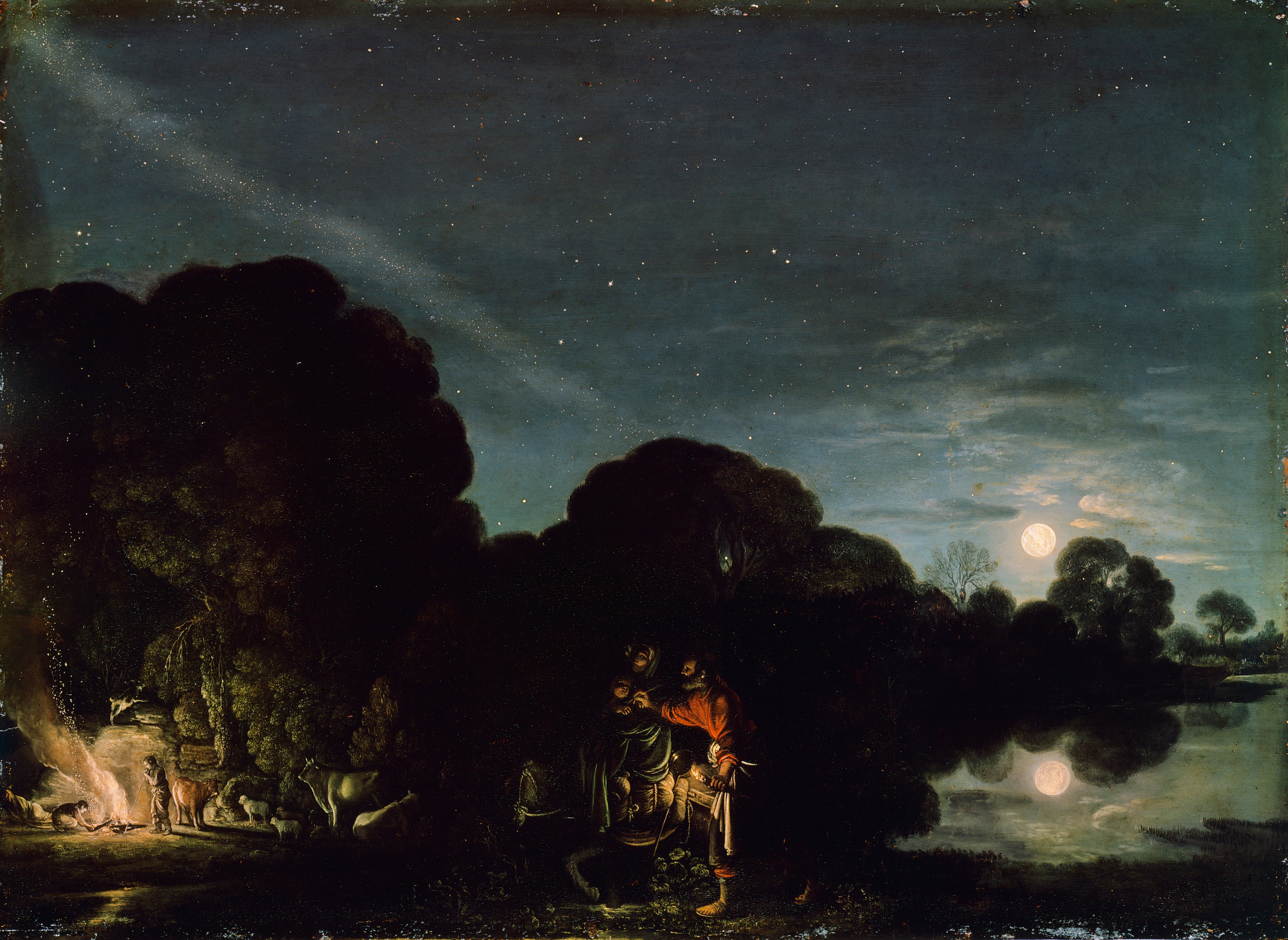
- Artist: Adam Elsheimer
- Year: c. 1609
- Type: Oil on copper
- Dimensions: 31 cm × 41 cm (12 in × 16 in)
- Location: Alte Pinakothek; Munich

The Flight into Egypt is an oil-on-copper cabinet painting by the German artist Adam Elsheimer dating from about 1609, while he was in Rome. It is thought to be the first naturalistic rendering of the night sky in Renaissance art. At Elsheimer's death in Rome in 1610, this picture was hanging in his bedroom. Like many other artists before and after him, Elsheimer has depicted the biblical Flight into Egypt, in which Joseph, Mary, and Jesus seek refuge from possible persecution by Herod. For its innovative fusing of religious and landscape elements, and its detailed juxtaposition of light and darkness, The Flight into Egypt is one of Elsheimer's most well-known and lauded works. It is also likely his last painting, for he died a year later.

Elsheimer's treatment is unique in placing the Holy Family in a nocturnal setting, true to the biblical description. The darkness creates opposing feelings of intimacy and fear of the unknown. The painting channels the mysteries of night, pondered by humans for centuries, into this moment of the Holy Family seeking refuge.

There are four sources of light in the painting: the Moon is accurately depicted and reflects off the calm water. There is a fire near the shepherds at left, where the family is headed. At the centre of the composition, Joseph holds a torch that illuminates Mary and the infant, who are riding an ass. The heavily treed landscape behind them is almost black, its outline forming a diagonal across the sky and completely containing the foreground figures. The diagonal is echoed in the night sky by the intricate band of the Milky Way, and detailed configurations of stars are seen, including Ursa Major at far left. Elsheimer is thought to be the first painter to accurately depict constellations. Another readily identifiable constellation is Leo, above the Holy Family, with its brightest star, Regulus, in the centre of the picture. It has been proposed that Elsheimer reworked the painting in 1610, after the publication of Galileo's Sidereus Nuncius, which showed the Milky Way as composed of individual stars and showed the Moon's surface in unprecedented detail. This hypothesis has been contested by Elsheimer scholar Keith Andrews.

In addition to disclosing Elsheimer's interest in scientific topics, the appearance of the Milky Way has a spiritual connotation—it symbolized the path to heaven beginning in the Middle Ages. Elsheimer's sky, wrote art historian R. H. Wilenski, "is no longer a blackcloth but a symbol for boundless space".

== Influence ==
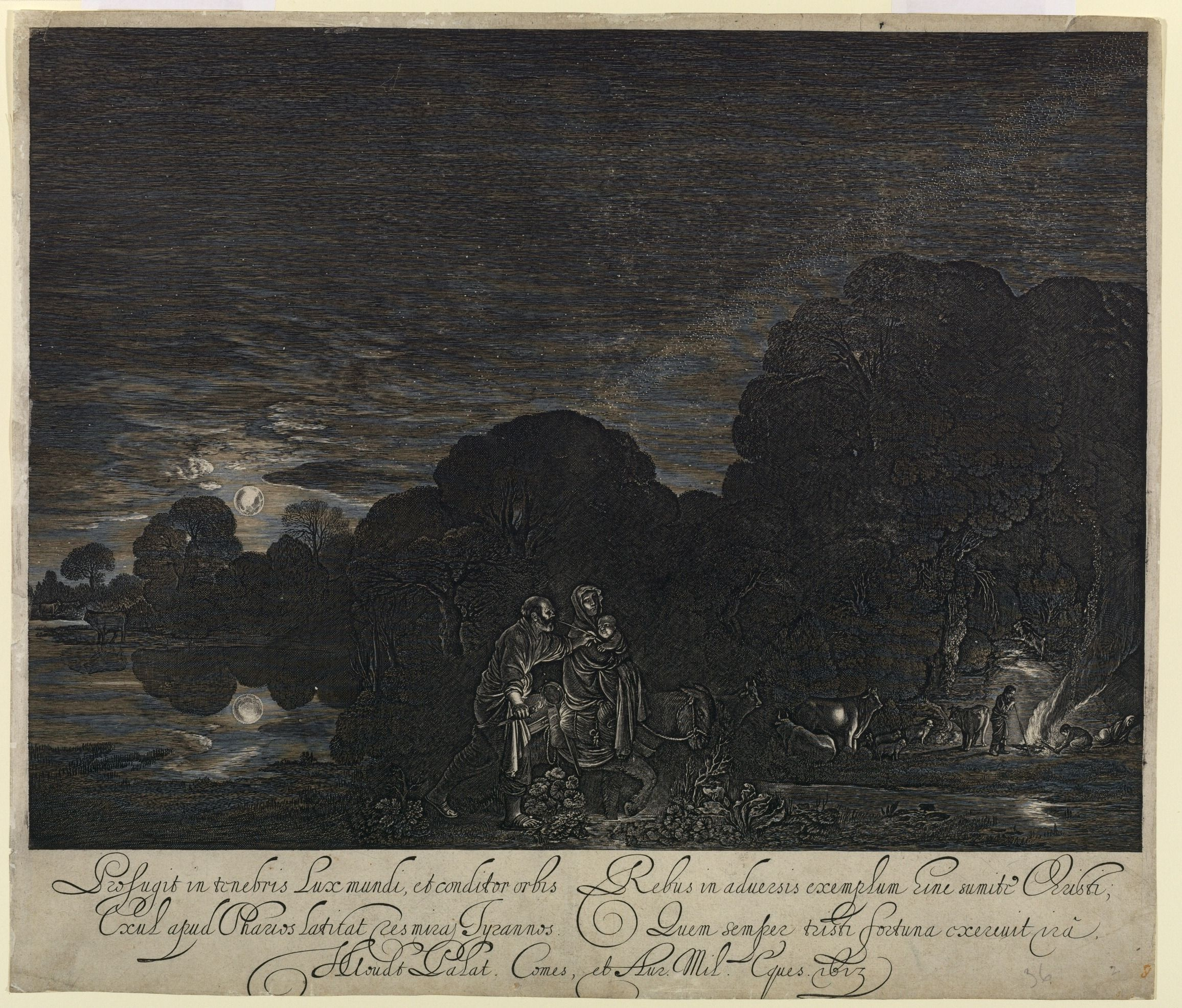
Hendrick Goudt, The Flight into Egypt (1613), engraving, Courtauld Institute

Elsheimer's inventory shows the painting to have been located in his bedroom. The importance of Elsheimer's painting can be judged from a letter dated 14 January 1611 from Rubens to the doctor, botanist and art collector Johann Faber in which he discusses the extraordinary price of 300 scudi demanded by the widow. The painting eventually passed to Hendrick Goudt, who took it to Utrecht.

Elsheimer's works, including The Flight into Egypt, influenced important near-contemporaries Claude Lorrain and Peter Paul Rubens. Rembrandt's version of The Flight into Egypt (1627), with its unique illumination, may have been inspired by Elsheimer's. Rembrandt would have been familiar with Elsheimer's work through high-quality engravings made by his friend Hendrick Goudt. The influence of Goudt's prints on the work of other engravers, especially that of Jan van de Velde, was immediate.

Elsheimer also inspired later artists, such as the German Romantic painter Caspar David Friedrich. The fire's illumination in Friedrich's Evening on the Baltic Sea (1831) recalls The Flight into Egypt.

== See also ==
- Flight into Egypt (disambiguation) for other paintings on this theme
