= Sabine Kalter =

Polish-British mezzo-soprano opera singer

- Born: 28 March 1889; Jarosław, Galicia, Austria-Hungary
- Died: 1 September 1957 (aged 68); London, England, United Kingdom
- Resting place: Hoop Lane Jewish Cemetery, Golders Green, London
- Other names: Sabine Aufrichtig; Sabine Andrews
- Occupations: Opera singer; singing teacher
- Spouse: Max Aufrichtig (m. 1919; died 1950)
- Children: 2, including Keith Andrews

Sabine Kalter (28 March 1889 in Jarosław – 1 September 1957 in London) was a Galician born, Polish-British mezzo-soprano opera singer and singing teacher.

== Early life and education ==
Sabine Kalter was born into a German-speaking Polish-Galician Jewish family in Jarosław, Austria-Hungary (present-day Poland). She grew up in Budapest.

Kalter studied singing at University of Music and Performing Arts Vienna, receiving vocal training from Rosa Papier.

== Career ==
She made her professional opera debut at the Vienna Volksoper in 1911. From 1915–34 she was a leading artist at the Hamburg State Opera. She was married to Max Aufrichtig (1879–1950), a banker in Hamburg. Their son, Keith Andrews (1920–1989), was a leading British museum curator. The family fled Nazi Germany in 1935 and settled in London.

She was committed to the Royal Opera House in London from 1935–39. After 1939 she no longer appeared in operas, but still performed in concerts and recitals in London. She taught singing in London during the 1940s and 1950s.
