= Landscape with the Flight into Egypt =

Landscape with the Flight into Egypt may refer to several landscape paintings that include the biblical Flight into Egypt, including:

- Landscape with the Flight into Egypt (Bruegel), a 1563 painting by Pieter Bruegel the Elder, in the Courtauld Gallery, London
- Landscape with the Flight into Egypt (Carracci), a 1604 painting by Annibale Carracci, in the Galleria Doria Pamphilj, Rome
- Landscape with the Flight into Egypt (Patinir), a 1515 painting by Joachim Patinir, in the Royal Museum of Fine Arts, Antwerp

== See also ==
- Flight into Egypt (disambiguation)
- Rest on the Flight into Egypt (disambiguation)
