= Rest on the Flight into Egypt (David, Antwerp) =

Painting by Gerard David

- Artist: Gerard David
- Year: c.1515
- Medium: oil paint, panel
- Movement: Early Netherlandish painting
- Dimensions: 81 cm (32 in) × 58 cm (23 in)
- Location: Royal Museum of Fine Arts Antwerp
- Accession: 47

The Rest on the Flight into Egypt is an oil painting by the Early Netherlandish painter Gerard David. It was painted around 1515 and is now in the Royal Museum of Fine Arts Antwerp. It can be compared with other works by David which depict the same subject, including paintings located in Madrid, Washington and New York and a Virgin and Child in Rotterdam.

The Flight into Egypt derives from the Gospel of Matthew (II.13-18), though it does not mention a rest, which derives from apocryphal accounts. It was a popular theme for painters in many periods. David painted it on several occasions using different compositions, possibly not as the result of commissions but simply painted to put on the open market. Many of them are near-identical but for a few small details. However, in all of them David focuses attention on the seated Virgin Mary breastfeeding the Christ Child, enthroned in front of a deep forest landscape background. In the far background there is usually a scene related to either the rest or the journey to Egypt.

The Antwerp version replaces the Prado version's background scene of the Flight into Egypt with a scene of Joseph and the donkey resting. It is held by some to be a copy by Adrian Isenbrandt.

== See also ==
- Breastfeeding in art
