= Keith Andrews (art historian) =

British art historian

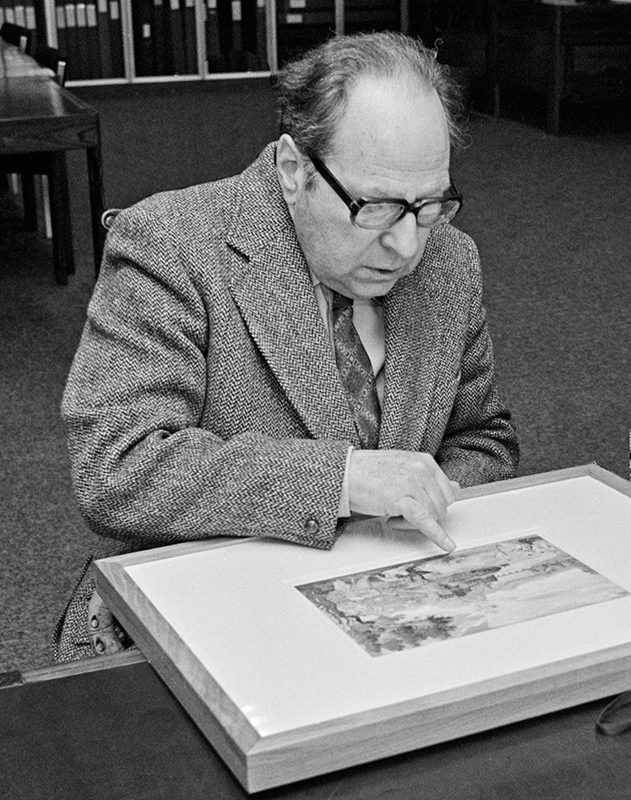
- Born: Kurt Hermann Aufrichtig; 11 October 1920; Hamburg, Weimar Republic
- Died: 4 April 1989 (aged 68); Edinburgh, Scotland, United Kingdom
- Citizenship: British, 1947–1989
- Education: Courtauld Institute
- Occupations: Art historian; museum curator
- Employer: National Gallery of Scotland
- Mother: Sabine Kalter

Keith Andrews FRSE (né Kurt Hermann Aufrichtig;11 October 1920 – 4 April 1989) was a German-born British art historian and museum curator.

== Early life ==
Keith Andrews was born Kurt Hermann Aufrichtig in Hamburg on 11 October 1920, the son of Sabine Kalter (1889–1957) and Max Aufrichtig (1879–1950). His mother, born to a German speaking Polish–Galician Jewish family in Jarosław, Galicia, Austria-Hungary (present-day, Poland), was a leading mezzo-soprano at the Hamburg State Opera. His father, born in Breslau (present-day, Wrocław), was a banker in Hamburg. Andrews had a younger sister Rene Andrews (née Renate Berta Aufrichtig; 1923–1992). The family fled Nazi Germany in January 1935 and settled in London with Andrews becoming a naturalised British citizen in 1947.

== Education ==
Andrews was educated at Quaker School Eerde a school in exil in Eerde, Netherlands. At the age of 17 he contracted Poliomyelitis, which caused permanent muscle weakness in both legs. Returning to London, Andrews attended night school at the Courtauld Institute twice a week, earning his diploma in the early 1950s. During this time he was well known at Warburg Institute, with Gertrud Bing referring to Andrews as "a child of the house".

Andrews was later awarded an Honorary MA from the University of Edinburgh and an Honorary D Litt from University of Glasgow in 1985.

== Career ==
During his studies at the Courtauld, Andrews worked at Ernst Seligmann's antiquarian bookshop 'E Seligmann, Books & Prints' on Cecil Court. In 1955, Andrews was employed as an Art Librarian and Curator at the then Liverpool City Libraries, remaining there until 1958.

In 1958, Andrews joined the Department of Prints and Drawings at the National Gallery of Scotland as 'Keeper of Prints and Drawings'. Andrews' publications on Adam Elsheimer (1578–1610) are of particular importance.

Andrews was elected a Fellow of the Royal Society of Edinburgh in March 1989. On 4 April 1989 Andrews died aged 68 in Edinburgh.

== Selected publications ==
- Andrews, Keith (1964). The Nazarenes: A Brotherhood of German Painters in Rome. Oxford : Clarendon Press.
- Andrews, Keith (1971). Adam Elsheimer : Il contento. Edinburgh : Board of Trustees of the National Gallery of Scotland.
- Andrews, Keith (1972). "The Elsheimer inventory and other documents". The Burlington Magazine. 114 (834): 595–600, 603–607.
- Andrews, Keith (1973). "A Pseudo-Elsheimer Group: Adriaen van Stalbemt as Figure Painter". The Burlington Magazine. 115 (842): 301–307.
- Andrews, Keith (1973). "Elsheimer and Albrecht Dürer : An attempt towards a clarification of Elsheimer's early work". Münchner Jahrbuch der bildenden Kunst. XXIV: 159-174.
- Andrews, Keith (1977). Adam Elsheimer : Paintings, Drawings, Prints. Oxford : Phaidon.
- National Gallery of Scotland; Andrews, Keith (1991). Catalogue of German drawings in the National Gallery of Scotland : with an appendix containing catalogue entries on the drawings by Scandinavian artists. Edinburgh: Trustees of the National Galleries of Scotland.
