= Hendrick Goudt =

Dutch painter

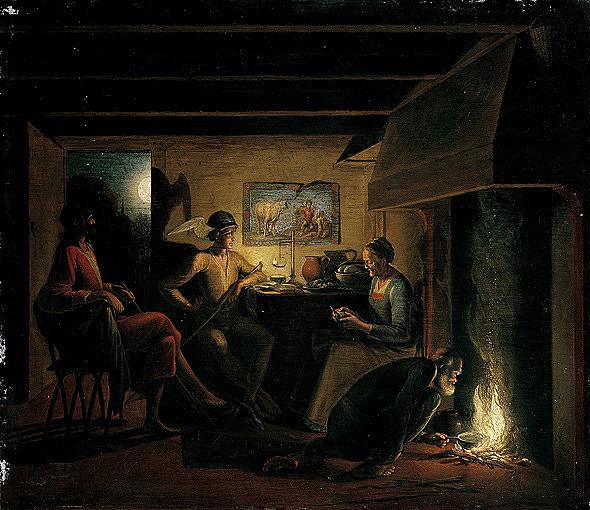
- Philemon and his wife Baucis hospitably entertain Jupiter and Mercury in travellers' guise.
- Born: Hendrick Goudt ca. 1583; The Hague
- Died: 1648 (aged 64–65); Utrecht
- Education: Adam Elsheimer
- Known for: painting printmaking
- Movement: Baroque
- Elected: Utrecht Guild of Saint Luke (1611)

Hendrick Goudt (c. 1583 – 17 December 1648) was a Dutch Golden Age painter, printmaker and draftsman of landscapes and religious subjects who was strongly influenced by Adam Elsheimer.

== Biography ==
Goudt was born in The Hague, the son of Arend Goudt and Anneken Cool. Goudt's grandfather Hendrik came from a family of high officials. He was the nephew and heir of the Willem Goudt, steward of the States of Holland, whose wealth is on display at Noordeinde Palace, which he constructed in 1533. Goudt's mother was the daughter of an inn-keeper in Dortrecht who by all accounts suffered from mental illness characterised at the time as hysteria. Arend Goudt on married Anneken on 10 January 1604 in order to legitimise his son, and continued to live apart from her. Hendrick left for Rome after this.

Hendrick worked with Elsheimer in Rome until the latter's death in 1610. By 1611, Hendrick had returned to Utrecht, where he became a member of the newly founded Utrecht Guild of Saint Luke in that year. Upon his return in the Netherlands, he made a series of five prints of Elsheimer's work (popularizing, for example, Flight into Egypt), and also painted several copies of Elsheimer's paintings, a number of which he had brought to Utrecht.

His father had been ennobled by Henri IV in 1596 (Hendrick himself was titled Ridder, Heere van Noortnieuwlant, van de Keen ende ambachtsheer van de vijff Gorssen). On 12 December 1612, Arend purchased a large property in the Janskerkhof in Utrecht. These are today Janskerkhof 18 and 19.

Houbraken wrote that he was given an aphrodisiac in 1624 by a young lady who wished to marry him, and this addled his brain to the point that until his death he could only discuss art topics coherently. However, Arend Goudt's will of 1625 states that Hendrick had been insane for more than four years, and that a board of trustees had been appointed to look after his affairs.
