= Virgin and Child (Gerard David) =

Painting by Gerard David

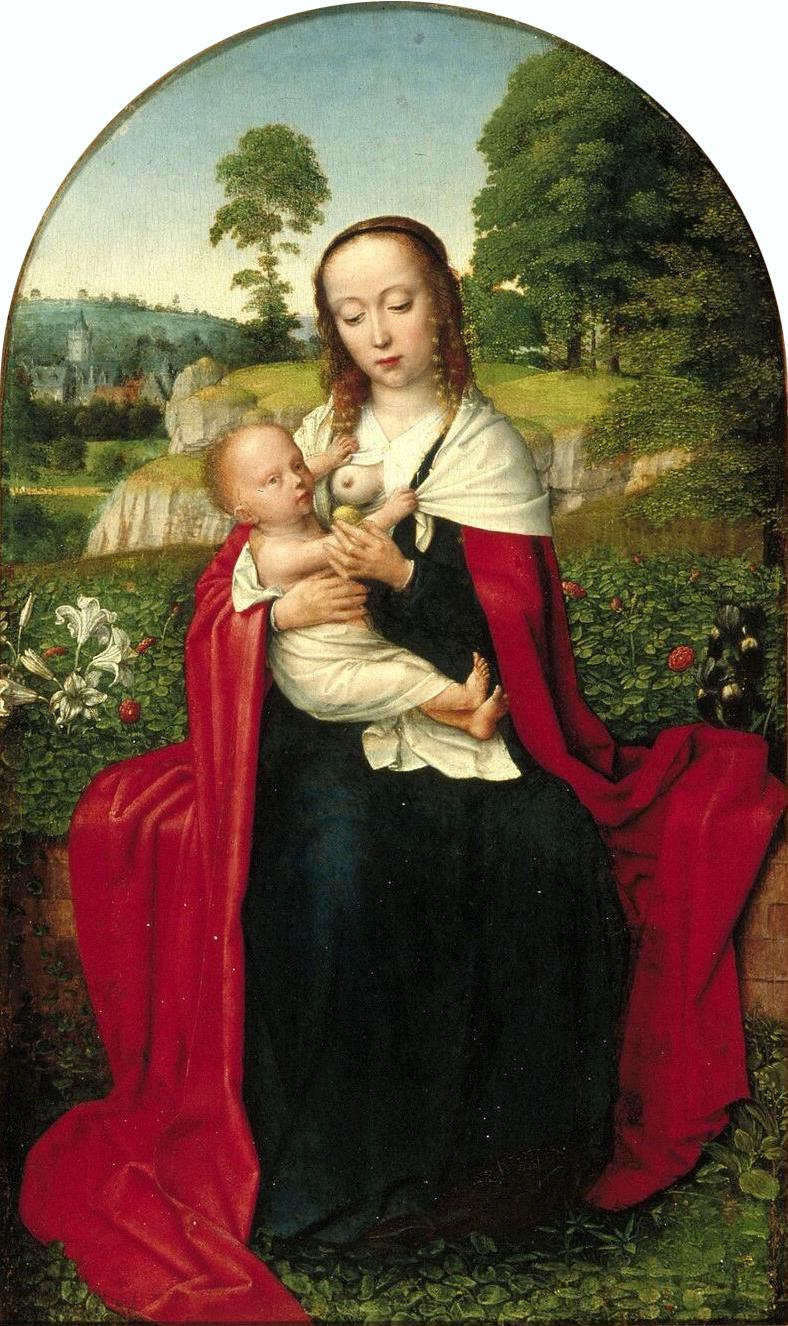
David, Virgin and Child

The Virgin and Child is an oil painting of around 1520 by the Flemish painter Gerard David now in the Museum Boijmans Van Beuningen. It uses a Virgin in the same pose as in works by David now in New York, Washington and Madrid. However, where those three works use the pose to portray the Rest on the Flight into Egypt, the Rotterdam work instead uses the background landscape to represent the "hortus conclusus" or 'closed garden' of the Song of Songs. It also adds white lilies to symbolise Mary's virginity.
