= The Flight into Egypt (Murillo) =

Painting by Bartolomé Esteban Murillo (Detroit)

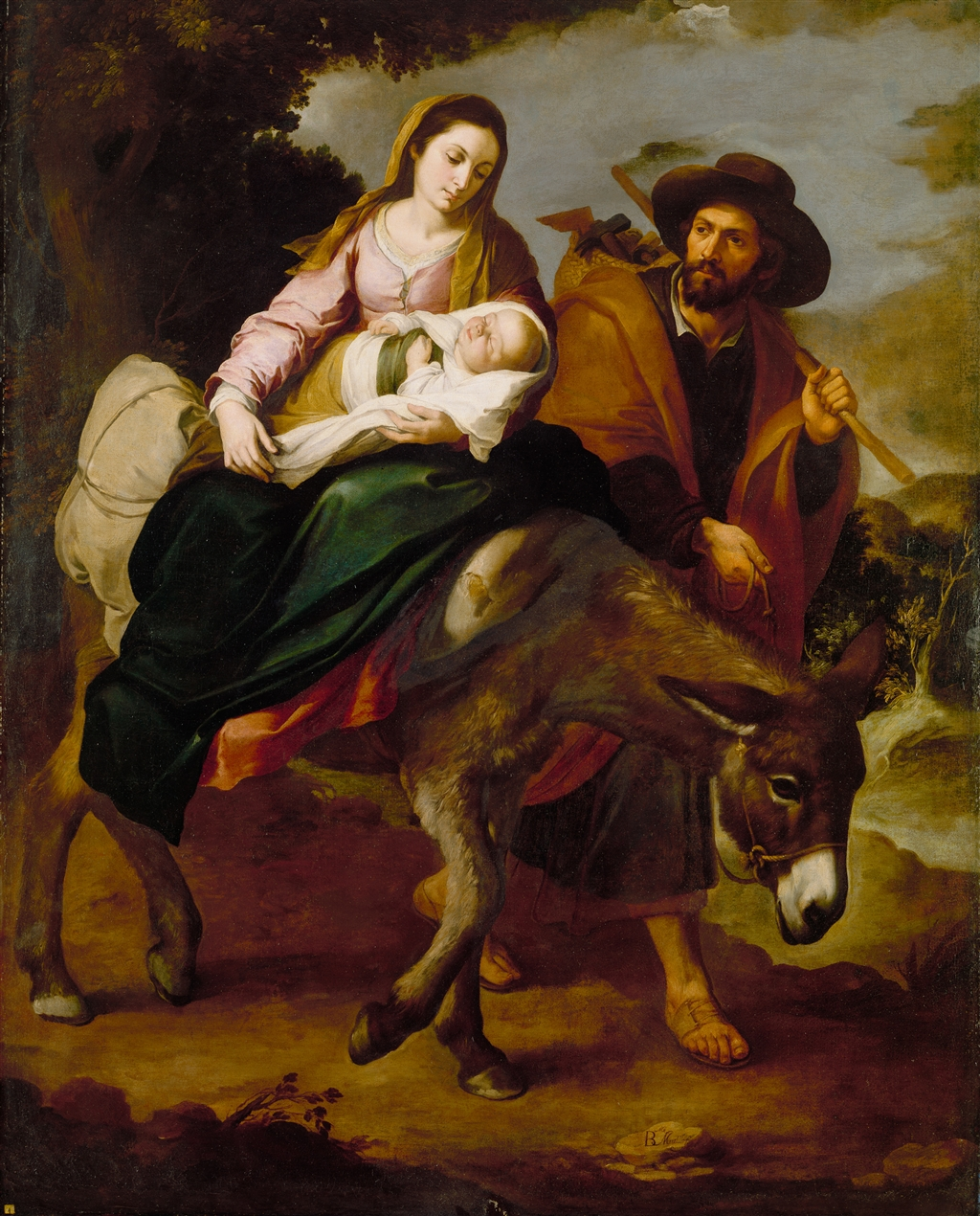
- Artist: Bartolomé Esteban Murillo
- Year: c. 1647-1650
- Medium: Oil on canvas
- Dimensions: 209.6 cm × 166.4 cm (82.5 in × 65.5 in)
- Location: Detroit Institute of Arts, Detroit

The Flight into Egypt is an oil on canvas painting by Spanish artist Bartolomé Esteban Murillo, from c. 1647-1650. It is held at the Detroit Institute of Arts, since 1950.

== Description ==
It shows the flight into Egypt, a popular motif in Christian art from the 14th century onwards. The painting depicts the family fleeing danger for the safety of Egypt along the coastal route known as the "Way of the Sea." The artist’s decision to portray Mary and Joseph in a highly realistic, life-size manner imbues this biblical story with humanity and a sense of urgency. They appear as ordinary parents: Mary gazes watchfully at the sleeping infant in her arms, while Joseph — an ordinary man — wears a worried expression that reflects the natural desire to protect his family. This approach was typical of Murillo. Renowned for his accessible style, he became Seville’s leading artist during the second half of the 17th century.

== Provenace ==
t first appears in the written record whilst in the collection of Sir William Chapman in London, passing through other British collections until its sale at Christie's in London in 1945. It was bought by Maurice Harris, who took it to New York and donated it to its present home later that decade.

== Other versions ==
Diego Angulo's Catálogo crítico lists at least two other treatments of that subject, namely the c.1660 one in the Museum of Fine Arts in Budapest and a 1645-1650 very similar but slightly larger version of the Detroit work now in the Palazzo Bianco in Genoa. The Budapest version adds two small angels hovering over the scene, whilst the main figures of Joseph, Mary and the Christ Child travel in the opposite direction to the Detroit work, while the Genoa version seems to have been painted for La Merced Calzada church in Seville, where it remained until being looted in 1810 by Marshal Soult.

== See also ==
- Rest on the Flight into Egypt (Murillo)
