= Rest on the Flight into Egypt (David, New York) =

Painting by Gerard David

- The Rest on the Flight into Egypt
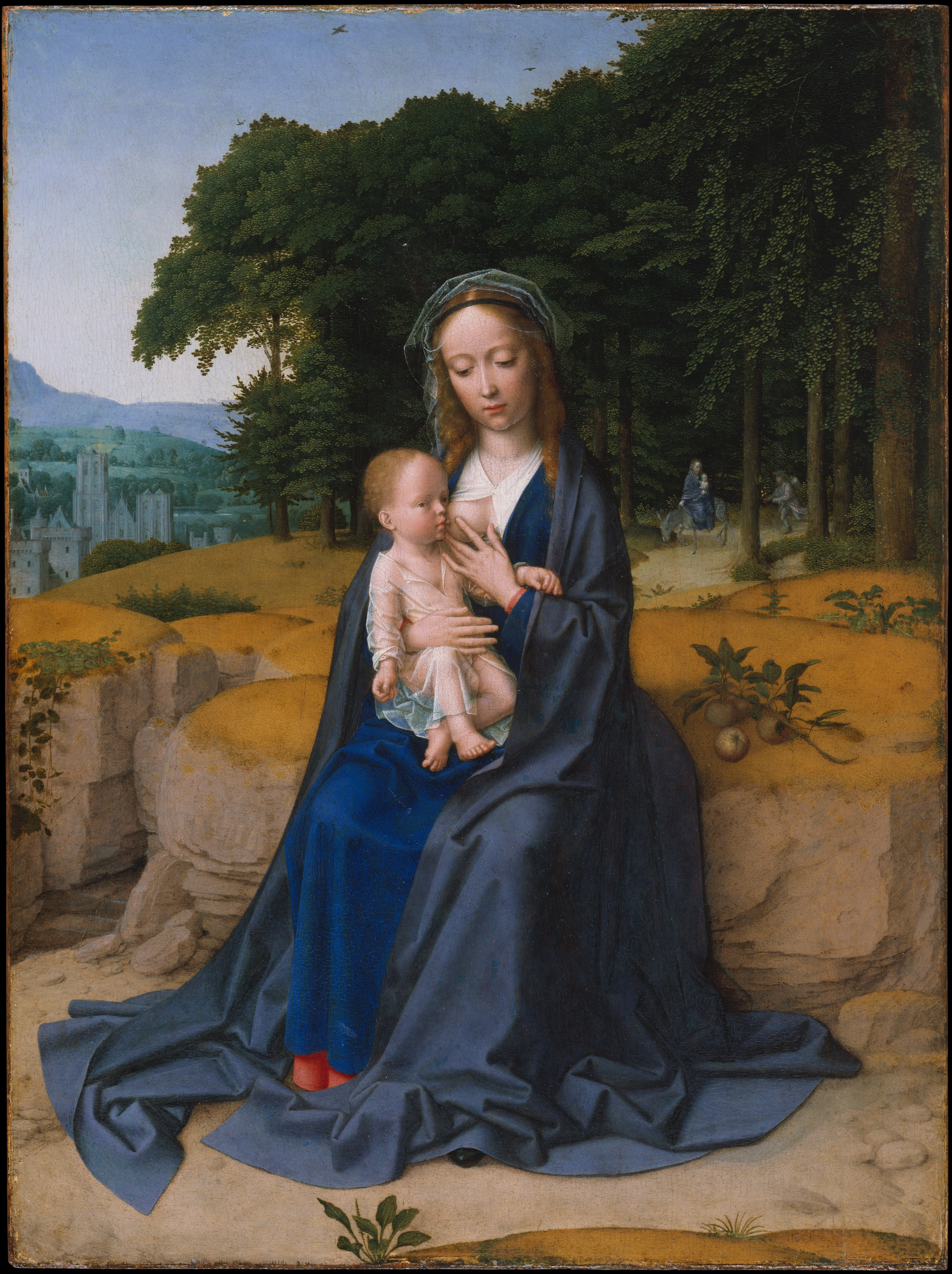
- Artist: Gerard David
- Year: c. 1515
- Medium: Oil paint, panel
- Movement: Early Netherlandish painting
- Dimensions: 50.8 cm (20.0 in) × 43.2 cm (17.0 in)
- Location: Metropolitan Museum of Art
- Accession: 49.7.21

The Rest on the Flight into Egypt is an oil painting of around 1515 by the Flemish painter Gerard David now in the Metropolitan Museum of Art.

== Description ==
It can be compared with other works on the same theme by the same painter in Madrid, Washington, and Antwerp and a Virgin and Child in Rotterdam. The composition is near-identical to the Madrid and Washington examples, though the New York one shows an apple branch instead of a basket.

The Flight into Egypt derives from the Gospel of Matthew (II.13-18), though it does not mention a rest, which derives from apocryphal accounts. It was a popular theme for painters in many periods. David painted it on several occasions using different compositions, possibly not as the result of commissions but simply painted to put on the open market. Many of them are near-identical but for a few small details. However, in all of them David focuses attention on the seated Virgin Mary breastfeeding the Christ Child, enthroned in front of a deep forest landscape background. In the far background there is usually a scene related to either the rest or to the journey to Egypt.

== See also ==
- Breastfeeding in art
