= Rest on the Flight into Egypt (David, Washington) =

Painting by Gerard David

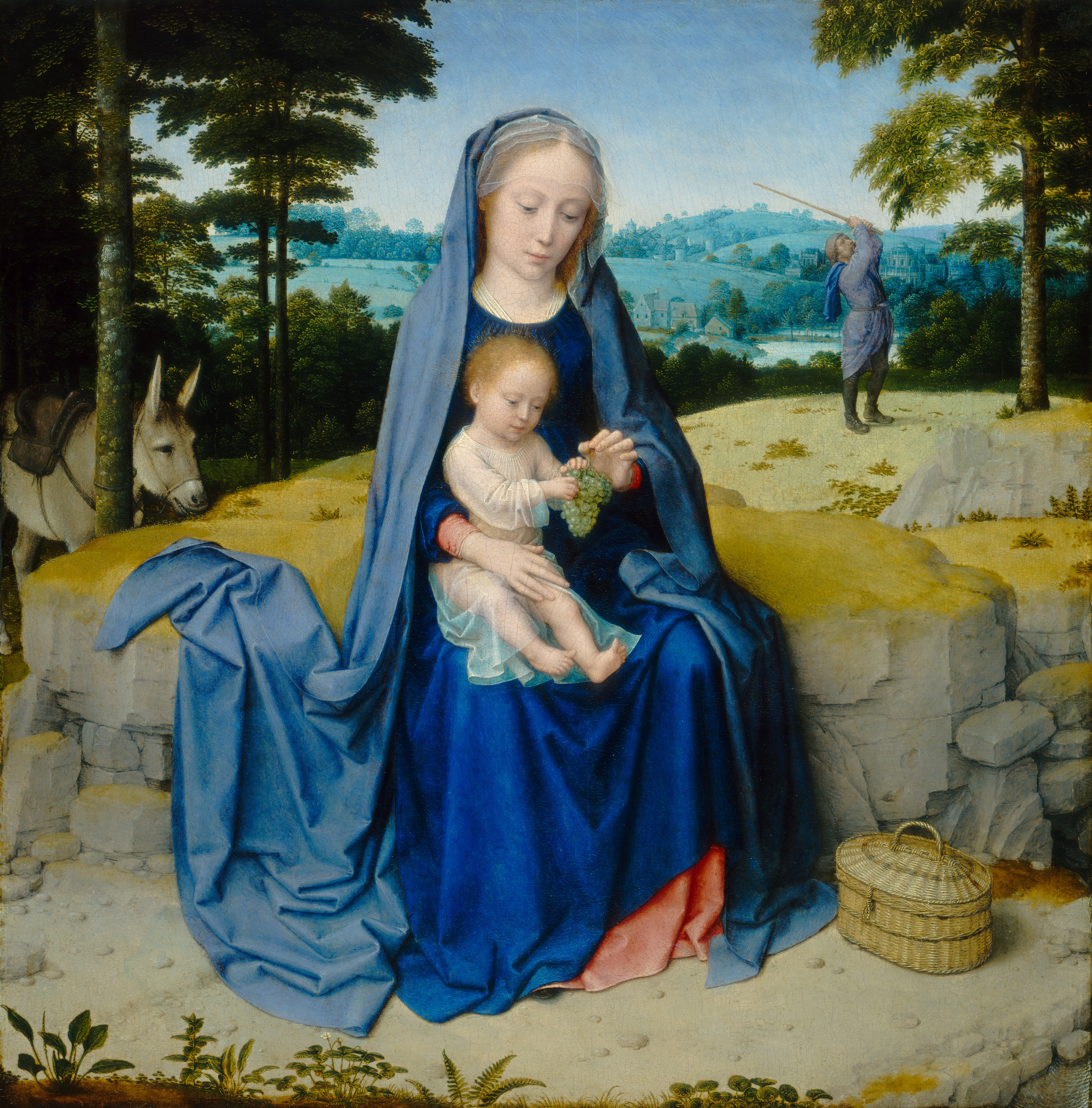
Washington version (c. 1510)

The Rest on the Flight into Egypt is an oil painting of around 1510 by the Flemish painter Gerard David now in the National Gallery of Art in Washington, D.C. It can be compared with other works on the same theme by the same painter in New York, Madrid and Antwerp and a Virgin and Child in Rotterdam.

The Flight into Egypt derives from the Gospel of Matthew (II.13-18), though it does not mention a rest, which derives from apocryphal accounts. It was a popular theme for painters in many periods. David painted it on several occasions using different compositions, possibly not as the result of commissions but simply painted to put on the open market. Many of them are near-identical but for a few small details. However, in all of them David focuses attention on the seated Virgin Mary breastfeeding the Christ Child, enthroned in front of a deep forest landscape background. In the far background there is usually a scene related to either the rest or to the journey to Egypt.

It has an entirely different composition to the Madrid, New York and Antwerp versions and shows the Virgin feeding the Christ Child with a bunch of grapes, a symbol of the Eucharist, and Joseph shaking a chestnut tree to bring down nuts. The bluish landscape is more broadly painted than in the Prado, Metropolitan and Antwerp examples.
