= The Flight into Egypt in a Boat =

Painting by Giovanni Battista Tiepolo

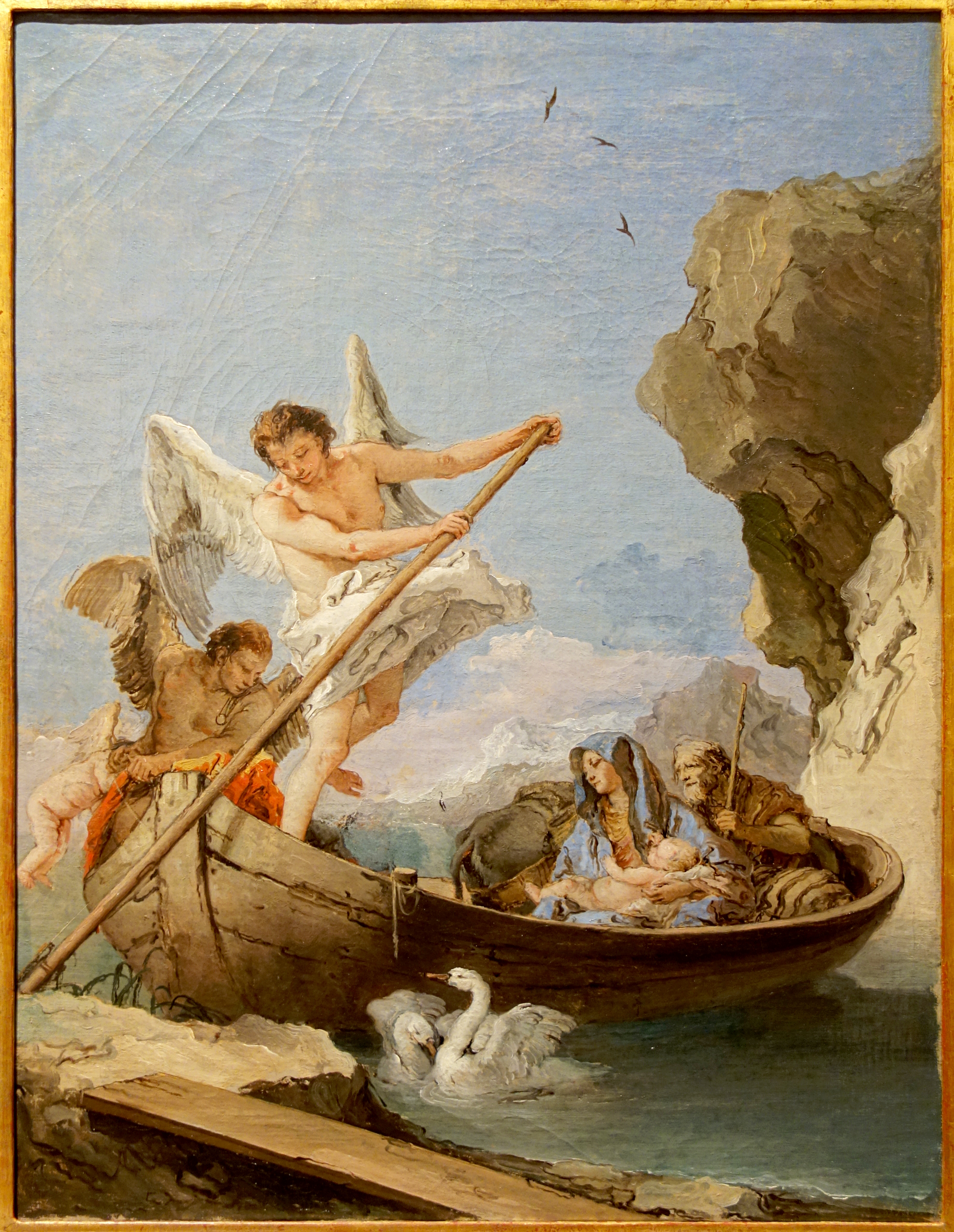
The Flight into Egypt in a Boat (1764–1770)

The Flight into Egypt in a Boat is a 1764–1770 oil on canvas painting by Giovanni Battista Tiepolo, a variation on the Flight into Egypt theme featuring a boat rather than the more usual donkey. The two swans beside the boat are symbols of marital fidelity. It is now at the Museu Nacional de Arte Antiga in Lisbon.

== Description ==
The painting is a variation of the theme of the flight into Egypt made by the Holy Family: here in fact the usual donkey does not appear but in its place there is a boat, on which are Joseph, Mary and Jesus. The boat is guided with touches delicate by three angels, who are preparing to land on the Egyptian coasts. In the water we see two swans which are the allegory of marital fidelity.

== Exhibitions ==
This painting was shown to the public in Paris, at the Dazzling Venice! Venice, the arts and Europe in the 18th century at the Grand Palais, from September 26, 2018 to January 21, 2019.
