= Rest on the Flight into Egypt (David, Madrid) =

Painting by Gerard David

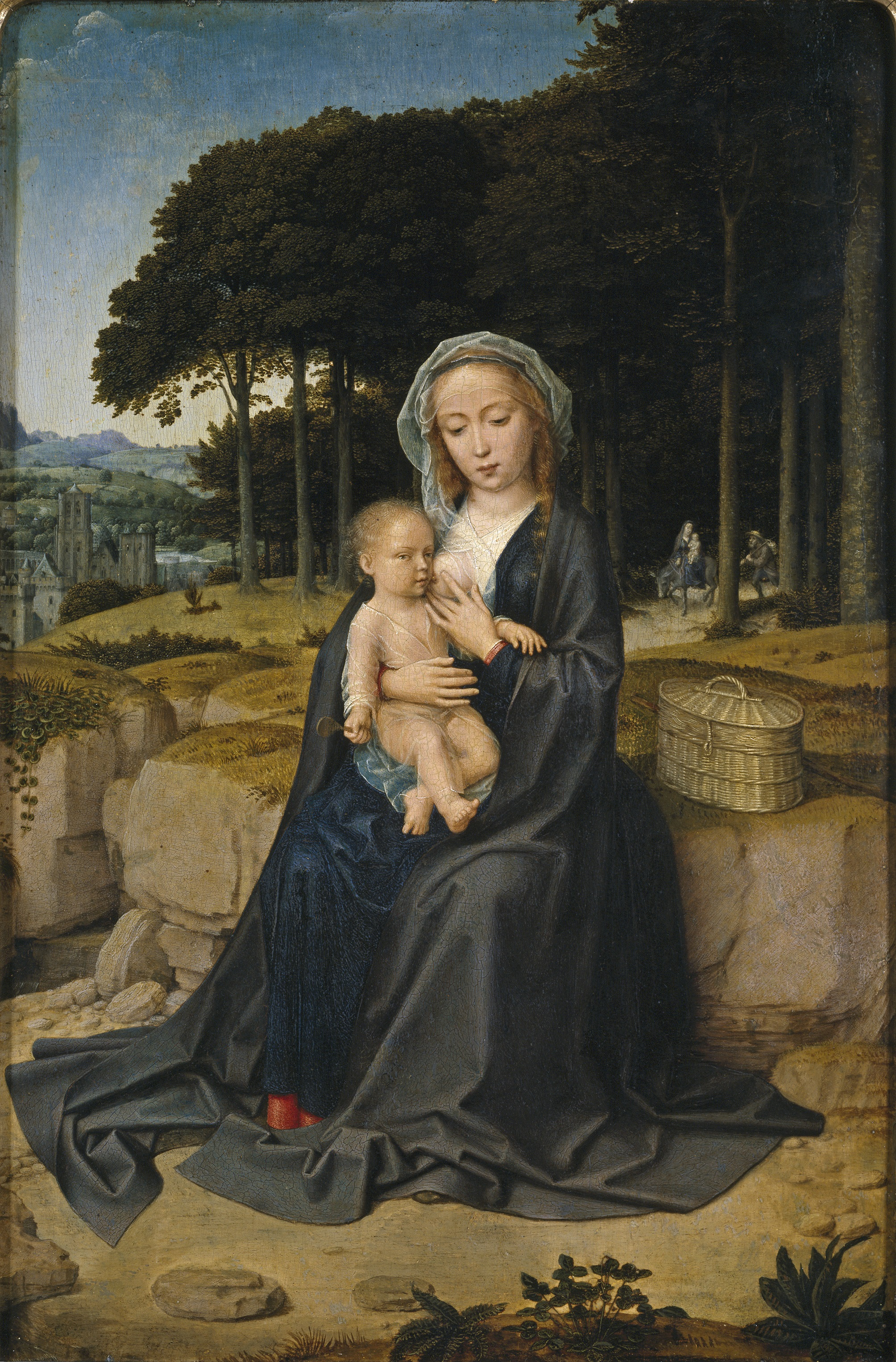
- Artist: Gerard David
- Year: c. 1515
- Medium: Oil on panel
- Movement: Gothic
- Dimensions: 60 cm × 39 cm (24 in × 15 in)
- Location: Museo del Prado, Madrid

The Rest on the Flight into Egypt is an oil painting of around 1515 by the Flemish painter Gerard David now in the Prado Museum. It can be compared with other works on the same theme by the same painter in New York, Washington and Antwerp and a Virgin and Child in Rotterdam.

The Flight into Egypt derives from the Gospel of Matthew (II.13-18), though it does not mention a rest, which derives from apocryphal accounts. It was a popular theme for painters in many periods. David painted it on several occasions using different compositions, possibly not as the result of commissions but simply painted to put on the open market. Many of them are near-identical but for a few small details. However, in all of them David focuses attention on the seated Virgin Mary breastfeeding the Christ Child, enthroned in front of a deep forest landscape background. In the far background there is usually a scene related to either the rest or to the journey to Egypt.

It entered the Museum in 1915 from a convent in Navarre. It was then attributed to Hieronymus Bosch. It shows the Virgin and Child in the traditional Virgo Lactans composition, with the Holy Family's flight into Egypt shown in the forest in the left background. Behind the trees on the right is a city by a river and hills reaching to the horizon. The Flemish taste for detail is shown in the plants in the foreground, the food basket and the leaves of the beech and chestnut trees. The chiaroscuro shapes the figure of Mary and the tones (especially the blues and greens) are graded so as to give depth to the landscape.
