= Rest on the Flight into Egypt (David, Lisbon) =

Painting by Gerard David

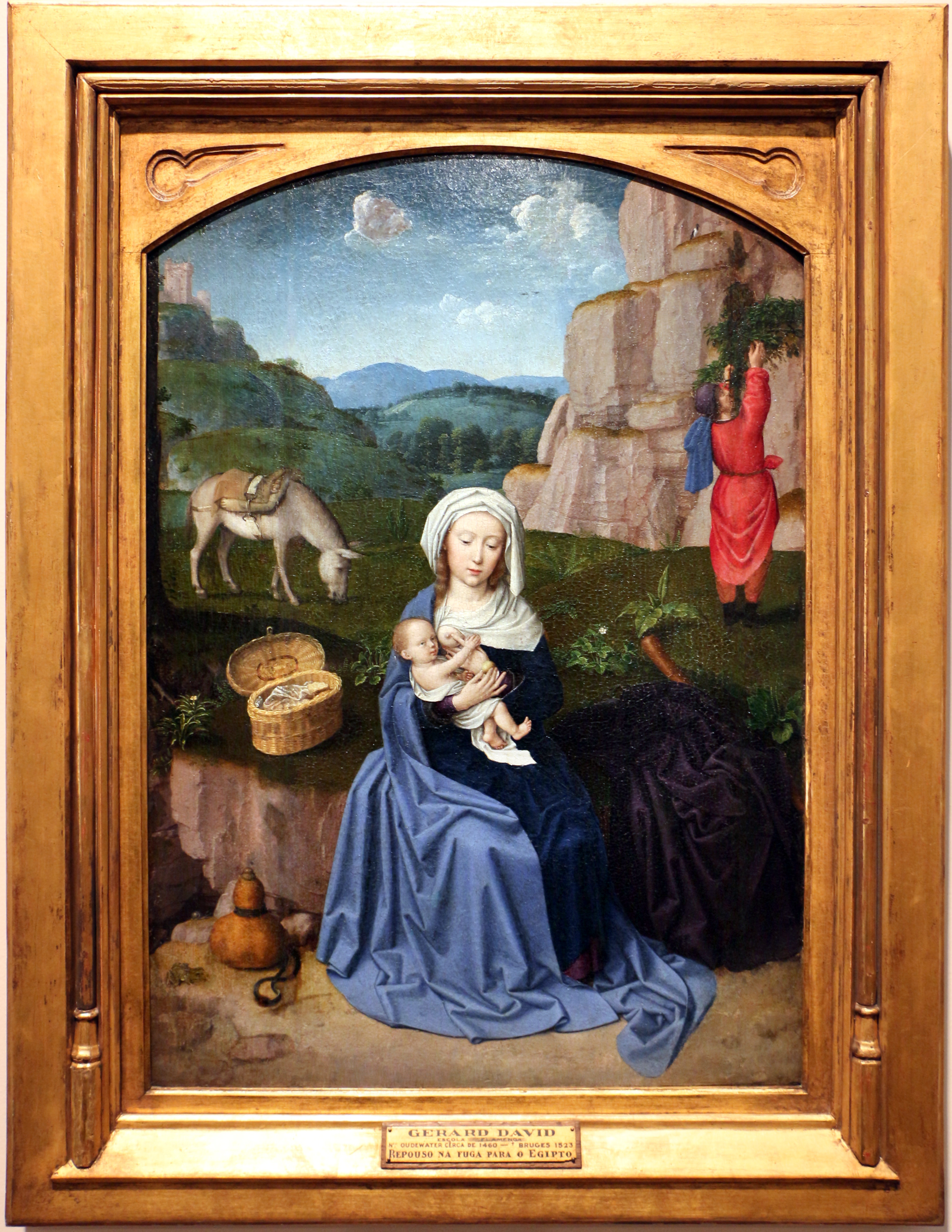
Rest on the Flight into Egypt (c. 1501–1520) by Gerard David

Rest on the Flight into Egypt is an oil-on-panel painting executed ca. 1501–1520 by the Early Netherlandish painter Gerard David. It was probably originally commissioned for the Convent of Our Lady of Paradise in Évora and is now in the National Museum of Ancient Art in Lisbon.
