= Rest on the Flight into Egypt (Murillo) =

Painting by Bartolomé Esteban Murillo

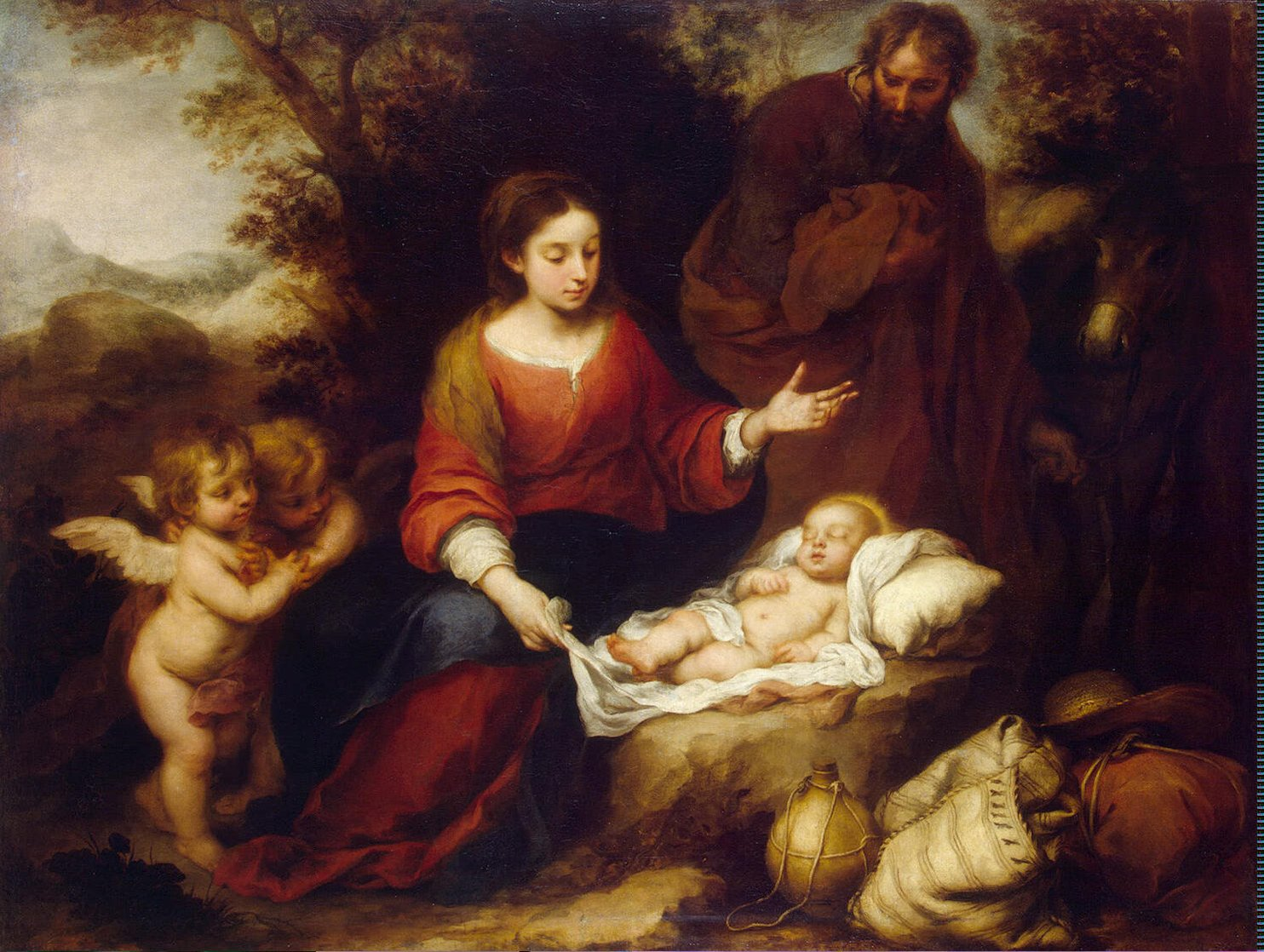
- Artist: Bartolomé Esteban Murillo
- Year: c. 1665
- Type: Oil on canvas
- Dimensions: 136.5 cm × 179.5 cm (53.7 in × 70.7 in)
- Location: Hermitage Museum, Saint Petersburg

Rest on the Flight into Egypt is an oil on canvas painting executed c.1665 by the Spanish artist Bartolomé Esteban Murillo which is now in the Hermitage Museum, St Petersburg, Russia. It depicts the Holy Family, attended by two Cupids, resting during a flight to safety. The theme was a popular one which was painted by several artists.

The Bible relates that, after Joseph had been warned by an angel that King Herod was planning to kill all the firstborn children in Judea to protect himself from the threat posed by the newborn "King of the Jews", he followed the angel's instructions to flee with his family to Roman-occupied Egypt. They would return some years later on hearing of Herod's death, resettling for safety in the town of Nazareth in the north of Israel.

== See also ==
- Rest on the Flight into Egypt
- The Flight into Egypt (Murillo)
- 100 Great Paintings, 1980 BBC series
