= Portrait of Stéphane Mallarmé =

Painting by Édouard Manet

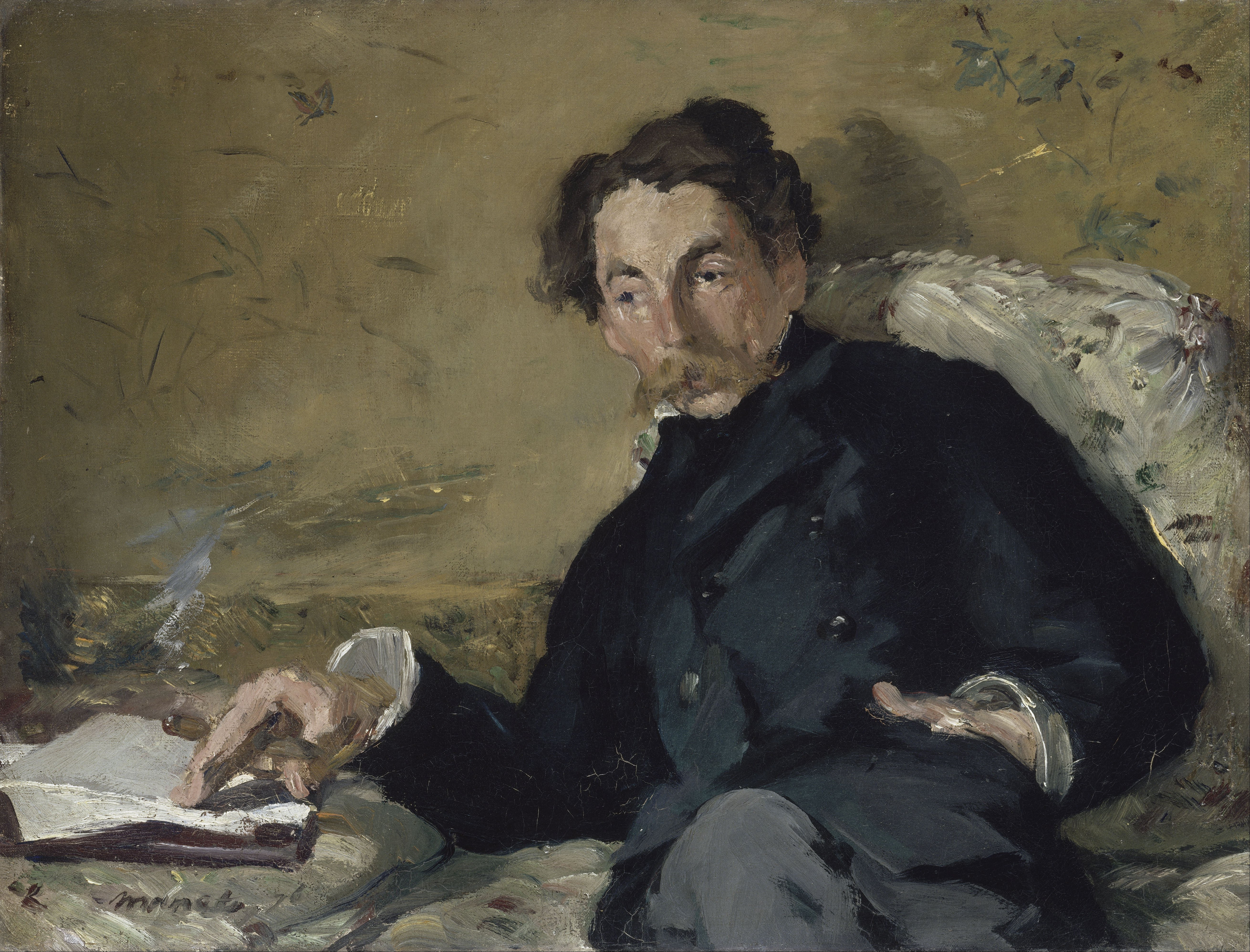
- Artist: Édouard Manet
- Year: 1876
- Medium: Oil on canvas
- Dimensions: 27.2 cm × 35.7 cm (10.7 in × 14.1 in)
- Location: Musée d'Orsay, Paris

Portrait of Stéphane Mallarmé is an 1876 oil on canvas painting by the French, modernist painter, Édouard Manet. The painting is a portrait of the French poet Stéphane Mallarmé, who was a friend and colleague of Manet's. Manet and Mallarmé met in 1873 and developed a strong bond, seeing each other almost daily until Manet's death in 1883. Mallarmé enlisted Manet's help in illustrating his own poems and his translation of Edgar Allan Poe's tale The Raven. This familiarity between artist and subject might explain why contemporaries considered Manet’s painting of Mallarmé to be an accurate depiction of the poet.

The painting depicts Mallarmé resting casually on a couch, holding a cigar, appearing to be in deep contemplation. Some art historians draw similarities between Manet’s portrait of Mallarmé and his illustrations for Mallarmé’s translation of The Raven.

The painting was acquired from Mallarmé's family by the Louvre Museum in 1928, and it was later transferred to its present location in the Musée d'Orsay in Paris.

== Composition and analysis ==
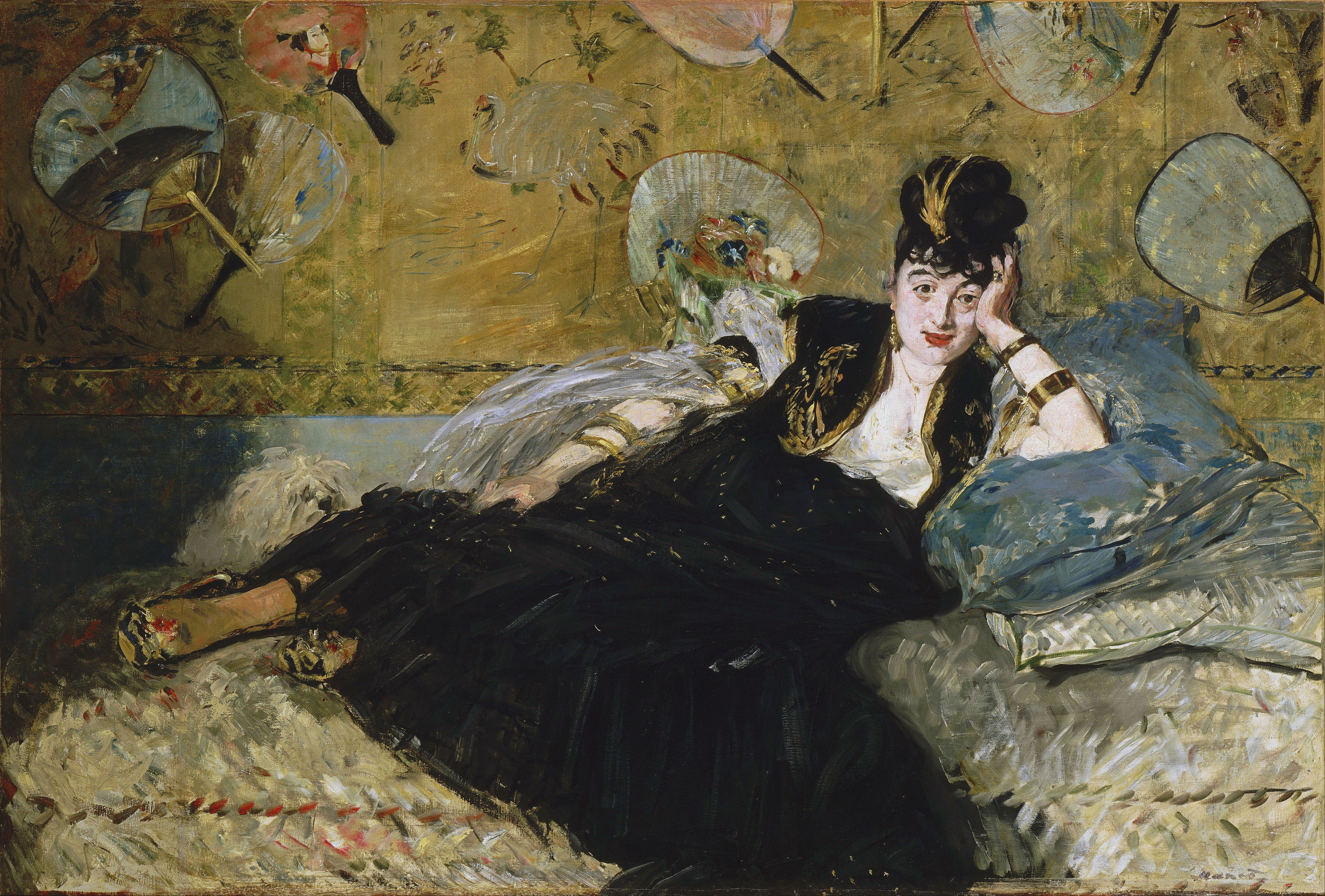
The Lady with Fans: Portrait of Nina de Callias (1874) by Édouard Manet

In the portrait, Mallarmé is depicted leaning back against the white cushions of a couch, holding a cigar, and appearing to be in deep contemplation. Art historians have speculated that the couch the subject rests on could be the couch in Manet’s rue de Saint-Pétersbourg studio. Mallarmé appears in front of light beige wallpaper that is decorated with what some critics believe to be butterflies and flowers. Some scholars consider the floral decorations on the wallpaper to be Japanese motifs similar to the Japanese motifs that appear in other works of Manet's such as: The Lady with Fans: Portrait of Nina de Callias and Nana .

In the portrait, Mallarmé’s arm rests on a bundle of paper. Art historians believe the stack of papers could be an allusion to the article he had recently published defending Manet and the Impressionists, or to another piece of writing such as the translation of The Raven, which artist and subject worked on together.

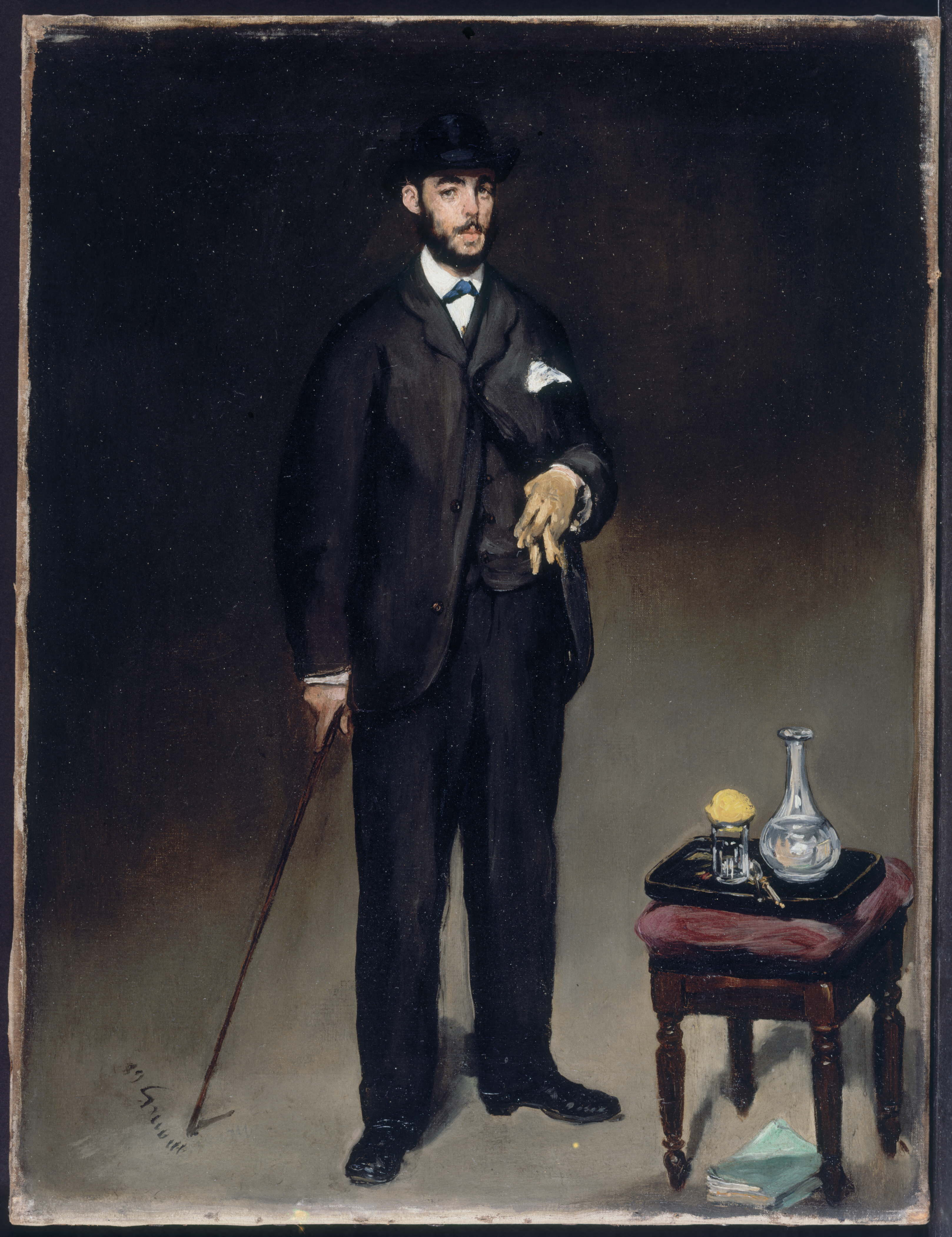
Edouard Manet, Portrait of Théodore Duret, 1868

The art historian Anne Coffin Hanson believes that Manet contrasted the smoke rising from Mallarmé’s cigar with the delicate-looking Japanese designs on the wallpaper. She argues that this contrast generates an atmosphere within the painting that blends sensuality and reflectivity. Hanson compares Manet's paint application in the Portrait of Stéphane Mallarmé to his paint application in his portrait of Duret. She observes that in Manet's portrait of Mallarmé, he applied the paint with a "virtuoso freeness." Further, she contrasts Duret’s stiff stance in his portrait with Mallarmé’s relaxed, seated position, asserting that his position makes the portrait seem spontaneous, informal, and pointedly modern.

== Background: Manet and Mallarmé ==
Georges Bataille, a friend of both Manet and Mallarmé, remarked that the portrait "radiates the friendship of two great minds." Mallarmé made the acquaintance of Manet in 1873, upon his arrival in Paris. Mallarmé quickly established a name for himself in Parisian society through his association with a network of influential and notable figures. Mallarmé hosted Tuesday gatherings at his apartment on the rue de Rome and invited well-known artists including Debussy, Rodin, Whistler, Renoir, and Manet. Mallarmé taught English at the Lycée Fontane (currently the Lycée Condorect) and would stop almost daily for a chat in the late afternoon with Manet and his circle of friends on his way home from work.

Mallarmé and Manet collaborated on work frequently. Manet created wood-engraved illustrations for Mallarmé's poem "Afternoon of a Faun" (L’Après-midi d’un faune), which inspired Debussy's symphonic poem of the same title. Critics have noted that the dreaminess of Manet's Portrait of Stéphane Mallarmé is reminiscent of his illustrations for "Afternoon of a Faun." Their most notable collaboration involved Mallarmé’s translation of Edgar Allan Poe’s The Raven, for which Manet provided illustrations.

Mallarmé also played a major role in defending Manet's art. Mallarmé wrote an article "Le Jury de Peinture pour 1874 et M. Manet" in the artist's defense in 1874. Further, Mallarmé wrote an essay entitled, “The Impressionists and Edouard Manet,” for publication in a London magazine in 1876. The art historian Carol Armstrong has suggested that Mallarmé "seal[ed] Manet’s reputation as the founder of Impressionism" through this essay.

During the last years of Manet's life, the friends met nearly daily, and Manet's death caused Mallarmé profound sadness. In a letter to a fellow French poet Paul-Marie Verlaine, Mallarmé wrote: "I saw my dear Manet every day for ten years, and I find his absence today incredible."

== Collaboration: The Raven ==
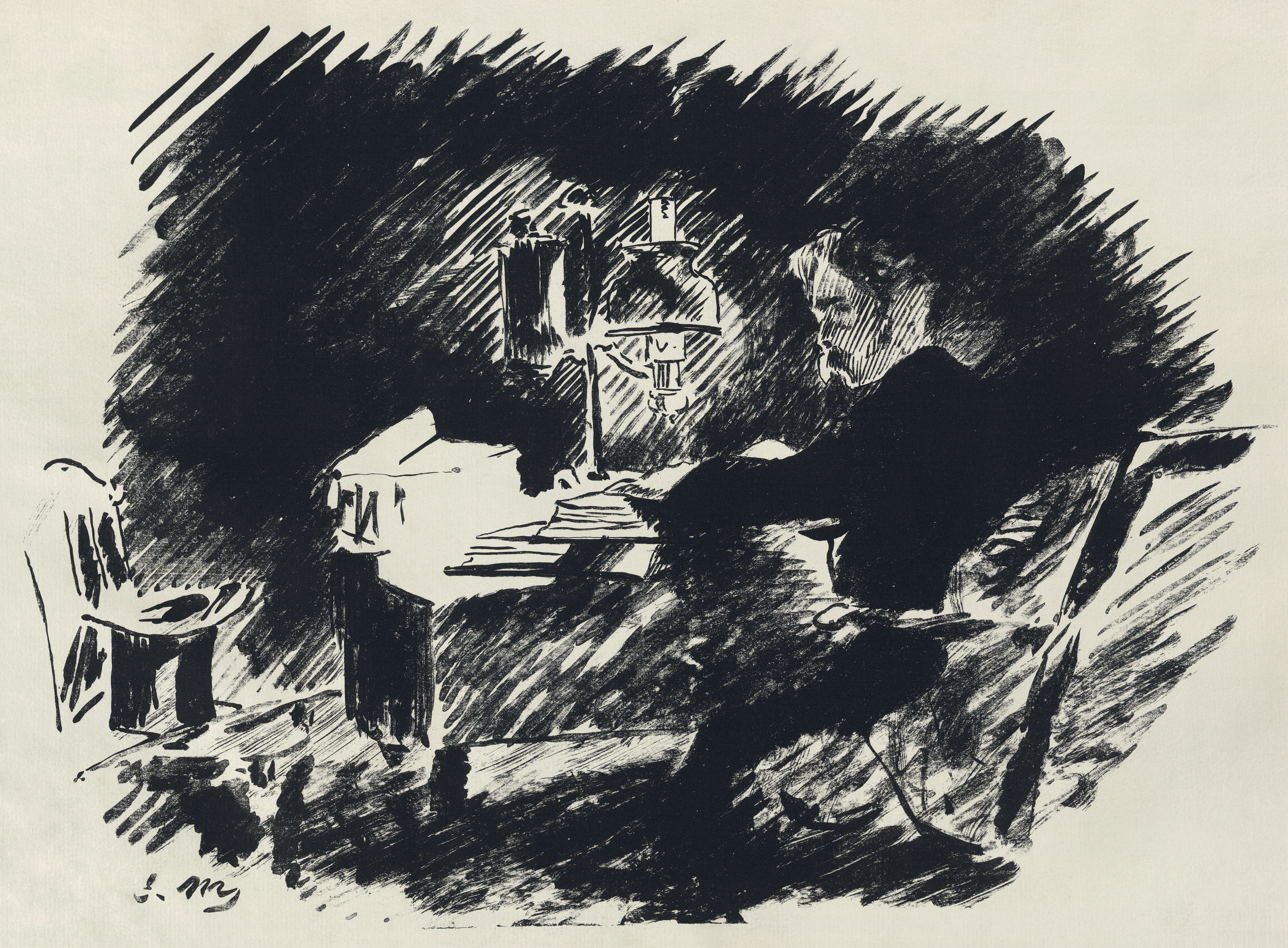
Under the Lamp (“Once upon a midnight dreary”) (1875) by Édouard Manet

Mallarmé invited Manet to illustrate his translation of Edgar Allan Poe's The Raven. Manet created four lithographic plates that illustrated key events in the poem. Manet’s illustrations were inserted between the double pages of text.

The first stanza of The Raven describes the scene "upon a midnight dreary," where the narrator, a poet, ponders over his work and hears a sudden tapping noise on his chamber door. Manet's realistic illustration of the scene shows the poet at his desk beneath the lamp. The art historian Jean Harris has commented that the man in Manet’s illustration of this scene resembles Manet’s portrait of Mallarmé.Other art historians have gone further, describing Manet's illustrations of The Raven as "images of Mallarmé himself in the role of the poet recalling his 'lost Lenore.'" Other scholars speculate that the poet in Manet's illustrations is a composite portrait of both Mallarmé and Poe.

Manet and Mallarmé's collaboration on The Raven was not financially successful. However, Manet's illustrations received praise; The Paris Journal commended Manet's "use of black and white media to depict the sinister bird and the interplay of abrupt silhouettes and threatening shadows."

== Reception ==
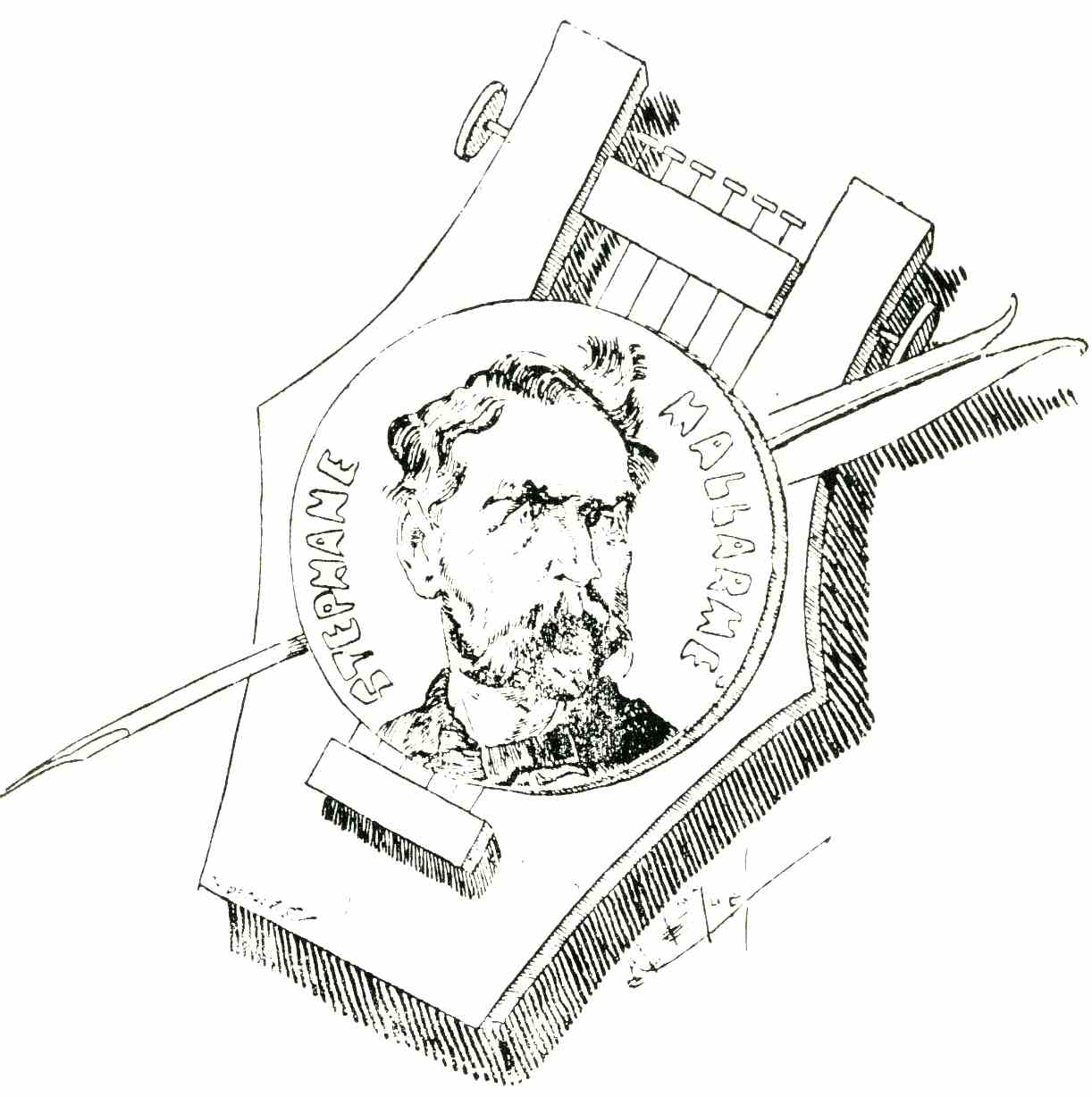
Frontispiece for the chapter on Mallarme in Les Poetes maudits (1886) by Paul Verlaine.

Manet's portrait of Mallarmé was considered by contemporaries to be the "best likeness" of Mallarmé among the many other portrait paintings and engravings of the poet. Paul-Marie Verlaine, in his book Les Poetes maudits (1886), featured a reproduction of the portrait in a chapter on Mallarmé.

== Ownership ==
In 1928, the portrait was acquired from Mallarmé's family by the Louvre Museum with the assistance of the Société des Amis du Louvre and D. David Weill. From 1947 to 1986, the painting was part of the museum's Jeu de Paume Gallery. In 1986, the painting was transferred to the Musée d'Orsay.

The painting has been displayed in many exhibitions across the world, including countries like Spain, Russia, Japan, and the United States.

== See also ==
- List of paintings by Édouard Manet
- 1876 in art
