= Woman with a Cat (Léger) =

Paintings by Fernand Léger

- Artist: Fernand Léger
- Year: 1921
- Medium: Oil on canvas
- Location: Metropolitan Museum of Art Hamburger Kunsthalle; New York Hamburg

Woman with a Cat (French: La femme au chat, German: Frau mit Katze) refers to two, almost identical 1921 abstract, post-Cubist paintings of different sizes by French painter and sculptor Fernand Léger.

The work represents one of a similar series of female figures produced during his machine aesthetic period in the early 1920s. It depicts a simple composition, with a low key, nearly monochrome nude woman formed by spheres, cones, and tubes with limited colors of red, yellow, black, and white. The paintings are thought to be a study for his later work, Three Women (Le Grand Déjeuner, 1921–1922). The larger work (130.8 × 90.5 cm) was originally part of the Gottlieb Reber collection in Switzerland until 1958; it was eventually sold to Samuel and Florene Marx and then gifted to the Metropolitan Museum of Art in 1994. The smaller work (97.5 x 70.5 x 5.5 cm) was held by Paul Rosenberg until it was purchased by the Hamburg Art Collections Foundation for the Hamburger Kunsthalle in 1967.

== Versions ==
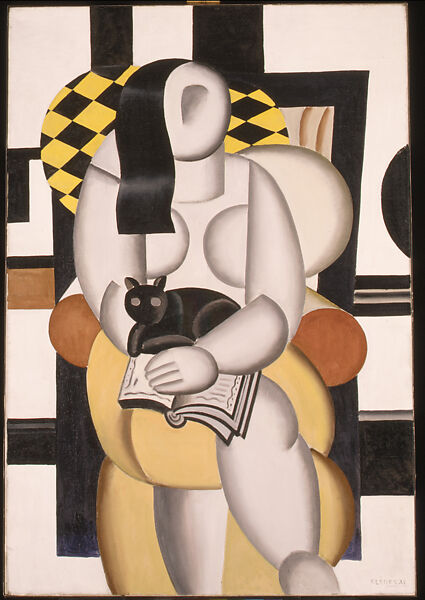
Metropolitan Museum of Art

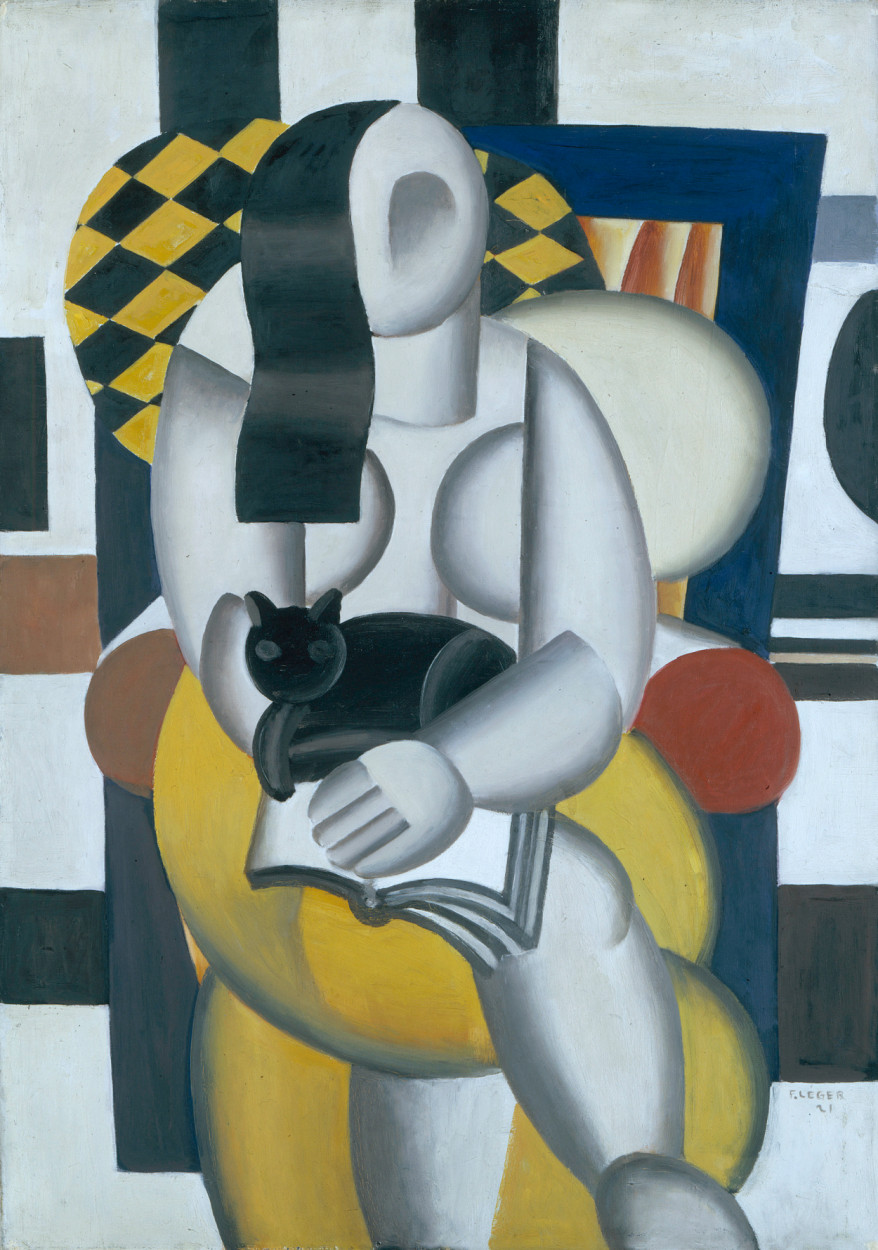
Hamburger Kunsthalle

== Bibliography ==
- Lippard, Lucy R. (1965). "LEGER. Woman with Cat, 1921." The School of Paris: Paintings from the Florene May Schoenborn and Samuel A. Marx Collection. The Museum of Modern Art. ISBN 087070575X.
- Rewald, Sabine (Fall, 1995). "Recent Acquisitions, A Selection: 1994–1995". The Metropolitan Museum of Art Bulletin. 53 (2). ISSN 0026-1521.
