= Nana (Manet) =

Painting by Édouard Manet

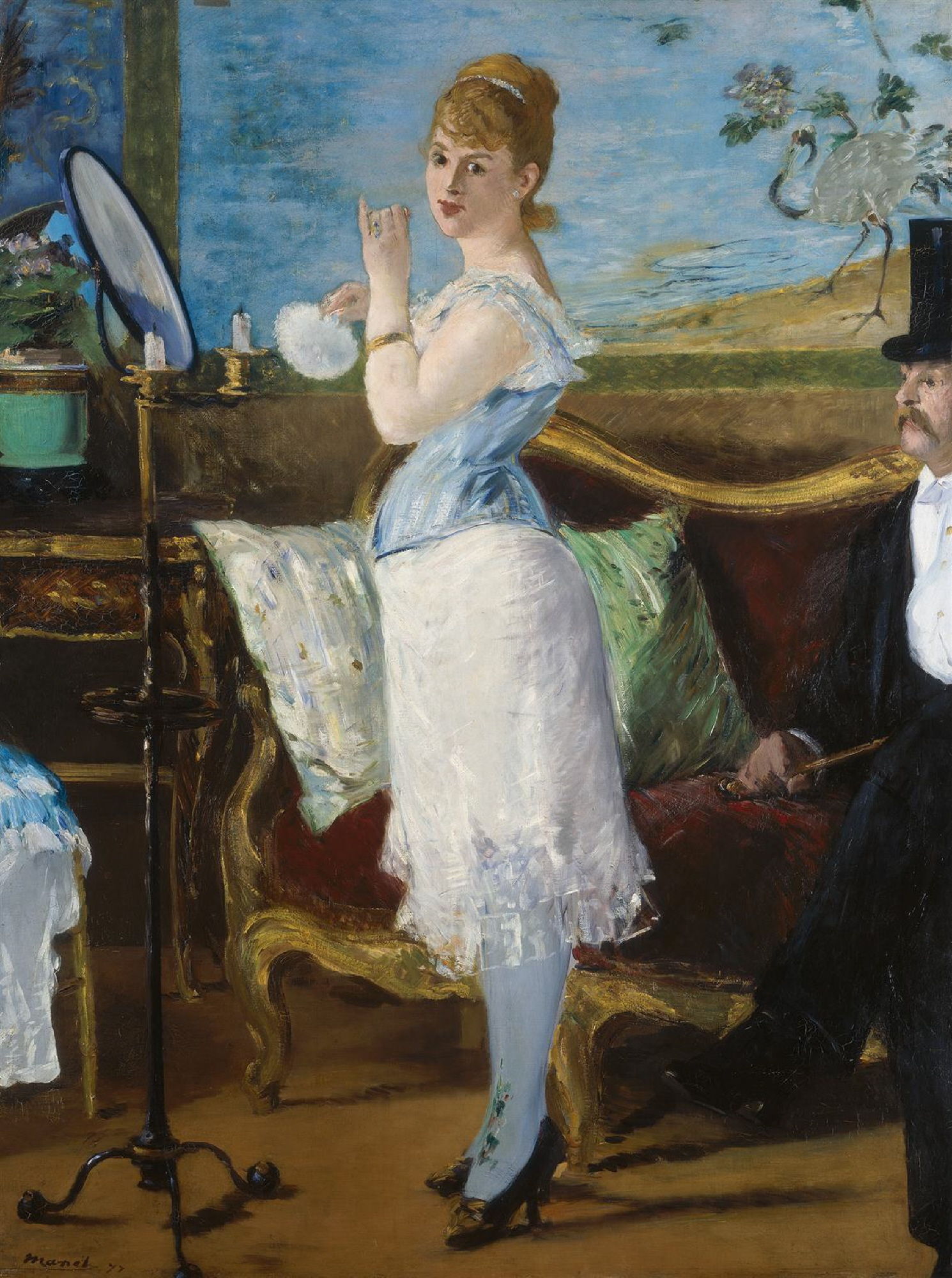
- Artist: Édouard Manet
- Year: 1877
- Medium: oil on canvas
- Dimensions: 154 cm × 115 cm (61 in × 45 in)
- Location: Kunsthalle Hamburg; Hamburg

Nana is a painting by French painter Édouard Manet. It was completed in 1877 and was refused at the Salon of Paris the same year. Manet decided to show his painting in the window of a shop on the Boulevard des Capucines, one of Paris’s main streets. The painting gathered attention and crowds during its exhibition, due to Manet's fame in Paris. The work is now at the Kunsthalle Hamburg art museum in Germany.

== Description ==
The painting shows a young and beautiful woman who stands before a mirror with two extinguished candles, her face turned to the spectator. Her dress is incomplete; she wears a white chemise, blue corset, silk stockings and high-heeled footwear. The interior suggests that it is a boudoir. Behind the woman is a sofa with two pillows. An elegantly dressed man, sitting on the sofa, can be partly seen on the right of the painting. On the left side, there is a chair, a table and a flowerpot.

== Interpretations ==
Both the title and the numerous details suggest that the picture represents a high class prostitute and her client. "Nana" was a popular assumed name for female prostitutes during the second half of the 19th century (much like the connotation "Candy" has had for English-speakers more recently). Even today the French word "nana" is used to describe a frivolous woman (or simply "a female" in argot).

The model for the painting was Henriette Hauser, a well-known courtesan of the era.

== Reception ==
Manet wanted to present the painting at the Salon of Paris but it was rejected because it was deemed to be contemptuous of the morality of the time. French society was not prepared for such frank depictions of prostitution, and the critics did not see the artistic qualities of the work and concentrated solely on the scene which was represented. One of the defenders of Manet was Émile Zola who in 1880 published a novel of the same name as the ninth volume of Les Rougon-Macquart series. However, there is no clear evidence of mutual inspiration in the choice of the theme and the title as the book was published three years later. It is likely that Manet found inspiration in L'Assommoir, Zola's previous book, in which the character of Nana appears for the first time.

== See also ==
- List of paintings by Édouard Manet
- The museum's online collection
- 1877 in art
