= Miron Schmückle =

German-Romanian artist, stage designer and cultural researcher (born 1966)

Miron Schmückle (born 1966 in Sibiu/Hermannstadt) is a German-Romanian artist, stage designer and cultural researcher. He lives and works as a freelance artist in Berlin (Germany) since 2008.

In his drawings, Schmückle develops a hybrid, botanical world of forms that moves between hyperrealism and escapism of reality through his interest in art history as well as his preoccupation with non-European flora and fauna. This still finds application above all in his scientific-botanical plant still lifes, whose complex structures Schmückle does not copy from natural models, but composes independently.

== Life and artistic development ==
Schmückle grew up in Romania during the Ceaușescu dictatorship. According to Schmückle's autobiographical texts, his interest in art history was aroused by a joint visit to the Brukenthal Museum with his father in the 1970s. Here he was impressed by the paintings of the polymath Joris Hoefnagel with his allegorical cabinet miniatures from 1597.

In 1988 he left Romania and emigrated to the Federal Republic of Germany. Between 1991 and 1996 he studied Experimental Painting at the Muthesius Academy of Art in Kiel (Germany), among others with Renate Anger. In 1994 he joined the performance artist Marina Abramović at the University of Fine Arts of Hamburg. Since, in Schmückle's view, conceptual art was very dominant at universities in the mid-1990s and drawing was not taught at university, he taught himself to do this independently. His self-study drawings eventually serve as his final project at Muthesius.

Between 1995 and 1996, Schmückle held a teaching position at the Saint Petersburg Theatre Academy in the field of installation art.

When the art market collapsed due to the financial crisis in 2008 and commissions thus failed to materialise, Schmückle wrote his doctoral thesis, which was published at the Muthesius Academy of Fine Arts in 2016 under the title Una terza natura. In terms of content, his doctoral thesis deals with the cabinet miniatures of Joris Hoefnagel.

== Exhibitions (selection) ==
=== Solo exhibitions ===
- 1997 – Museum Ostdeutsche Galerie, Regensburg (Germany): Hortus conclusus
- 1997 – Kunsthalle Kiel, Kiel (Germany): over a long season
- 2001 – Galerie Anita Beckers, Frankfurt am Main (Germany): Super Cascade Improved Mixed
- 2002 – Hamburger Kunsthalle, Hamburg (Germany): Fountains of Joy. Improved Formula
- 2004 – Gallery Anita Beckers, Frankfurt am Main (Germany): Capriccio
- 2005 – Gallery Dörrie*Priess, Hamburg (Germany): New Works
- 2007 – Gallery Emmanuel Post, Leipzig (Germany): de naturae corporis fabrica
- 2007 – Gallery Rena Bransten, San Francisco (USA): Rococo Revisited
- 2009 – Brukenthal Museum, Sibiu (Romania): The Strife of Love in a Dream
- 2010 – Gallery Dörrie*Priess, Hamburg (Germany): illectus eram
- 2011 – Gallery Manzoni Schäper, Berlin (Germany): As You Desire Me
- 2016 – Kunstmuseum Bayreuth, Bayreuth (Germany): Una terza natura
- 2017 – Anca Poteraşu Gallery, Bucharest (Romania): Non saturatur oculus visu
- 2023 – Städel Museum, Frankfurt am Main (Germany): Miron Schmückle. Flesh for Fantasy

=== Group exhibitions ===
- 1998 – 4th International Photo Triennial, Esslingen (Germany)
- 1999 – 2nd Ars Baltica Triennial of Photographic Art
- 1999 – Kunsthalle Kiel, Kiel (Germany): Photography on Site
- 2000 – Gallery Dörrie*Priess, Hamburg (Germany): In the Garden
- 2000 – Kunsthaus Hamburg, Hamburg (Germany): Reflected Images
- 2001 – Ursula-Blickle-Foundation, Kraichtal (Germany)
- 2001 – Palais for Contemporary Art, Glückstadt (Germany): Desire
- 2002 – Museo Galleria d'Arte Moderna, Bologna (Italy): Desire
- 2002 – 2nd Triennial of Photography, Hamburg (Germany): Still Life
- 2002 – Kallmann Museum, Ismaning (Germany): Self Portraits
- 2003 – Kunsthaus Erfurt, Erfurt (Germany): Kunsthappen
- 2003 – Kunsthaus Erfurt, Erfurt (Germany): You and your garden
- 2004 – Museum Haus Esters, Krefeld (Germany): Zwischenwelten
- 2004 – Schwules Museum, Berlin (Germany): 19 artists as guests at the Schwules Museum
- 2004 – Wifredo Lam Foundation, Havana (Cuba): Bailar en la casa del trompo
- 2005 – Kunstraum München, Munich (Germany): Jungle Park
- 2005 – Museum Morsbroich, Leverkusen (Germany): Flower Pieces
- 2006 – Chiesa di San Paolo, Modena (Italy): Fai da te - il mondo dell artista
- 2007 – Post Fine Arts, Freiburg (Germany): Bilderbühne
- 2008 – Post Fine Arts, Freiburg (Germany): Menschenskind
- 2008 – Municipal Gallery Villa Zanders, Bergisch Gladbach (Germany): Pas de deux
- 2009 – Post Fine Arts, Freiburg (Germany): Coming Under the Spotlight
- 2009 – Kunsthalle Göppingen, Göppingen (Germany): Flower Pieces
- 2010 – Alexander Ochs Galleries, Beijing (China): Beauty - Flowers in Photography
- 2013 – Collège des Bernardins, Paris (France): Tree of Life
- 2017 – Kallmann Museum, Ismaning (Germany): Beautifully Ephemeral - Flowers in Contemporary Art
- 2019 – Sprengel Museum, Hanover (Germany): Four Times New on Paper
- 2021 – Staatliche Kunsthalle Karlsruhe, Karlsruhe (Germany): Inventing Nature. Plants in Art
- 2021 – Kunsthalle München, Munich (Germany): Flowers Forever. Flowers in Art and Culture

== Works in public and private art collections (selection) ==
Schmückle's works are represented in renowned collections worldwide, including:

- Kunsthalle Kiel, Kiel (Germany)
- Ludwig Forum for International Art, Aachen (Germany)
- Kunstforum Ostdeutsche Galerie, Regensburg (Germany)
- Internationales Künstlerhaus Villa Concordia, Bamberg (Germany)
- Isobe Art Collection, Tokyo (Japan)
- West Collection, Pennsylvania (USA)
- Schwules Museum, Berlin (Germany)
- City Gallery, Kiel (Germany)
- Berlinische Galerie - State Museum of Modern Art, Berlin (Germany)
