= Hamburger Kunsthalle =

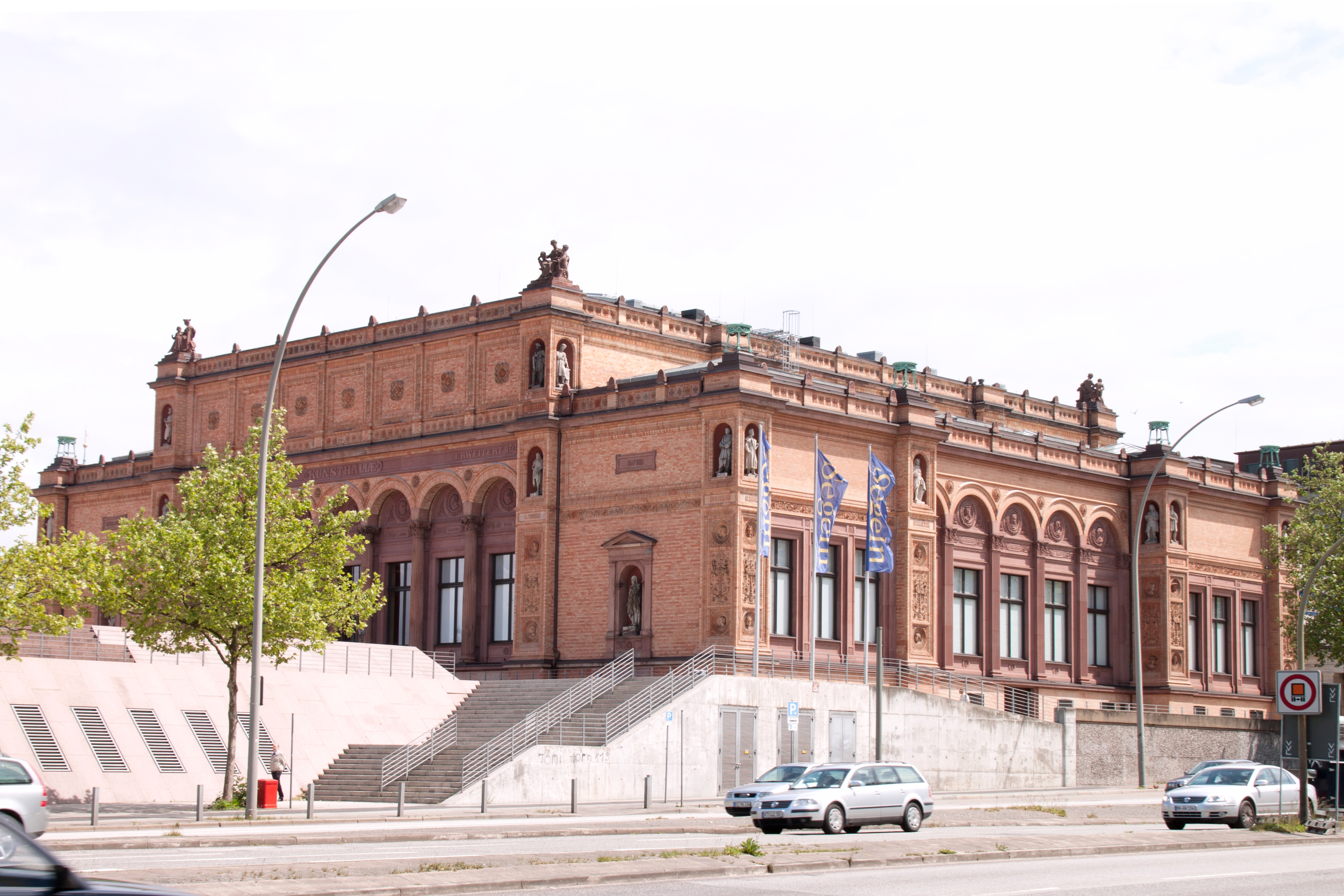
- Established: 20 August 1869
- Location: Glockengießerwall; 20095 Hamburg, Germany
- Coordinates: 53°33′18″N 10°00′11″E
- Type: Art museum
- Visitors: 601.612 (2024), 382,000 (2013)
- Director: Alexander Klar
- Owners: Free and Hanseatic City of Hamburg
- Public transit access: Hauptbahnhof Nord
- Website: hamburger-kunsthalle.de

The Hamburger Kunsthalle is the art museum of the Free and Hanseatic City of Hamburg, Germany. It is one of the largest art museums in the country. It consists of three connected buildings, dating from 1869 (main building), 1921 (Kuppelsaal) and 1997 (Galerie der Gegenwart), located in the Altstadt district between the Hauptbahnhof (central train station) and the two Alster lakes.

The name Kunsthalle indicates the museum's history as an 'art hall' when it was founded in 1850. Today, it houses one of the few art collections in Germany that cover seven centuries of European art, from the Middle Ages to the present day. Its permanent collections focus on North German painting of the 14th century, paintings by Dutch, Flemish and Italian artists of the 16th and 17th centuries, French and German drawings and paintings of the 19th century, and international modern and contemporary art.

== History ==
The museum collection traces its origin to 1849, when it was initially established by the Hamburg Kunstverein, which was founded in 1817. The collection opened to the public a year later as the Städtische Gallerie (municipal painting gallery).

The collection grew quickly, and it soon became necessary to provide a suitable building. The original red-brick Kunsthalle building was constructed from 1863 to 1869. It was designed by architects Georg Theodor Schirrmacher and Hermann von der Hude, and financed largely through private donations.

The Kunsthalle's first director was the art historian and educator Alfred Lichtwark (1852–1914). His successor during the interwar period was Gustav Pauli. He oversaw the completion of the Kuppelsaal (domed-hall) extension, the museum's first annex, designed by Fritz Schumacher and erected between 1914 and 1921.

In 1994, a painting of the Kunsthalle was involved in the so-called Frankfurt art theft. While on loan to the Kunsthalle Schirn in Frankfurt, the painting Nebelschwaden by Caspar David Friedrich was stolen. After negotiations with the thieves, a lawyer bought back the painting; when the Kunsthalle refused to pay him the agreed "consideration", he sued and won.

In 1997, the museum opened the Galerie der Gegenwart building, an extension of 5,600 square metres (60,000 sq ft) that was designed by Cologne architect Oswald Mathias Ungers and that is dedicated to the Kunsthalle's contemporary art collections. The cubic building sits on a monolithic base at a prominent location in close proximity to the Binnenalster.

== Collections ==
The Kunsthalle is divided into four different sections: the Gallery of Old Masters, the Gallery of 19th-century Art, the Gallery of Classical Modernism, and the Gallery of Contemporary Art.

The highlights of the collection include the medieval alters of Master Bertram and Master Francke, 17th-century Dutch paintings, works of early to mid 19th-century German Romanticism, and collections of impressionism and classic modernism. The Kunsthalle is also known for its international contemporary art collections and exhibitions, which include post-1950 Pop Art, conceptual art, video art and photography.

=== Old Masters ===
The Old Masters Collection shows works by Bartel Beham, Bernardo Bellotto, Lucas Cranach the Younger, Master Francke, Francisco José de Goya y Lucientes, Johann Georg Hinz, Jan Massys, Giambattista Pittoni, Rembrandt Harmensz van Rijn, Peter Paul Rubens, Jacob Isaacksz van Ruisdael and Giovanni Battista Tiepolo, among others.

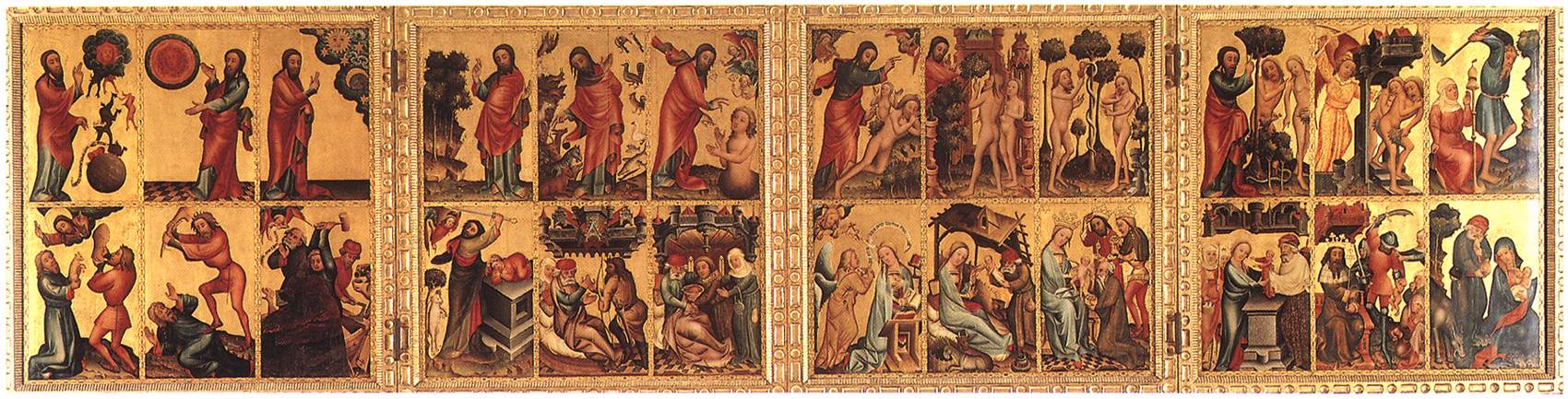
Master Bertram: Grabow Altarpiece (1383)

=== 19th-century art ===
The Gallery of 19th-century Art shows work by Carl Blechen, Arnold Böcklin, Gustave Courbet, Edgar Degas, Anselm Feuerbach, Caspar David Friedrich, Jean-Léon Gérôme, Wilhelm Leibl, Max Liebermann, Édouard Manet, Adolph Menzel, Claude Monet, Auguste Rodin and Philipp Otto Runge, among others.

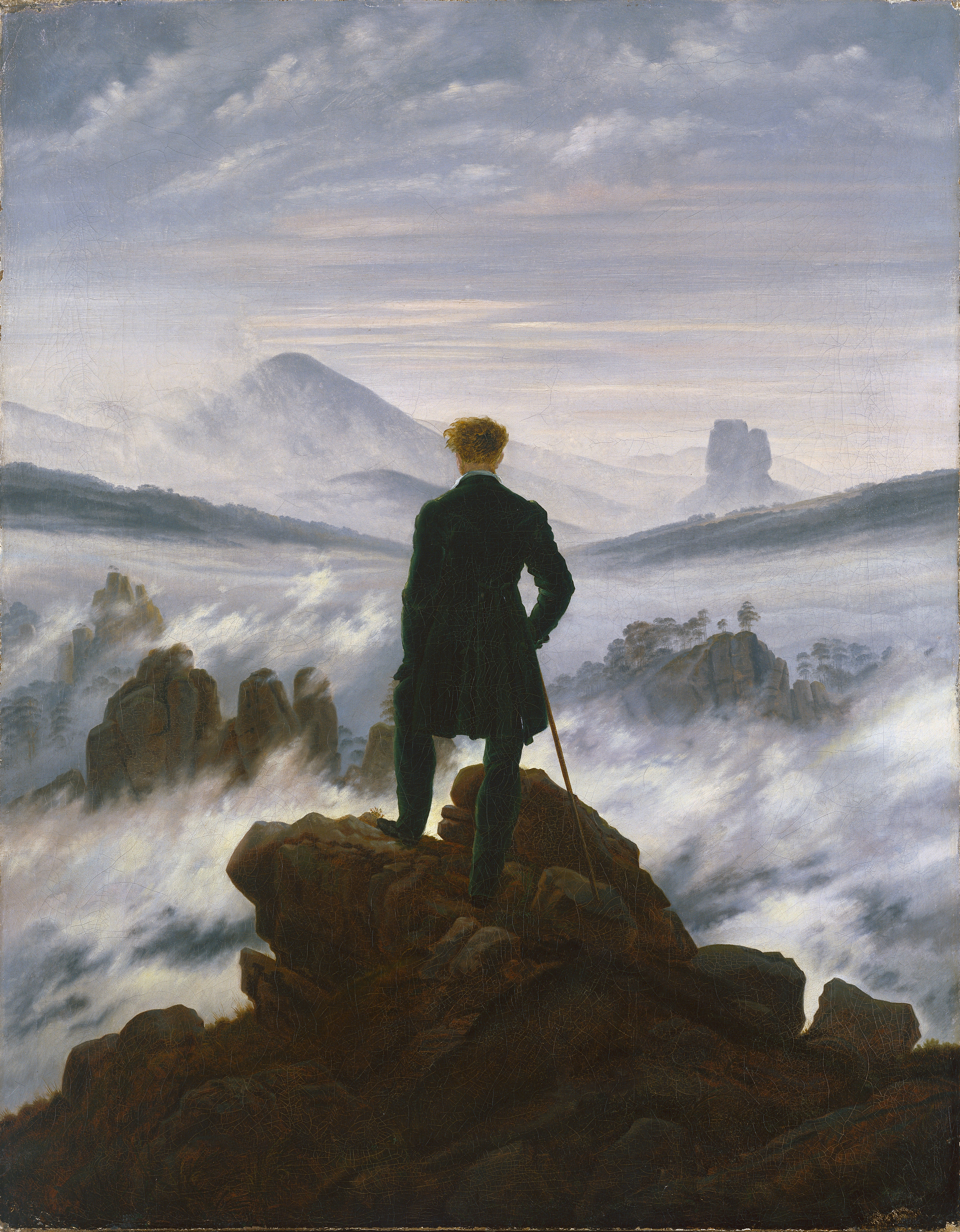
C. D. Friedrich: Wanderer above the Sea of Fog (1818)

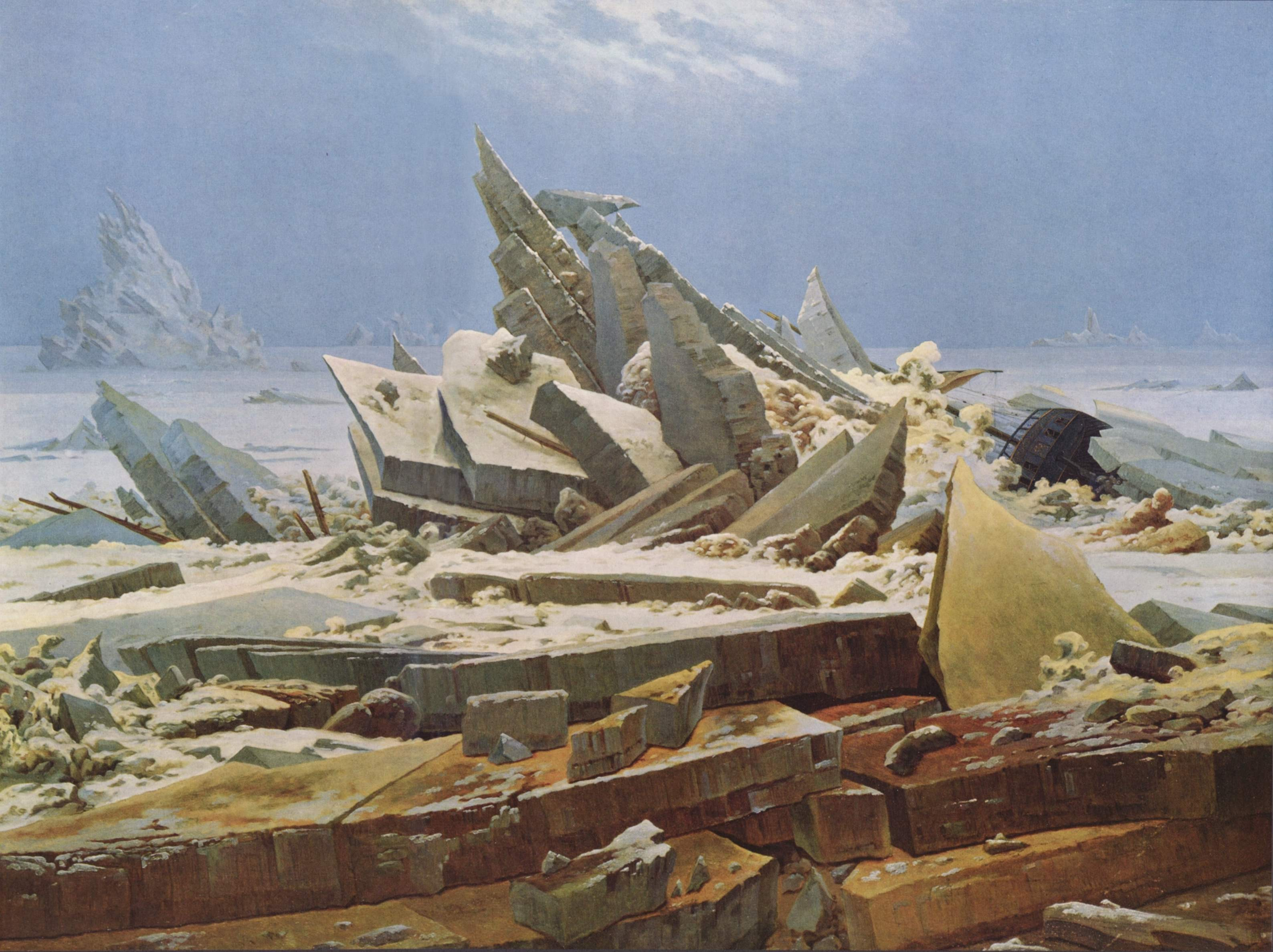
C. D. Friedrich:
The Sea of Ice (1824)

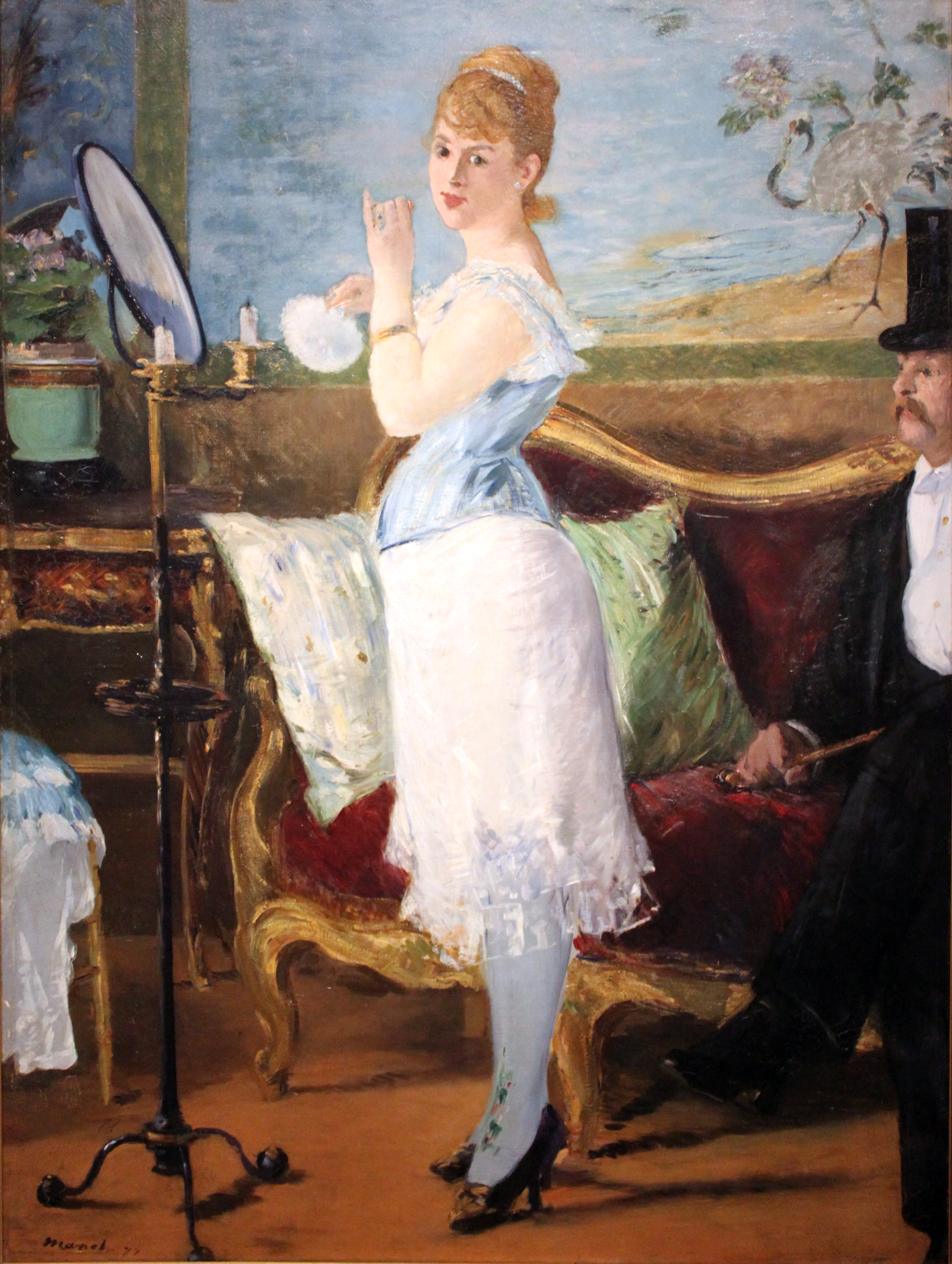
Édouard Manet:
Nana (1877)

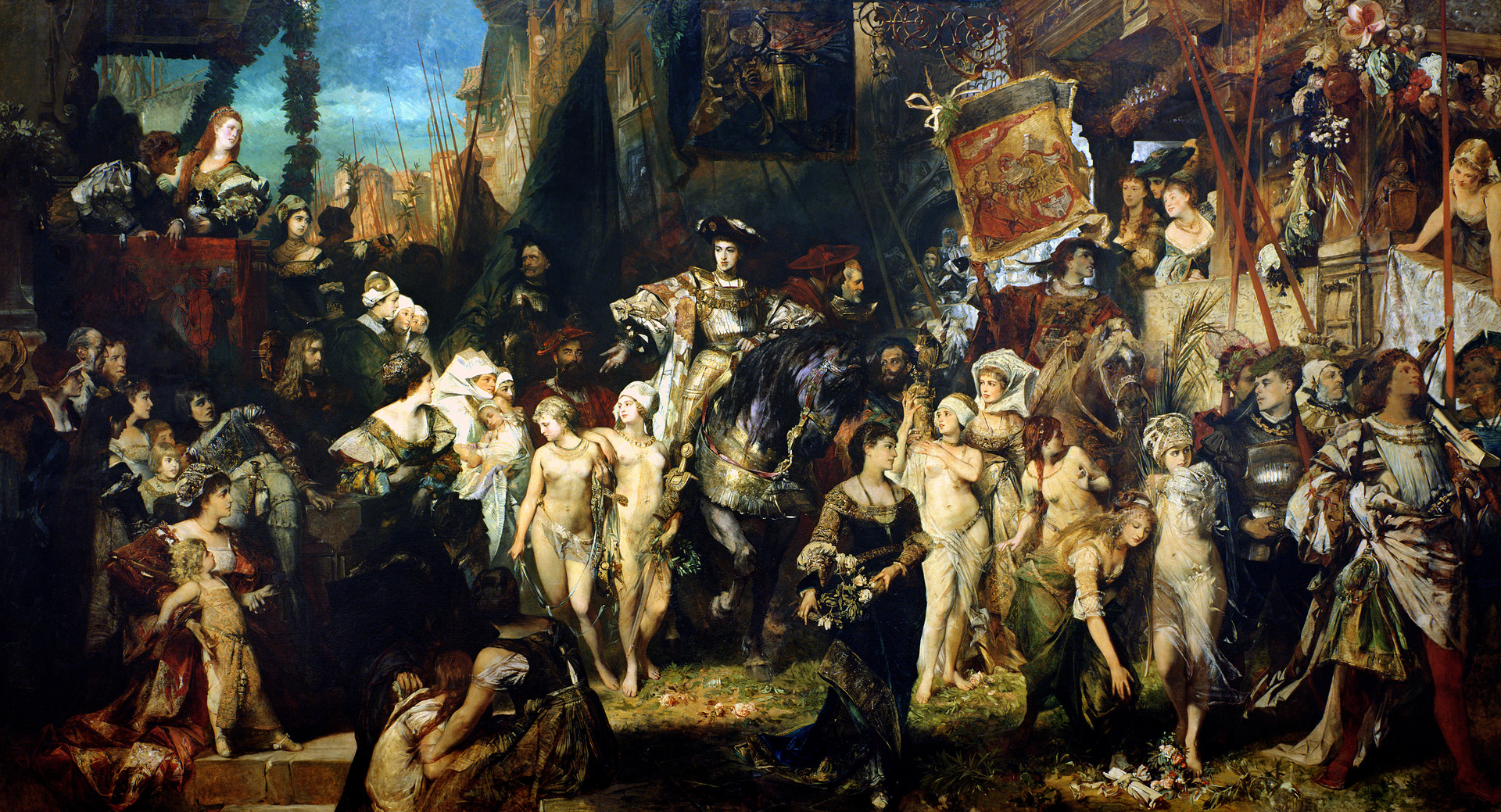
Hans Makart:
The Entry of Charles V into Antwerp (1878)

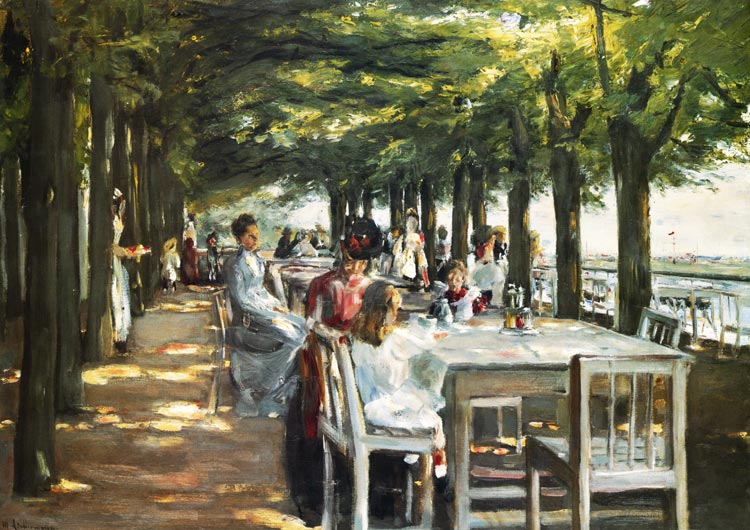
Max Liebermann:
Jacob Restaurant (1902)

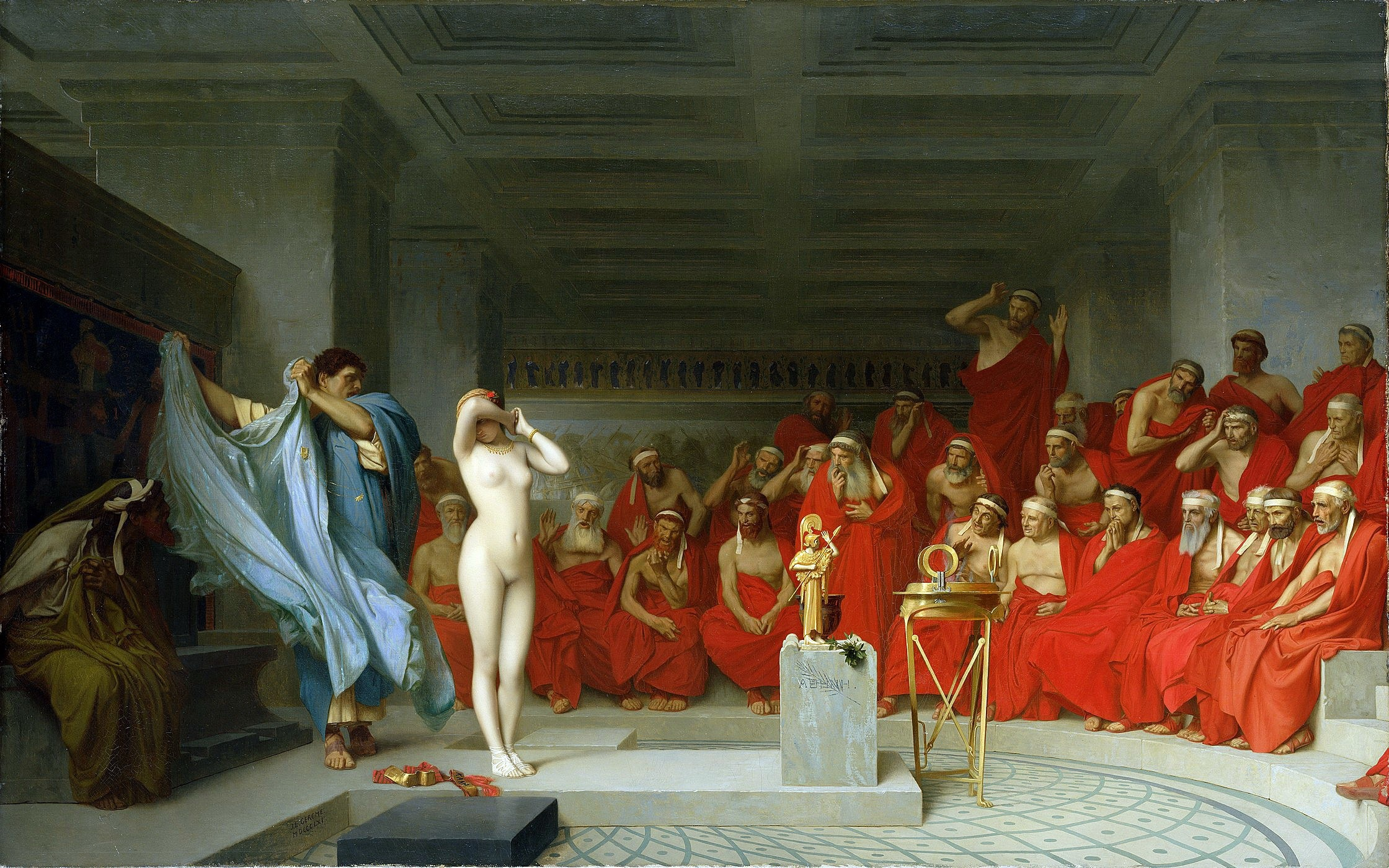
Jean-Léon Gérôme:
Phryne before the Areopagus (1861)

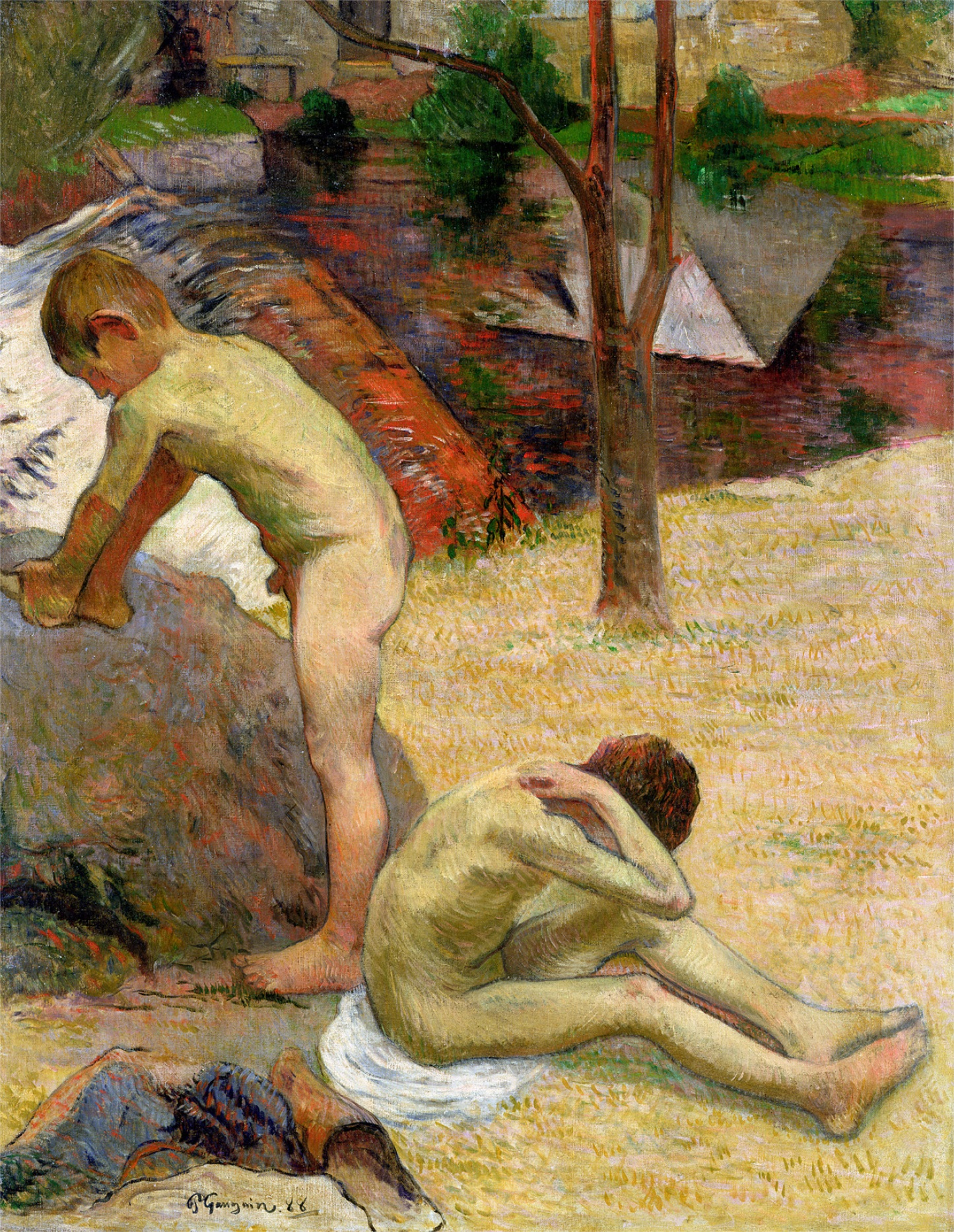
Paul Gauguin:
Breton Boys Bathing (1888)

=== Modern art ===
The Classical Modernism gallery shows works by Francis Bacon, Max Beckmann, Lovis Corinth, James Ensor, Max Ernst, Ernst Ludwig Kirchner, Paul Klee, Oskar Kokoschka, Paula Modersohn-Becker, Edvard Munch, Emil Nolde and Pablo Picasso, among others.

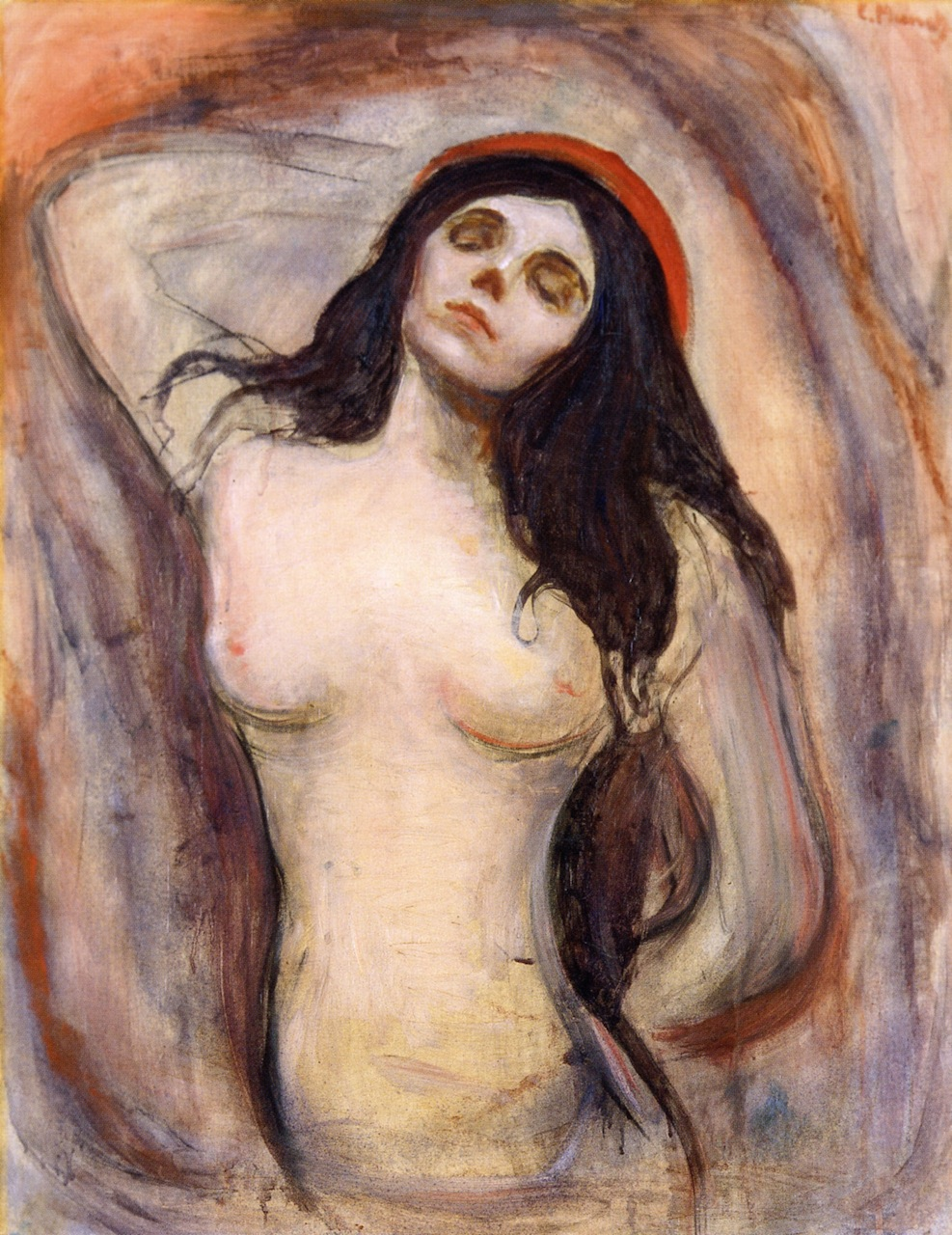
Edvard Munch:
Madonna (1895)

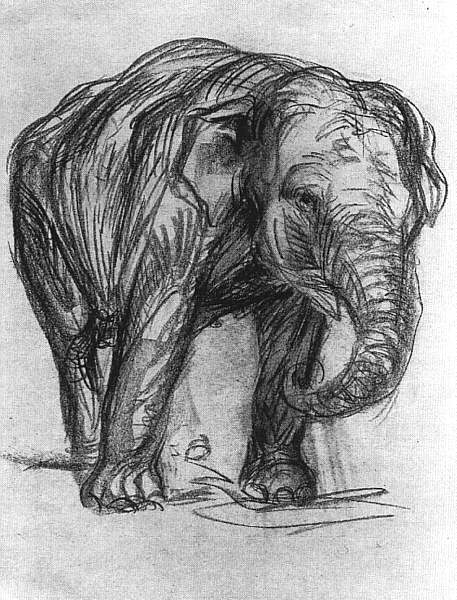
Franz Marc:
Elephant (1907)

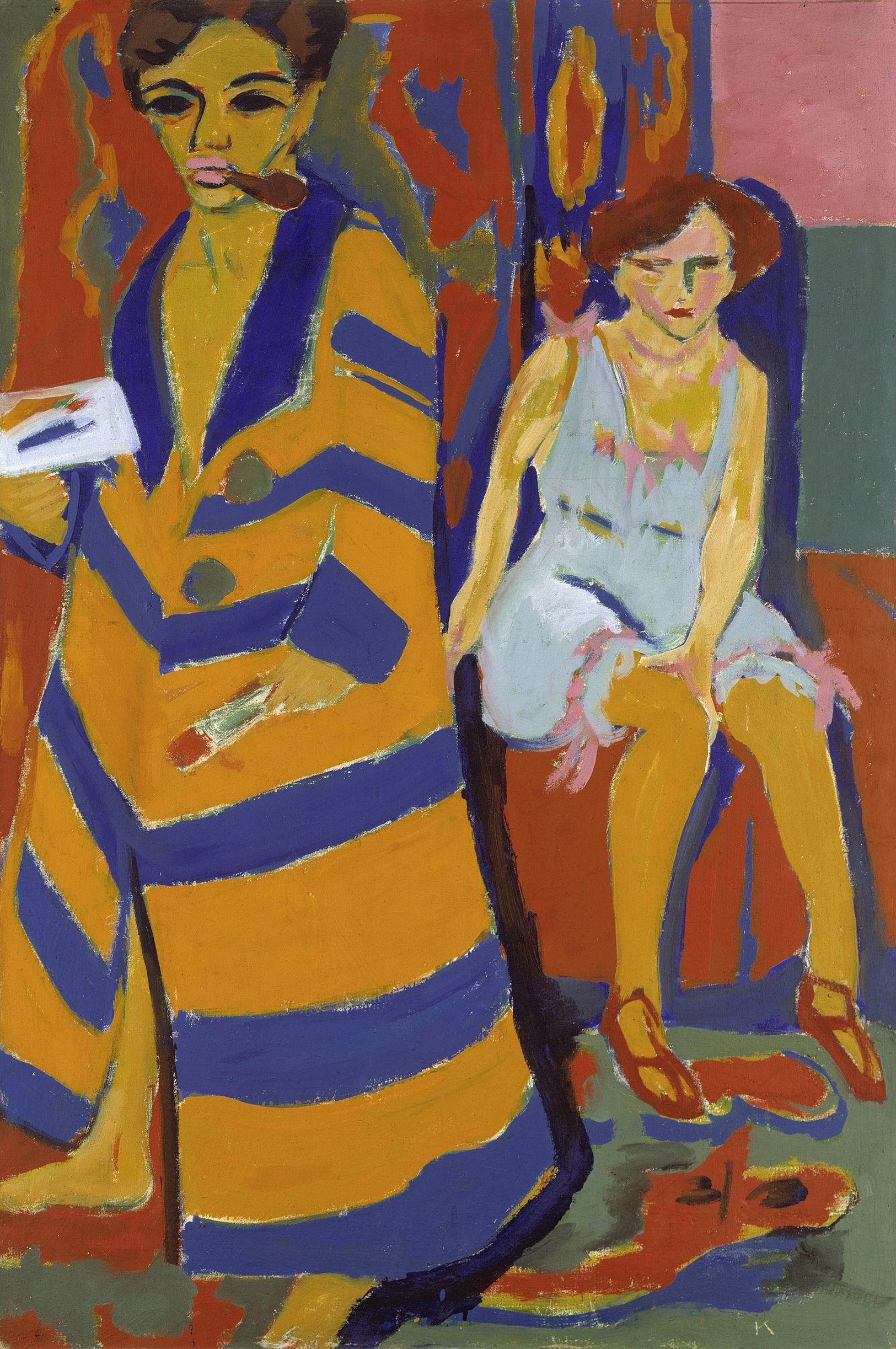
Ernst Ludwig Kirchner:
Self-portrait with model (1910)

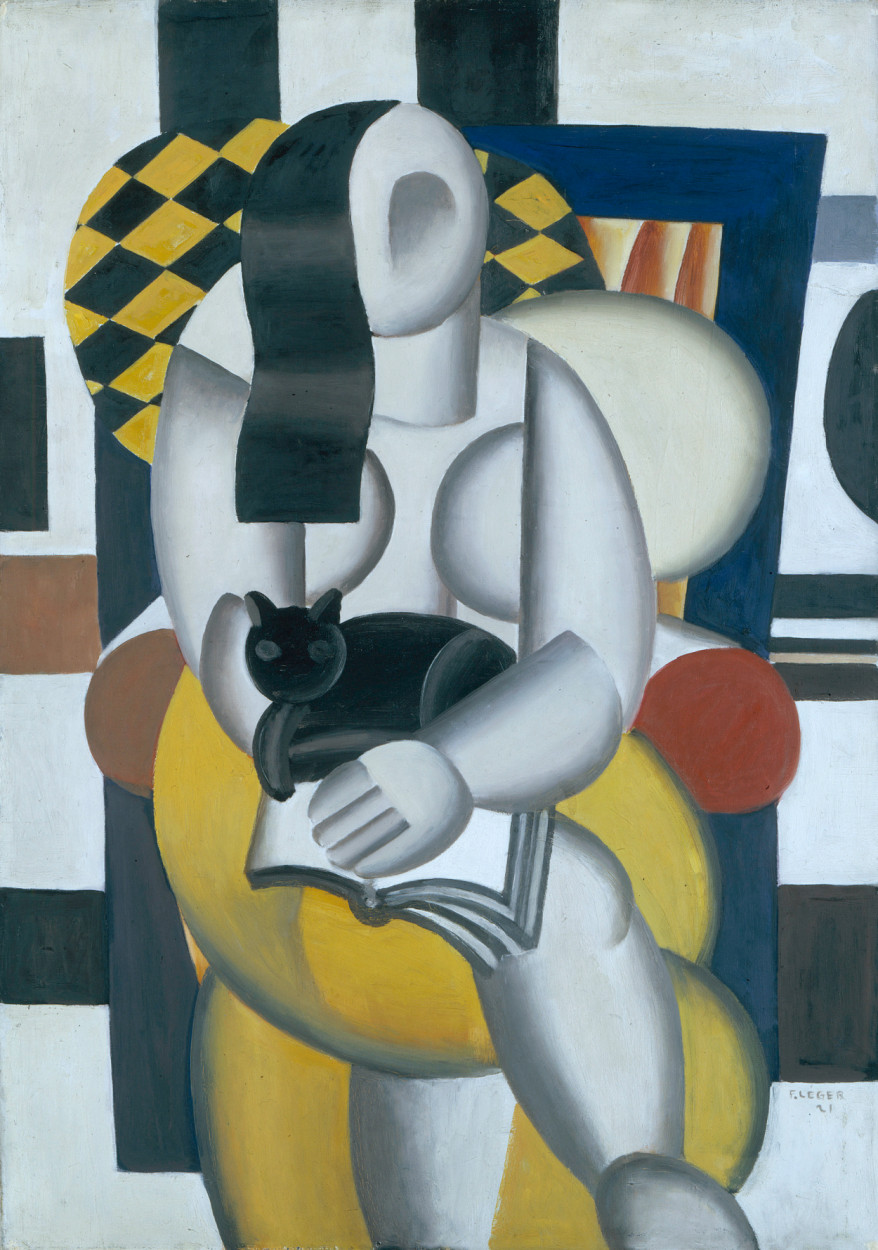
Fernand Léger:
Woman with a Cat (1921) (1 of 2 versions, 97.5 x 70.5 x 5.5 cm)

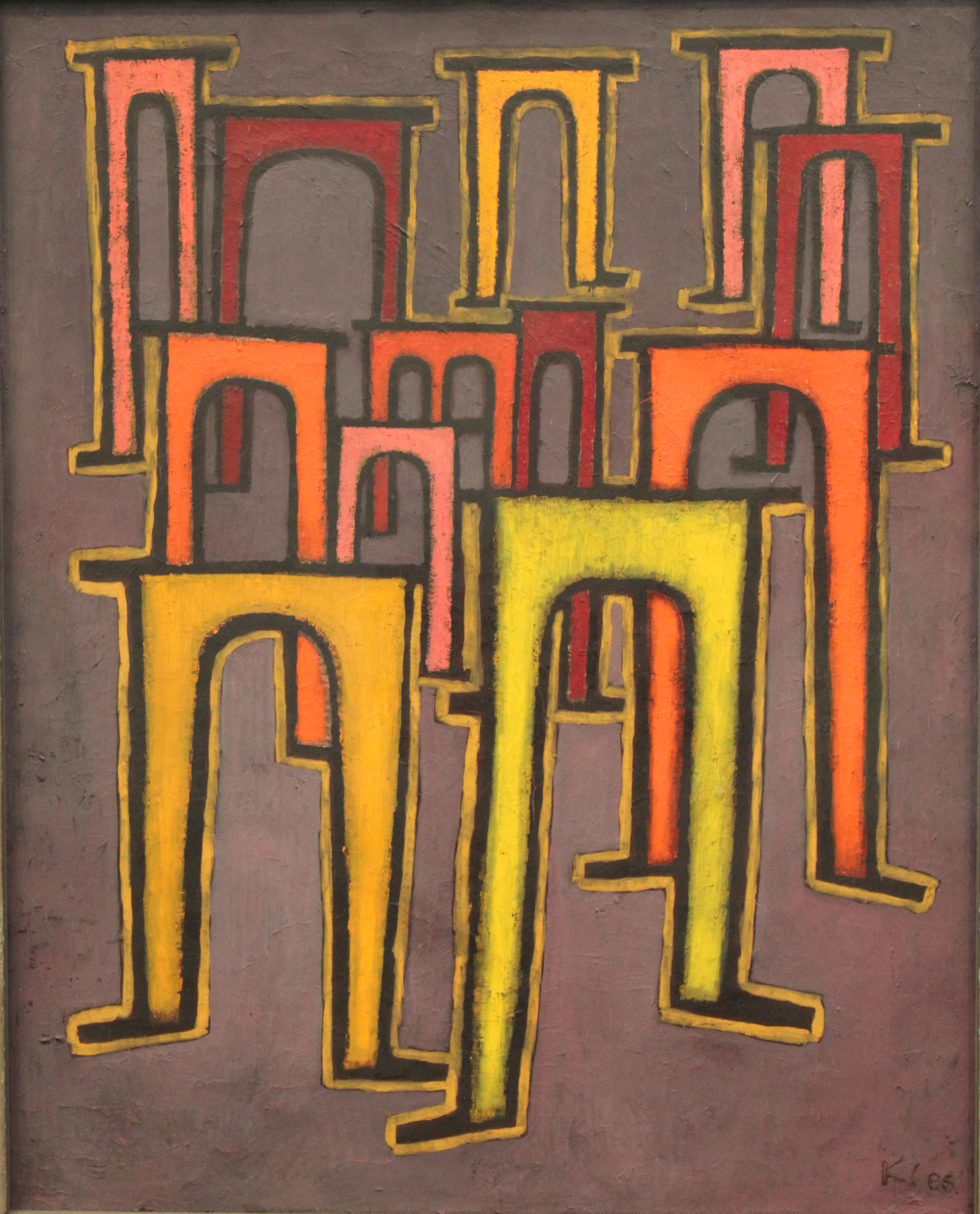
Paul Klee:
Revolution of the Viaduct (1937)

=== Contemporary art ===
The Gallery of Contemporary Art shows works by Joseph Beuys, Tracey Emin, David Hockney, Rebecca Horn, Ilya Kabakov, On Kawara, Yves Klein, Kitty Kraus, Robert Morris, Hermann Nitsch, George Segal, Richard Serra, Franz Erhard Walther, and Andy Warhol, among others.

== Temporary exhibitions ==
The Hamburg Kunsthalle continuously carries out temporary exhibitions on contemporary and historic art, in addition to its constant rotation of temporary exhibitions. Yearly there are on average 20 special exhibitions.

- 1970 (19 February – 30 March): Italian Art, Gianni Mattioli Collection
- 2002: Miron Schmückle. Fountains of Joy. Improved Formula
- 2010–2011: Cosmos Runge. The Dawn of Romanticism
- 2011–2012: Max Liebermann. Pioneer of Modern Art
- 2012–2013: Giacometti. The Playing Fields
- 2013–2014: Serial Attitudes, Repetition as an artistic method since the 1960s
- 2013–2014: Alfred Flechtheim.com, Art Dealer of the Avant-Garde
- 2014–2015: ars viva Prize for Fine Arts
- 2014–2015: Max Beckmann. The Still Lifes
- 2014–2015: Feuerbach's Muses — Lagerfeld's Models
- 2014–2016: SPOT ON, Masterpieces from the Hamburger Kunsthalle
- 2015–2016: Nolde in Hamburg
- 2023–2024: Caspar David Friedrich

== Gallery ==
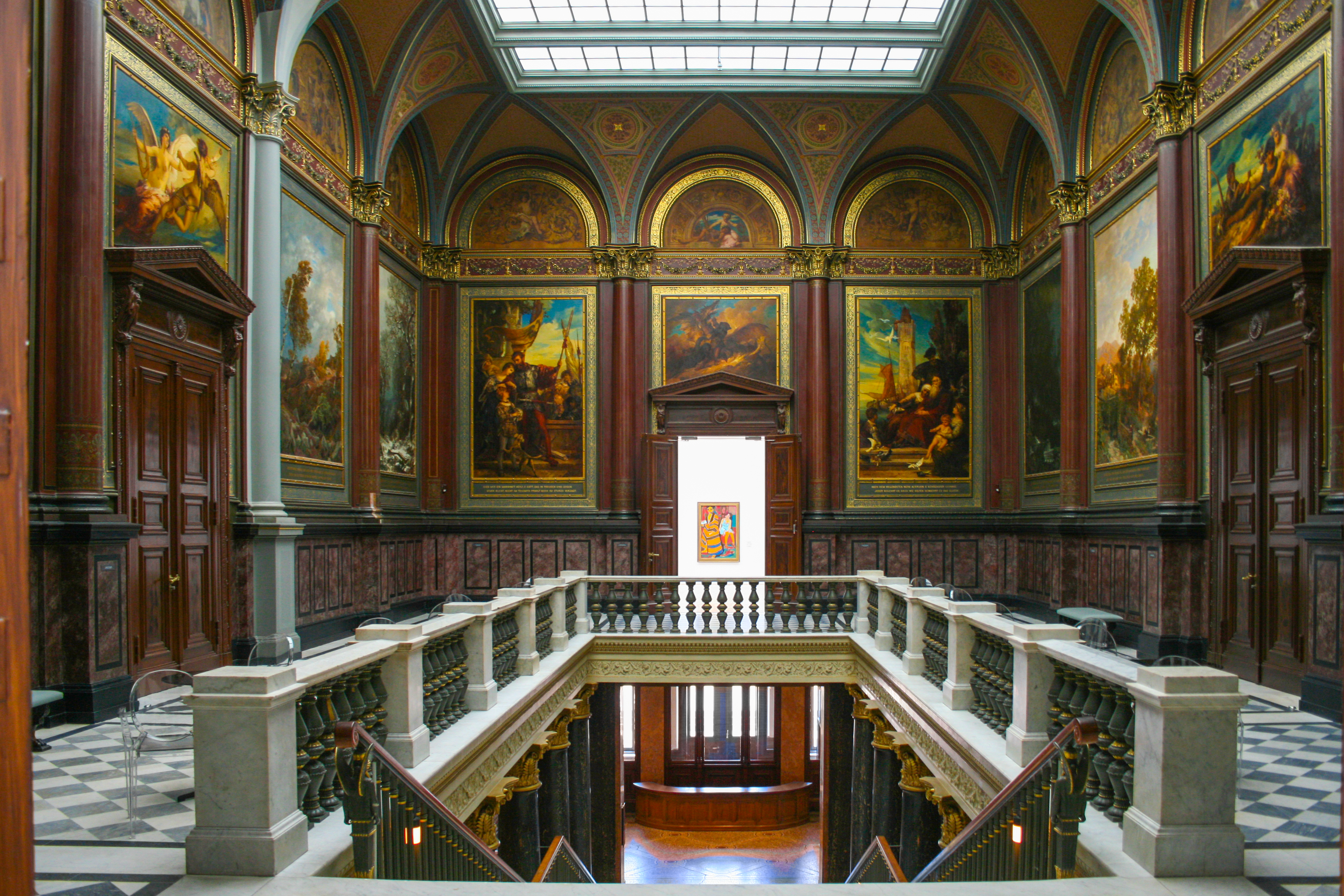
Old staircase

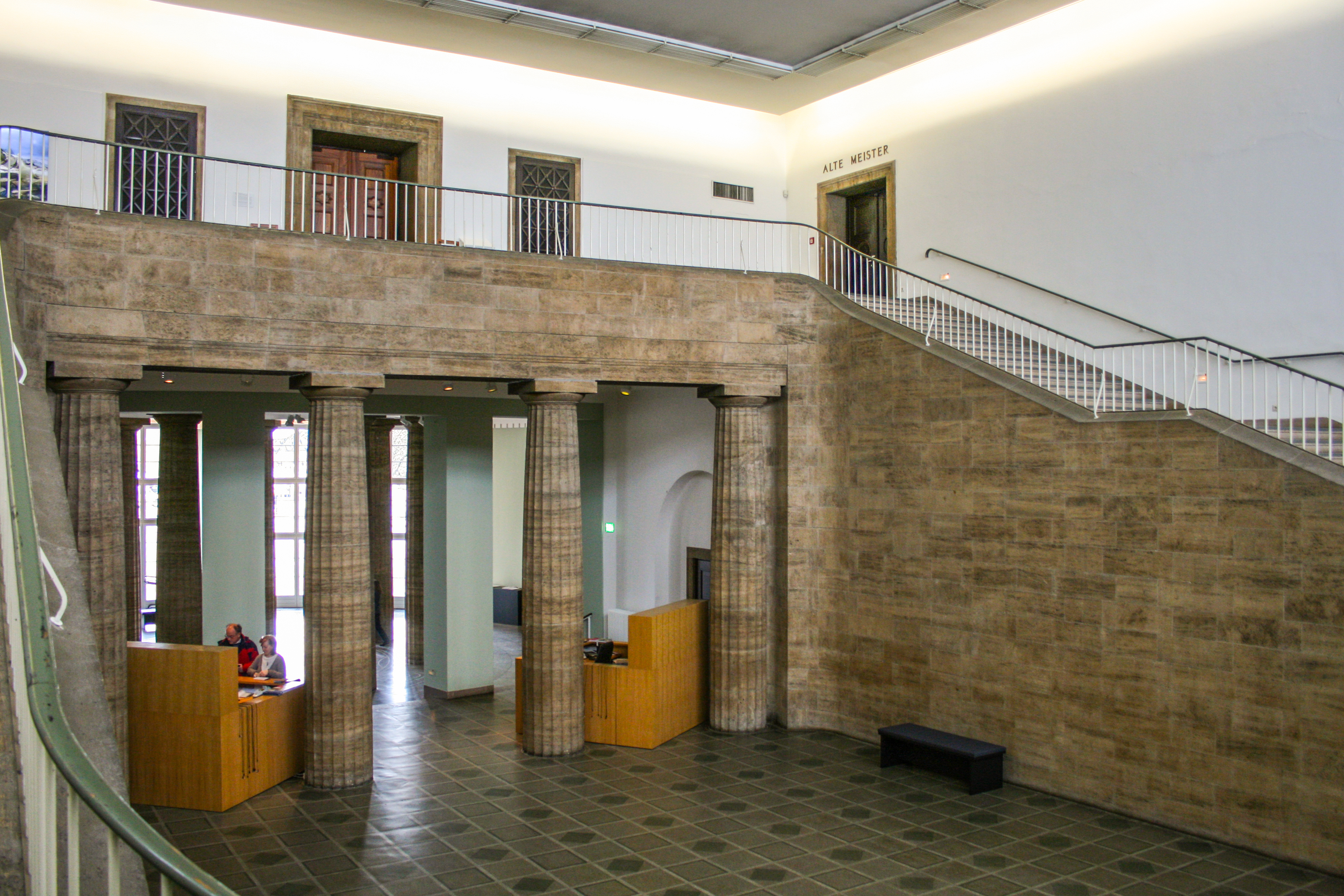
Stairwell at the entrance

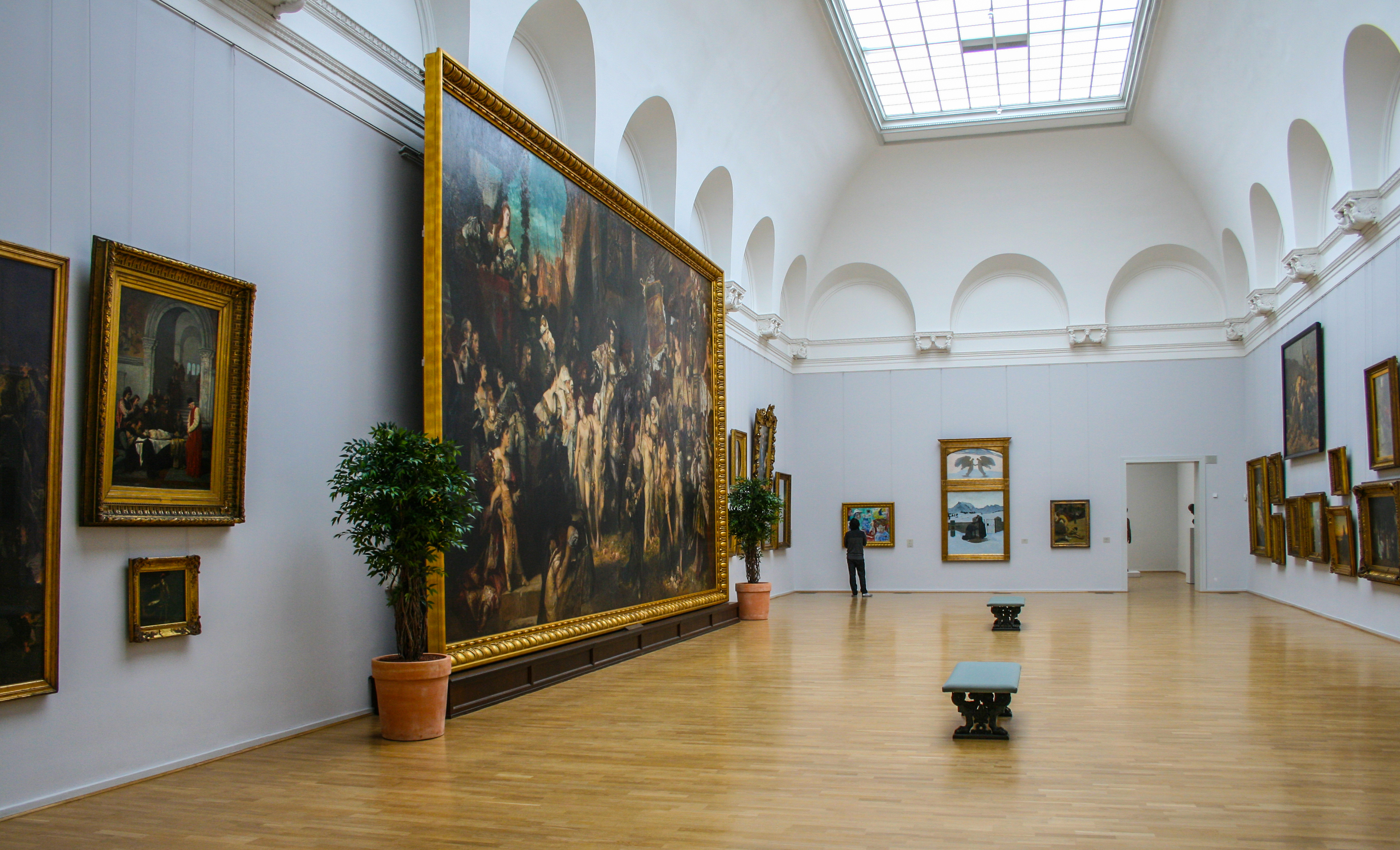
Exhibition hall

== Nazi looted art controversies ==
In December 2023, the museum received public criticism for its response to a restitution claim by the family of Holocaust victim Robert Graetz concerning Paula Modersohn-Becker's painting Girl's Head. Listed for more than twenty years on the German Lost Art Foundation's website, the painting passed through the Nazi art dealer Konrad Doebbeke and was gifted to the museum by Doebbeke's widow. The museum director Alexander Klar rejected the claim stating, "It is simply not clear whether this work is the one that hung in the Robert Graetz collection.

== See also ==
- List of museums and cultural institutions in Hamburg
- List of art museums
- List of largest art museums
