= Henriette Hauser =

French actress, model and courtesan

- Born: c. 1830; Paris, France
- Died: 1895; Paris, France
- Other names: Henriette Hausser, Citron
- Occupations: Actress, courtesan, model
- Known for: Model for Manet's Nana

Henriette Hauser (c. 1830-1895), also known as Henriette Hausser and nicknamed Citron, was a French actress, courtesan, and artist's model active during the Second Empire. She is widely believed to have posed for Édouard Manet's 1877 painting Nana, one of his most iconic and controversial depictions of modern Parisian femininity. Hauser also performed on stage in both Paris and The Hague, and became a well-known figure in fashionable and artistic circles during the 1860s and 1870s.

== Early life and nickname ==
Hauser was likely born in Paris around 1830. She began her stage career in the early 1860s and gained public attention not only for her acting but also her associations with influential figures of the time. While performing in The Hague, she reportedly became the mistress of the Prince of Orange, the heir to the Dutch throne. This relationship earned her the nickname "Citron", a satirical reference to the prince's title.

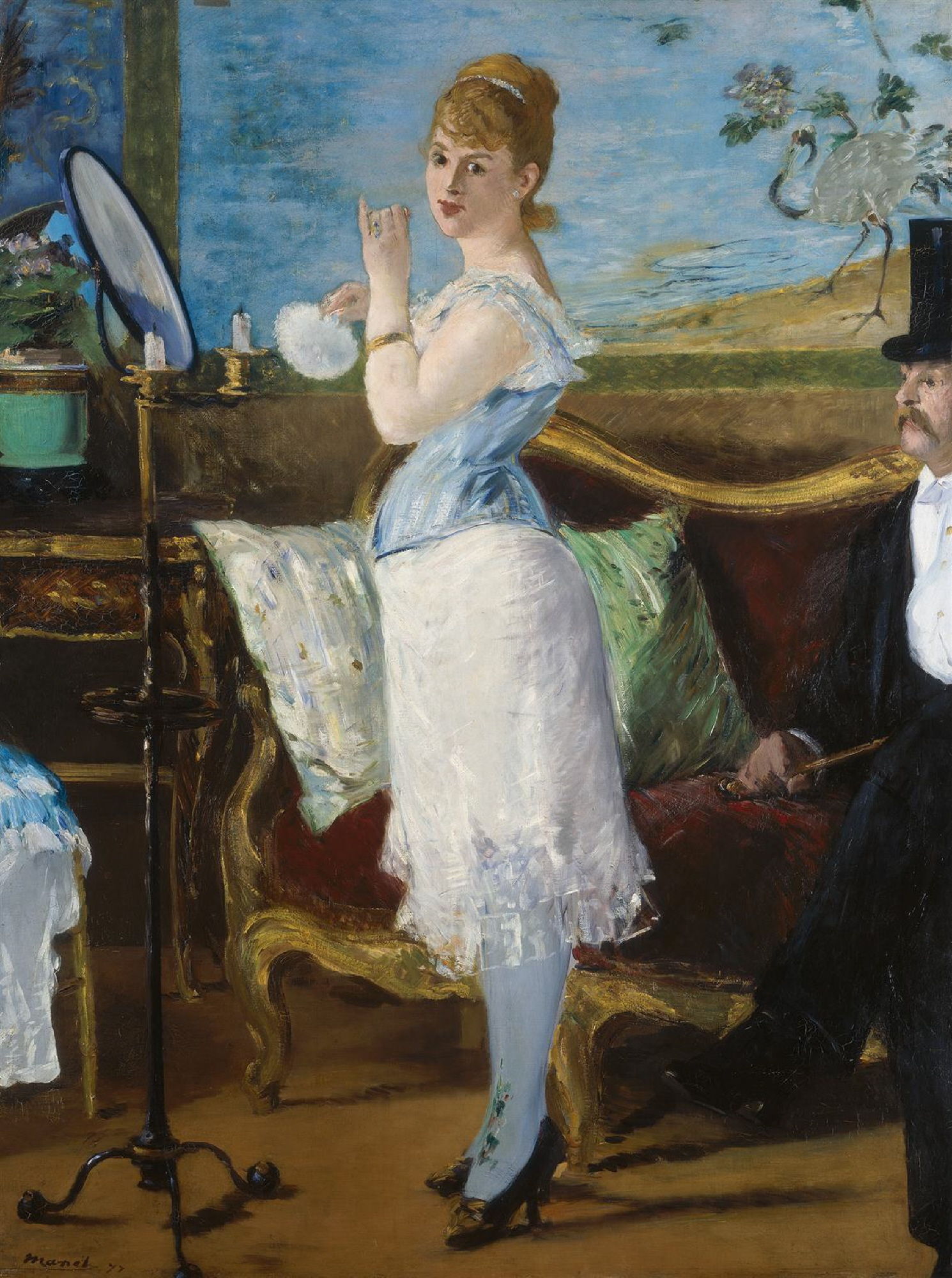
Nana (1877), oil on canvas. Believed to depict Henriette Hauser. Kunsthalle Hamburg.

== Career and modeling ==
Hauser performed regularly at venues such as the Théâtre de la Gaîté and Théâtre Cluny, often appearing in comedic roles alongside her sister Victorine. Her stage presence and appearance made her a recognizable figure in Parisian cultural circles.

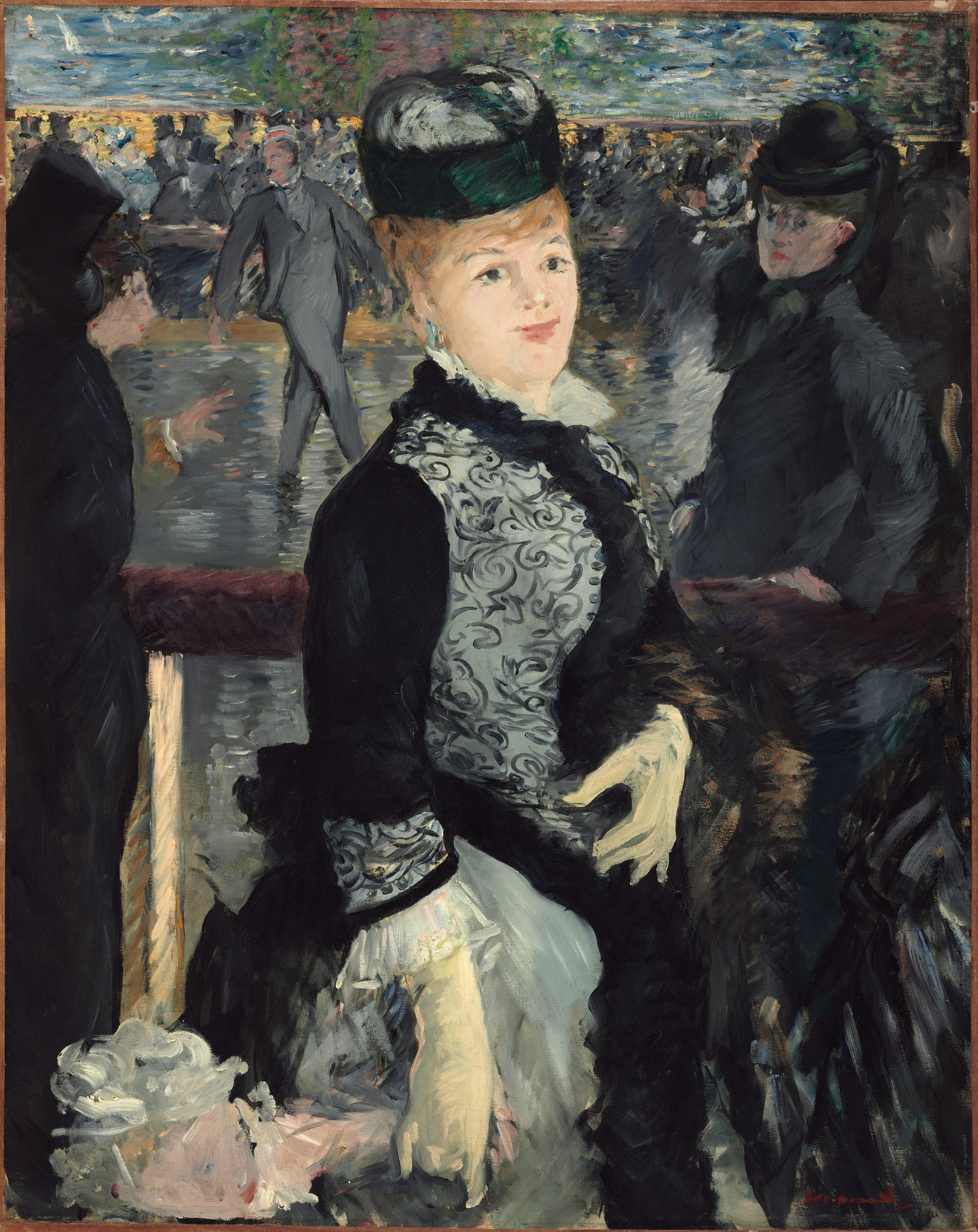
Skating (1877), oil on canvas. Harvard Art Museums.

She is believed to have modeled for several works by Édouard Manet, including Skating (1877), which shows a fashionable woman and child at an ice rink, and most famously, Nana (1877), which depicts a young courtesan standing before a mirror.

In a volume describing the Paris auction scene, art critic Paul Eudel remarked: "Henriette Hauser is someone who has vanished, who posed for most of Manet's paintings)."
