= 1565 in art =

Events from the year 1565 in art.

== Events ==
- September - Titian goes to Cadore to design decorations for the church at Pieve, which will be partly executed by his pupils.
- Before December - Daniele da Volterra begins the work of overpainting nudity in the late Michelangelo's The Last Judgment (Sistine Chapel), earning himself the nickname Il Braghettone ("the breeches maker").

== Works ==
Pieter Bruegel the Elder, The Harvesters, 1565, Metropolitan Museum of Art New York

=== Paintings ===
- Pieter Bruegel the Elder paints
  - the cycle of the seasons
    - The Hunters in the Snow (winter) in the Kunsthistorisches Museum.
    - The Gloomy Day (old beginning of the year in March) in the Kunsthistorisches Museum.
    - The Hay Harvest (early summer) in Nelahozeves (Czech Republic).
    - The Harvesters (late summer) in the Metropolitan Museum of Art of New York.
    - The Return of the Herd (autumn) in the Kunsthistorisches Museum.
  - Winter Landscape with Skaters and Bird Trap.
  - Christ and the Woman Taken in Adultery.
- Lucas Cranach the Younger paints the Altarpiece of the Reformers in Dessau.
- Sebastiano Filippi (Bastianino) paints Birth of the Virgin.
- Tintoretto begins painting the cycle of the life of Christ (completed 1567), including Crucifixion, in the Sala dell'Albergo (Hall of the Hostel) at the Scuola di San Rocco in Venice.
- Titian paints
  - The Penitent Magdalene.
  - Venus Blindfolding Cupid at about this date.
- Giorgio Vasari paints the frescoes on the walls of the Palazzo Vecchio representing scenes of the Austrian Habsburg estates.
- Paolo Veronese paints the Allegory of Virtue and Vice and Wisdom and Strength in Venice, Italy.

== Births ==
- May 15 - Hendrick de Keyser, Dutch sculptor and architect (died 1621)
- June 2 - Francisco Ribalta, Spanish painter, mostly of religious subjects (died 1628)
- date unknown
  - Bernardino Cesari, Italian painter (died 1621)
  - Camillo Mariani, Italian sculptor of the early Baroque (died 1611)
  - Konoe Nobutada, Momoyama period Japanese poet, calligrapher, painter and diarist (died 1614)
  - Isaac Oliver, French-born English portrait miniature painter (died 1617)
  - Jan Saenredam, Dutch engraver (died 1607)
  - Decio Termisani, Naples-born Italian painter (died 1600)
- probable
  - Reza Abbasi, Persian miniaturist, painter and calligrapher of the Isfahan School (died 1635)
  - Achille Calici, Italian painter (died unknown)
  - Cheng Jiasui, Chinese landscape painter and poet during the Ming Dynasty (died 1643)
  - Jacob de Gheyn II, Dutch painter and engraver (died 1629)

== Deaths ==
- date unknown
  - Antonio Begarelli ("Begarino"), Italian sculptor (born 1499)
  - Antonio Bernieri, Italian painter, pupil of Correggio (born 1516)
  - Bernardino Licinio, Italian painter (born c.1489)
  - Pietro Negroni, Italian painter (born c.1505)
  - Paolo Pino, Italian painter and art writer (born 1534)
  - Joseph Weiß, Germain painter (born c.1486)
- probable - Garcia Fernandes, Portuguese Renaissance painter (born unknown)
