= Solaris (1972 film) =

1972 science fiction film by Andrei Tarkovsky

Солярис Solaris
- Theatrical release poster
- Directed by: Andrei Tarkovsky
- Screenplay by: Friedrich Gorenstein; Andrei Tarkovsky
- Based on: Solaris by Stanisław Lem
- Produced by: Vyacheslav Tarasov
- Starring: Donatas Banionis; Natalya Bondarchuk; Jüri Järvet; Vladislav Dvorzhetsky; Nikolai Grinko; Anatoly Solonitsyn
- Cinematography: Vadim Yusov
- Edited by: Lyudmila Feiginova
- Music by: Eduard Artemyev
- Production company: Mosfilm
- Release date: February 5, 1972 (Moscow)
- Running time: 166 minutes
- Country: Soviet Union
- Languages: Russian; German

Solaris (Russian: Солярис, romanized: Solyaris) is a 1972 Soviet science fiction and psychological horror film based on Stanisław Lem's 1961 novel of the same title. The film was co-written and directed by Andrei Tarkovsky, and stars Donatas Banionis and Natalya Bondarchuk. The electronic music score was performed by Eduard Artemyev and the film also features a composition by J.S. Bach as its main theme. The plot centers on a space station orbiting the fictional planet Solaris, where a scientific mission has stalled because the skeleton crew of three scientists have fallen into emotional crises. Psychologist Kris Kelvin (Banionis) travels to the station to evaluate the situation, only to encounter the same mysterious phenomena as the others.

Solaris won the Grand Prix Spécial du Jury at the 1972 Cannes Film Festival and was nominated for the Palme d'Or. It received critical acclaim, and is often cited as one of the greatest science fiction films in the history of cinema. The film was Tarkovsky's attempt to bring greater emotional depth to science fiction films; he viewed most Western works in the genre, including the recently released 2001: A Space Odyssey (1968), as shallow due to their focus on technological innovation. Some of the ideas Tarkovsky expresses in this film are further developed in his film Stalker (1979).

== Plot ==
Psychologist Kris Kelvin is about to be sent on an interstellar journey to evaluate whether a decades-old space station, positioned over the oceanic planet Solaris, should continue its research. He spends his last day on Earth with his elderly father and a retired pilot named Burton. Years earlier, Burton had been part of an exploratory team at Solaris but was recalled when he described strange happenings, including seeing a four-meter-tall child on the surface of the water on the planet. A panel of scientists and military personnel dismissed these visions as hallucinations, but now that the remaining crew members are making similarly strange reports, Kelvin's skills are needed. After leaving the house, Burton tells Kelvin that he recognized the child's face as that of one who was orphaned due to the disappearance of one of the Solaris explorers.

Upon his arrival at the Solaris research station, he finds it in disarray. He soon learns that his friend among the scientists, Dr. Gibarian, has killed himself. The two surviving crewmen—Snaut and Sartorius—are erratic. Kelvin also catches fleeting glimpses of others aboard the station who were not part of the original crew. He finds that Gibarian left him a rambling, cryptic farewell video message, warning him about the strange things happening at the station. The video shows two appearances of a little girl who should not be aboard the station, with Gibarian asking Kelvin if he has seen her and insisting he is not insane, and should strange things happen to Kelvin, it will not be Kelvin having gone insane.

After a fitful sleep, Kelvin is shocked to find Hari, his wife who died ten years earlier, sitting in his sleeping quarters. She is unaware of how she got there. Terrified by her presence, Kelvin launches the replica of his wife into outer space. Snaut explains that the "visitors" or "guests" began appearing after the scientists conducted radiation experiments, directing X-rays at the swirling surface of the planet in a desperate attempt to understand its nature.

That evening, Hari reappears in Kelvin's quarters. This time, he calmly accepts her and they fall asleep together in an embrace. Hari panics when Kelvin briefly leaves her alone in the room, and injures herself attempting to break through the door. But before Kelvin can give first aid, her injuries spontaneously heal before his eyes. Sartorius and Snaut explain to Kelvin that Solaris created Hari from his memories of her. The Hari present among them, though not human, thinks and feels as though she were. Sartorius theorizes that the visitors, also called "guests", are not composed of atoms like regular humans, but are made of neutrinos, and that it might still be possible to destroy them through use of a device known as "the annihilator". Later, Snaut proposes beaming Kelvin's brainwave patterns at Solaris in hopes that it will understand them and stop the disturbing apparitions.

In time, Hari becomes more human and independent and is able to exist away from Kelvin's presence without panicking. She learns from Sartorius that the original Hari had taken her own life ten years earlier. Sartorius, Snaut, Kelvin and Hari gather together for a birthday party, which evolves into a philosophical argument, during which Sartorius reminds Hari that she is not real. Distressed, Hari kills herself again by drinking liquid oxygen, only to painfully resurrect after a few minutes. On the surface of Solaris, the ocean begins to swirl faster into a funnel.

Kelvin falls ill and goes to sleep. He dreams of his mother as a young woman, washing away dirt or scabs from his arm. When he awakens, Hari is gone; Snaut reads her farewell note, in which she explains how she petitioned the two scientists to destroy her with the "annihilator" device. Snaut then tells Kelvin that since broadcasting Kelvin's brainwaves into Solaris, the visitors have stopped appearing and islands have started forming on the planet's surface. Kelvin debates whether to return to Earth or remain on the station.

Kelvin appears to be at the family home seen at the beginning of the film. He sinks to his knees and embraces his father. The camera slowly cranes away to reveal that they are on a Solaris island.

== Cast ==
- Donatas Banionis as Kris Kelvin (voiced by Vladimir Zamansky)
  - Raimundas Banionis as young Kelvin
- Natalya Bondarchuk as Hari
- Jüri Järvet as Dr. Snaut (voiced by Vladimir Tatosov)
- Vladislav Dvorzhetsky as Henri Burton
- Nikolai Grinko as Kelvin's Father
- Olga Barnet as Kelvin's Mother
- Anatoly Solonitsyn as Dr. Sartorius
- Sos Sargsyan as Dr. Gibarian
- Aleksandr Misharin as Commissioner Shanahan
- Bagrat Oganesyan as Professor Tarkhe
- Tamara Ogorodnikova as Anna, Kelvin's Aunt
- Tatyana Malykh as Kelvin's Niece
- Vitalik Kerdimun as Burton's Son
- Yulian Semyonov as Conference Chairman
- Olga Kizilova as Dr. Gibarian's guest
- Georgiy Teykh as Professor Messenger

== Production ==
=== Writing ===
In 1968 the director Andrei Tarkovsky had several motives for cinematically adapting Stanisław Lem's science fiction novel Solaris (1961). First, he admired Lem's work. Second, he needed work and money, because his previous film, Andrei Rublev (1966), had gone unreleased, and his screenplay A White, White Day had been rejected (in 1975, it was realised as Mirror). A film of a novel by Lem, a popular and critically respected writer in the USSR, was a logical commercial and artistic choice. Another inspiration was Tarkovsky's desire to bring emotional depth to the science fiction genre, which he regarded as shallow due to its focus on technological invention; in a 1970 interview, he singled out Stanley Kubrick's 1968 film 2001: A Space Odyssey as "phoney on many points" and "a lifeless schema with only pretensions to truth".

Tarkovsky and Lem collaborated and remained in communication about the adaptation. With Friedrich Gorenstein, Tarkovsky co-wrote the first screenplay in the summer of 1969; two-thirds of it occurred on Earth. The Mosfilm committee disliked it, and Lem became furious over the drastic alteration of his novel. The final screenplay yielded the shooting script, which has less action on Earth and deletes Kelvin's marriage to his second wife, Maria, from the story. In the novel Lem describes science's inadequacy in allowing humans to communicate with an alien life form, because certain forms, at least, of sentient extra-terrestrial life may operate well outside of human experience and understanding. In the movie, Tarkovsky concentrates on Kelvin's feelings for his wife, Hari, and the impact of outer space exploration on the human condition. Dr. Gibarian's monologue (from the novel's sixth chapter) is the highlight of the final library scene, wherein Snaut says: "We don't need other worlds. We need mirrors". Unlike the novel, which begins with Kelvin's spaceflight and takes place entirely on Solaris, the film shows Kelvin's visit to his parents' house in the country before leaving Earth. The contrast establishes the worlds in which he lives – a vibrant Earth versus an austere, closed-in space station orbiting Solaris – demonstrating and questioning space exploration's impact on the human psyche.

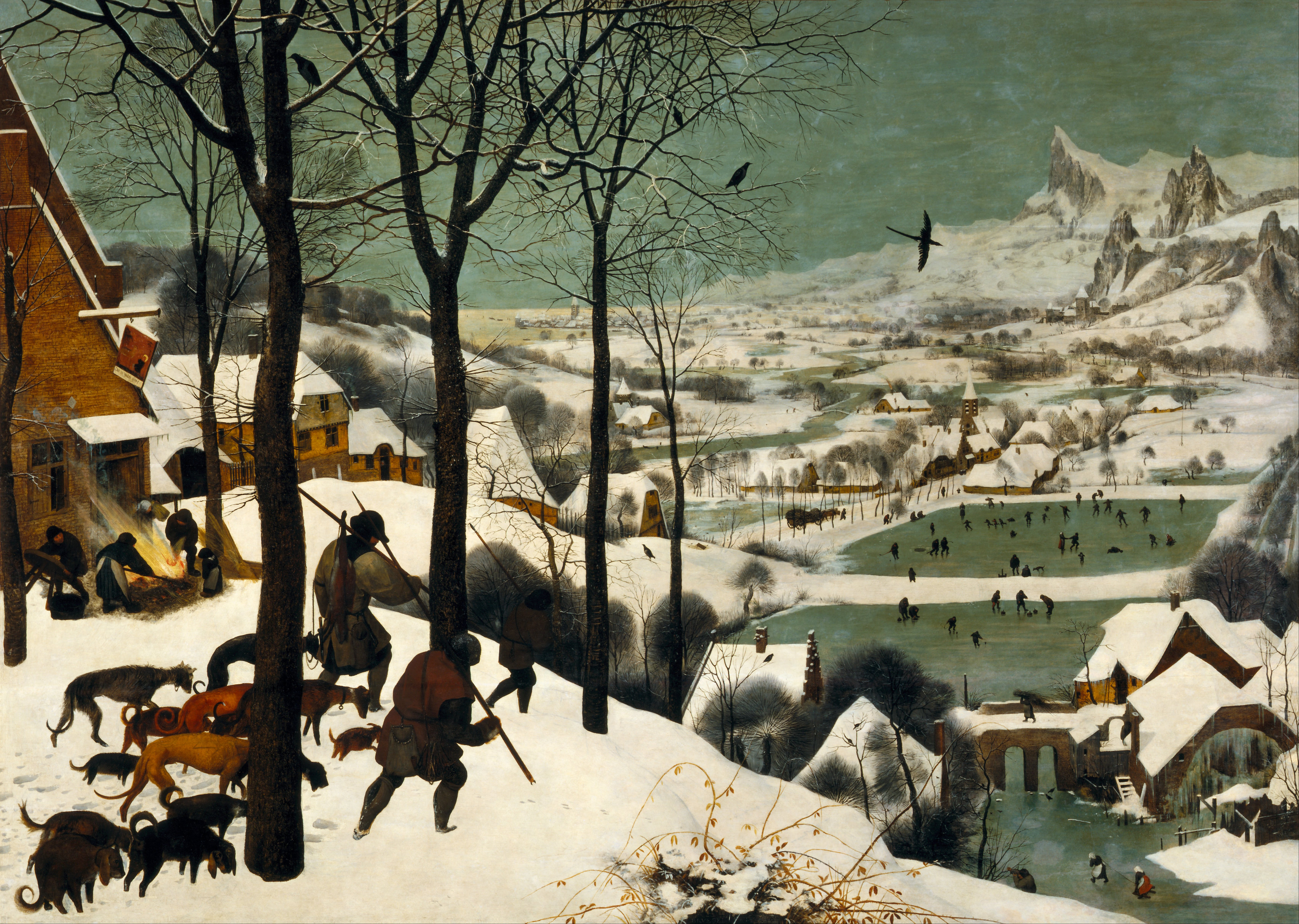
A detail of The Hunters in the Snow (1565) by Pieter Bruegel the Elder, a thematic reference

The set design of Solaris features paintings by the Old Masters. The interior of the space station is decorated with full reproductions of the 1565 painting cycle of The Months (The Hunters in the Snow, The Gloomy Day, The Hay Harvest, The Harvesters, and The Return of the Herd), by Pieter Bruegel the Elder, and details of Landscape with the Fall of Icarus and The Hunters in the Snow (1565). The scene of Kelvin kneeling before his father and the father embracing him alludes to The Return of the Prodigal Son (1669) by Rembrandt. The references and allusions are Tarkovsky's efforts to give the young art of cinema historical perspective, to evoke the viewer's feeling that cinema is a mature art.

The film references Tarkovsky's 1966 film Andrei Rublev, as an icon by Andrei Rublev is present in Kelvin's room. It is the second of a series of three films referencing Rublev, the last being Tarkovsky's next film Mirror, which was released in 1975 and references Andrei Rublev by having a poster of the film hung on a wall.

=== Casting ===
Tarkovsky initially wanted his ex-wife, Irma Raush, to play Hari, but after meeting actress Bibi Andersson in June 1970 decided that she was better for the role. Wishing to work with Tarkovsky, Andersson agreed to be paid in roubles. Ultimately, Natalya Bondarchuk, whom Tarkovsky met when they were students at the State Institute of Cinematography, was cast as Hari; Bondarchuk had introduced the novel Solaris to him. Tarkovsky auditioned Bondarchuk in 1970 but decided she was too young for the part. Tarkovsky instead recommended Bondarchuk to director Larisa Shepitko, who cast her in You and Me (1971). Half a year later, Tarkovsky screened You and Me and was so impressed by her performance that he decided to cast Bondarchuk as Hari.

Tarkovsky cast Donatas Banionis as Kelvin, Jüri Järvet as Snaut, Anatoly Solonitsyn as Sartorius, Nikolai Grinko as Kelvin's father, and Olga Barnet as Kelvin's mother. Tarkovsky had already worked with Solonitsyn, who played Andrei Rublev, and with Grinko, who appeared in Andrei Rublev and Ivan's Childhood (1962). Tarkovsky thought Solonitsyn and Grinko would need extra directorial assistance. After filming was almost completed, Tarkovsky ranked the actors and performances thusly: Bondarchuk, Järvet, Solonitsyn, Banionis, Dvorzhetsky, and Grinko; he also wrote in his diary that "Natalya B. has outshone everybody".

=== Filming ===
In the summer of 1970 the State Committee for Cinematography (Goskino SSSR) authorized the production of Solaris, with a length of 4,000 metres (13,123 ft), equivalent to a two-hour-twenty-minute running time. The exteriors were photographed at Zvenigorod, near Moscow; the interiors were photographed at the Mosfilm studios. The scenes of space pilot Burton driving through a city were photographed in September and October 1971 at Akasaka and Iikura in Tokyo. The original plan was to film futuristic structures at the World Expo '70, but the trip was delayed. The shooting began in March 1971 with cinematographer Vadim Yusov, who also photographed Tarkovsky's previous films. They quarreled so much on this film that they never worked together again. Eastman Kodak color film was used to shoot the color scenes, though it had to be specially procured for the production as it was not widely available in the Soviet Union. The first version of Solaris was completed in December 1971.

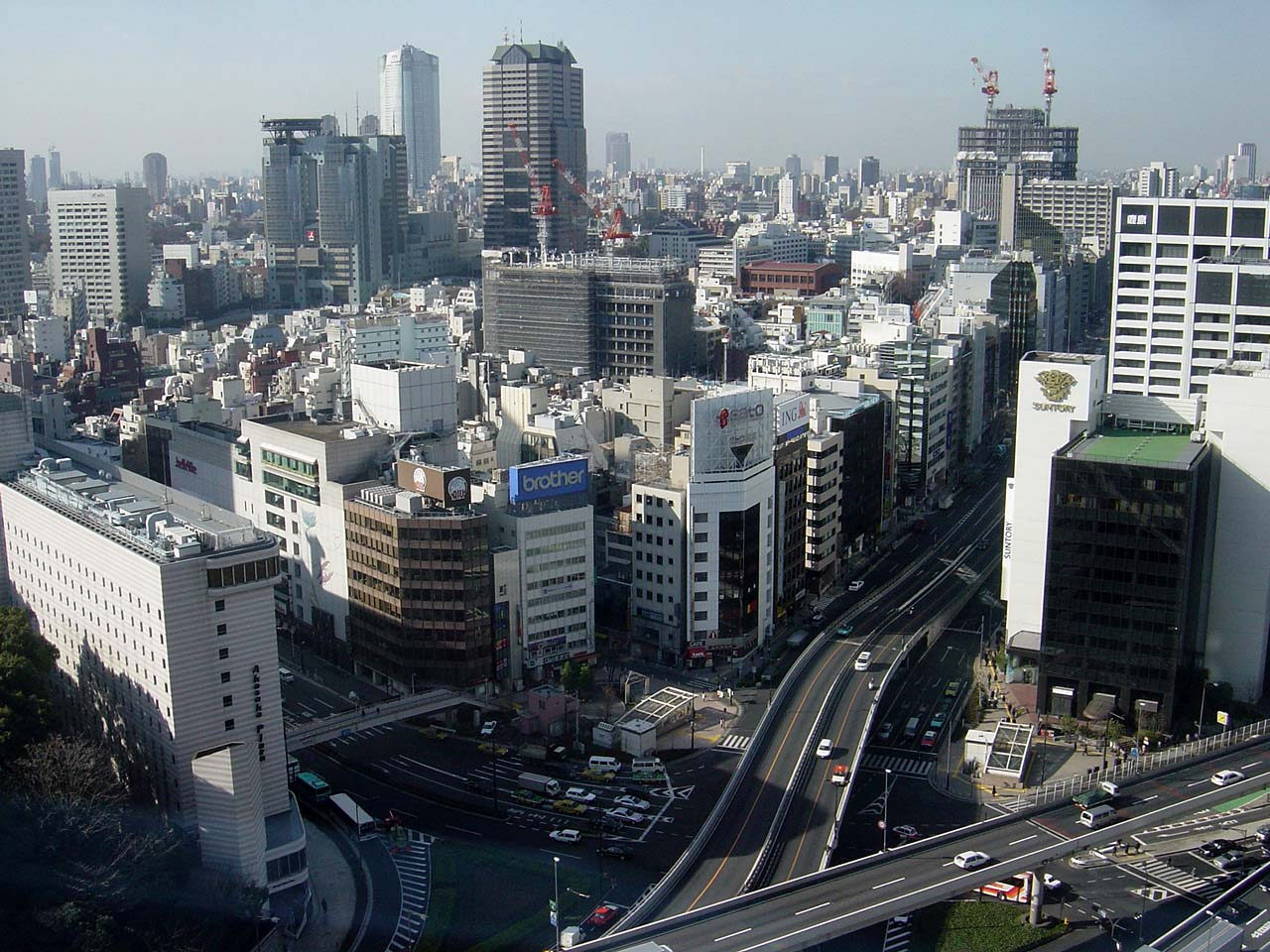
Solaris locale: Akasaka, Tokyo, the future city that space pilot Henri Berton traverses in his car

The Solaris ocean was created with acetone, aluminium powder, and dyes. Mikhail Romadin designed the space station as lived-in, beat-up and decrepit rather than shiny, neat and futuristic. The designer and director consulted with scientist and aerospace engineer Lupichev, who lent them a 1960s-era mainframe computer for set decoration. For some of the sequences, Romadin designed a mirror room that enabled Yusov to hide within a mirrored sphere so as to be invisible in the finished film. Akira Kurosawa, who visited the Mosfilm studios during filming, expressed admiration for the space station design.

In January 1972 the State Committee for Cinematography requested editorial changes before releasing Solaris. Requests included a more realistic film with a clearer image of the future and deletion of allusions to God and Christianity. Tarkovsky successfully resisted such major changes, and after a few minor edits Solaris was approved for release in March 1972.

=== Music ===
The soundtrack of Solaris features Johann Sebastian Bach's chorale prelude for organ Ich ruf' zu dir, Herr Jesu Christ, BWV 639, played by Leonid Roizman, and an electronic score by Eduard Artemyev. The prelude is the central musical theme. Tarkovsky initially wanted the film to be devoid of music and asked Artemyev to orchestrate ambient sounds as the score; the latter proposed subtly introducing orchestral music. The classical music used for Earth's theme stands in counterpoint to the fluid electronic music used as the theme for the planet Solaris. The character Hari has her own subtheme, a cantus firmus based on Bach's music featuring Artemyev's music atop it; it is heard at Hari's death and at the story's end.

== Reception and influence ==
Solaris premiered at the 1972 Cannes Film Festival, where it won the Grand Prix Spécial du Jury and was nominated for the Palme d'Or. In the USSR, the film premiered in the Mir film theater in Moscow on February 5, 1973. Tarkovsky did not consider the Mir cinema the best projection venue. The film sold 10.5 million tickets.

Unlike the vast majority of commercial and ideological films in the 1970s, Solaris screened in the USSR in a limited run for 15 years. Solaris premiered later in the Eastern Bloc and in the West. Upon exhibition in the United States, the film, truncated by 30 minutes, premiered at the Ziegfeld Theatre in New York City on October 6, 1976.

=== Critical response ===
Film critic Roger Ebert reviewed the 1976 release for The Chicago Sun-Times, giving three out of four stars and writing, "Solaris isn't a fast-moving action picture; it's a thoughtful, deep, sensitive movie that uses the freedom of science fiction to examine human nature. It starts slow, but once you get involved, it grows on you.' Ebert added Solaris to his Great Movies list in 2003, saying he had initially "balked" at its length and pacing but later came to admire Tarkovsky's goals. "No director makes greater demands on our patience. Yet his admirers are passionate and they have reason for their feelings: Tarkovsky consciously tried to create art that was great and deep. He held to a romantic view of the individual able to transform reality through his own spiritual and philosophical strength." Ebert later compared the 2011 film Another Earth to Solaris, writing that Another Earth "is as thought-provoking, in a less profound way, as Tarkovsky's Solaris, another film about a sort of parallel Earth". Ebert and Jonathan Rosenbaum also noted Solaris's influence on the 1997 film Event Horizon.

Since garnering further acclaim, the film has a rating of 92% on Rotten Tomatoes based on 66 reviews, with an average rating of 8.90/10. The consensus states: "Solaris is a haunting, meditative film that uses sci-fi to raise complex questions about humanity and existence." It has a score of 93 out of 100 on Metacritic, based on eight critics. In 2018, the film ranked 57th on the BBC's list of the 100 greatest foreign-language films, as voted on by 209 film critics from 43 countries. A list of "The 100 Best Films of World Cinema" Empire magazine compiled in 2010 ranked Tarkovsky's Solaris at No. 68.

=== Retrospective response ===
Salman Rushdie has called Solaris "a sci-fi masterpiece", adding, "This exploration of the unreliability of reality and the power of the human unconscious, this great examination of the limits of rationalism and the perverse power of even the most ill-fated love, needs to be seen as widely as possible before it's transformed by Steven Soderbergh and James Cameron into what they ludicrously threaten will be 2001 meets Last Tango in Paris. What, sex in space with floating butter? Tarkovsky must be turning over in his grave." In her 1997 article "Identifying Fears", M. Galina called Solaris "one of the biggest events in Soviet science fiction cinema" and one of few that do not now seem anachronistic. Japanese filmmaker Akira Kurosawa cited Solaris as one of his favorite films. Adam Curtis' documentary film Bitter Lake (2015) features scenes from Solaris. Its influence on Christopher Nolan's Inception (2010) was noted.

Although Lem worked with Tarkovsky and Friedrich Gorenstein to develop the screenplay, he maintained he "never really liked Tarkovsky's version" of his novel. Tarkovsky wanted a film based on the novel but artistically independent of it, while Lem opposed any divergence of the screenplay from the novel. Lem went as far as to say that Tarkovsky made Crime and Punishment rather than Solaris, omitting epistemological and cognitive aspects of his book. But Lem also said in an interview that he had only seen part of the finale, much later, after Tarkovsky's death. Tarkovsky claimed that Lem did not fully appreciate cinema and expected the film to merely illustrate the novel without creating an original cinematic piece; Tarkovsky's film is about the inner lives of its characters while Lem's novel is about the conflicts of man's condition in nature and the nature of man in the universe. For Tarkovsky, Lem's exposition of that existential conflict was the starting point for depicting the characters' inner lives. In the autobiographical documentary Voyage in Time (1983), Tarkovsky says he viewed Solaris as an artistic failure because it did not transcend genre as he believed his film Stalker (1979) did, due to the required technological dialogue and special effects.

In an example of life imitating art, Bondarchuk revealed in a 2010 interview that she fell in love with Tarkovsky while filming Solaris and, after their relationship ended, became suicidal. She said her decision was partly influenced by her role.

=== Home media ===
Solaris was released on LaserDisc in Japan in 1986.

Like many other films by Tarkovsky, it was initially released on DVD by Ruscico in 2000. The film is split onto two discs and contains a newly-mixed 5.1 surround sound track, optional voice-overs in English and French, and subtitles in thirteen different languages. In addition to the release being all-region, the contents of the discs have been licensed to various international distributors, including Artificial Eye in the U.K., MK2 in France, Llamentol in Spain, and Shock Records in Australia. In Italy, a separate DVD was released by 20th Century Fox Home Entertainment in 2001 that featured its own restoration, as well as an Italian dub.

The Criterion Collection released the film on DVD in North America on 26 November 2002. It is a two-disc set, with the first disc containing the feature alongside an audio essay by Vida Johnson and Graham Petrie (co-authors of The Films of Tarkovsky: A Visual Fugue). On May 24, 2011, they released it on Blu-ray Disc in North America, alongside a DVD re-release. The most noticeable difference from their previous DVD release was that the blue and white tinted monochrome scenes from the film were restored. However, whereas the original DVD is region-free, the second DVD is locked to region 1. Criterion also released it in 2017 in the U.K.

== Legacy ==
Steven Soderbergh directed a 2002 adaptation of Solaris for American audiences, starring George Clooney. It received mixed to positive reviews from critics and underperformed at the box office.

The 1972 film was selected for screening as part of the Cannes Classics section at the 2016 Cannes Film Festival.

== See also ==
- List of films featuring space stations
- Cinema of the Soviet Union
- Ocean world
