= The Census at Bethlehem =

Painting by Pieter Bruegel the Elder

- Artist: Pieter Bruegel the Elder
- Year: 1566
- Type: Oil on panel
- Dimensions: 116 cm × 164.5 cm (46 in × 64.8 in)
- Location: Oldmasters Museum, Brussels

The Census at Bethlehem (also known as The Numbering at Bethlehem) is an oil-on-panel painting by the Dutch and Flemish Renaissance painting artist Pieter Bruegel the Elder, painted in 1566. It is signed and measures about 1155 × 1645 mm. It is now in the Oldmasters Museum in Brussels, which acquired it in 1902.

The painting comes from a brief period when Bruegel painted five snowy landscapes (see gallery below), thereby establishing a genre of winter landscapes in Western art. These are firstly the Adoration of the Magi in the Snow, now redated to 1563, becoming the earliest of the group. Unlike the others, this shows snow falling. The year of the Winter Landscape with a Bird Trap, 1565, also produced The Hunters in the Snow, the most famous of the group, part of a series showing the months or seasons. The date of the Massacre of the Innocents is less certain, placed between 1565 and 1567, and The Census at Bethlehem is dated to 1566. The group have often been thought to have been influenced by a sharp decrease in winter temperatures in northern Europe, especially in the very hard winter of 1564/65. Bruegel died in 1569, aged about 44 or less.

This is a rare subject in previous Early Netherlandish art, or indeed any Western art. The ruined castle in the background, at the painting's top right, is based on the towers and gates of Amsterdam.

== Description ==
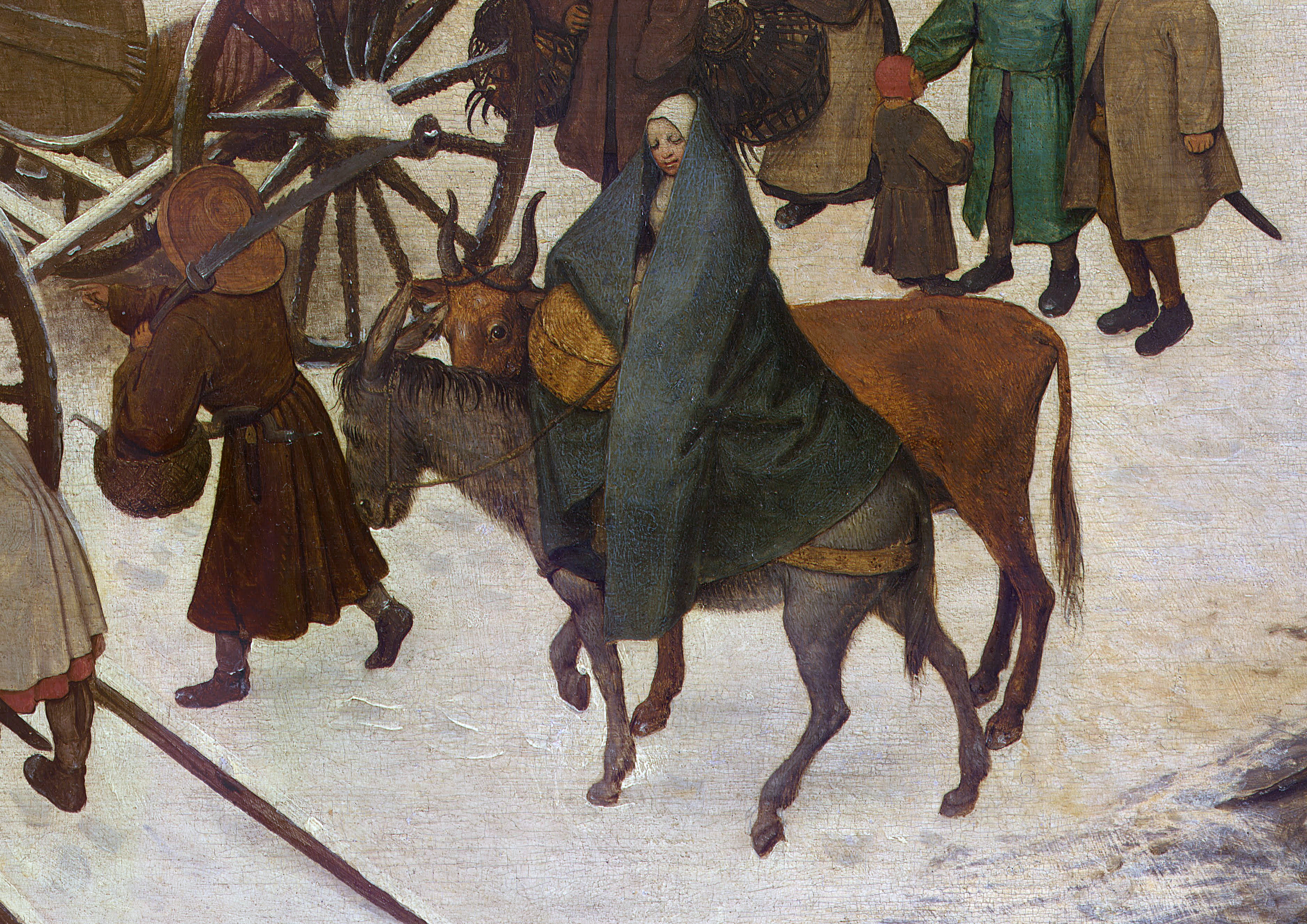
Detail of Mary and Joseph

The painting shows Bethlehem as a Flemish village in winter at sundown. A group of people is gathered at a building on the left, having their details taken down by a scribe. A sign bearing the Habsburg double-headed eagle is visible on the building. Other people are making their way to the same building, including the figures of Joseph and the pregnant Virgin Mary on a donkey. A pig is being slaughtered, though of course such an event would never have occurred in Jewish Bethlehem. People are going about their daily business in the cold, children are shown playing with toys on the ice and having snowball fights.

At the very centre of the painting is a spoked wheel, sometimes interpreted as being a reference to the wheel of fortune. To the right, a man in a small hut is shown holding a clapper, a warning to keep away from leprosy. Leprosy was endemic in that part of Europe when the painting was created. There is a begging bowl in front of the hut. In the background, men drink at a makeshift bar, and in the distance are a well-kept church and a crumbling castle.

As he often did, Bruegel treats a biblical story, here the census of Quirinius, as a contemporary event. And once again, reference to particular political events has been adduced - in this case, the tax paying to the administration in the Netherlands. However, Bruegel may well be making a more general criticism of bureaucratic methods.

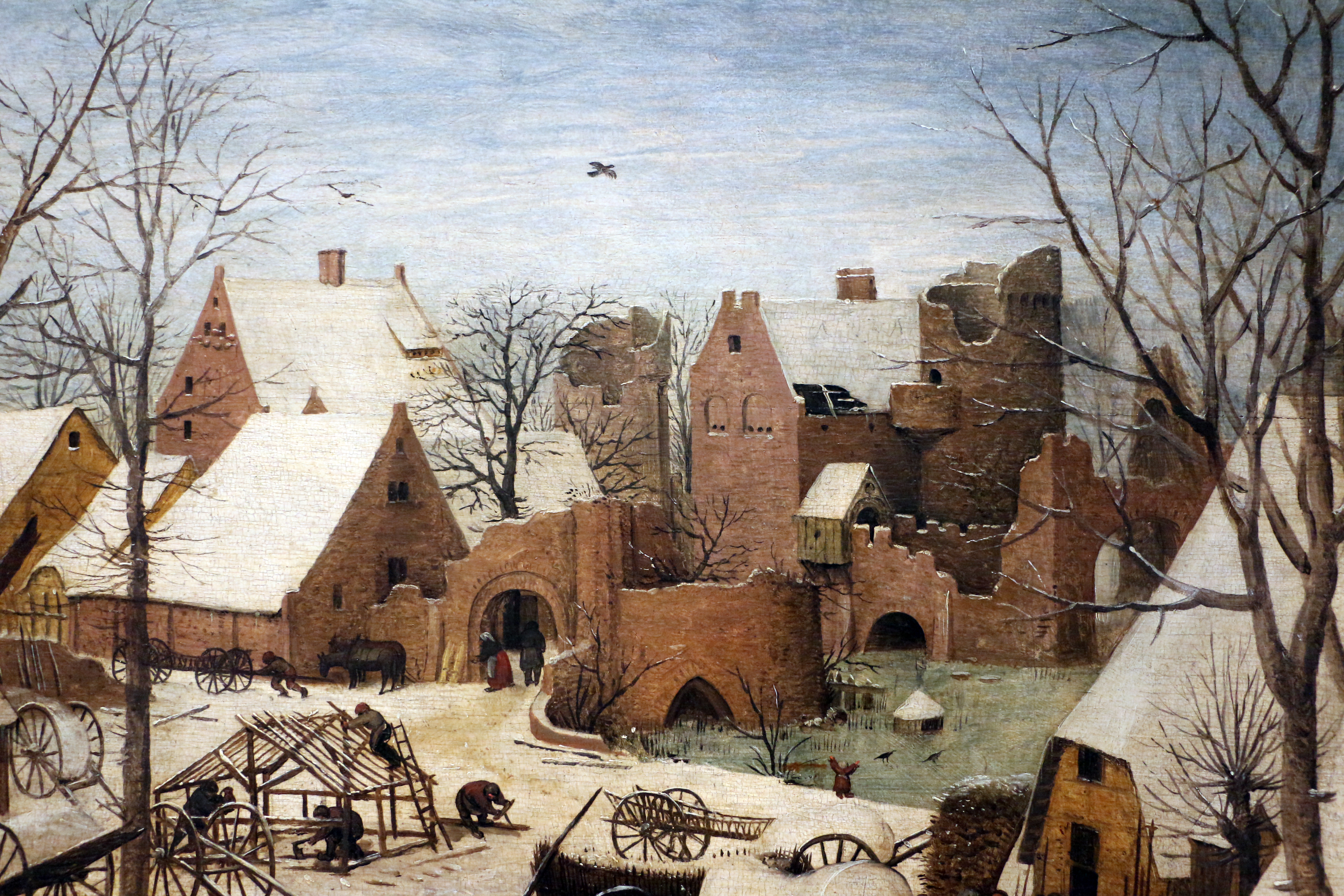
Detail of ruined castle at painting's top right

The events depicted are described in Luke 2, 1-5:

And it came to pass in those days that a decree went out from Caesar Augustus that all the world should be registered... So all went to be registered, everyone to his own city. Joseph also went up from Galilee, out of the city of Nazareth, into Judea, to the city of David, which is called Bethlehem, because he was of the house and lineage of David, to be registered with Mary, his betrothed wife, who was with child.

— Luke 2:1-5, NKJV

== Copies ==
Pieter Brueghel the Younger and his studio made dozens of copies of the painting after his father's death, one of which was sold at auction for $10 million in 2013. Another copy, dated from 1610, is also in the Oldmasters Museum, in Brussels.

== Bruegel's other snow paintings ==
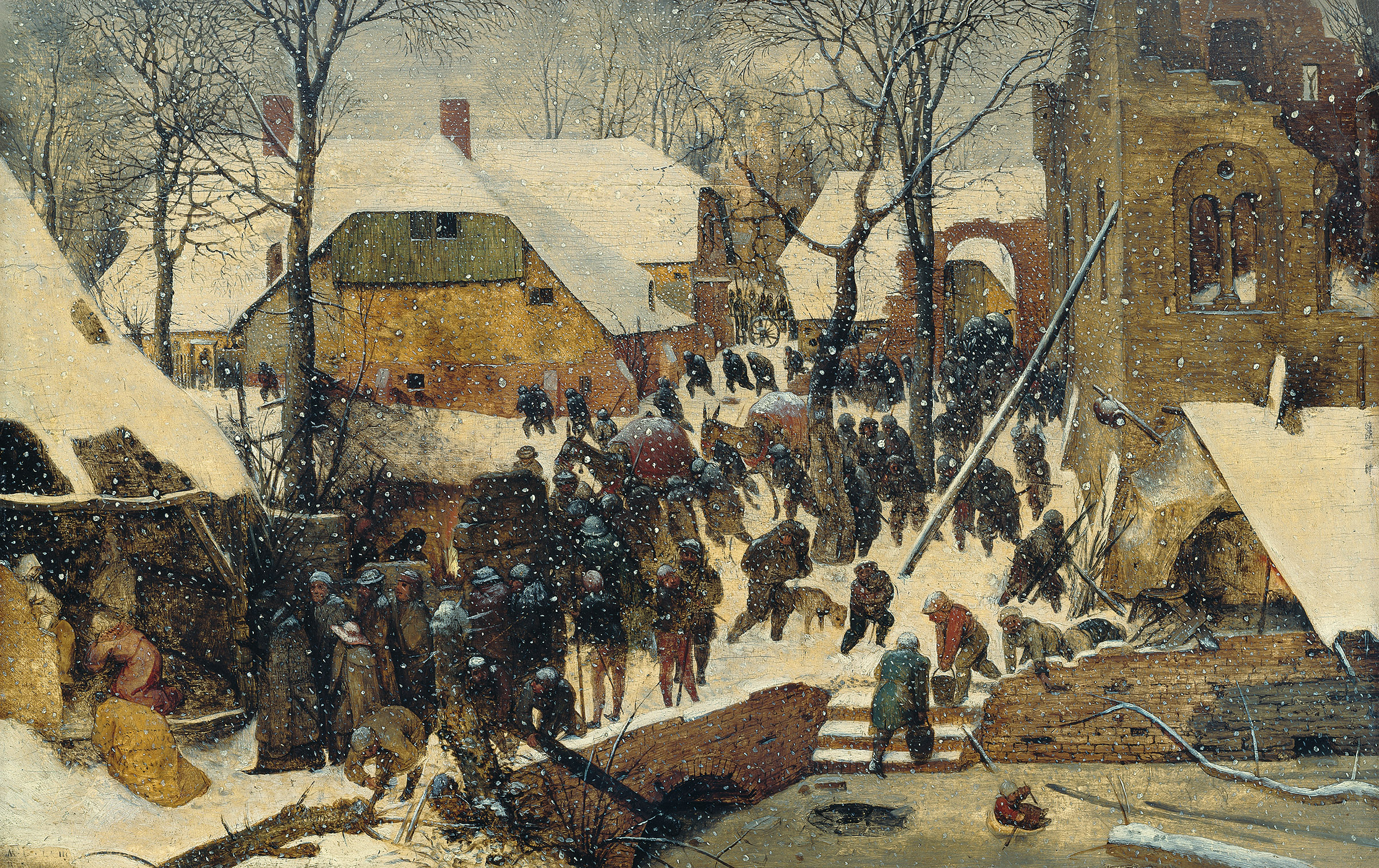
Adoration of the Magi in the Snow (1563)

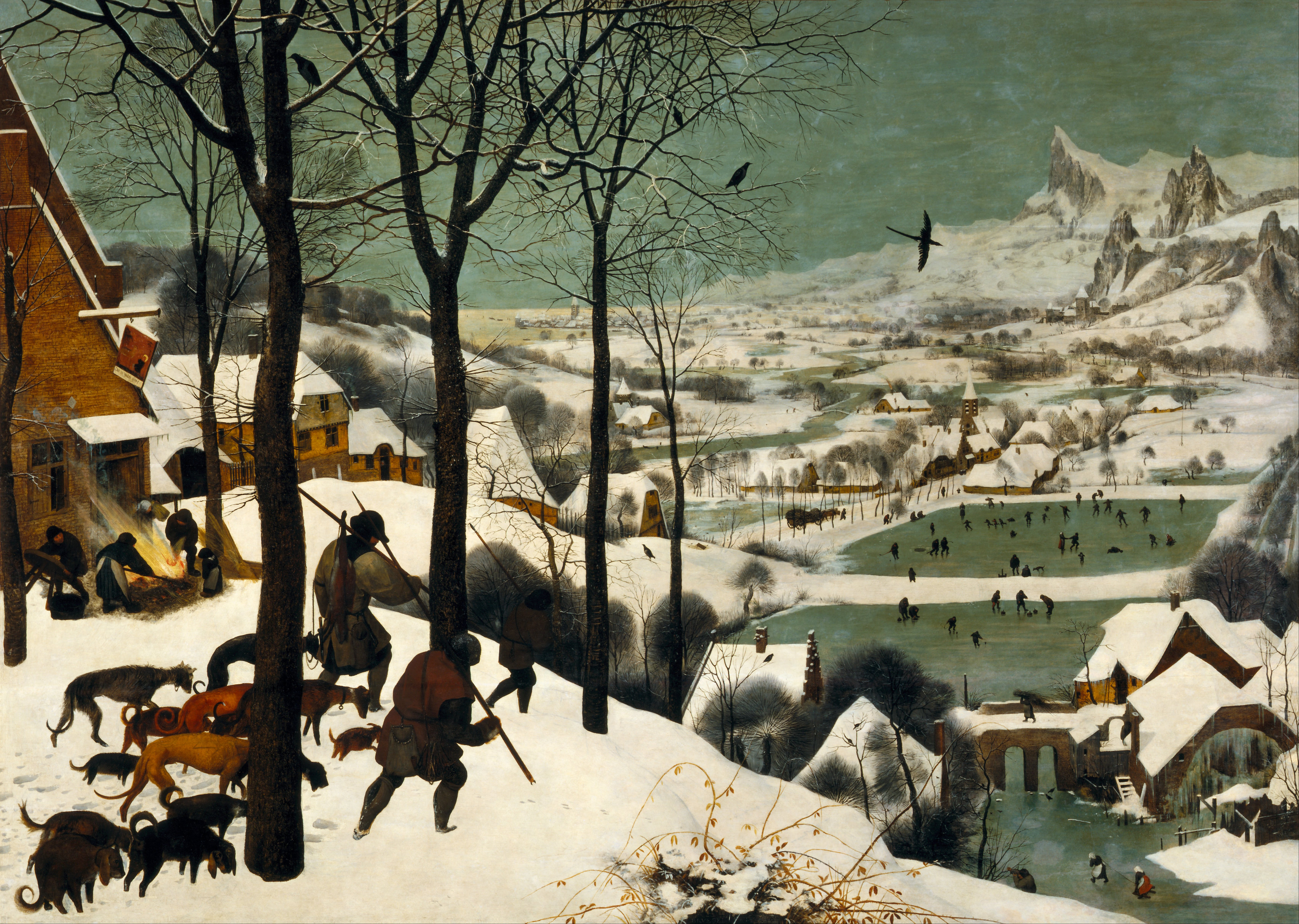
The Hunters in the Snow (1565)

Winter Landscape with Ice skaters and Bird trap (1565)

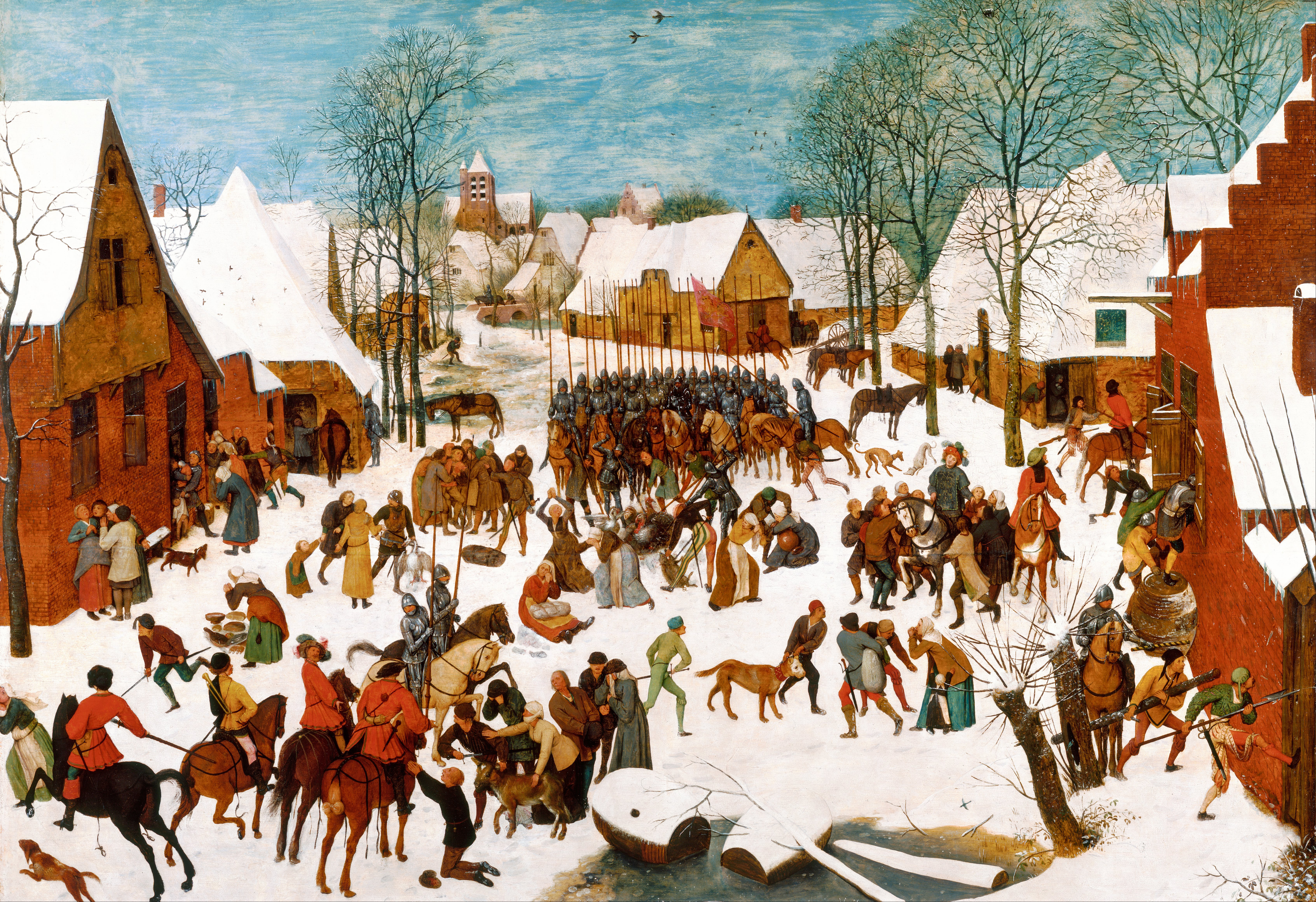
Massacre of the Innocents (c.1565-1567)

== See also ==
- List of paintings by Pieter Bruegel the Elder
