= The Hunters in the Snow =

Painting by Pieter Bruegel the Elder

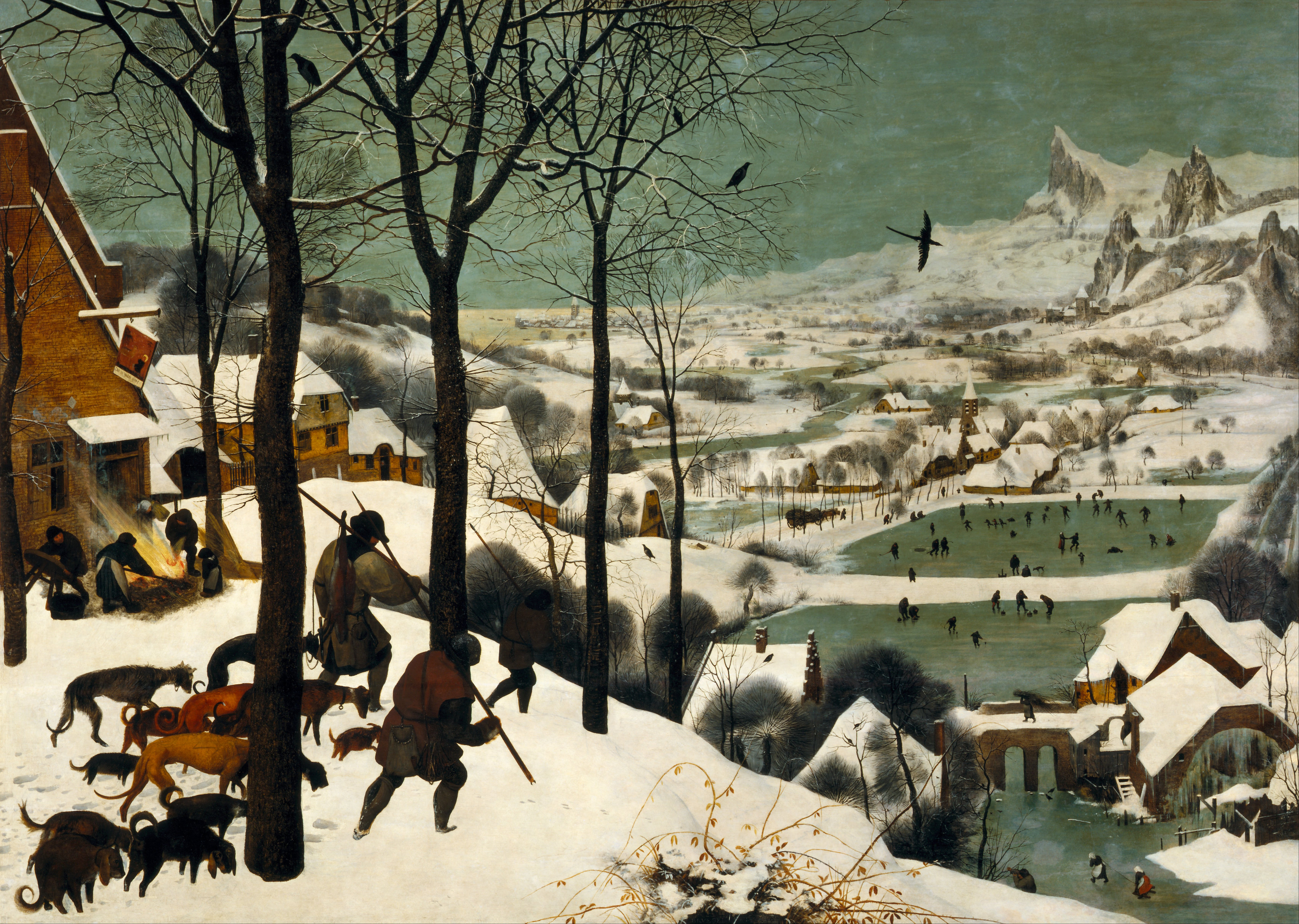
- Artist: Pieter Bruegel the Elder
- Year: 1565
- Type: Oil on panel
- Dimensions: 117 cm × 162 cm (46 in × 63 3/4 in)
- Location: Kunsthistorisches Museum, Vienna

The Hunters in the Snow (Dutch: Jagers in de Sneeuw), also known as The Return of the Hunters, is a 1565 oil-on-wood painting by Pieter Bruegel the Elder. The Northern Renaissance work is one of a series of works, five of which still survive, that depict different times of the year. The painting is in the collection of the Kunsthistorisches Museum in Vienna, Austria. This scene is set in the depths of winter during December/January.

This painting is part of the BBC's 100 Great Paintings.

== Background and origins ==
The Hunters in the Snow, and the series to which it belongs, are in the medieval and early Renaissance tradition of the Labours of the Months: depictions of various rural activities and work understood by a spectator in Bruegel's time as representing the different months or times of the year. For in 1565, this was the beginning of upcoming harsh winters, called the Little Ice Age.

== Description and composition ==
The painting shows a wintry scene in which three hunters are returning from an expedition accompanied by their dogs. By appearances the outing was not successful; the hunters appear to trudge wearily, and the dogs, rather lean and gaunt, seem to share the hunters' weariness. One man carries the "meager corpse of a fox" illustrating the paucity of the hunt. In front of the hunters in the snow are the footprints of a hare—which has escaped or been missed by the hunters. The overall visual impression is one of a calm, cold, overcast day; the colors are muted whites and grays, the trees are bare of leaves, and wood smoke hangs in the air. Several adults and a child prepare to singe a pig at an inn with an outside fire. There is a sign just above the entrance of the inn that is nearly detaching from its hardware. The sign reads "Dit Is Gu(l)den Hert" ("This is the Golden Hart" ie "deer"; the letter "l" is abraded) and represents the vision of Saint Hubertus, or of Saint Eustace, patron saint of the hunters. Of interest are the jagged mountain peaks which do not exist in the Low Countries.

The painting prominently depicts crows sitting in the denuded trees and a magpie flies in the upper centre of the scene. Bruegel sometimes uses these two species of birds to indicate an ill-omen as in Dutch culture magpies are associated with the Devil.

The landscape itself is a flat-bottomed valley (a river meanders through it) with jagged peaks visible on the far side. A watermill is seen with its wheel frozen stiff. In the distance, figures ice skate, play a forerunner of bandy or ice hockey, kolf, and play eisstock ("ice-stick", similar to curling) on a frozen lake; they are rendered as silhouettes.

== Interpretation and reception ==
External videos
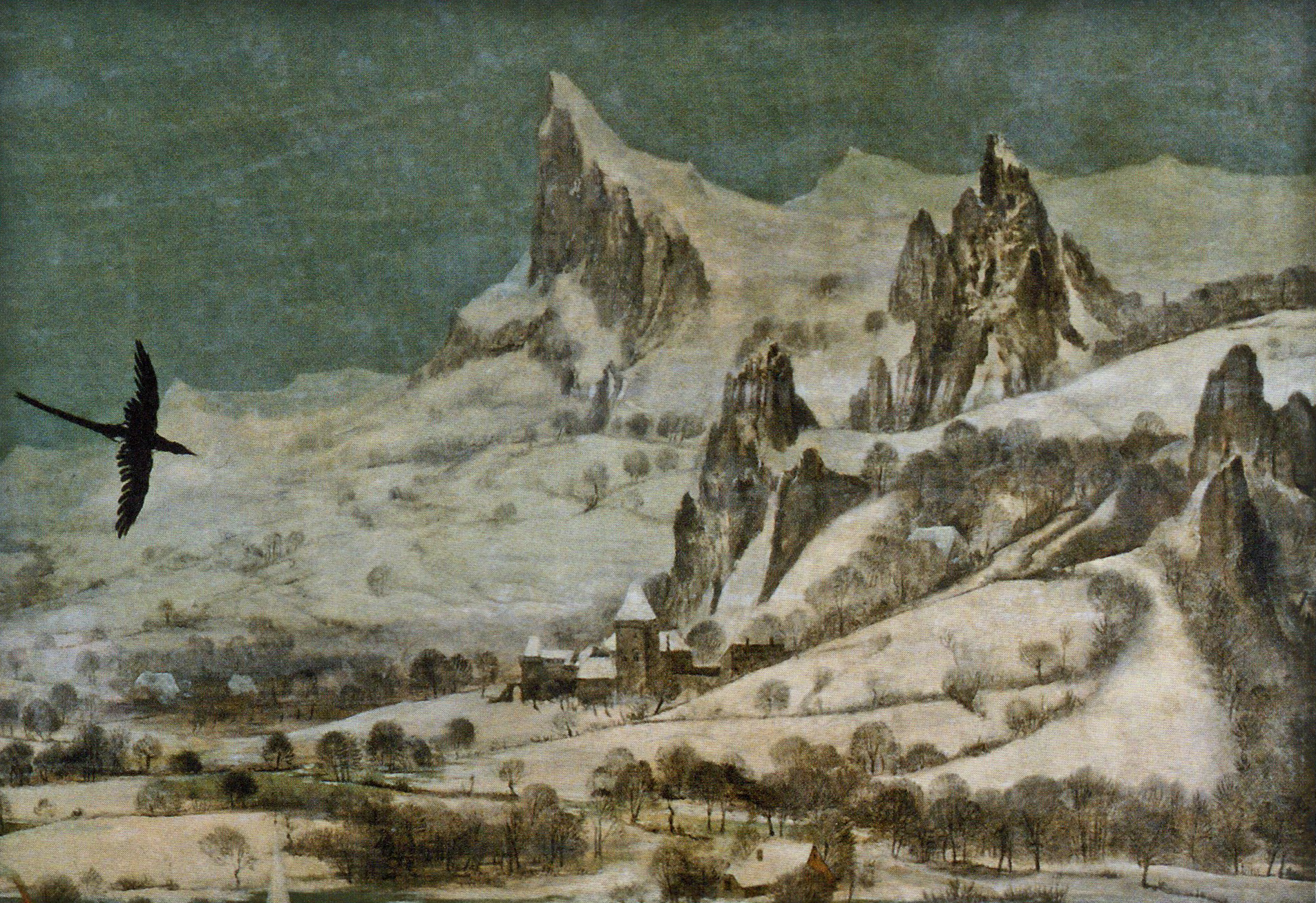
- Pieter Bruegel the Elder, Hunters in the Snow (Winter), 1565, Smarthistory

Writing in the "opinion" section of Nature, art historian Martin Kemp points out that Old Masters are popular subjects for Christmas cards and states that "probably no 'secular' subject is more popular than ... Hunters in the Snow". The painting is the subject of modernist poet William Carlos Williams's ekphrastic poem "The Hunter in the Snow".

The surviving Months of the Year cycle are:

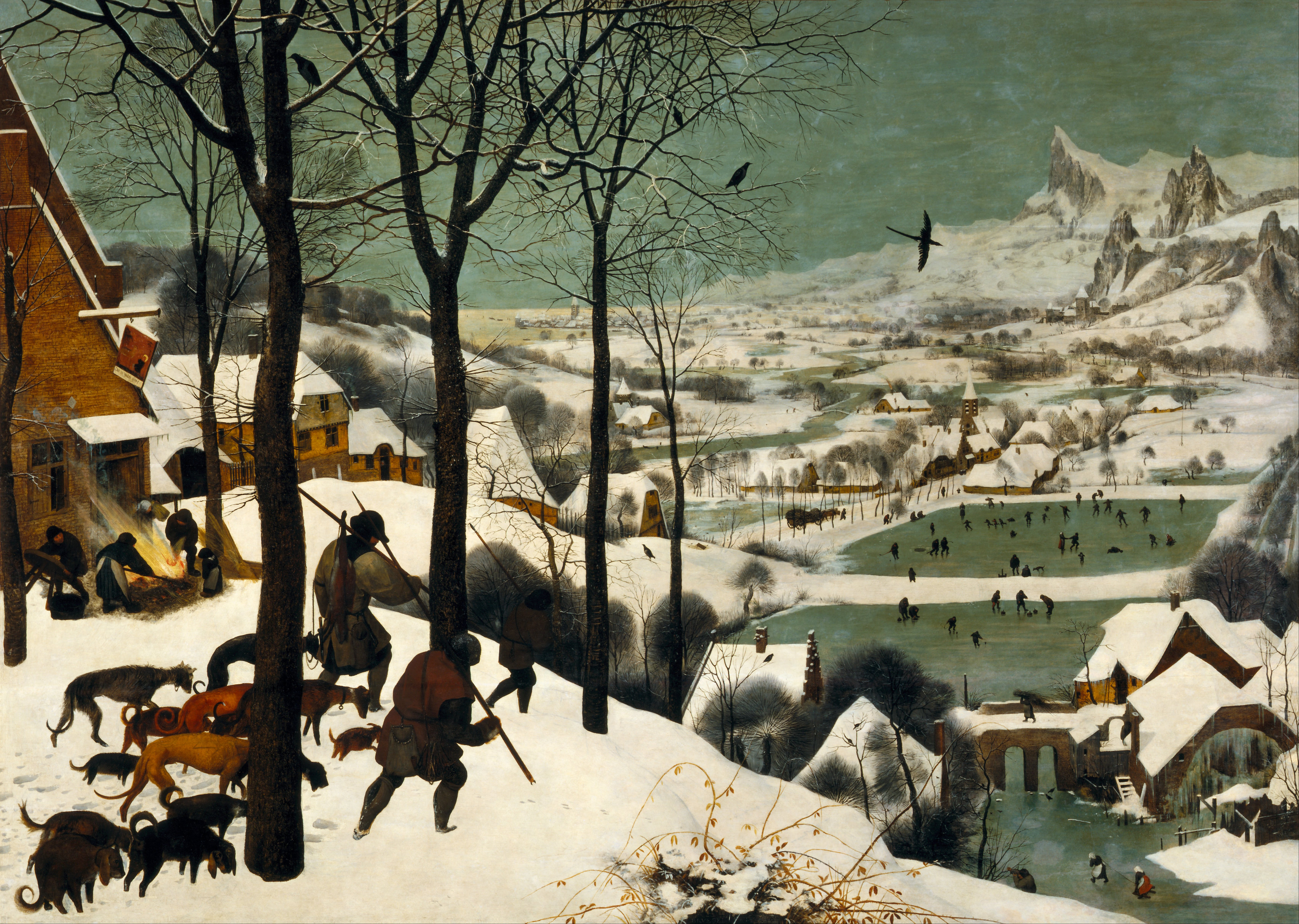
The Hunters in the Snow, Dec–Jan, also known as 'Winter'

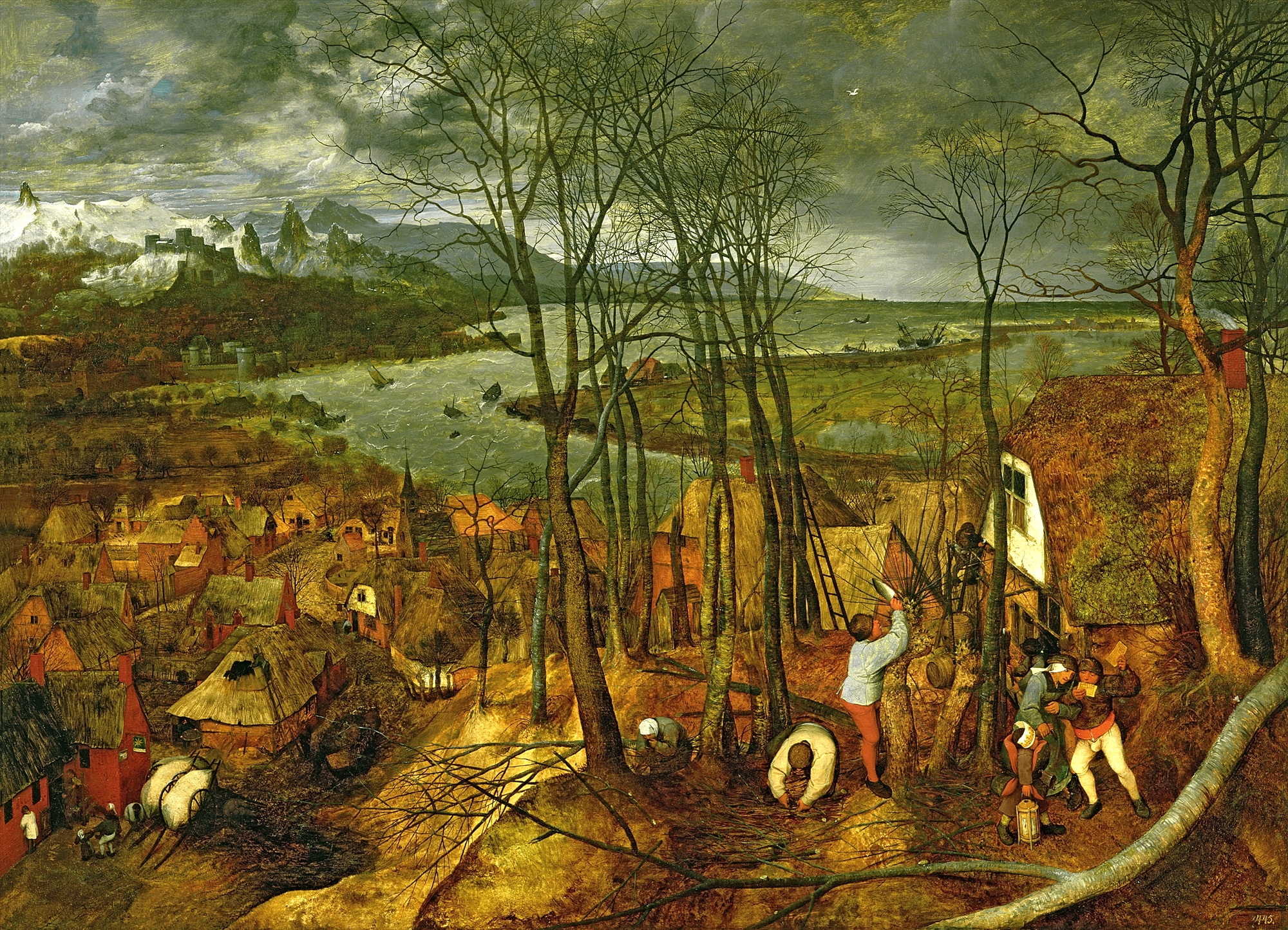
The Gloomy Day, Feb–Mar, also known as 'Early Spring'

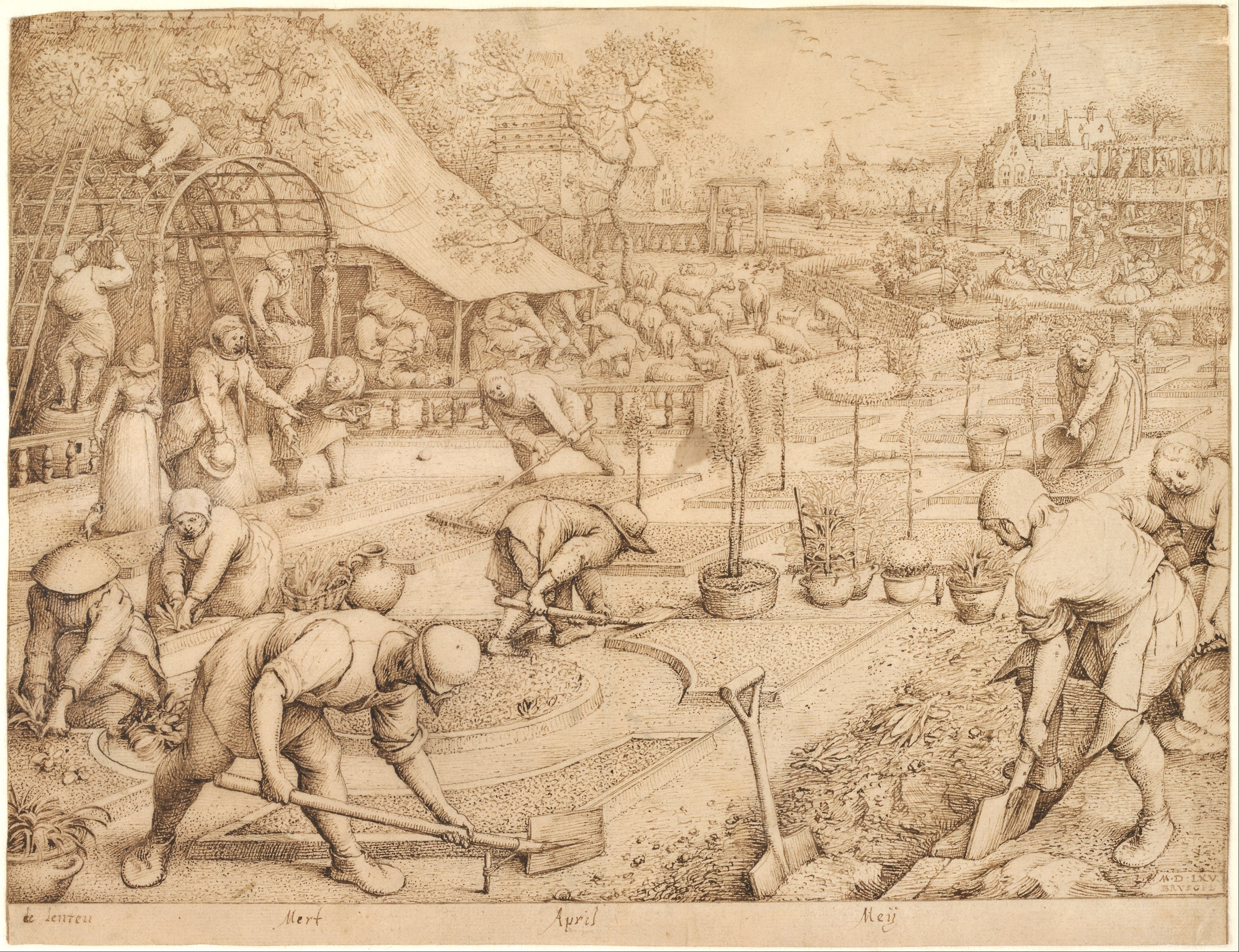
Spring, 1565, a drawing made to be engraved and suggestive of April–May. It was apparently never painted by Bruegel himself, but after his death came dozens of versions in paint by his son and others.

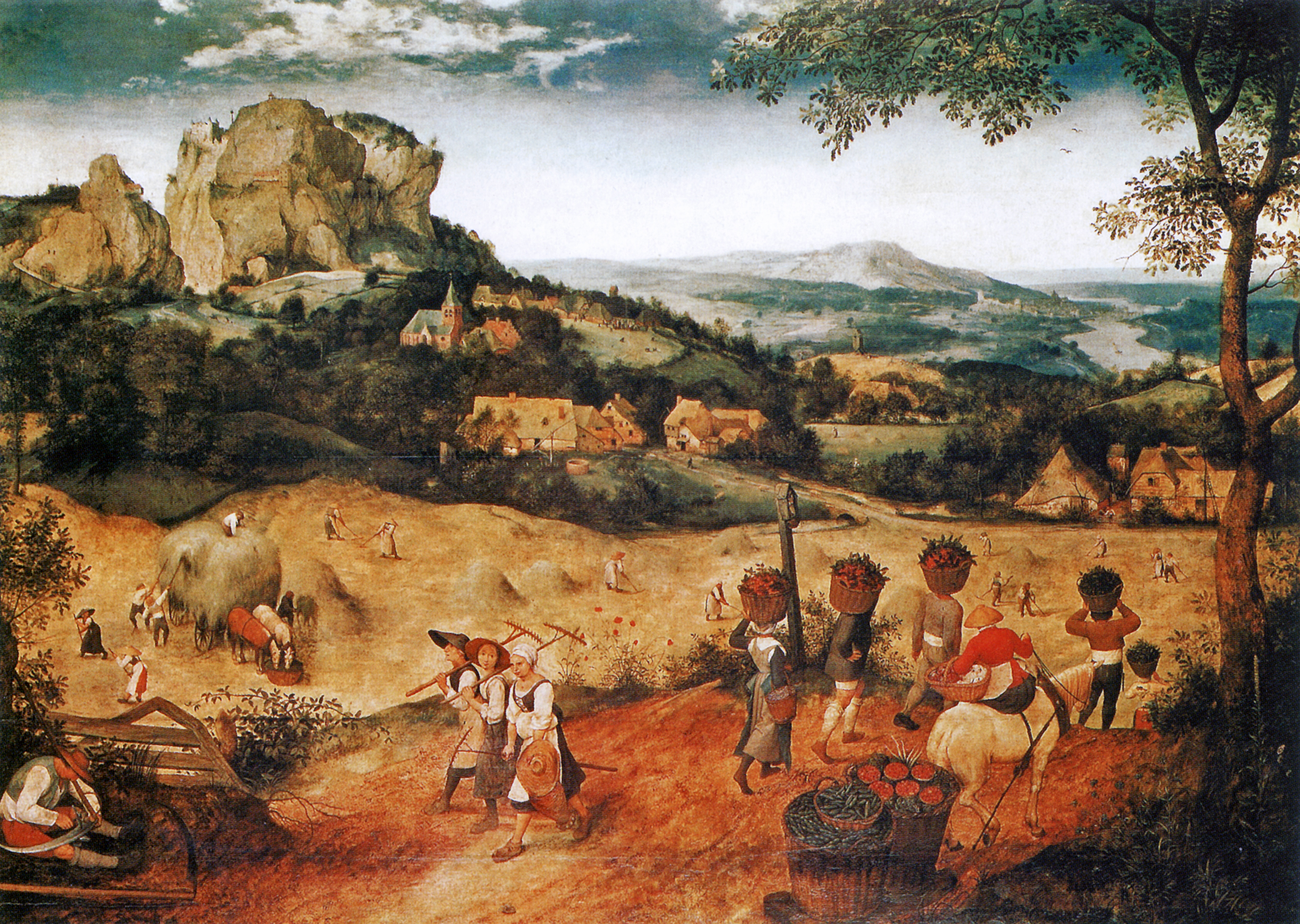
The Hay Harvest, June–July

The Harvesters, Aug–Sept

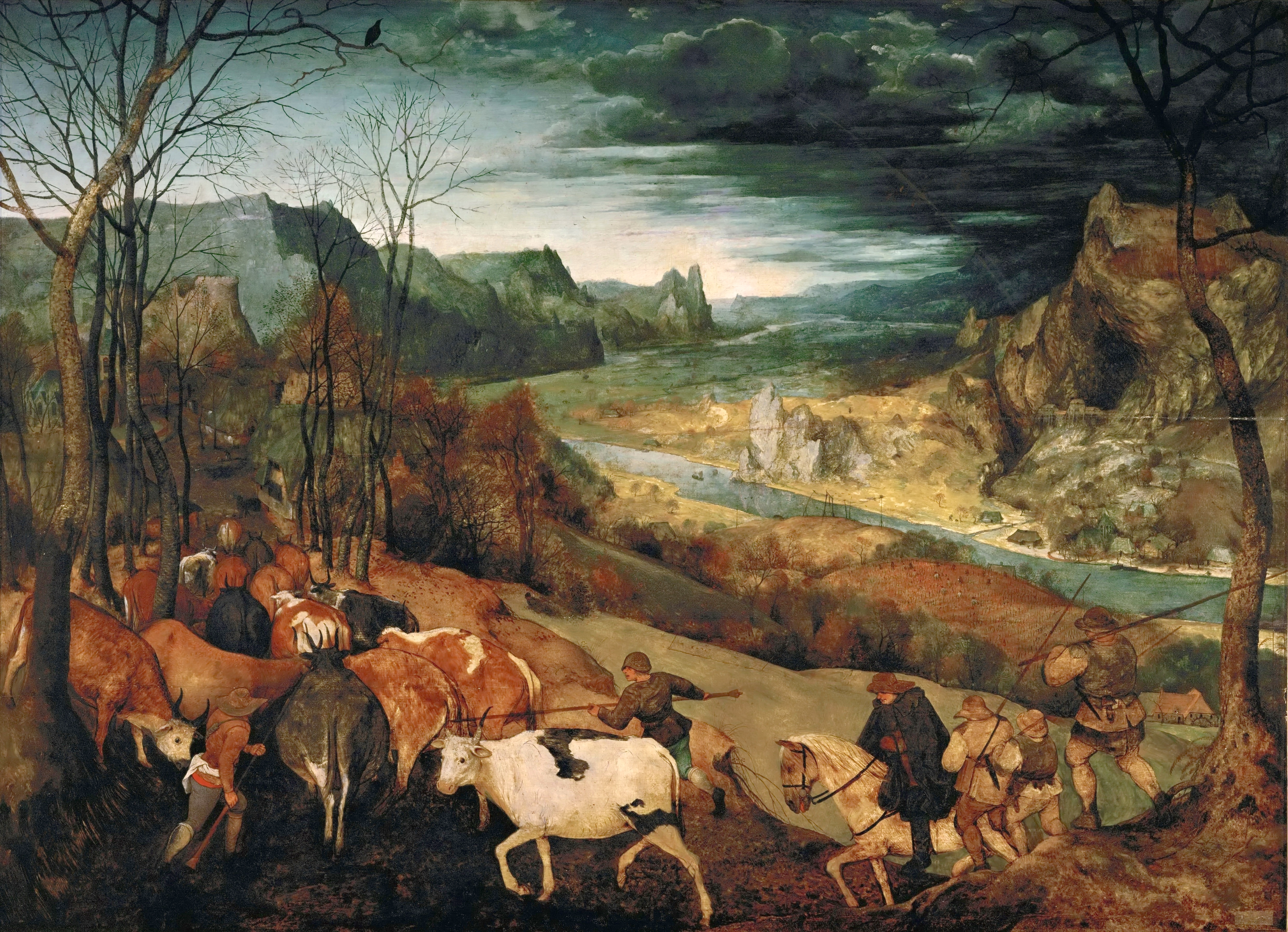
The Return of the Herd, Oct–Nov

== Bruegel's other snow paintings ==
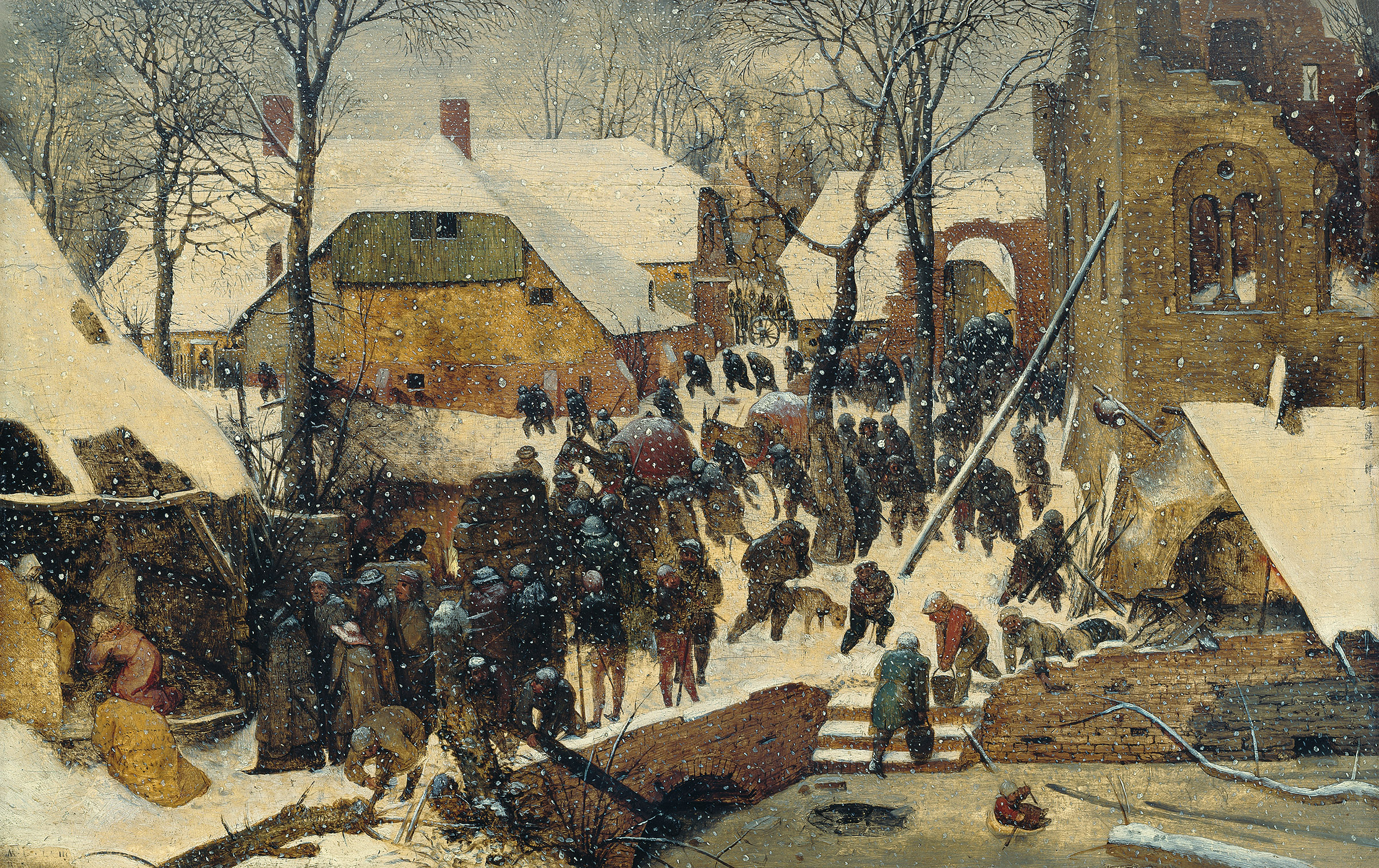
Adoration of the Magi in the Snow (1563)

Winter Landscape with Ice skaters and Bird trap (1565)

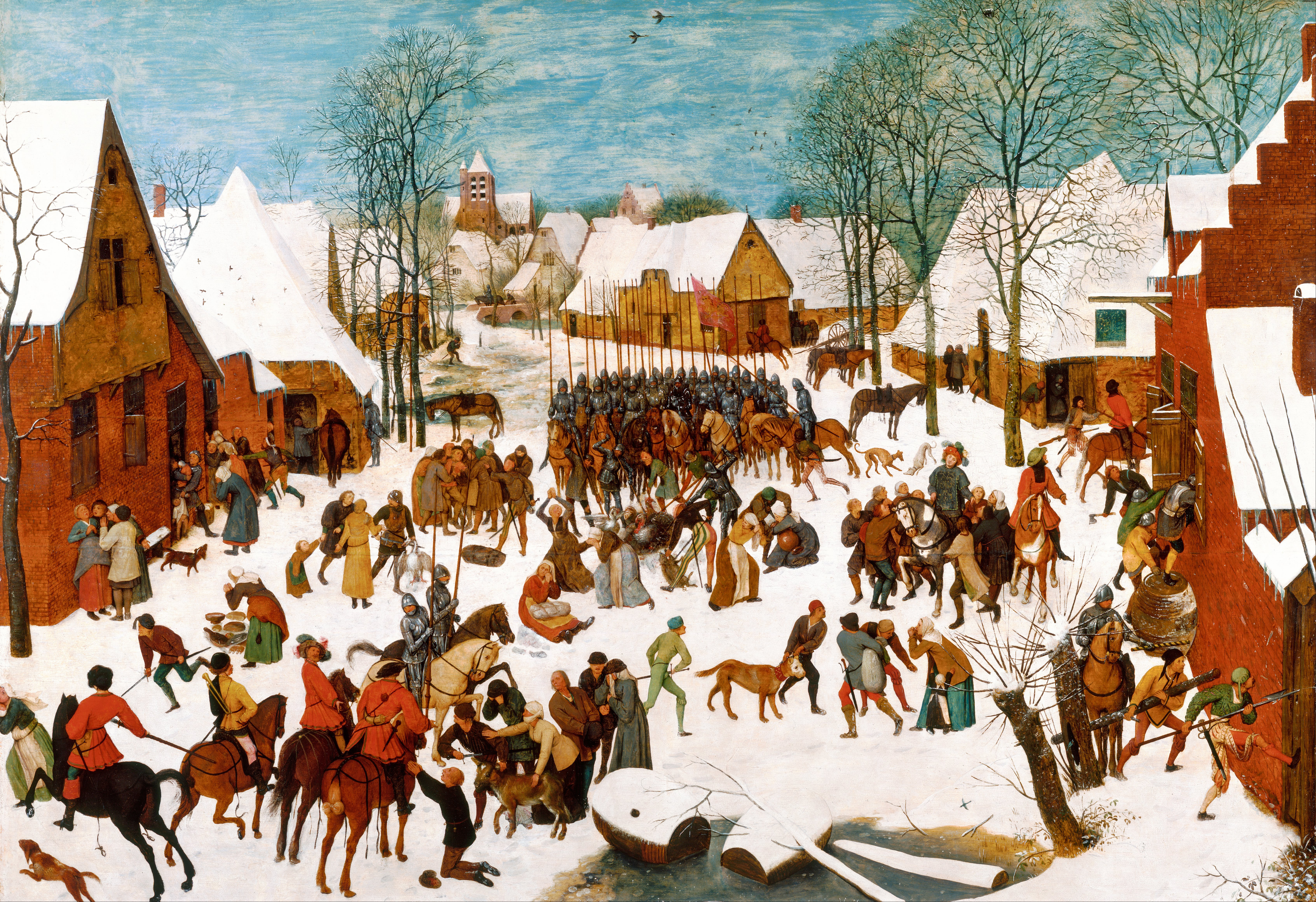
Massacre of the Innocents (c.1565–1567)

The Census at Bethlehem (1566)

== Popular culture ==
Hunters in the Snow appears in Russian director Andrei Tarkovsky's film Solaris (1972), during the zero gravity scene, accompanied by organ prelude BWV 639 by Bach.

The film 24 Frames (2017) is structured in 24 chapters of "Frames" usually set in a fixed camera position filming a scene of nature or the seashore. The 'action' of each Frame is highly constrained and often focuses on either one or two animals either casually interacting or possibly vaguely interacting with one another. The opening Frame depicts The Hunters in the Snow and selectively animates the actions of one of the animals or birds by superimposing movement upon the original canvas to suggest motion and life in process.

The painting is briefly shown in the 2017 horror film It Comes at Night.

In the novel Headlong by Michael Frayn, Martin Clay speculates on the sequence and number of Bruegel's paintings, starting with a disquisition on The Hunters in the Snow, after finding what he believes to be a lost picture of the series in a country house.

A magnified detail of the painting serves as the cover design for Claire Keegan's novel Small Things Like These, published by Faber & Faber for international distribution.

The painting is also included several times in Lars Von Trier's 2011 film Melancholia.

== See also ==
- List of paintings by Pieter Bruegel the Elder
