= Cheng Jiasui =

Chinese landscape painter and poet

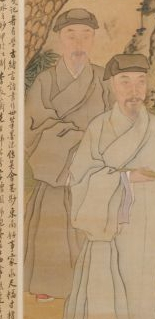
- Born: 1565; Xiuning County, Anhui
- Died: 1643 (aged 77–78)
- Known for: Shan shui
- Movement: Four Teachers of Jiading

Cheng Jiasui (Chinese: 程嘉燧; pinyin: Chéng Jiāsuì; Wade–Giles: Ch'eng Chia-sui) (1565-1643) was a Chinese landscape painter and poet during the Ming dynasty (1368–1644).

Cheng was born in Xiuning in the Anhui province and lived in Jiading. His style name was 'Mengyang' (孟阳) and his pseudonyms or art names were 'Songyuan' (松圆) and 'Ji'an' (偈庵). Cheng's landscape painting followed the style of Huang Gongwang and Ni Zan in its wild and natural taste. Cheng also wrote a number of poems. Along with Tang Shisheng (唐时升), Lou Jian (娄坚), and Li Liufang (李流芳), he was known as one of the "Four Teachers of Jiading" (嘉定四先生).
