= The Gloomy Day =

Painting by Pieter Bruegel the Elder

- Artist: Pieter Bruegel the Elder
- Year: 1565
- Type: Oil on wood
- Dimensions: 118 cm × 163 cm (46 1/2 in × 64 1/8 in)
- Location: Kunsthistorisches Museum, Vienna

The Gloomy Day (Dutch: De sombere dag) is a panel painting in oils by the Netherlandish Renaissance artist Pieter Bruegel the Elder, painted in 1565. It is one in a series of six works, five of which are still extant, that depict different times of the year. The painting is now in the Kunsthistorisches Museum, Vienna, Austria.

== Description ==
The scene is set around February and March, portrayed by the bleak atmosphere and leafless trees. The paper crown around the boy's head and the eating of waffles are references to the Carnival time prior to Lent. The sky, the ships crashing against the shoreline, and the children preparing themselves in the foreground suggest that harsh weather is coming.

In this painting "The bold contrast of shadow and light, the knowing gradation between the planes, and the admirable harmony of yellows, tans and browns qualify this work as a masterpiece. It exudes an ardent melancholy, a strange quality, at once gentle and powerful, that touches and penetrates the viewer".

Bruegel is famous for his paintings of scenery and nature. Most of his paintings of the countryside tell a story or have a moral message.

The surviving Months of the Year cycle are:

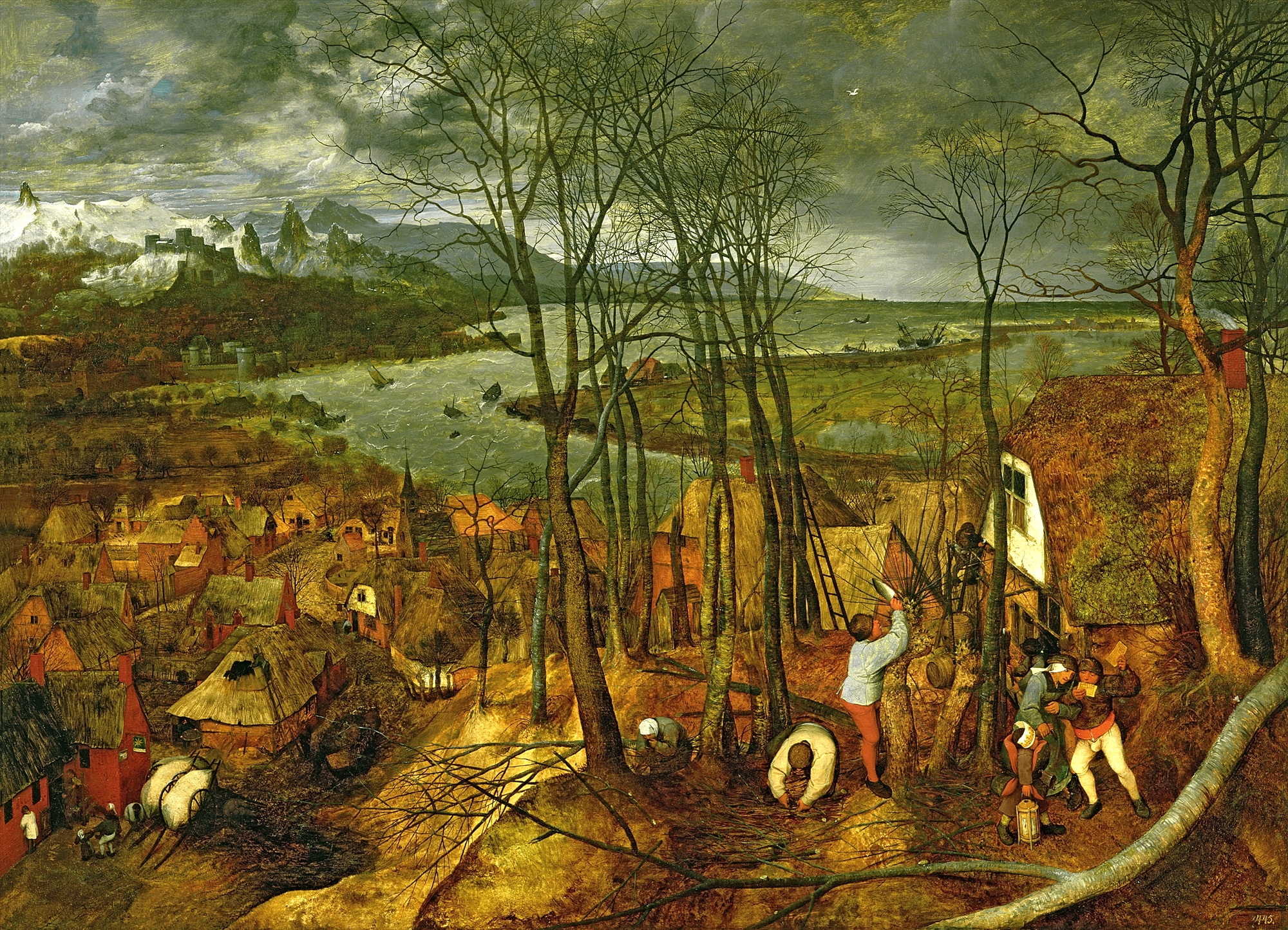
The Gloomy Day

The Harvesters

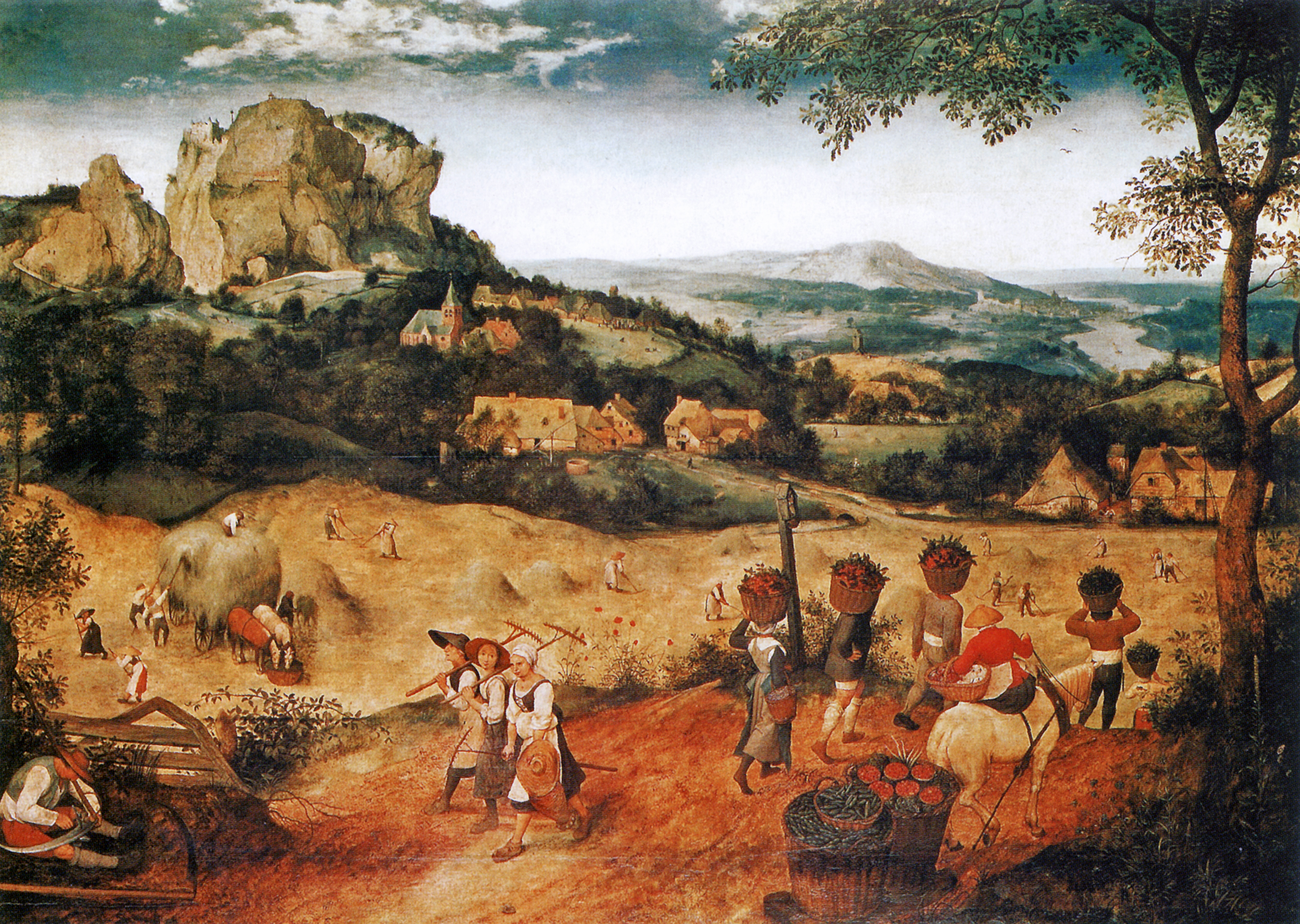
The Hay Harvest

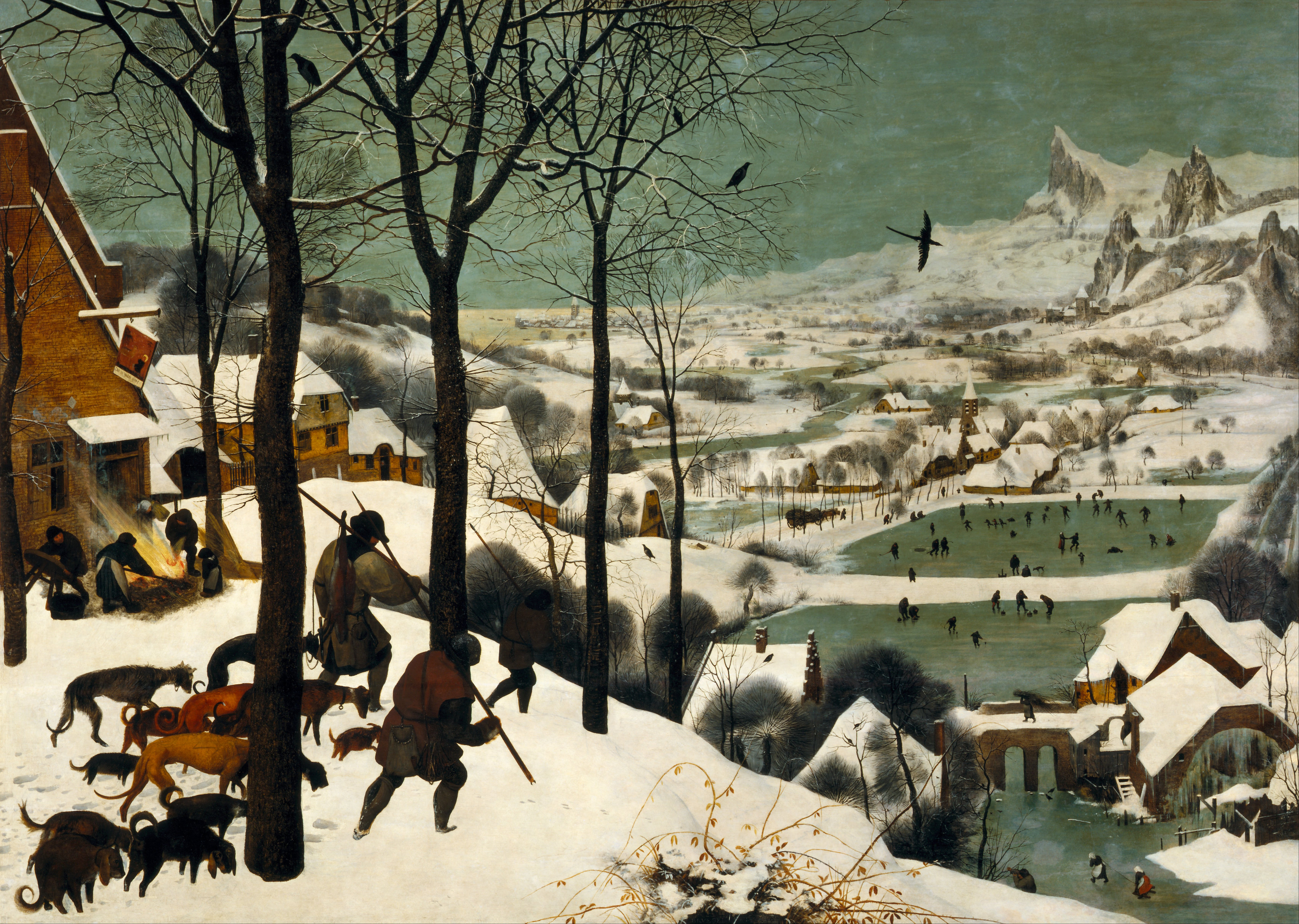
The Hunters in the Snow

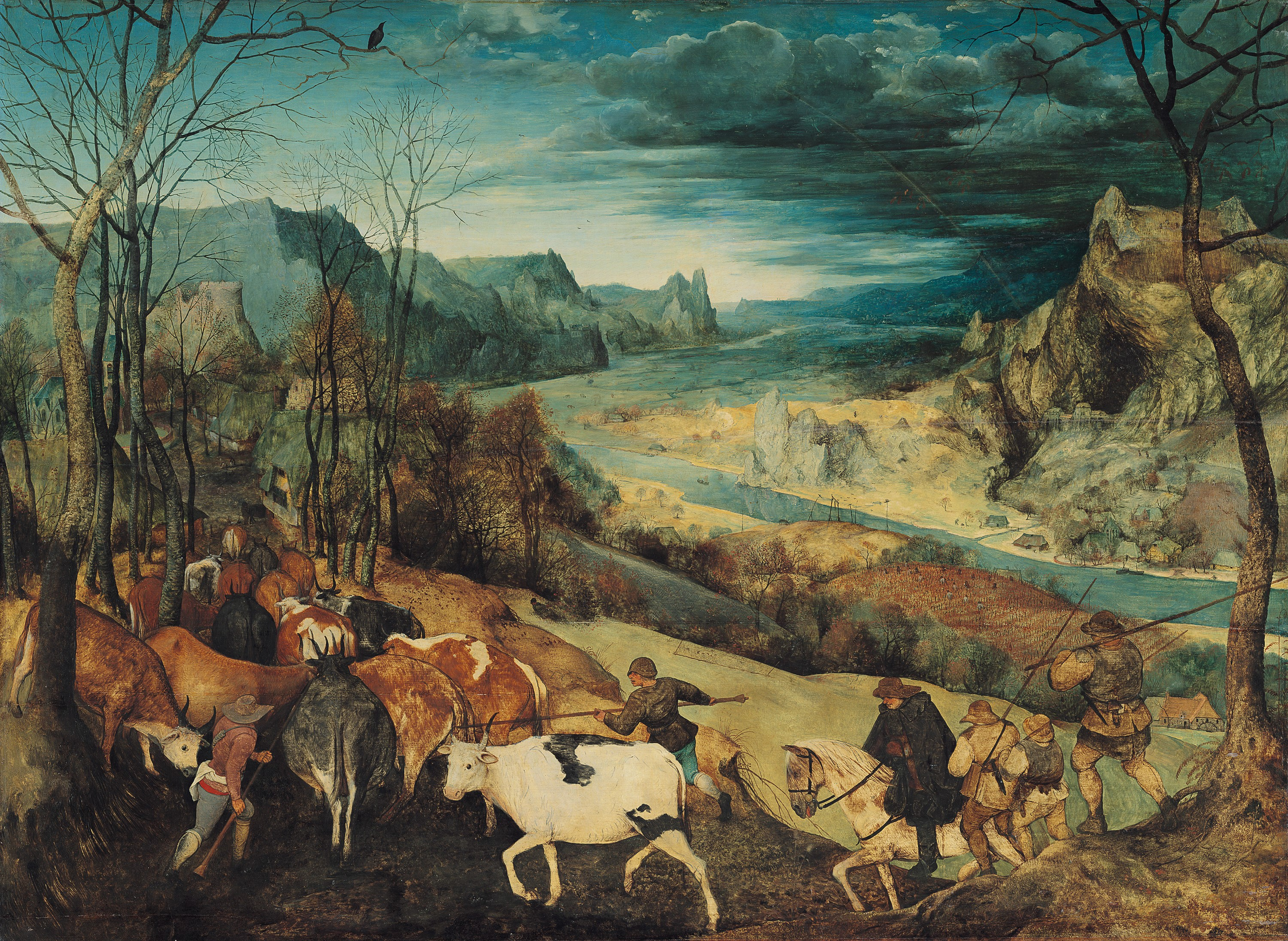
The Return of the Herd

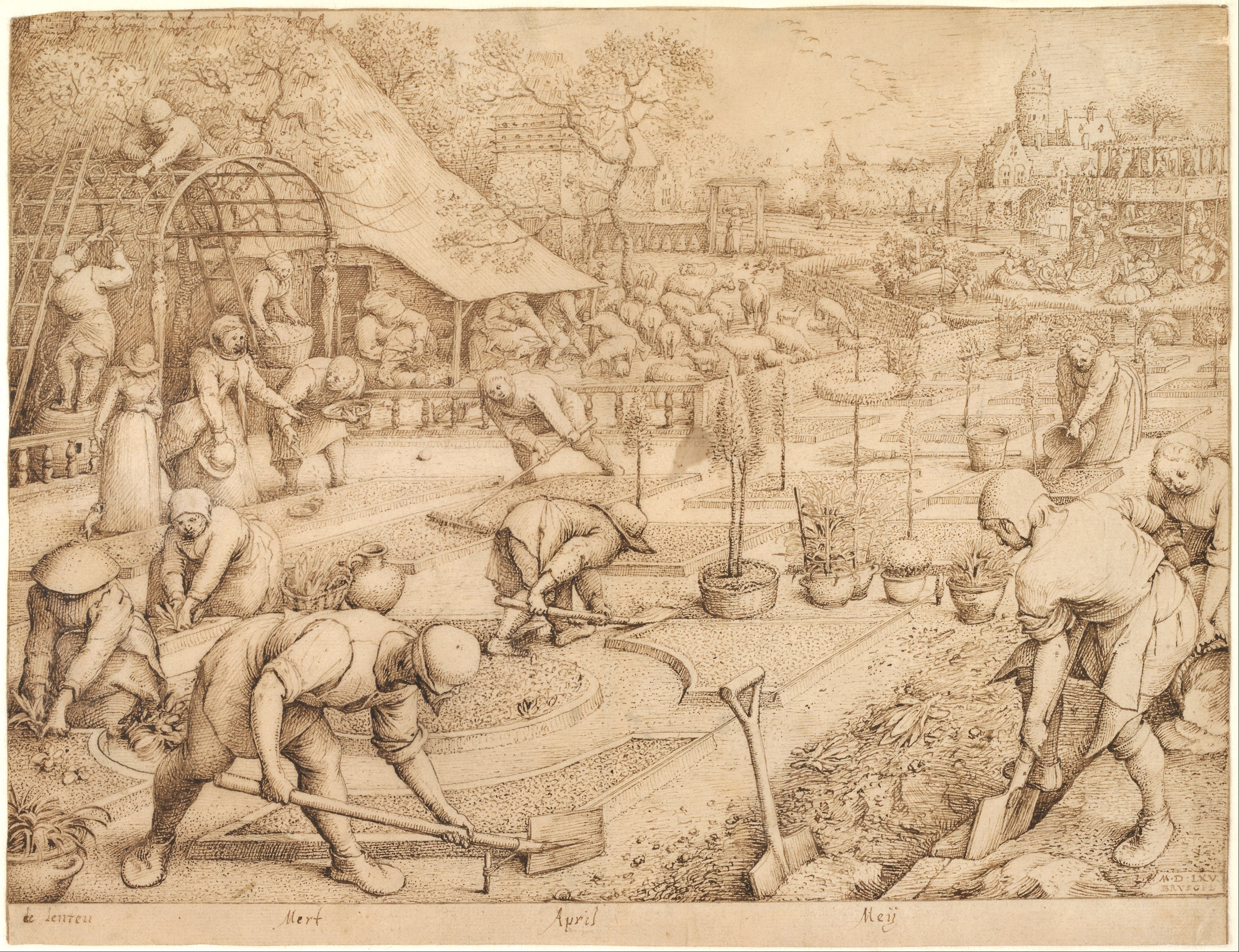
Spring, 1565, original presumed lost

== See also ==
- List of paintings by Pieter Bruegel the Elder
