= The Return of the Herd =

Painting by Pieter Bruegel the Elder

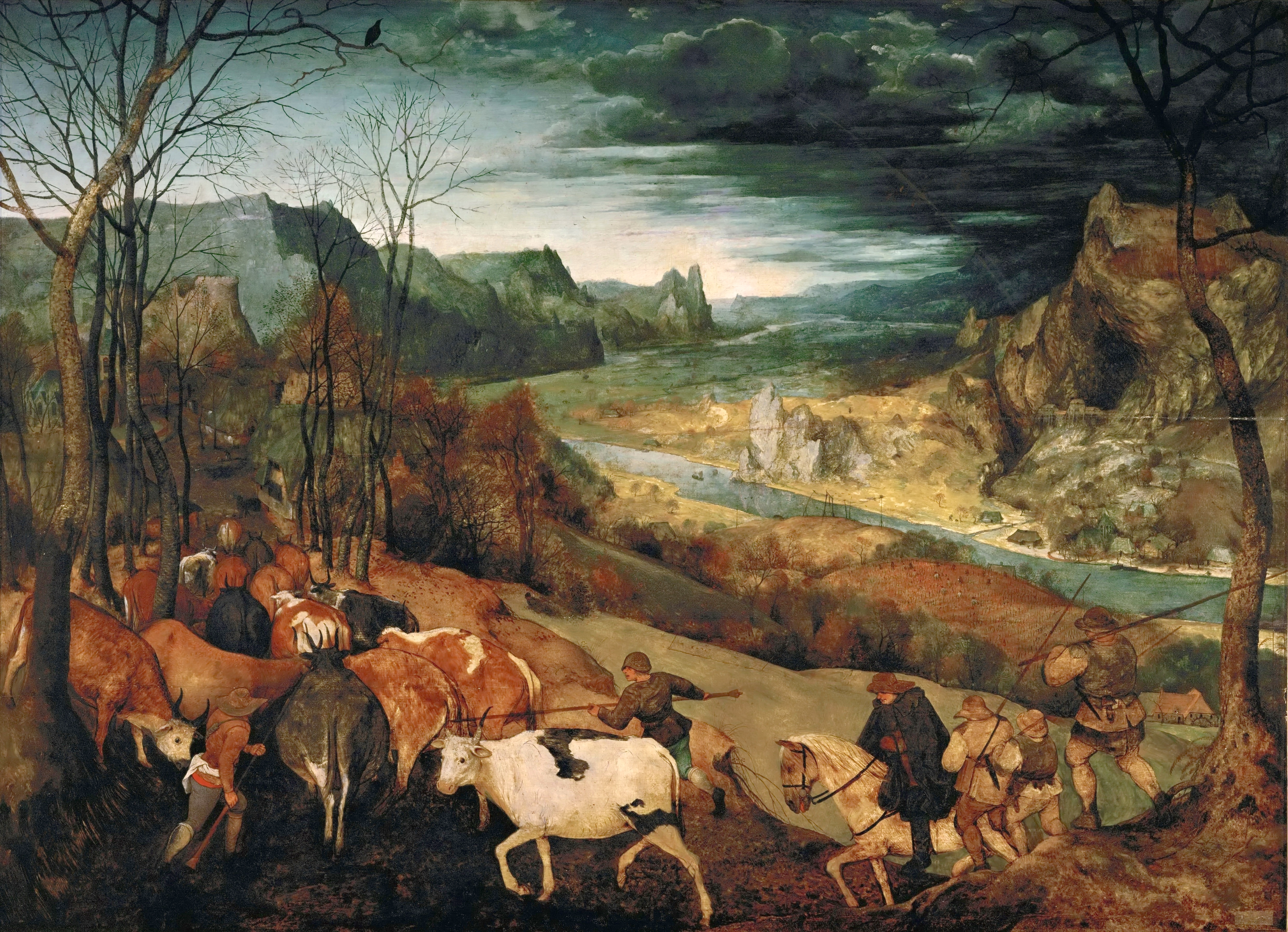
- Artist: Pieter Bruegel the Elder
- Year: 1565
- Type: Oil on wood
- Dimensions: 117 cm × 159 cm (46 in × 62 1/2 in)
- Location: Kunsthistorisches Museum, Vienna

The Return of the Herd is a panel painting in oils by the Netherlandish Renaissance artist Pieter Bruegel the Elder, made in 1565. It is one in a series of six works (High Springtime is presumed lost) that depict different seasons. The painting is now in the Kunsthistorisches Museum, Vienna, Austria. The autumnal colors of the landscape and the bare trees connect this particular painting to October/November.

The surviving Months of the Year cycle are:

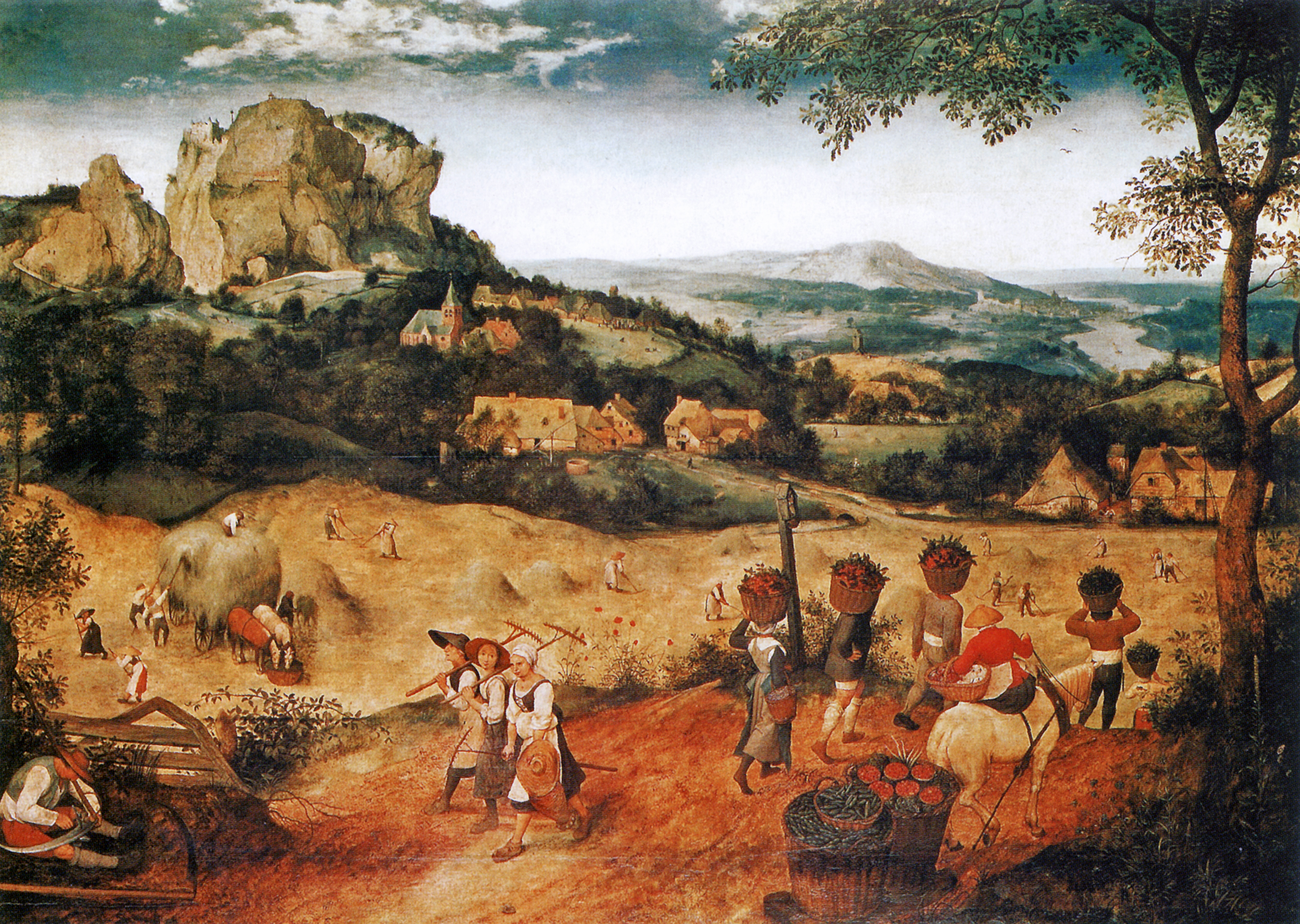
The Hay Harvest

The Harvesters

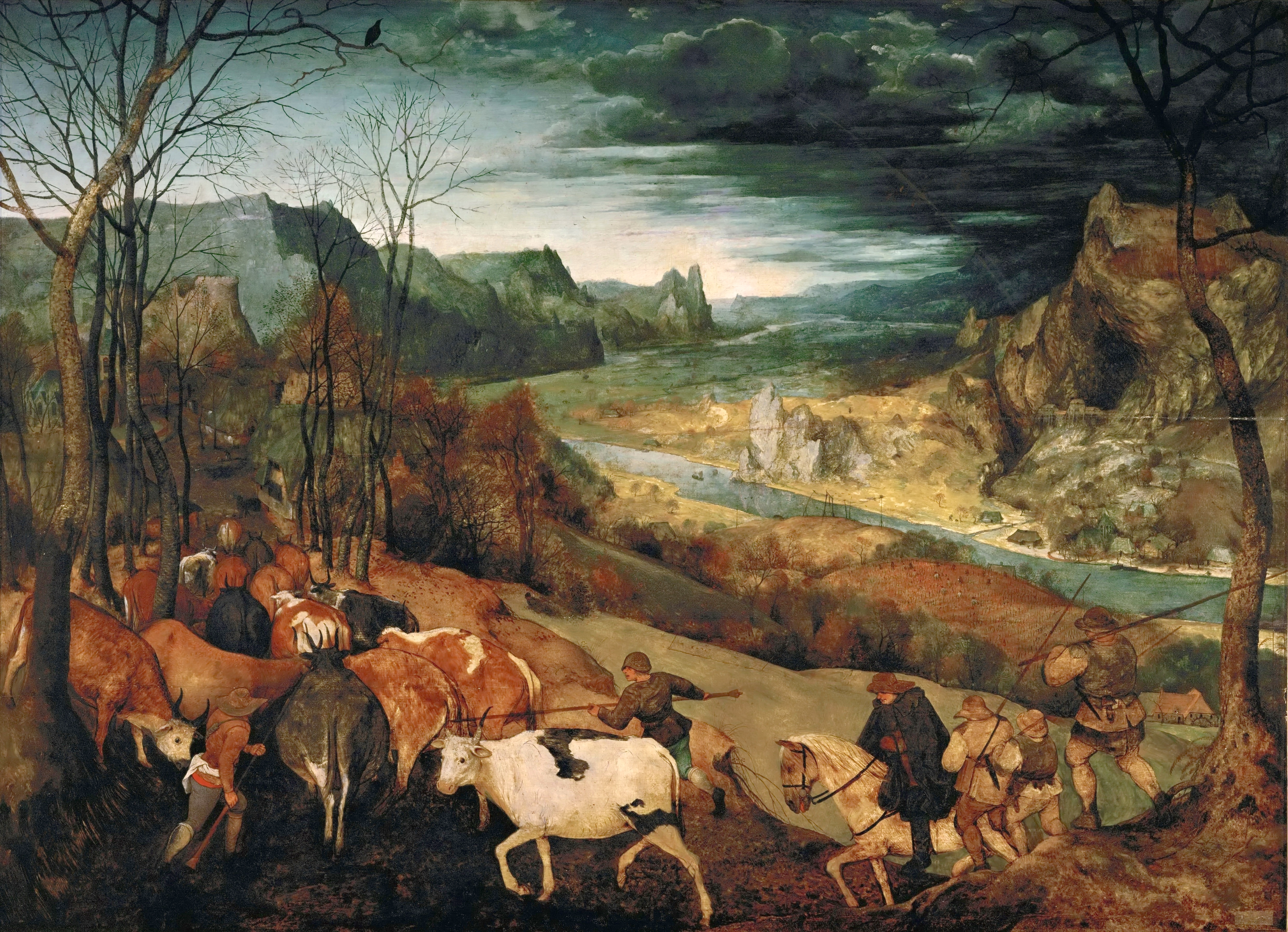
The Return of the Herd

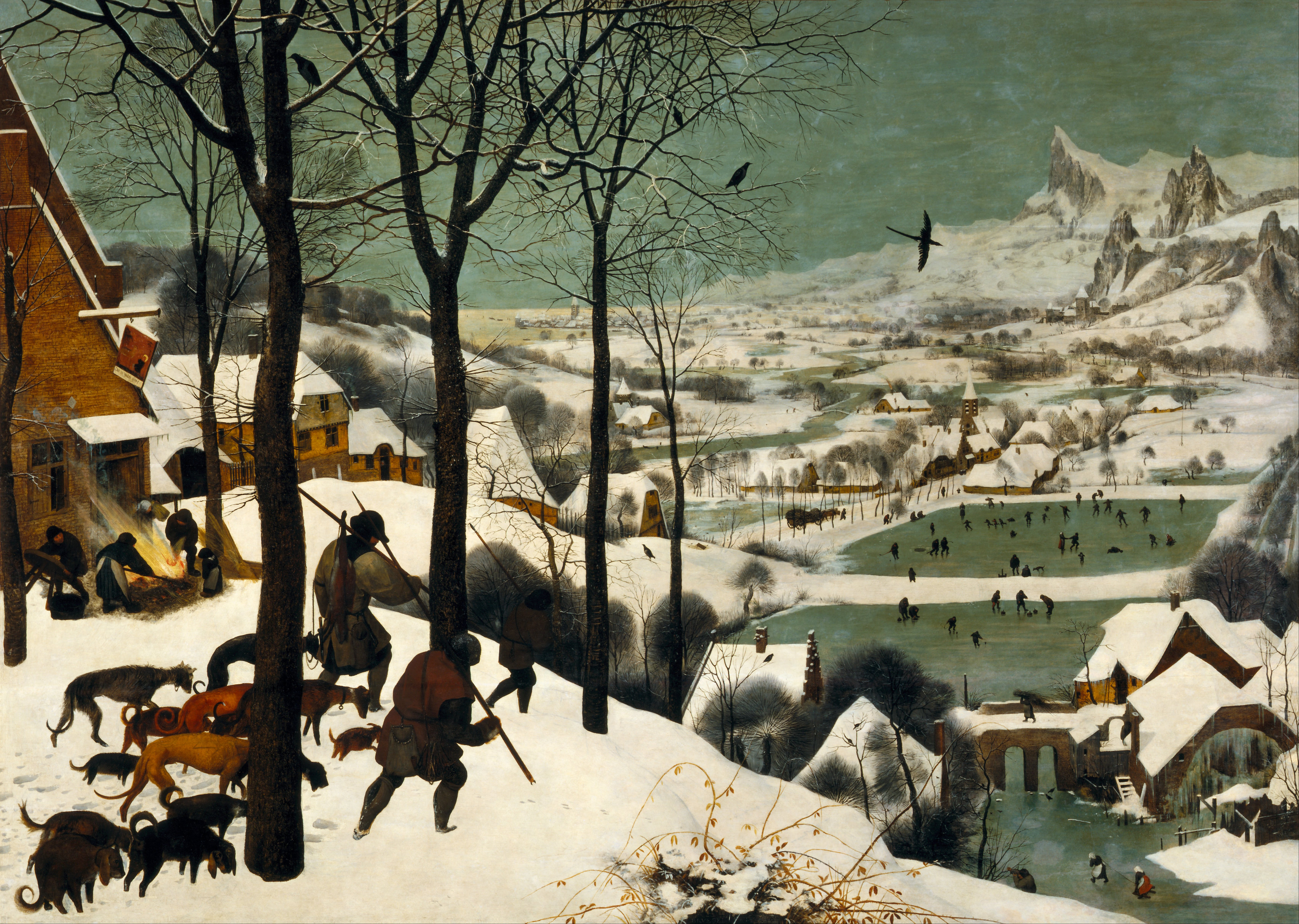
The Hunters in the Snow

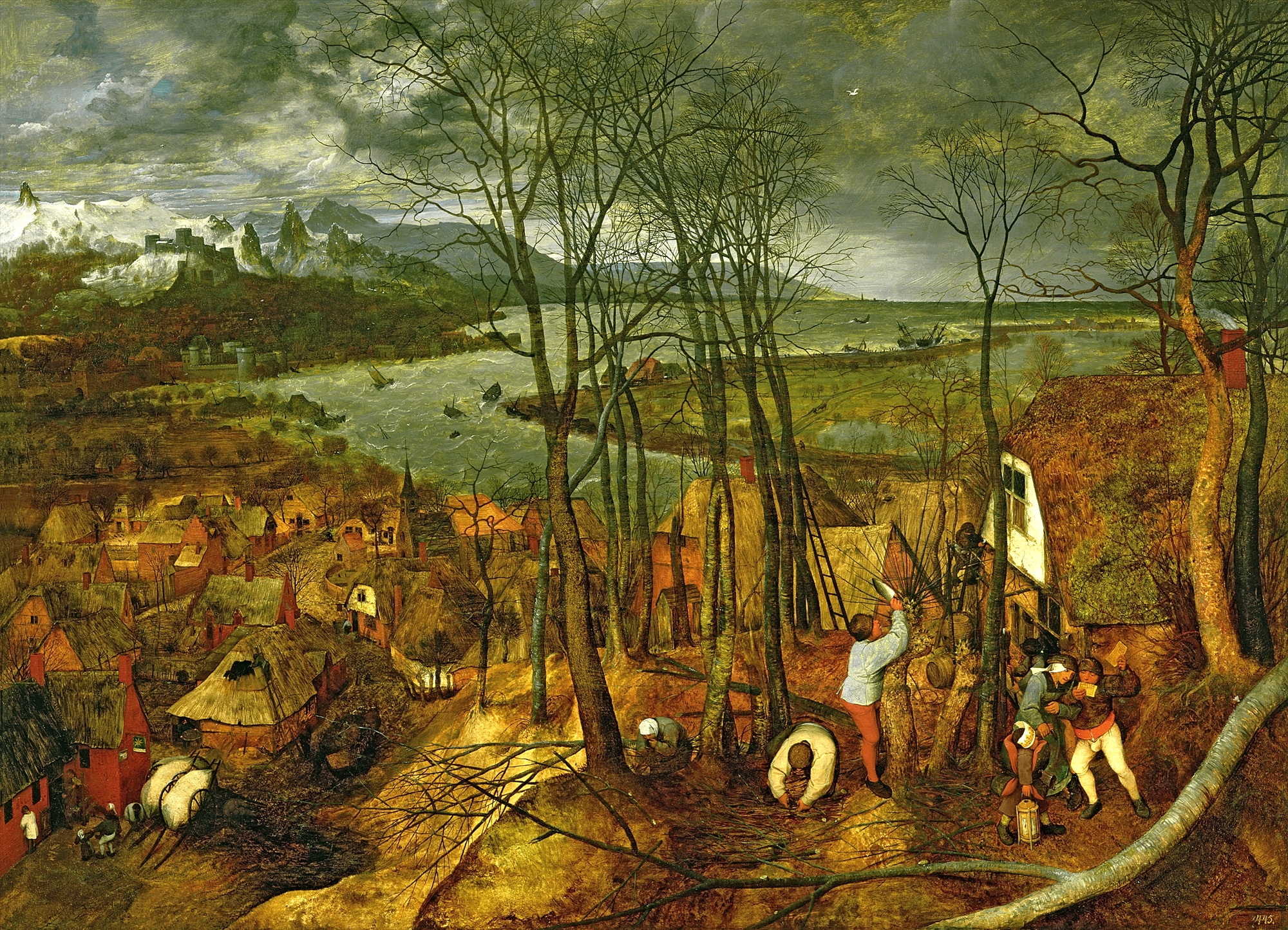
The Gloomy Day

== See also ==
- List of paintings by Pieter Bruegel the Elder
