= Achille Calici =

Italian painter

Achille Calici (born c. 1565) was an Italian painter of the late Renaissance, and early Baroque. He was born in Bologna. He was a pupil first of Prospero Fontana, then of Lodovico Carracci. He painted the two laterals of the high altar in the church of San Michele Arcangelo at Bologna, representing St. Michael, and the angel Raphael and Tobias.
