= The Harvesters (painting) =

Painting by Pieter Bruegel the Elder

- Artist: Pieter Bruegel the Elder
- Year: 1565
- Type: Oil on wood
- Dimensions: 119 cm × 162 cm (46 7/8 in × 63 3/4 in)
- Location: Metropolitan Museum of Art, New York

The Harvesters is an oil painting on wood completed by the Netherlandish Renaissance artist Pieter Bruegel the Elder in 1565. It depicts the harvest time set in a landscape, in the months of July and August or late summer. Nicolaes Jonghelinck, a merchant banker and art collector from Antwerp, commissioned this painting as part of a cycle of six paintings depicting various seasonal transitions during the year.

== Painting ==
The painting is one in a series of six (or perhaps twelve) works, five of which are still extant, that depict different times of the year. As in many of his paintings, the focus is on peasants and their work and does not have the religious themes common in landscape works of the time. Notably, some of the peasants are shown eating while others are harvesting wheat, a depiction of both the production and consumption of food. Pears can be seen on the white cloth in front of the upright sitting woman who eats bread and cheese while a figure in the tree to the far right picks pears. The painting shows a large number of activities representative of the 16th-century Belgian rural life. For example, on the far right a person is shaking apples from the tree. In the center left of the painting, a group of villagers can be seen participating in the blood sport of cock throwing. The painting has been at the Metropolitan Museum of Art in New York City since 1919. The Metropolitan Museum of Art calls this painting a “watershed in the history of Western art” and the “first modern landscape”. A sense of distance is conveyed by the workers carrying sheaves of wheat through the clearing, the people bathing in the pond, the children playing and the ships far away.

== Cycle ==
The surviving Months of the Year cycle are:

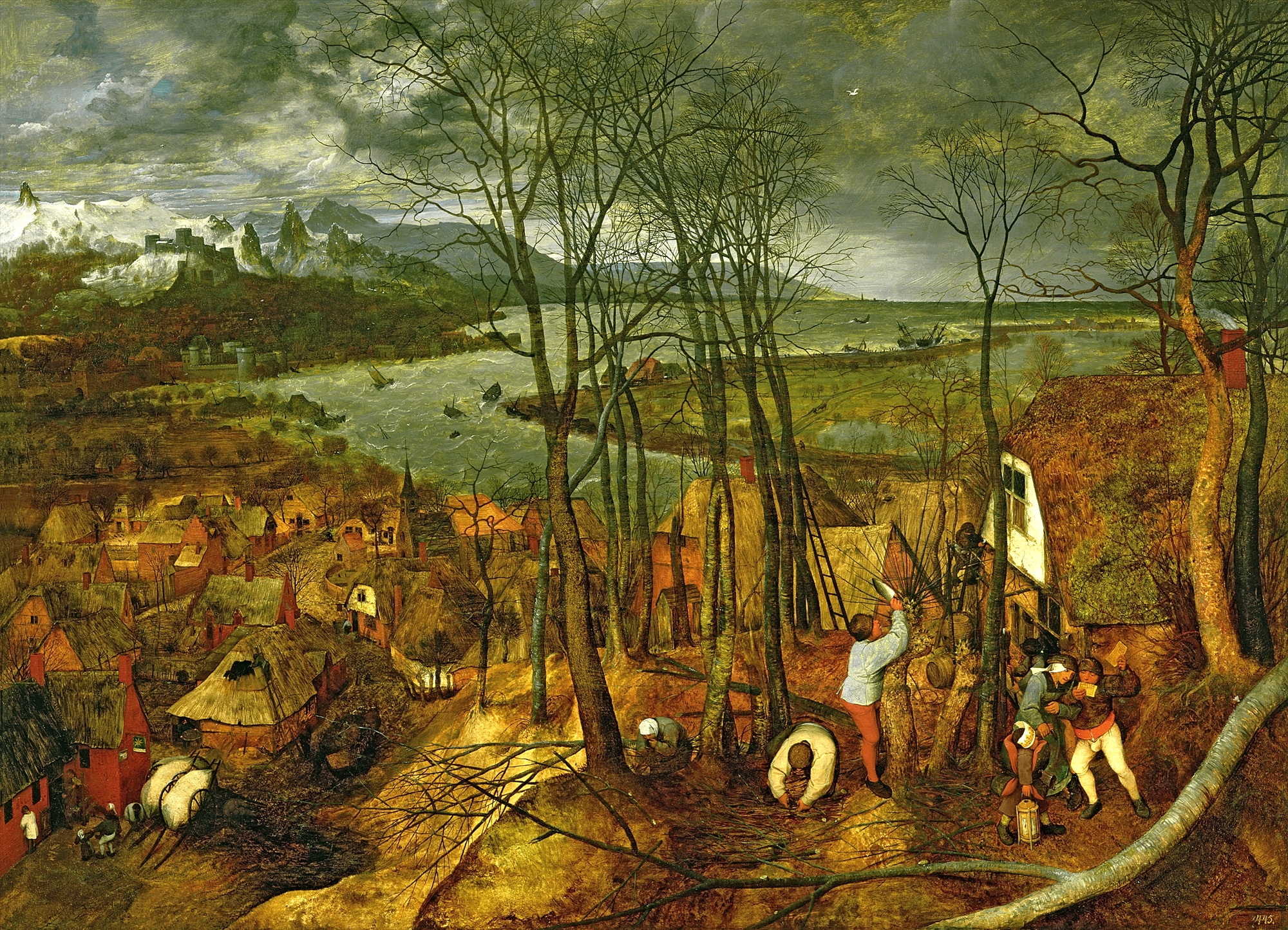
The Gloomy Day

The Harvesters

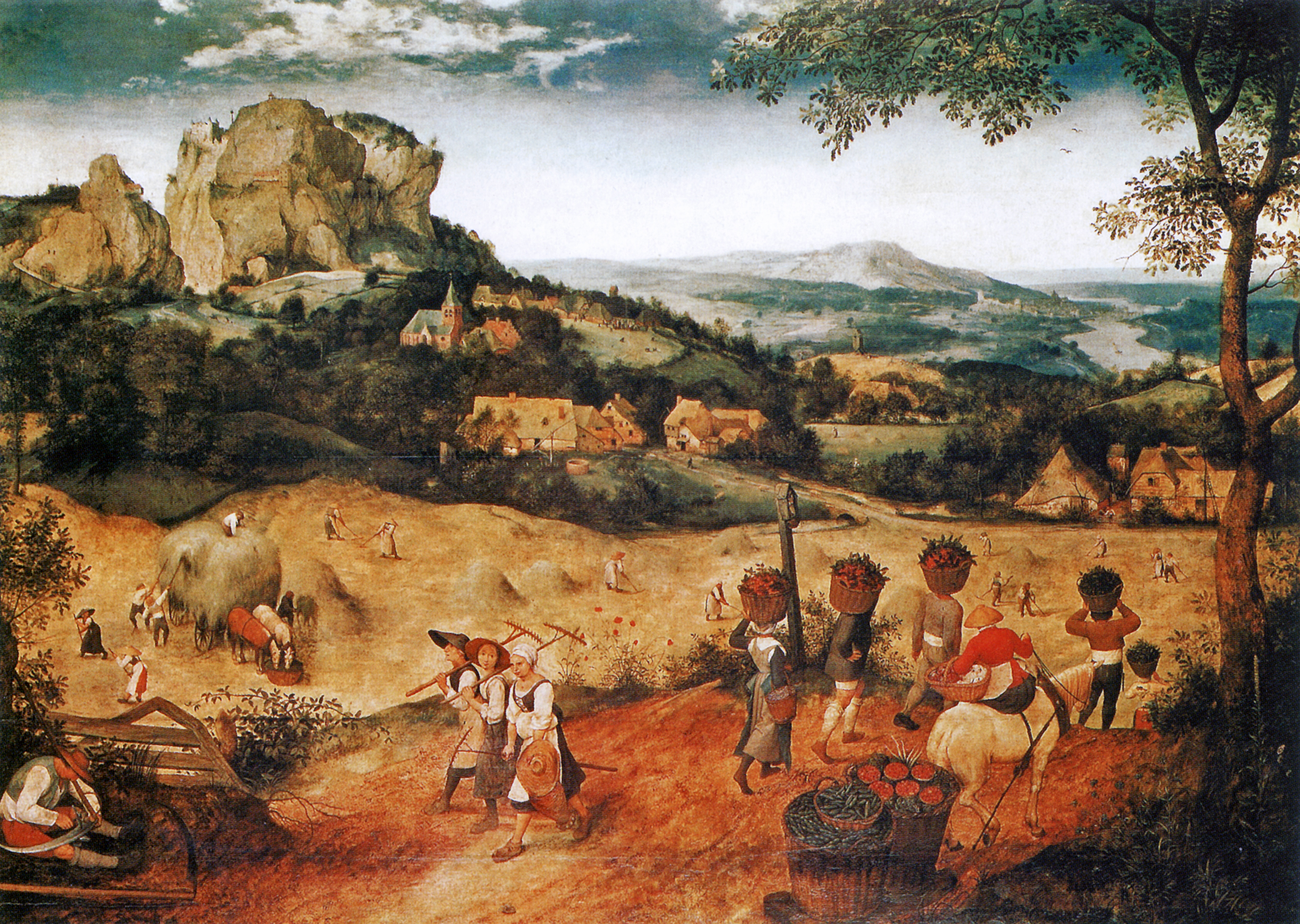
The Hay Harvest

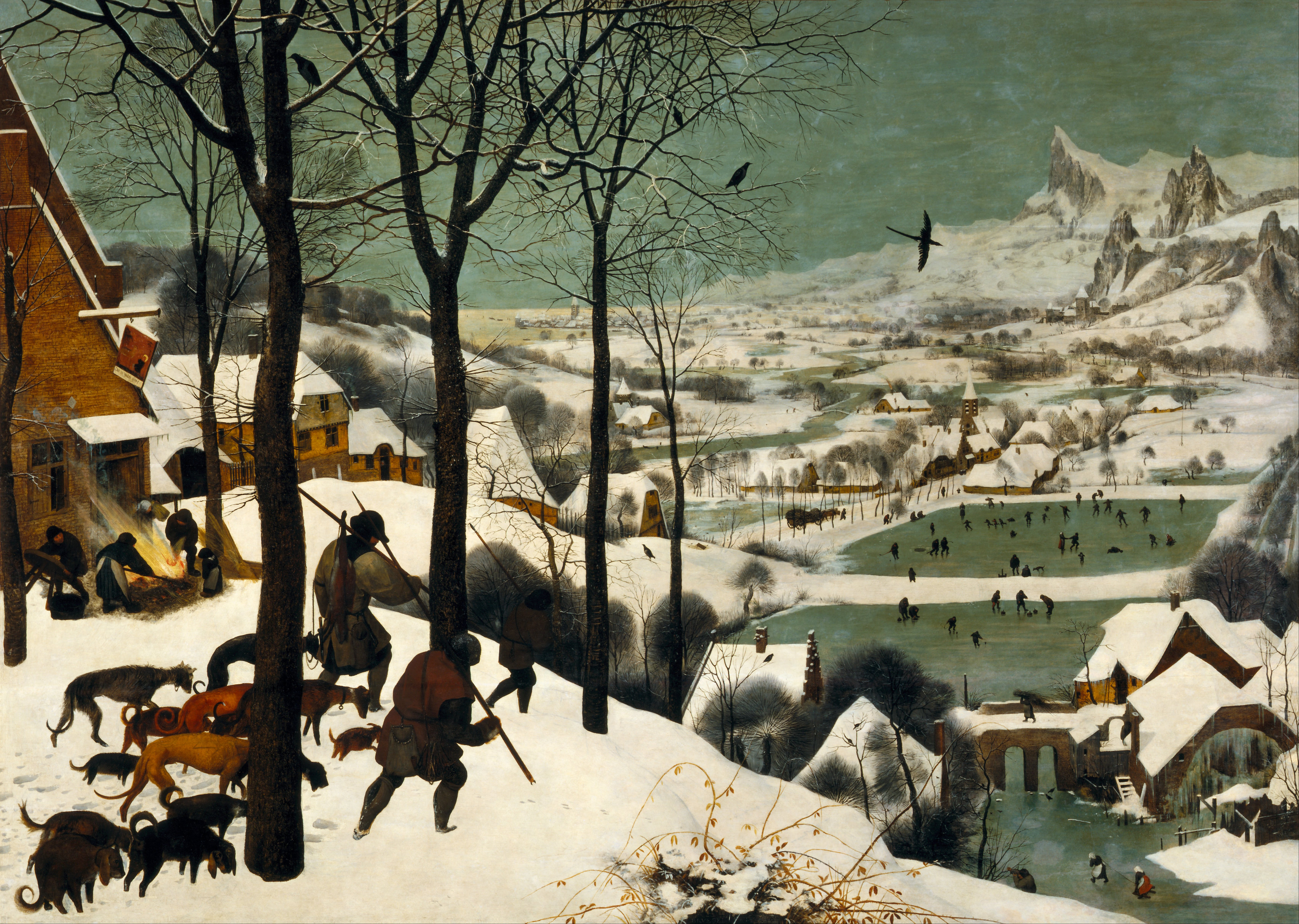
The Hunters in the Snow

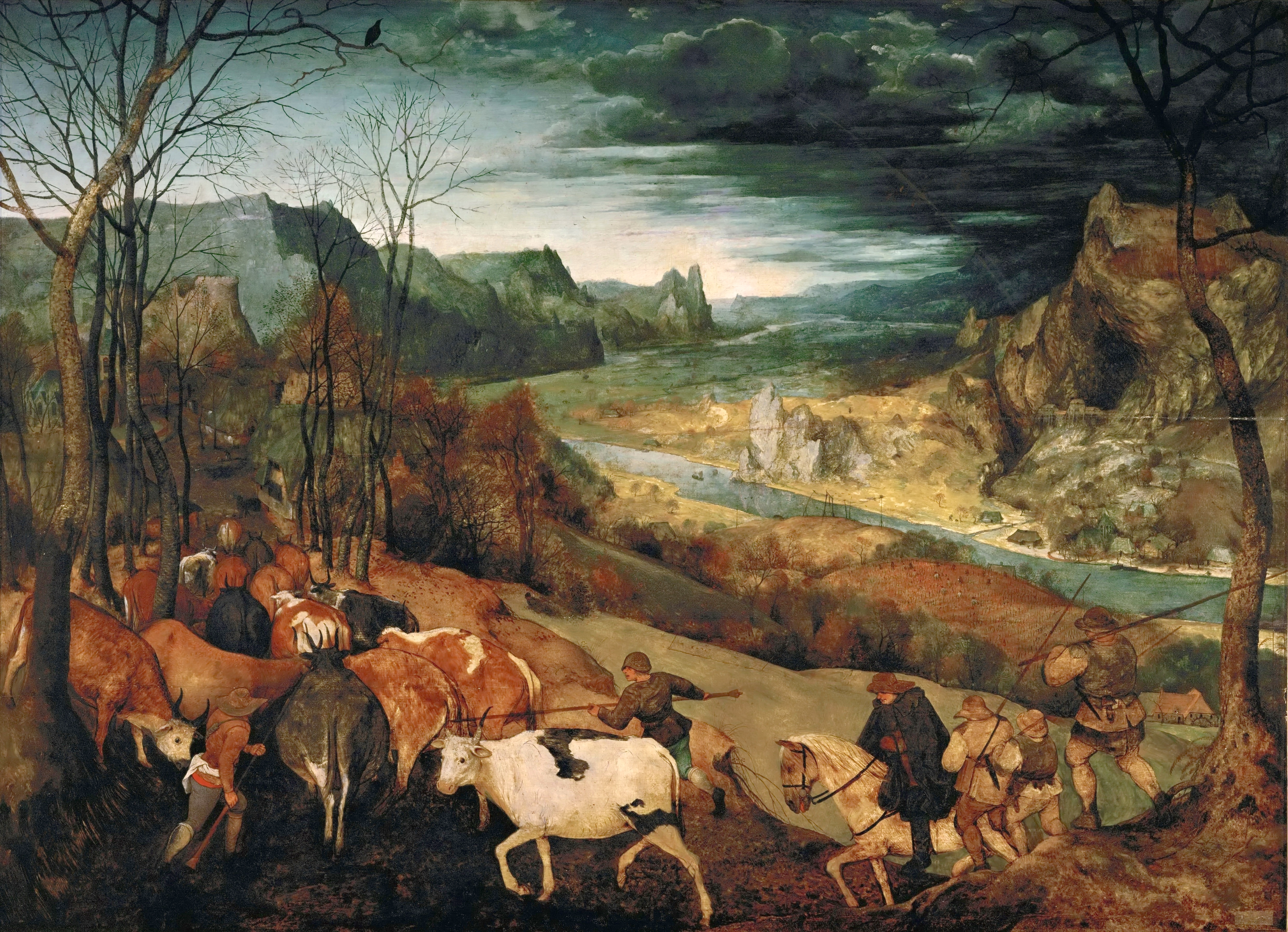
The Return of the Herd

The Gloomy Day, The Hunters in the Snow, and The Return of the Herd are on display in the Kunsthistorisches Museum in Vienna. The Hay Harvest is on display in the Lobkowicz Palace in Prague. The Harvesters is at the Metropolitan Museum in New York.

== Legacy ==
Legendary animation director, Hayao Miyazaki took inspiration from this painting for his short film Mr. Dough and the Egg Princess.

== See also ==
- List of paintings by Pieter Bruegel the Elder
