= The Hay Harvest =

Painting by Pieter Bruegel the Elder

- Artist: Pieter Bruegel the Elder
- Year: 1565
- Type: Oil on wood
- Dimensions: 117 cm × 161 cm (46 in × 63 in)
- Location: Lobkowicz Palace at Prague Castle, Prague

The Hay Harvest (also known as Haymaking), is an oil painting on wood panel by the Netherlandish Renaissance artist Pieter Bruegel the Elder (c. 1525–1569), executed in 1565. The most important of the Lobkowicz family's Northern pictures, it was hung in the dining room of the Antwerp merchant Niclaes Jongelink. This work was originally part of a series of six panels, each presumed to represent two months of the year – in this case June and July.

In 1594 all six panels were given by the city of Antwerp to Archduke Ernst, Governor of the Netherlands. It is believed that the whole series was selected by Rudolph II at the division of his younger brother's estate in 1595. By 1659 only five panels are listed in the Vienna inventory of the Archduke Leopold Wilhelm (1614–1662). It is not known if by that date The Hay Harvest had already left the imperial collections, nor is it known when the Lobkowicz family acquired it, though it is first recorded as in their possession in 1870.

The painting is now part of the Lobkowicz family collection, located in the Lobkowicz Palace within Prague Castle, in the Czech Republic.

== See also ==
- List of paintings by Pieter Bruegel the Elder
