= Little Ice Age =

Climatic cooling after the Medieval Warm Period (16th–19th centuries)

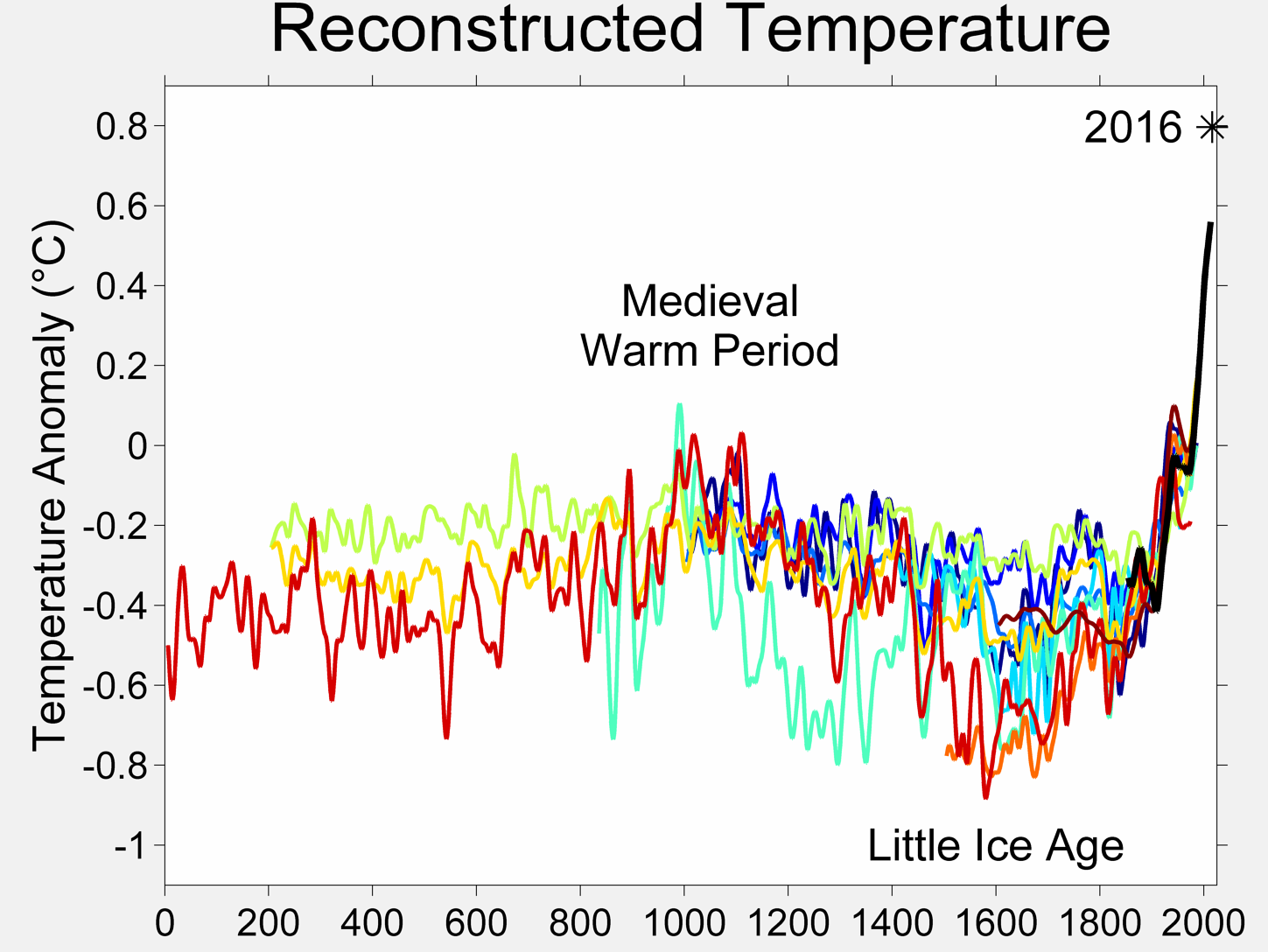
Comparison of 11 different reconstructions of temperatures during the last 2000 years, biased towards the Northern Hemisphere. (More recent reconstructions are plotted in front and in redder colors, older reconstructions in the back and in bluer colors.) Temperature measurements from 1850 to 2004 are shown in black. Medieval Warm Period and Little Ice Age are not considered globally synchronous events, but rather periods of regional climate variations.

Global average temperatures show that the Late Antique Little Ice Age and Medieval Warm Period were not distinct planet-wide periods. The Little Ice Age can also be considered a regional phenomenon occurring near the end of a long temperature decline that preceded recent global warming.

The Little Ice Age (LIA) was a period of regional cooling, particularly pronounced in the North Atlantic region. It was not a true ice age of global extent. The term was introduced into scientific literature by François E. Matthes in 1939. The period has been conventionally defined as extending from the 16th to the 19th centuries, but some experts prefer an alternative time-span from about 1300 to about 1850.

The NASA Earth Observatory notes three particularly cold intervals. One began about 1650, another about 1770, and the last in 1850, all of which were separated by intervals of slight warming. The Intergovernmental Panel on Climate Change Third Assessment Report considered that the timing and the areas affected by the LIA suggested largely independent regional climate changes, rather than a globally synchronous increased glaciation. At most, there was modest cooling of the Northern Hemisphere during the period.

Several causes have been proposed: cyclical lows in solar radiation, heightened volcanic activity, changes in the ocean circulation, variations in Earth's orbit and axial tilt (orbital forcing), inherent variability in global climate, and decreases in the human population (such as from the massacres by Genghis Khan, the Black Death and the epidemics emerging in the Americas upon European contact).

== Areas involved ==
The Intergovernmental Panel on Climate Change Third Assessment Report (TAR) of 2001 described the areas that were affected:

Evidence from mountain glaciers does suggest increased glaciation in a number of widely spread regions outside Europe prior to the twentieth century, including Alaska, New Zealand and Patagonia. However, the timing of maximum glacial advances in these regions differs considerably, suggesting that they may represent largely independent regional climate changes, not a globally-synchronous increased glaciation. Thus current evidence does not support globally synchronous periods of anomalous cold or warmth over this interval, and the conventional terms of "Little Ice Age" and "Medieval Warm Period" appear to have limited utility in describing trends in hemispheric or global mean temperature changes in past centuries. ... [Viewed] hemispherically, the "Little Ice Age" can only be considered as a modest cooling of the Northern Hemisphere during this period of less than 1°C relative to late twentieth century levels.

The IPCC Fourth Assessment Report (AR4) of 2007 discusses more recent research and gives particular attention to the Medieval Warm Period:

... when viewed together, the currently available reconstructions indicate generally greater variability in centennial time scale trends over the last 1 kyr than was apparent in the TAR. ... The result is a picture of relatively cool conditions in the seventeenth and early nineteenth centuries and warmth in the eleventh and early fifteenth centuries, but the warmest conditions are apparent in the twentieth century. Given that the confidence levels surrounding all of the reconstructions are wide, virtually all reconstructions are effectively encompassed within the uncertainty previously indicated in the TAR. The major differences between the various proxy reconstructions relate to the magnitude of past cool excursions, principally during the twelfth to fourteenth, seventeenth and nineteenth centuries.

== Dating ==
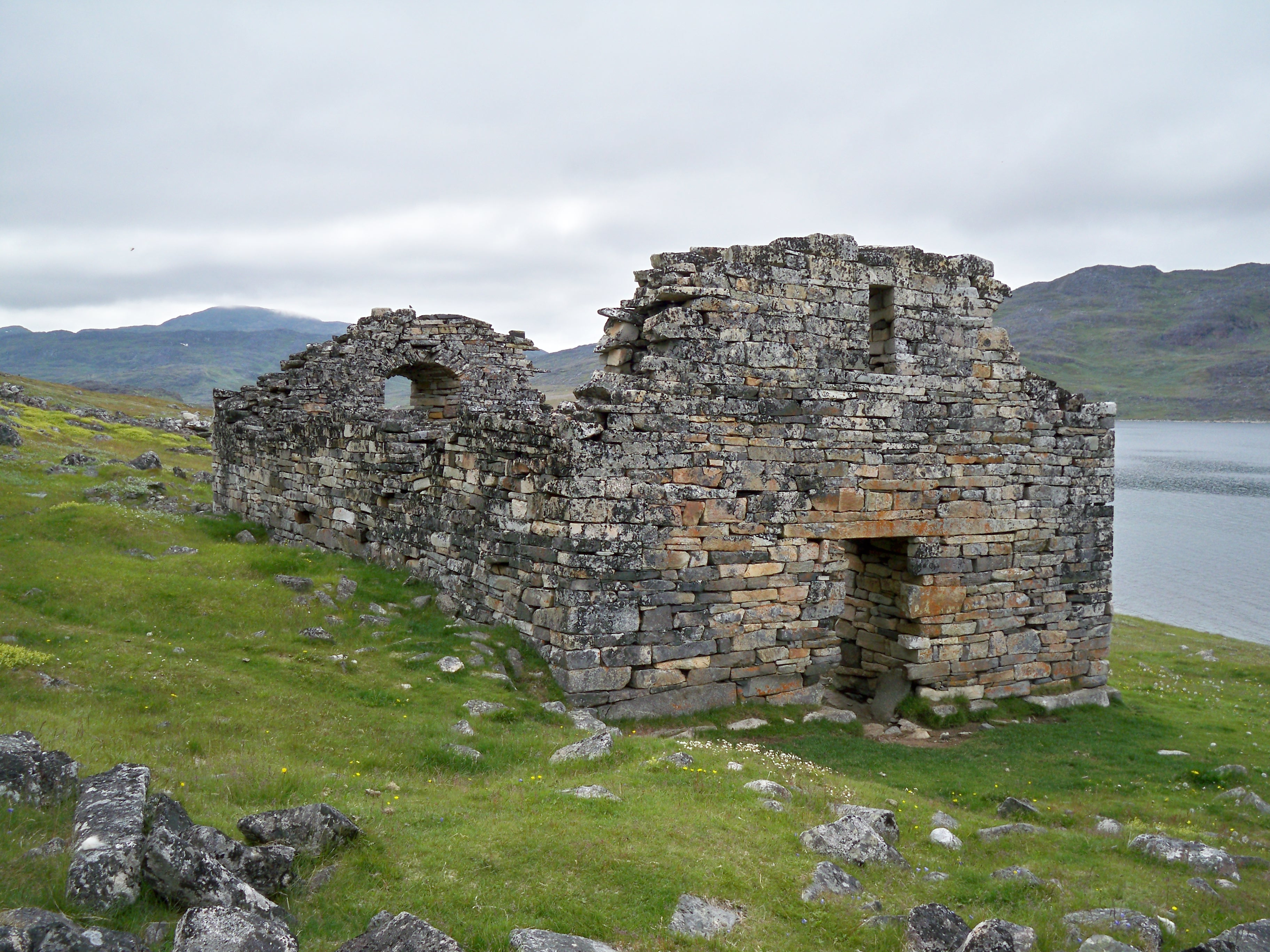
The last written records of the Norse Greenlanders are from a 1408 marriage at Hvalsey Church, which is now the best-preserved Norse ruin.

There is no consensus on when the Little Ice Age began, but a series of events before the known climatic minima have often been referenced. According to J. M. Lamb of Cambridge University, the Little Ice Age was already under way in Canada and Switzerland and in the wider North Atlantic region in the 13th and 14th centuries. In the 13th century, pack ice began advancing southwards in the North Atlantic, as did glaciers in Greenland. Anecdotal evidence suggests expanding glaciers almost worldwide. Based on radiocarbon dating of roughly 150 samples of dead plant material with roots intact that were collected from beneath ice caps on Baffin Island and Iceland, Miller et al. (2012) state that cold summers and ice growth began abruptly between 1275 and 1300, followed by "a substantial intensification" from 1430 to 1455.

In contrast, a climate reconstruction based on the length of glaciers shows no great variation from 1600 to 1850 but a strong retreat thereafter.

Therefore, any of several dates ranging over 400 years may indicate the beginning of the Little Ice Age:

- 1250 for when Atlantic pack ice began to grow, a cold period that was possibly triggered or enhanced by the massive eruption of the Samalas volcano in 1257 and the associated volcanic winter.
- 1275 to 1300 for when the radiocarbon dating of plants shows that they were killed by glaciation
- 1300 for when warm summers stopped being dependable in Northern Europe
- 1315 for when rains and the Great Famine of 1315–1317 occurred
- 1560 to 1630 for when the worldwide glacial expansion, known as the Grindelwald Fluctuation, began
- 1650, not the start of the Little Ice Age, but the start of the coldest years midway through, i.e., the First Climatic Minimum

The Little Ice Age ended in the latter half of the 19th century or in the early 20th century.

The 6th report of the IPCC describes the coldest period in the last millennium as:

a multi-centennial period of relatively low temperature beginning around the 15th century, with GMST averaging –0.03 [–0.30 to 0.06] °C between 1450 and 1850 relative to 1850–1900.

The definitions for the beginning and end of the LIA differ considerably, depending on the region and dataset used. The LIA in the Northern Hemisphere started between 1200 and 1400 AD. In the Southern Hemisphere the beginning of the LIA was delayed by about two centuries.

== By region ==
=== Europe ===
==== Central Europe ====
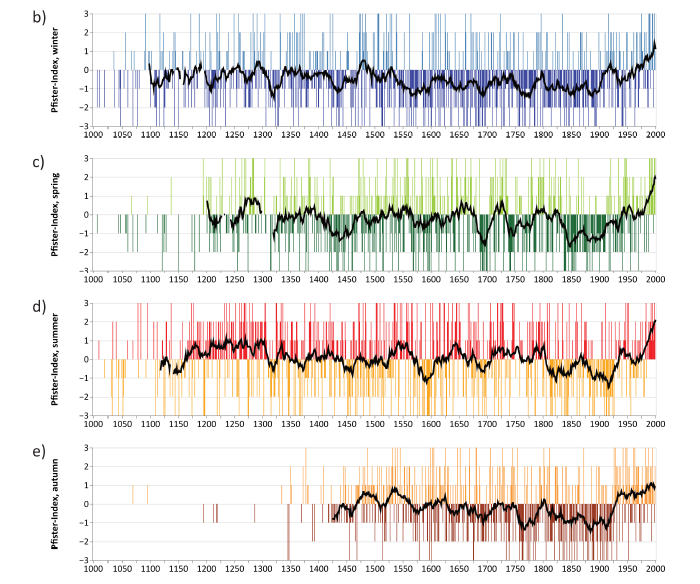
Seasonal temperatures in Central Europe (winter > spring > summer > autumn), CE 1000 to 1999 in the form of Pfister Indices

In 2021, historian Christian Pfister and climatologist Heinz Wanner published a reconstruction of seasonal temperatures in Central Europe using temperature indices (historical climatology) based on documentary data. After CE 1500, the reconstruction is based on an article by Czech geographer Petr Dobrovolny, which includes monthly, seasonal and annual temperature estimates for Germany, Switzerland and the Czech lands based on temperature indices up to 1759 and subsequent temperature measurements.

===== Winter =====
Winters from 1000 to 1999 were generally cold until the end of the 19th century. A reconstruction of winter temperatures on a year-by-year basis from 1170 onward reveals a different picture of the Little Ice Age.

The 13th-century winters were predominantly cold only in the first third of the century, as well as between 1270 and 1280.

During the 14th century, cold winters were the norm, except for the 37 years between 1340 and 1377.

The 15th century was almost entirely cold, except for the 1470s. Until 1520, winters remained mostly cold.

During the 16th century, cold and warm seasons were balanced until 1540. After that, cold winters became the norm, with particularly severe winters occurring between 1565 and 1573 and again from 1587 to 1595. Overall, winter seasons were around 0.9 °C (±0.69 °C) below the 1961–1990 average.

During the 17th century, temperatures were 1.2°C (±0.69°C) below average.

During the 18th century, temperatures were 0.9°C (±0.69°C) below average.

During the 19th century, temperatures were 1.2°C below average based on thermometric measurements.

The 20th-century temperatures were 0.2°C below the 1961–1990 average, with positive values dominating after 1950.

Conclusion: The duration and intensity of cold spells in winter have increased since the 14th century, peaking in the 15th, 17th, and 19th centuries. The gradual decline in winter temperatures until the early 20th century, compared to the 1961–1990 measurement period, was one manifestation of the end of the Little Ice Age in Central Europe due to Global Warming.

===== Summer =====
14th-century summers were slightly cooler than warm ones in the 14th century. The years from 1324 to 1340 and from 1380 to 1399 were predominantly warm, whereas the years from 1314 to 1322 and from 1355 to 1370 were mostly cold. The latter cold period triggered an advance of the Alpine glaciers, reaching its peak in the 1380s.

Cold summers predominated in the 15th century. After a relatively warm period until 1424, the trend reversed. Seven cold summers occurred in the 1450s alone, presumably in connection with the eruption of a tropical volcano (Kuwae). Also notable is the sequence of three hot summers between 1471 and 1473.

During the 16th century, estimated temperatures were 0.2 °C (±0.49 °C) below the 1961–1990 average. Due to ten hot and dry summers, temperatures from 1534 to 1567 were 0.3 °C (±0.49 °C) above average, causing the glaciers to melt back somewhat. Subsequently, temperatures fell in conjunction with high summer precipitation, reaching a low point in the 1590s and triggering the widespread advance of Alpine glaciers.

During the 17th century, estimated temperatures were 0.2°C (±0.49°C) lower than the average for the period 1961–1990. Until around 1630 and from 1670 to 1685, extremes of cold and warmth dominated, with warm summers occurring mid-century. After 1675, temperatures fell by an average of 0.6 °C until the turn of the century. Cod, which is sensitive to cold temperatures, disappeared from the waters around the Faroe Islands. The English climatologist and historian Hubert Lamb concluded that cold Arctic water had spread southwards.

Warm summers prevailed during the 18th century, particularly between 1718 and 1731. Temperatures remained relatively low between 1760 and 1779, triggering an advance of the Alpine glaciers.

Cold summers prevailed during the 19th century. Average temperatures in Central Europe were 0.6 °C below the 1961–1990 average. The first half of the century was predominantly cold, leading to glacier advances.

In the 20th century, summers in Central Europe remained cold until 1927. Temperatures then rose until the warm decade from 1943 to 1952, after which they fluctuated around the 1901–1960 average. The long-term process of glacier retreat began with the gradual anthropogenic warming of the late 19th century and accelerated with the more rapid warming that occurred after 1990.

===== Regional studies =====
Drangajökull, Iceland's northernmost glacier, reached its maximum extent during the LIA around 1665 or 1765.

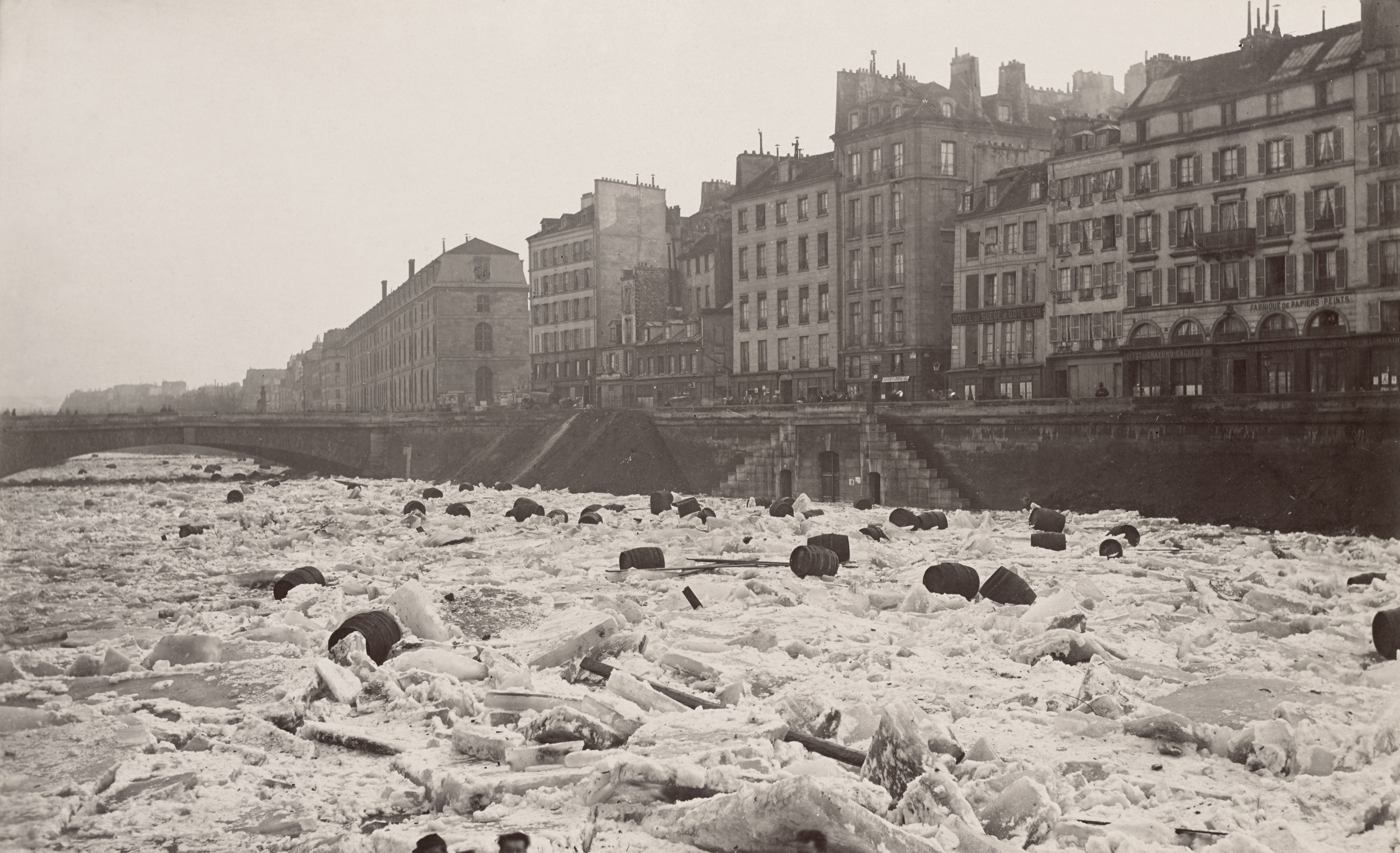
The Seine frozen, 3 January 1880. At the end of the 19th century, the climate was still colder than today.

The Baltic Sea froze over twice, in 1303 and 1306–1307, and years followed of "unseasonable cold, storms and rains, and a rise in the level of the Caspian Sea". The Little Ice Age brought colder winters to parts of Europe and North America. Farms and villages in the Swiss Alps were destroyed by encroaching glaciers during the mid-17th century. Canals and rivers in Great Britain and the Netherlands were frequently frozen deeply enough to support ice skating and winter festivals. As trade needed to continue during the prolonged winter often spanning 5 months, merchants equipped their boer style boats with planks and skates (runners), hence the iceboat was born. The first River Thames frost fair was in 1608 and the last in 1814. Changes to the bridges and the addition of the Thames Embankment have affected the river's flow and depth and greatly diminish the possibility of further freezes.

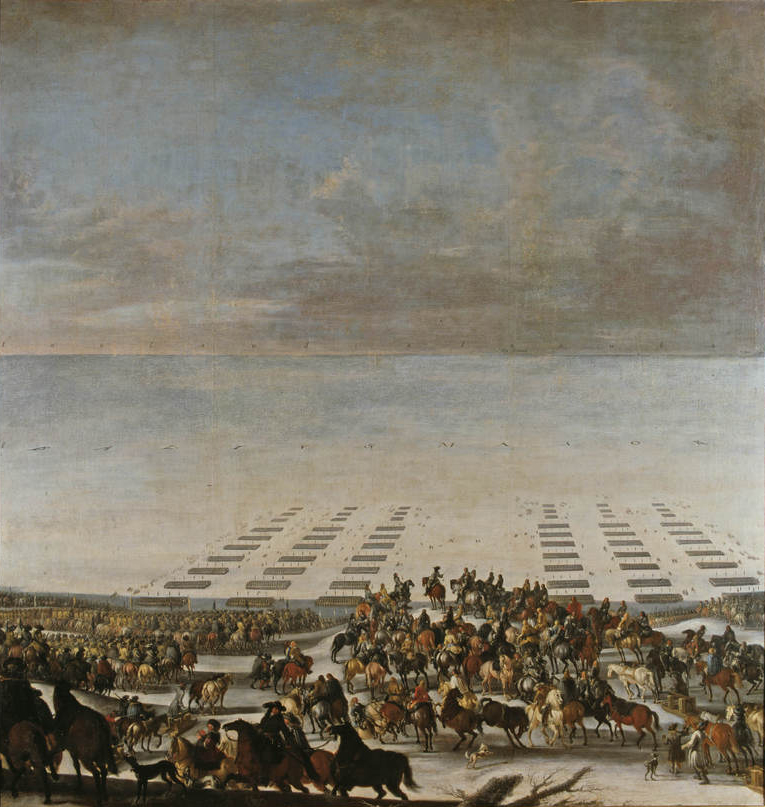
March Across the Belts, 1658

In early 1658, a Swedish army took advantage of the extremely cold winter to march through Denmark and across the Great Belt to attack Copenhagen from the west.

Sea ice surrounding Iceland extended for miles in every direction and closed harbors to shipping. The population of Iceland fell by half, but that may have been caused by skeletal fluorosis after the eruption of Laki in 1783. Iceland also suffered failures of cereal crops and people moved away from a grain-based diet.

After Greenland's climate became colder and stormier around 1250, the diet of the Norse Viking settlements there steadily shifted away from agricultural sources. By around 1300, seal hunting provided over three quarters of their food. By 1350, there was reduced demand for their exports, and trade with Europe fell away. The last document from the settlements dates from 1412, and over the following decades, the remaining Europeans left in what seems to have been a gradual withdrawal, which was caused mainly by economic factors such as increased availability of farms in Scandinavian countries. Greenland was largely cut off by ice from 1410 to the 1720s.

Between 1620 and 1740, the Yzeron Basin in the Massif Central of France witnessed a phase of decreased fluvial activity. This decline in fluvial activity is believed to be linked to a multidecennial phase of droughts in the western Mediterranean.

In southwestern Europe, a negative North Atlantic oscillation (NAO) combined with increased aridity caused an increase in wind-driven sediment deposition during the LIA.

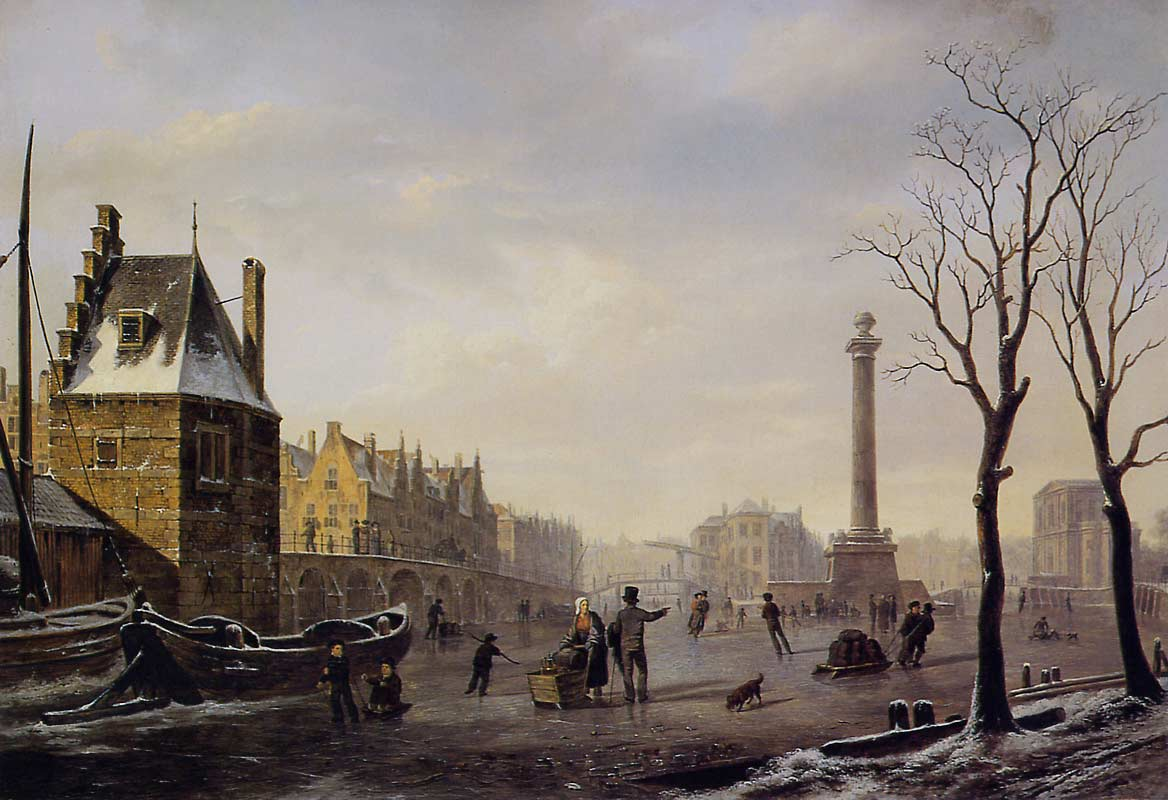
Winter skating on the main canal of Pompenburg, Rotterdam in 1825, shortly before the minimum, by Bartholomeus Johannes van Hove

In his 1995 book, the early climatologist Hubert Lamb said that in many years, "snowfall was much heavier than recorded before or since, and the snow lay on the ground for many months longer than it does today." In Lisbon, Portugal, snowstorms were much more frequent than today, and one winter in the 17th century produced eight snowstorms. Many springs and summers were cold and wet but with great variability between years and groups of years. That was particularly evident during the "Grindelwald Fluctuation" (1560–1630); the rapid cooling phase was associated with more erratic weather, including increased storminess, unseasonal snowstorms, and droughts. Crop practices throughout Europe had to be altered to adapt to the shortened and less reliable growing season, and there were many years of scarcity and famine. One was the Great Famine of 1315–1317, but that may have been before the Little Ice Age. According to Elizabeth Ewan and Janay Nugent, "Famines in France 1693–94, Norway 1695–96 and Sweden 1696–97 claimed roughly 10 percent of the population of each country. In Estonia and Finland in 1696–97, losses have been estimated at a fifth and a third of the national populations, respectively." Viticulture disappeared from some northern regions, and storms caused serious flooding and loss of life. Some of them resulted in the permanent loss of large areas of land from the Danish, German, and Dutch coasts.

The violinmaker Antonio Stradivari produced his instruments during the Little Ice Age. The colder climate may have caused the wood that was used in his violins to be denser than in warmer periods and to contribute to the tone of his instruments. According to the science historian James Burke, the period inspired such novelties in everyday life as the widespread use of buttons and button-holes, as well as knitting of custom-made undergarments for the better covering and insulating of the body. Chimneys were invented to replace open fires in the centre of communal halls to allow houses with multiple rooms to have the separation of masters from servants.

The Little Ice Age, by the anthropologist Brian Fagan of the University of California at Santa Barbara, describes the plight of European peasants from 1300 to 1850: famines, hypothermia, bread riots and the rise of despotic leaders brutalizing an increasingly dispirited peasantry. In the late 17th century, agriculture had dropped off dramatically: "Alpine villagers lived on bread made from ground nutshells mixed with barley and oat flour." Historian Wolfgang Behringer has linked intensive witch-hunting episodes in Europe to agricultural failures during the Little Ice Age.

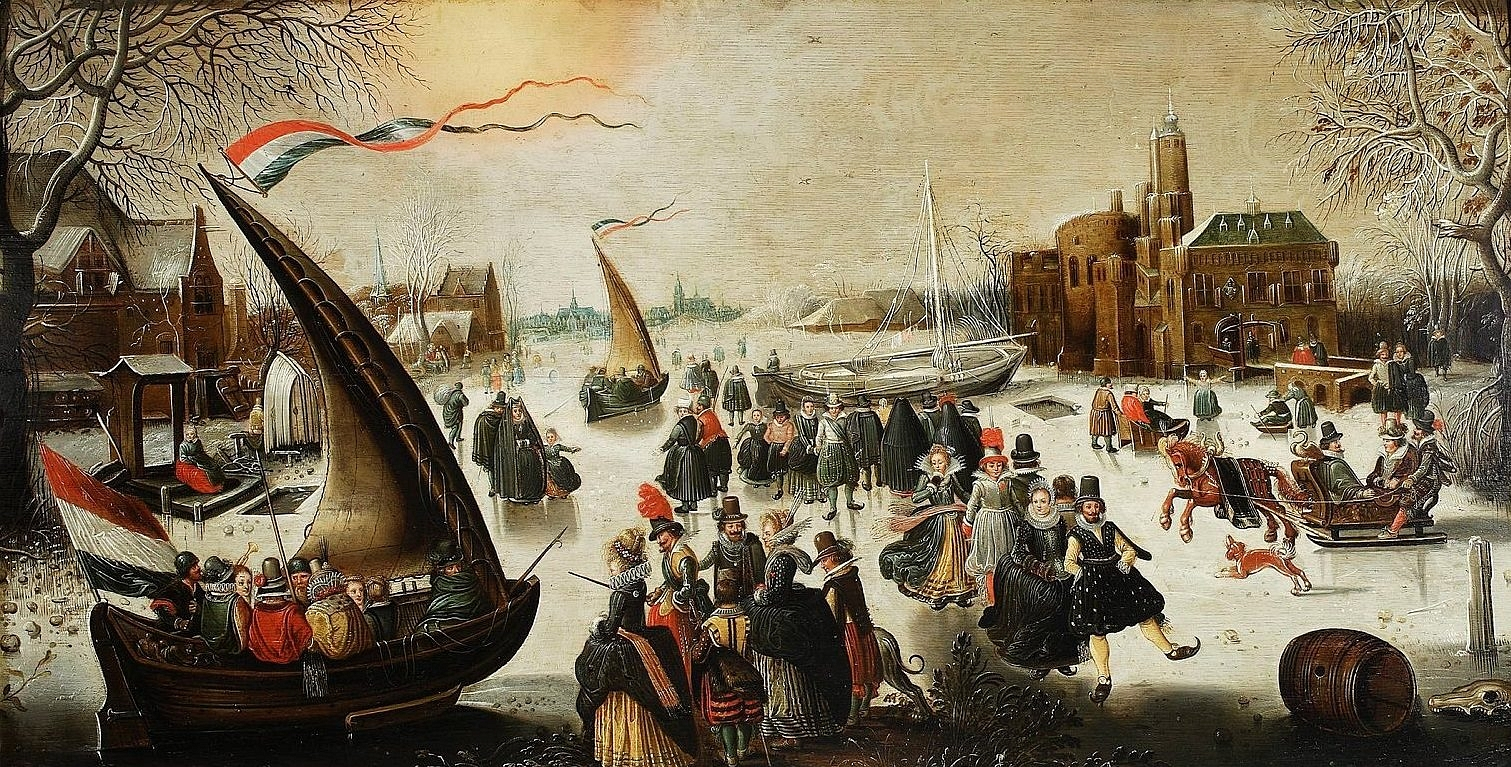
David Vinckboons, Winter Landscape with Skaters and Ice-Sailing (c. 1615)

The Frigid Golden Age, by the environmental historian Dagomar Degroot of Georgetown University, points out that some societies thrived, but others faltered during the Little Ice Age. In particular, the Little Ice Age transformed environments around the Dutch Republic and made them easier to exploit in commerce and conflict. The Dutch were resilient, even adaptive, in the face of weather that devastated neighboring countries. Merchants exploited harvest failures, military commanders took advantage of shifting wind patterns, and inventors developed technologies that helped them profit from the cold. The 17th-century Dutch Golden Age therefore owed much to its people's flexibility in coping with the changing climate.

==== Cultural responses ====
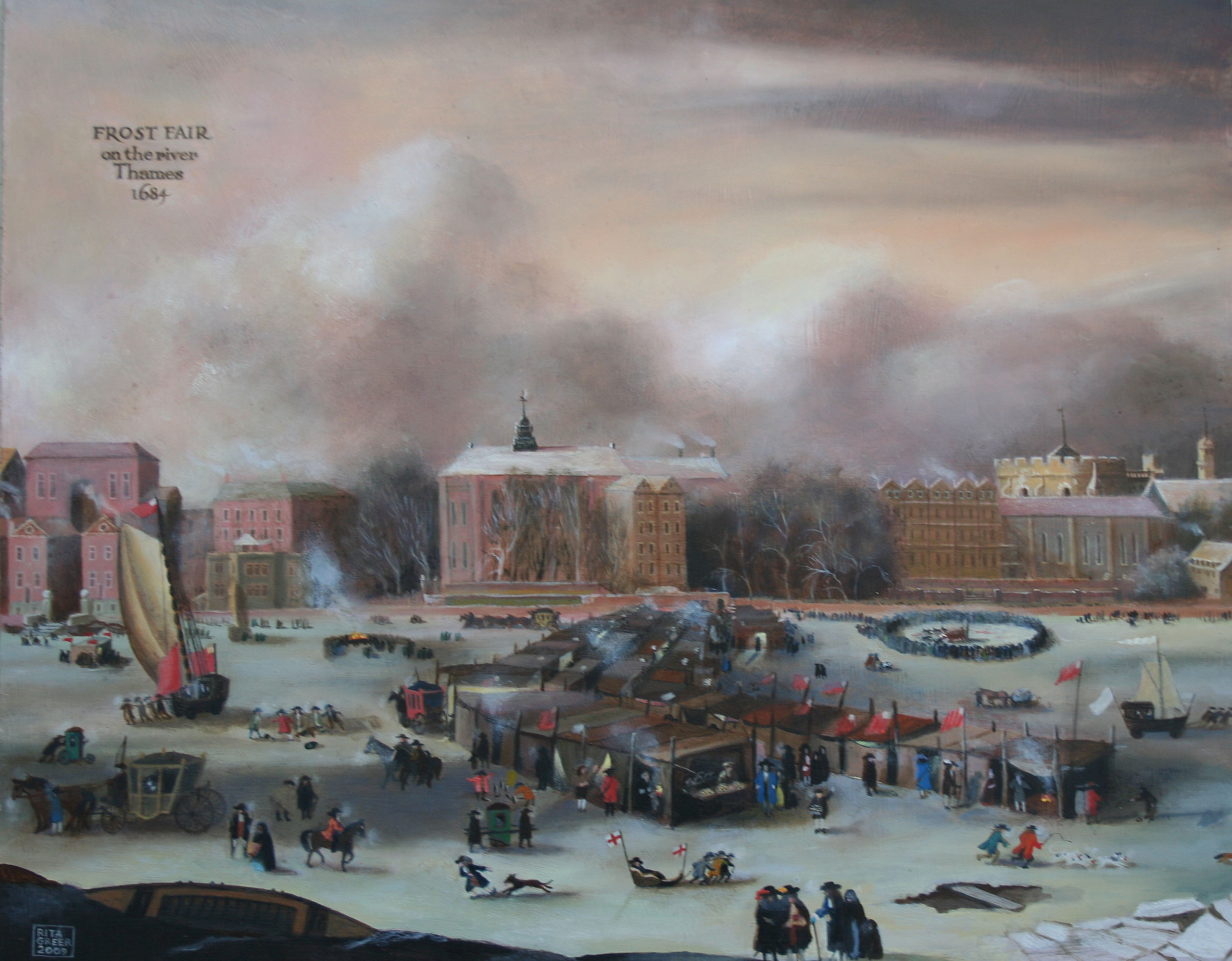
River Thames frost fair, 1684

Historians have argued that cultural responses to the consequences of the Little Ice Age in Europe consisted of violent scapegoating. The prolonged cold, dry periods brought drought upon many European communities and resulted in poor crop growth, poor livestock survival, and increased activity of pathogens and disease vectors. Disease intensified under the same conditions that unemployment and economic difficulties arose: prolonged cold, dry seasons. Disease and unemployment generated a lethal positive feedback loop. Although the communities had some contingency plans, such as better crop mixes, emergency grain stocks, and international food trade, they did not always prove effective. Communities often lashed out via violent crimes, including robbery and murder. Accusations of sexual offenses also increased, such as adultery, bestiality, and rape. Europeans sought explanations for the famine, disease, and social unrest that they were experiencing, and they blamed the innocent. Evidence from several studies indicate that increases in violent actions against marginalized groups, which were held responsible for the Little Ice Age, overlap with the years of particularly cold, dry weather.

One example of the violent scapegoating occurring during the Little Ice Age was the resurgence of witchcraft trials. Oster (2004) and Behringer (1999) argue that the resurgence was brought by the climatic decline. Prior to the Little Ice Age, witchcraft was considered an insignificant crime, and victims (the supposed witches) were rarely accused. But beginning in the 1380s, just as the Little Ice Age began, European populations began to link magic and weather-making. The first systematic witch hunts began in the 1430s, and by the 1480s it was widely believed that witches should be held accountable for poor weather. Witches were blamed for direct and indirect consequences of the Little Ice Age: livestock epidemics, cows that gave too little milk, late frosts, and unknown diseases. In general, the number of witchcraft trials rose as the temperature dropped, and trials decreased when temperature increased. The peaks of witchcraft persecutions overlap with the hunger crises that occurred in 1570 and 1580, the latter lasting a decade. The trials targeted primarily poor women, many of them widows. Not everybody agreed that witches should be persecuted for weather-making, but such arguments focused primarily not upon whether witches existed but upon whether witches had the capability to control the weather. The Catholic Church in the Early Middle Ages argued that witches could not control the weather because they were mortals, not God, but by the mid-13th century, most people agreed with the idea that witches could control natural forces.

Jewish populations were also blamed for climatic deterioration during the Little Ice Age. The Western European states experienced waves of antisemitism, directed against the main religious minority in their otherwise Christian societies. There was no direct link made between Jews and the weather; they were blamed only for indirect consequences such as disease. Outbreaks of the Black Death were often blamed on Jews. In Western European cities during the 1300s, Jewish populations were murdered to stop the spread of the plague. Rumors spread that Jews were either poisoning wells themselves, or telling lepers to poison the wells. To escape persecution, some Jews converted to Christianity, while others migrated to the Ottoman Empire, Italy, or the Holy Roman Empire, where they experienced greater toleration.

Some populations blamed the cold periods and the resulting famine and disease during the Little Ice Age on a general divine displeasure. Particular groups took the brunt of the burden in attempts to cure it. In Germany, regulations were imposed upon activities such as gambling and drinking, which disproportionately affected the lower class, and women were forbidden from showing their knees. Other regulations affected the wider population, such as prohibiting dancing, sexual activities and moderating food and drink intake. In Ireland, Catholics blamed the Reformation for the bad weather. The Annals of Loch Cé, in its entry for 1588, describes a midsummer snowstorm as "a wild apple was not larger than each stone of it" and blames it on the presence of a "wicked, heretical, bishop in Oilfinn", the Protestant Bishop of Elphin, John Lynch.

==== Depictions of winter in European painting ====
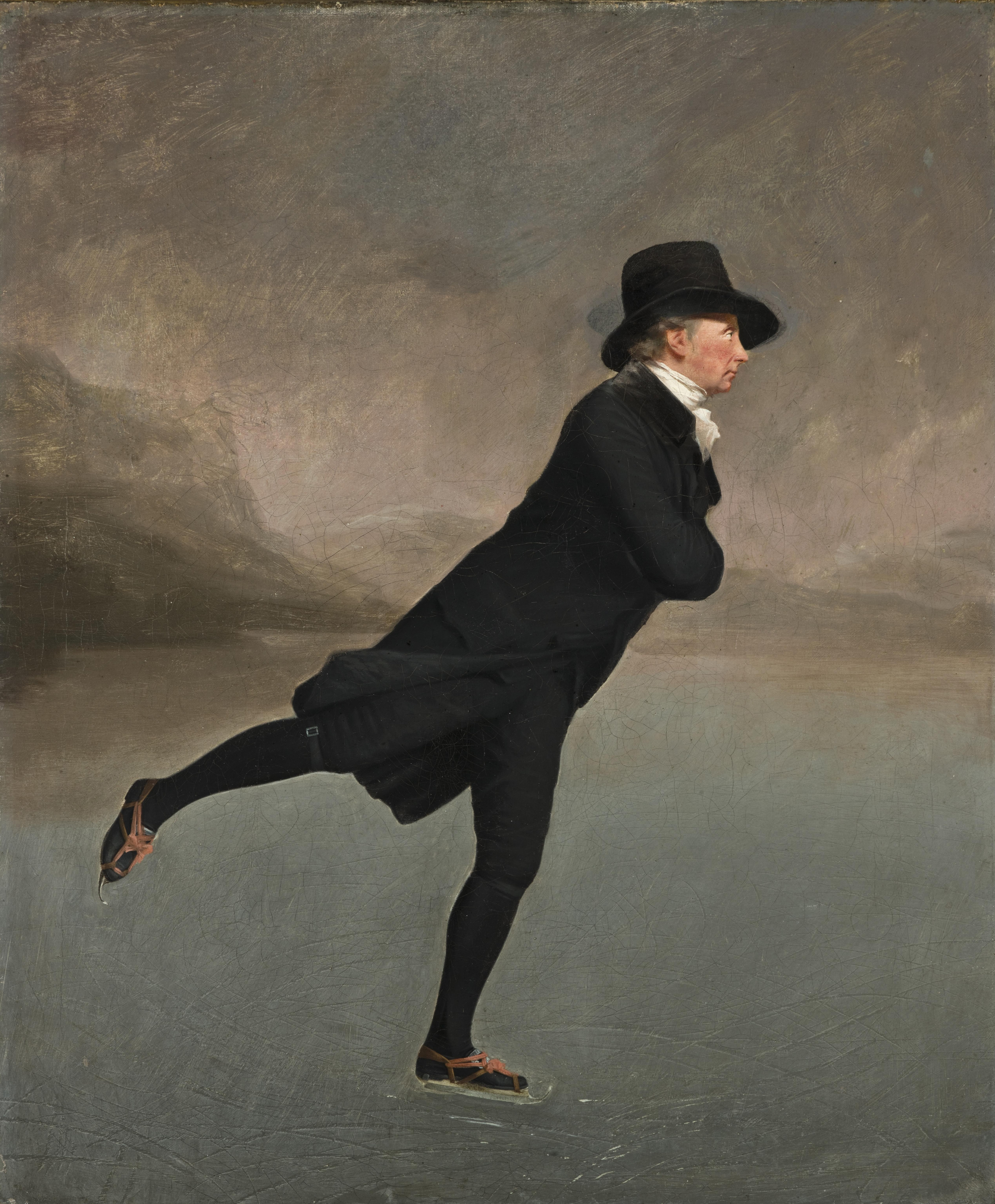
The Reverend Robert Walker Skating on Duddingston Loch, attributed to Henry Raeburn, 1790s

William James Burroughs analyzes the depiction of winter in paintings, as does Hans Neuberger. Burroughs asserts that it occurred almost entirely from 1565 to 1665 and was associated with the climatic decline from 1550 onwards. Burroughs claims that there had been almost no depictions of winter in art, and he "hypothesizes that the unusually harsh winter of 1565 inspired great artists to depict highly original images and that the decline in such paintings was a combination of the 'theme' having been fully explored and mild winters interrupting the flow of painting." Wintry scenes, which entail technical difficulties in painting, have been regularly and well handled since at least the early 15th century by artists in illuminated manuscript cycles that show the Labours of the Months, typically placed on the calendar pages of books of hours. January and February are typically shown as snowy, as in February in the famous cycle in the Très Riches Heures du Duc de Berry, painted in 1412–1416 and illustrated below. Since landscape painting had not yet developed as an independent genre in art, the absence of other winter scenes is not remarkable. On the other hand, snowy winter landscapes, particularly stormy seascapes, became artistic genres in the Dutch Golden Age painting during the coldest and stormiest decades of the Little Ice Age. Most modern scholars believe them to be full of symbolic messages and metaphors, which would have been clear to contemporary viewers.

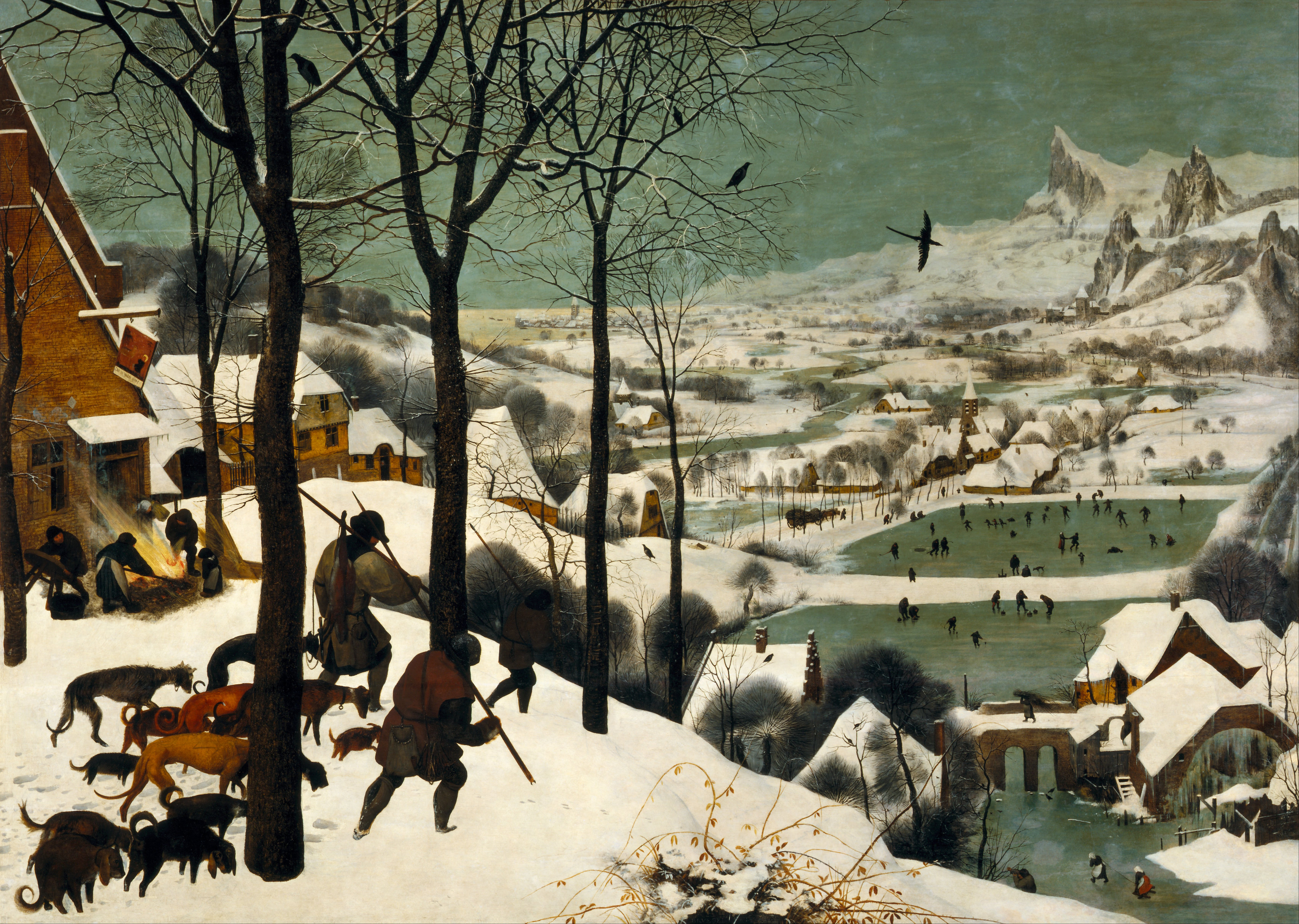
The Hunters in the Snow by Pieter Bruegel the Elder, 1565

All of the famous winter landscape paintings by Pieter Bruegel the Elder, such as The Hunters in the Snow and the Massacre of the Innocents, are thought to have been painted around 1565. His son Pieter Brueghel the Younger (1564–1638) also painted many snowy landscapes, but according to Burroughs, he "slavishly copied his father's designs. The derivative nature of so much of this work makes it difficult to draw any definite conclusions about the influence of the winters between 1570 and 1600". Bruegel the Elder painted Hunters in the Snow in Antwerp, so the mountains in the picture probably mean it was based on drawings or memories from crossing of the Alps during his trip to Rome in 1551–1552. It is one of 5 known surviving paintings, probably from a series of 6 or 12, known as "the Twelve Months", that Breugel was commissioned to paint by a wealthy patron in Antwerp, Nicolaes Jonghelinck (Hunters in the Snow being for January): none of the other four that survive show a snow-covered landscape and both The Hay Harvest (July) and The Harvesters (August) depict warm summer days. Even The Return of the Herd (thought to be the painting for November) and The Gloomy Day (known to be for February) show landscapes free of snow.

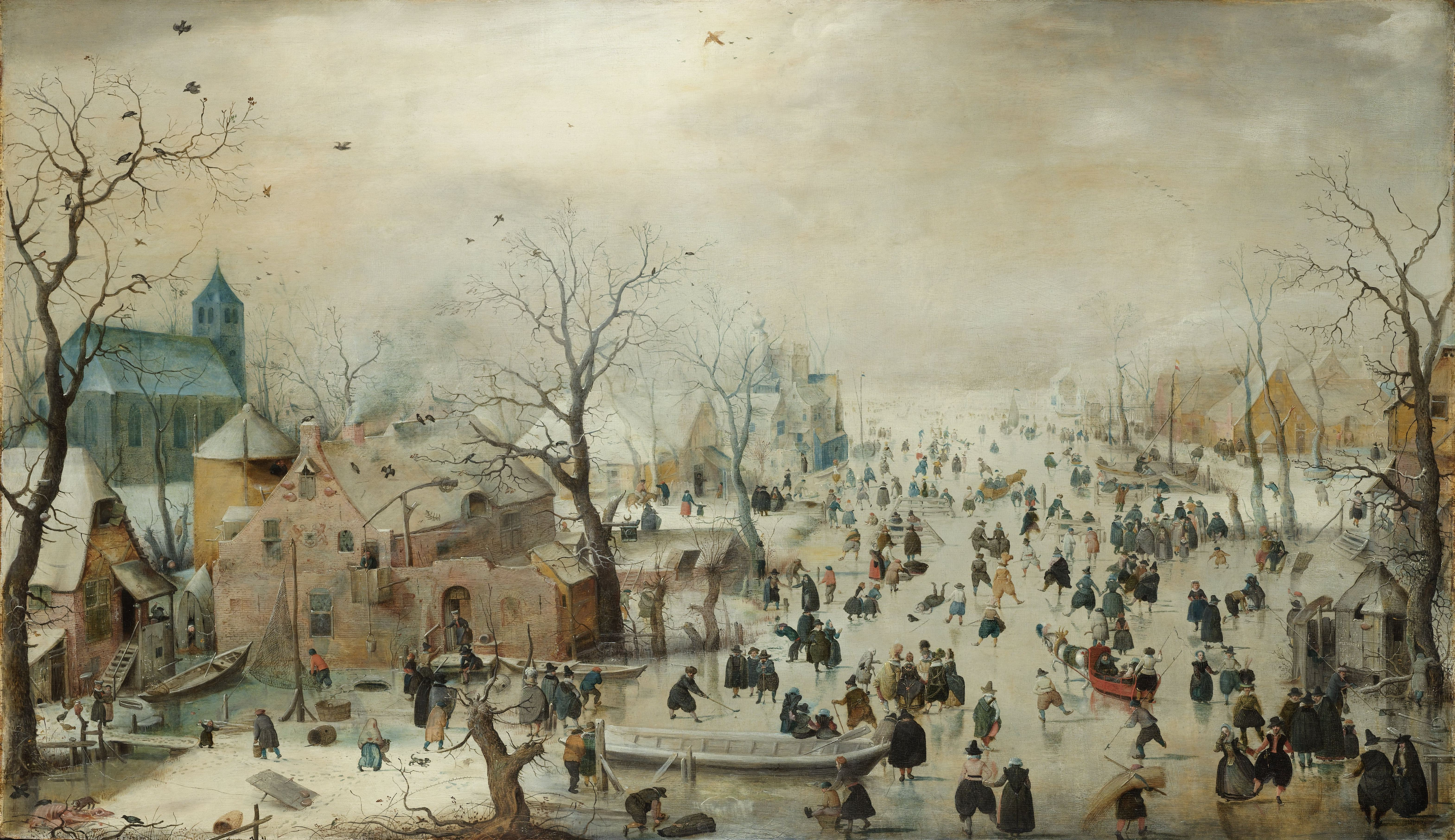
Winter landscape with iceskaters, c. 1608, Hendrick Avercamp

Burroughs says that snowy subjects return to Dutch Golden Age painting with works by Hendrick Avercamp from 1609 onwards. There is a hiatus between 1627 and 1640, which is before the main period of such subjects from the 1640s to the 1660s. That relates well with climate records for the later period. The subjects are less popular after about 1660, but that does not match any recorded reduction in severity of winters and may reflect only changes in taste or fashion. In the later period between the 1780s and 1810s, snowy subjects again became popular. Neuberger analyzed 12,000 paintings, held in American and European museums and dated between 1400 and 1967, for cloudiness and darkness. His 1970 publication shows an increase in such depictions that corresponds to the Little Ice Age, which peaks between 1600 and 1649.

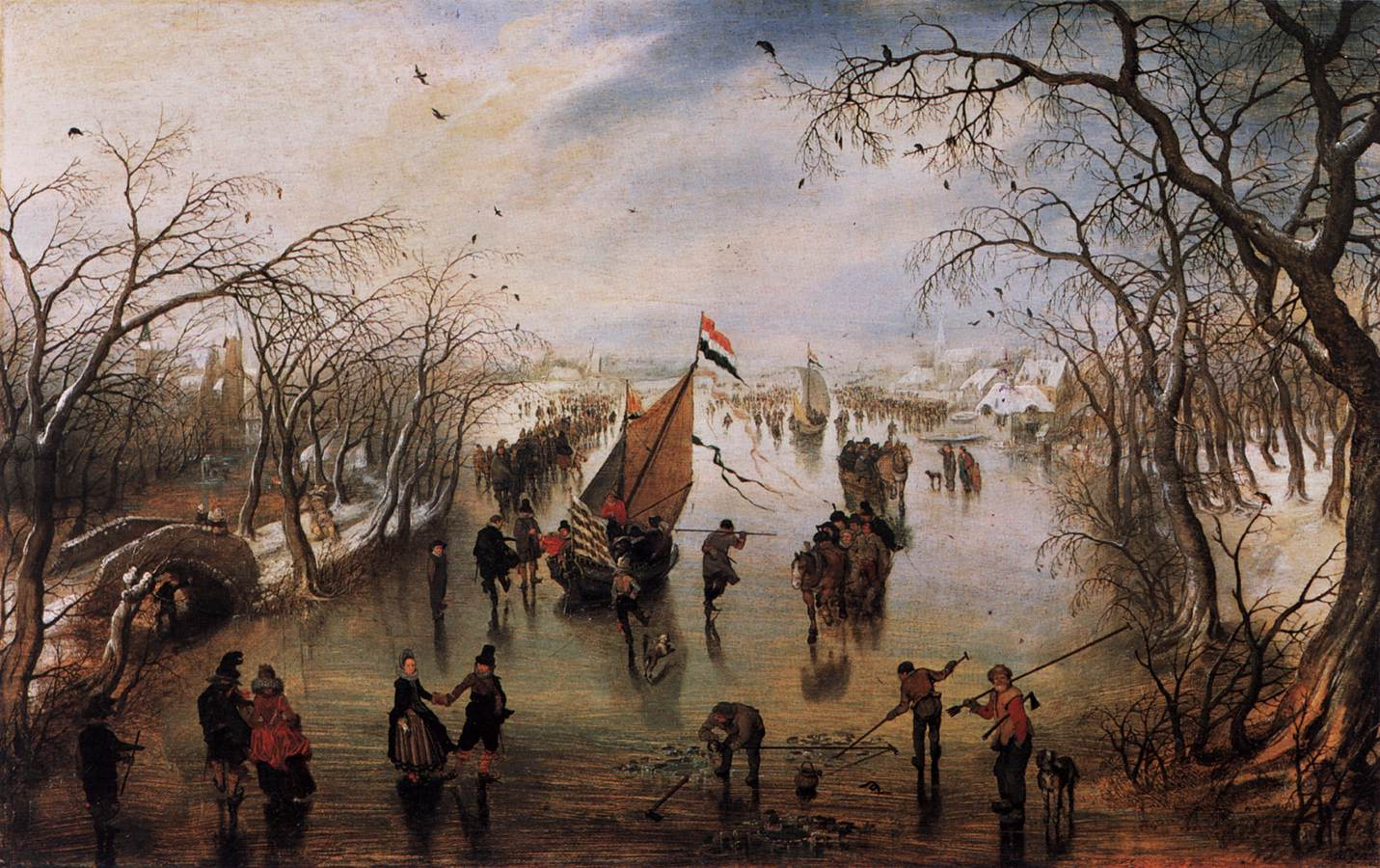
Winter (Adriaen van de Venne) 1614

Paintings and contemporary records in Scotland demonstrate that curling, ice skating and icesailing were popular outdoor winter sports, with curling dating to the 16th century and becoming widely popular in the mid-19th century. An outdoor curling pond constructed in Gourock in the 1860s remained in use for almost a century, but increasing use of indoor facilities, problems of vandalism, and milder winters led to the pond being abandoned in 1963.

==== General Crisis of the seventeenth century ====
The General Crisis of the seventeenth century in Europe was a period of inclement weather, crop failure, economic hardship, extreme intergroup violence, and high mortality linked to the Little Ice Age. Episodes of social instability track the cooling with a time lapse of up to 15 years, and many developed into armed conflicts, such as the Thirty Years' War (1618–1648). The war started as a war of succession to the Bohemian throne. Animosity between Protestants and Catholics in the Holy Roman Empire (most of which is now in Germany, Austria, and the Czech Republic) added fuel to the fire. It soon escalated to a huge conflict that involved all the major European powers and devastated much of Germany. When the war ended, some regions of the Holy Roman Empire had seen their population drop by as much as 70%.

=== North America ===
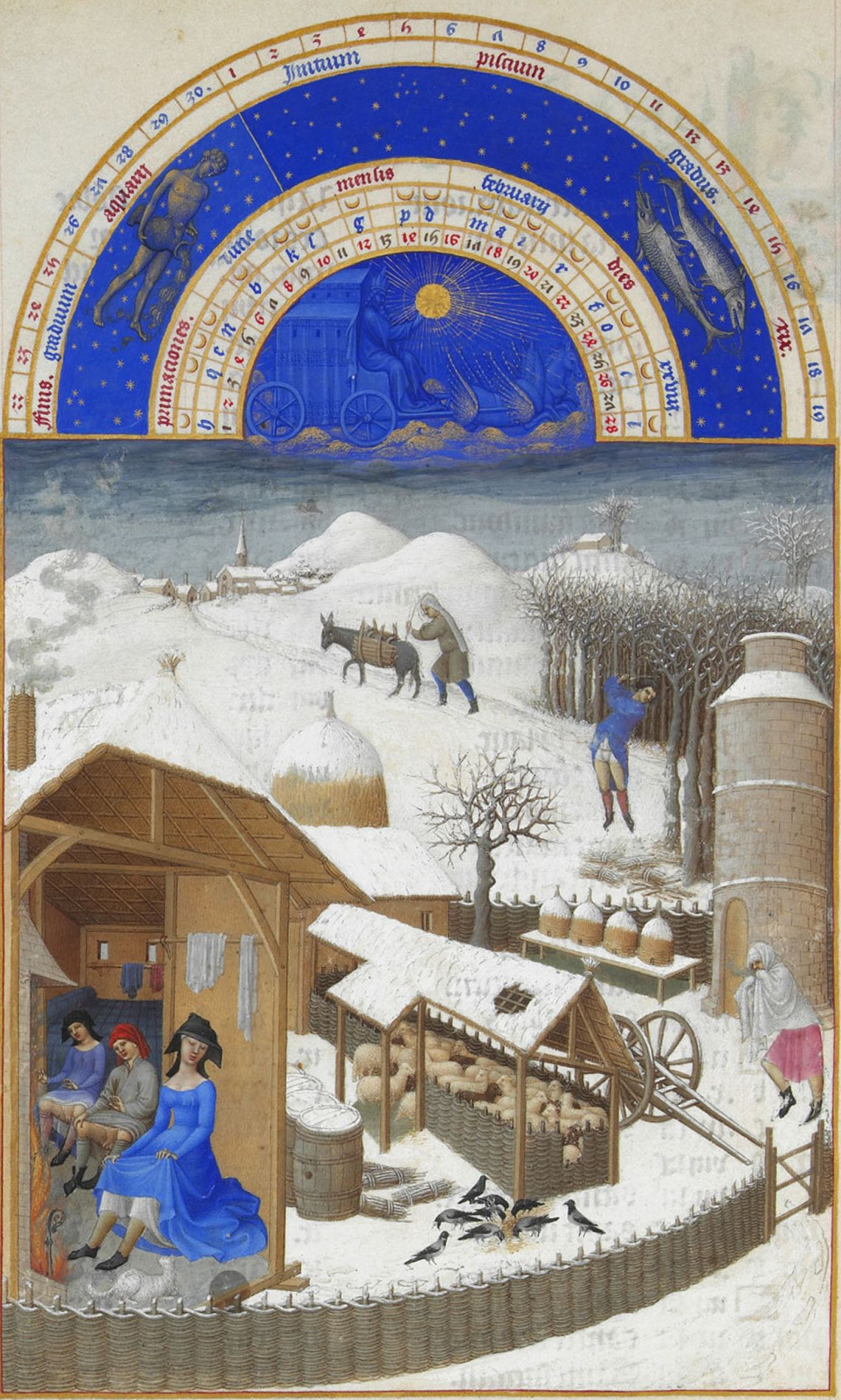
"February" from the calendar of the Très Riches Heures du Duc de Berry, 1412–1416

Early European explorers and settlers of North America reported exceptionally severe winters. In southwestern Alaska, preexisting flexibility in foraging habits among the native people lent itself to high adaptability to the LIA. Both Europeans and indigenous peoples suffered excess mortality in Maine during the winter of 1607–1608, and extreme frost was meanwhile reported in the Jamestown, Virginia, settlement. Native Americans formed leagues in response to food shortages. The journal of Pierre de Troyes, Chevalier de Troyes, who led an expedition to James Bay in 1686, recorded that the bay was still littered with so much floating ice that he could hide behind it in his canoe on 1 July. In the winter of 1780, New York Harbor froze, which allowed people to walk from Manhattan Island to Staten Island.

The extent of mountain glaciers had been mapped by the late 19th century. In the north and the south temperate zones, Equilibrium Line Altitude (the boundaries separating zones of net accumulation from those of net ablation) were about 100 metres (330 ft) lower than they were in 1975. Southwestern Alaska experienced a temperature nadir around 135 BP, and in south-central Alaska, mountain hemlock forests severely declined. In Glacier National Park, the last episode of glacier advance came in the late 18th and the early 19th centuries. In 1879, the famed naturalist John Muir found that Glacier Bay ice had retreated 48 miles (77 km). In Chesapeake Bay, Maryland, large temperature excursions were possibly related to changes in the strength of the North Atlantic thermohaline circulation.

Because the Little Ice Age took place during the European colonization of the Americas, it discouraged many early colonists, who had expected the climate of North America to be similar to the climate of Europe at similar latitudes. They found that North America, at least in what would become Canada and the northern United States, had hotter summers and colder winters than Europe. That effect was aggravated by the Little Ice Age, and unpreparedness led to the collapse of many early European settlements in North America.

Historians agree that when colonists settled at Jamestown, it was one of the coldest periods in the last 1000 years. Drought was also a problem in North America during the Little Ice Age, and the settlers arrived in Roanoke during the largest drought of the past 800 years. Tree ring studies by the University of Arkansas discovered that many colonists arrived at the beginning of a seven-year drought. The droughts also decreased the Native American populations and led to conflict because of food scarcity. English colonists at Roanoke forced Native Americans of Ossomocomuck to share their depleted supplies with them. That led to warfare between the two groups, and Native American towns were destroyed. That cycle would repeat itself many times at Jamestown. The combination of fighting and cold weather also led to the spread of diseases. The colder weather helped the parasites brought by Europeans in mosquitoes to develop faster. That in turn led to many malaria deaths among Native Americans.

Thomas Gorges wrote that between 1637 and 1645, colonists in Maine (then part of Massachusetts) experienced horrendous weather conditions. In June 1637, temperatures were so high that numerous European settlers died; travelers were forced to travel at night to stay cool. Gorges also wrote that the winter of 1641–1642 was "piercingly Intolerable" and that no Englishman or Native American had ever seen anything like it. He also stated that the Massachusetts Bay had frozen as far as one could see, and that horse carriages now roamed where ships used to be. He stated that the summers of 1638 and 1639 were very short, cold, and wet, which compounded food scarcity for a few years. To make matters worse, creatures like caterpillars and pigeons fed on crops and devastated harvests. Every year about which Gorges wrote featured unusual weather patterns, including high precipitation, drought, and extreme cold or heat.

Many inhabitants of North America had their own theories about the extreme weather. The colonist Ferdinando Gorges blamed the cold weather on cold ocean winds. Humphrey Gilbert tried to explain Newfoundland's icy and foggy weather by saying that the Earth drew cold vapors from the ocean and drew them west. Many others had their own theories for North America being so much colder than Europe; their observations and hypotheses offer insight on the Little Ice Age's effects in North America.

=== Mesoamerica ===
An analysis of several climate proxies undertaken in Mexico's Yucatán Peninsula, which was linked by its authors to Maya and Aztec chronicles relating periods of cold and drought, supports the existence of the Little Ice Age in the region. Cold and drought led to a terrible famine in the Aztec Empire in 1454 and the Chilam Balam Book of Mani mentions a decrease in temperature between 1441 and 1460 during the final years of Mayapan.

Another study conducted in several sites in Mesoamerica like Los Tuxtlas and Lake Pompal in Veracruz, Mexico show a decrease in human activity in the area during the Little Ice Age. That was proven by studying charcoal fragments and the amount of maize pollen taken from sedimentary samples by using a nonrotatory piston corer. The samples also showed volcanic activity which caused forest regeneration between 650 and 800. The instances of volcanic activity near Lake Pompal indicate varying temperatures, not a continuous coldness, during the Little Ice Age in Mesoamerica.

=== Atlantic Ocean ===
In the North Atlantic, sediments accumulated since the end of the last ice age, which occurred nearly 12,000 years ago, show regular increases in the amount of coarse sediment grains deposited from icebergs melting in the now-open ocean, indicating a series of 1–2 °C (2–4 °F) cooling events that recur every 1,500 years or so. The most recent cooling event was the Little Ice Age. The same cooling events are detected in sediments accumulating off Africa, but the cooling events appear to be larger: 3–8 °C (5–14 °F). δ^{18}O values from chironomid remains in the Azores reflect the cooling of the LIA.

=== Asia ===
Although the original designation of a Little Ice Age referred to the reduced temperature of Europe and North America, there is some evidence of extended periods of cooling outside those regions although it is not clear whether they are related or independent events. Mann states:

While there is evidence that many other regions outside Europe exhibited periods of cooler conditions, expanded glaciation, and significantly altered climate conditions, the timing and nature of these variations are highly variable from region to region, and the notion of the Little Ice Age as a globally synchronous cold period has all but been dismissed.

In China, warm-weather crops such as oranges were abandoned in Jiangxi Province, where they had been grown for centuries. Also, the two periods of most frequent typhoon strikes in Guangdong coincide with two of the coldest and driest periods in northern and central China (1660–1680, 1850–1880). Scholars have argued that one of the reasons for the fall of the Ming dynasty may have been the droughts and famines that were caused by the Little Ice Age.

There are debates on the start date and the periods of Little Ice Age's effects. Most scholars agree on categorizing the Little Ice Age period into three distinct cold periods: in 1458–1552, 1600–1720, and 1840–1880. According to data from the U.S. National Oceanic and Atmospheric Administration, the eastern monsoon area of China was the earliest to experience the effects of the Little Ice Age, from 1560 to 1709. In the western region of China surrounding the Tibetan Plateau, the effects of the Little Ice Age lagged behind the eastern region, with significant cold periods from 1620 to 1749. As the Medieval Warm Period transitioned into the Little Ice Age, the East Asian Summer Monsoon (EASM) became much weaker and the summer monsoon limit (SML) migrated southeastwards. Southwestern China became significantly colder and drier as a result of the weakening of the EASM caused by the decreased pressure gradient resulting from the cooling of the southern Eurasian landmass, while northwestern China, dominated by westerlies, saw an increase in precipitation.

The temperature changes were unprecedented for the farming communities in China. According to Coching Chu's 1972 study, the Little Ice Age from the end of the Ming dynasty to the start of the Qing dynasty (1650–1700) was one of the coldest periods in recorded Chinese history. Many major droughts during the summer months were recorded, and significant freezing events occurred during the winter months. That greatly worsened the food supply during the Ming dynasty.

This period of Little Ice Age corresponded to the period's major historical events. The Jurchen people lived in Northern China and formed a tributary state to the Ming dynasty and its Wanli Emperor. From 1573 to 1620, Manchuria experienced famine caused by extreme snowfall, which depleted agriculture production and devastated the livestock population. Scholars have argued that it had been caused by the temperature drops during the Little Ice Age. Despite the lack of food production, the Wanli Emperor ordered the Jurchens to pay the same amount of tribute each year. That led to anger and sowed seeds to the rebellion against the Ming dynasty. In 1616, Jurchens established the Later Jin dynasty. Led by Hong Taiji and Nurhaci, the Later Jin dynasty moved South and achieved decisive victories in battles against the Ming dynasty's military, such as during the 1618 Battle of Fushun.

After the earlier defeats and the death of the Wanli Emperor, the Chongzhen Emperor took over China and continued the war effort. From 1632 to 1641, the Little Ice Age began to cause drastic climate changes in the Ming dynasty's territories. For example, rainfall in the Huabei region dropped by 11% to 47% from the historical average. Meanwhile, the Shaanbei region, along the Yellow River experienced six major floods, which ruined cities such as Yan'an. The climate factored heavily in weakening the government's control over China and accelerated the fall of the Ming dynasty. In 1644, Li Zicheng led the Later Jin's forces into Beijing, overthrew the Ming dynasty, and established the short-lived Shun dynasty which were soon overthrown by Qing dynasty.

During the early years of the Qing dynasty, the Little Ice Age continued to have a significant impact on Chinese society. During the rule of the Kangxi Emperor (1661–1722), most Qing territories were still much colder than the historical average. However, the Kangxi Emperor pushed reforms and managed to increase the socio-economic recovery from the natural disasters. He benefited partly from the peacefulness of the early Qing dynasty. That essentially marked the end of the Little Ice Age in China and led to a more prosperous era of Chinese history that is known as the High Qing era.

In the Himalayas, the general assumption is that the cooling events were synchronous with those in Europe during the Little Ice Age because of the characteristics of moraines. However, applications of Quaternary dating methods such as surface exposure dating have shown that glacial maxima occurred between 1300 and 1600, slightly earlier than the recorded coldest period in the Northern Hemisphere. Many large Himalayan glacial debris fields have remained close to their limits since the Little Ice Age. The Himalayas also experienced an increase in snowfall at higher altitudes, which results in a southward shift in the Indian summer monsoon and an increase in precipitation. Overall, the increase in winter precipitation may have caused some glacial movements. Since the end of the Little Ice Age, there has been an almost continuous retreat of glaciers to present.

The region in Balochistan became colder, and its native Baloch people started a mass migration and began to settle along the Indus River in Sindh and Punjab.

On Rebun Island, a rapid cooling event occurred around 390 BP (as measured from pollen samples in 2018) amidst a longer-term trend of cooling; this cooling event marked the onset of the Little Ice Age in the region.

=== Africa ===
The Little Ice Age influenced the African climate from the 14th to the 19th centuries. Despite variances throughout the continent, a general trend of declining temperatures in Africa led to an average cooling of 1 °C.

In Ethiopia and North Africa, permanent snow was reported on mountain peaks at levels at which it does not occur today. Timbuktu, an important city on the trans-Saharan caravan route, was flooded at least 13 times by the Niger River, but there are no records of similar flooding before or since that time.

Several paleoclimatic studies of Southern Africa have suggested significant changes in relative changes in climate and environmental conditions. In Southern Africa, sediment cores retrieved from Lake Malawi show colder conditions between 1570 and 1820, which "further support, and extend, the global expanse of the Little Ice Age". A novel 3,000-year temperature reconstruction method, based on the rate of stalagmite growth in a cold cave in South Africa, further suggests a cold period from 1500 to 1800 "characterizing the South African Little Ice Age". The δ18O stalagmite record temperature reconstruction over a 350-year period (1690–1740) suggests that South Africa may have been the coldest region in Africa and have cooled by as much as 1.4 °C in summer. Also, the solar magnetic and Niño-Southern Oscillation cycles may have been key drivers of climate variability in the subtropical region. Periglacial features in the eastern Lesotho Highlands might have been reactivated by the Little Ice Age. Another archaeological reconstruction of Southern Africa reveals the rise of Great Zimbabwe because of ecological advantages from the increased rainfall over other competitor societies, such as the Mapungubwe. Pollen records derived from rock hyrax middens in the Cederberg Mountains of southwestern South Africa indicate an increase in humidity in the region at the start of the LIA.

Other than temperature variability, data from equatorial East Africa suggest impacts to the hydrologic cycle in the late 1700s. Historical data reconstructions from ten major African lakes indicate that an episode of *drought and desiccation" occurred throughout East Africa. The period showed drastic reductions in the depths of lakes, which were transformed into desiccated puddles. It is very likely that locals could cross Lake Chad, among others, and that bouts of "intense droughts were ubiquitous". That indicates local societies were probably launched into long migrations and warfare with neighboring tribes, since agriculture was made virtually useless by the dry soil.

=== Antarctica ===
CO_{2} mixing ratios at Law Dome

Kreutz et al. (1997) compared results from studies of West Antarctic ice cores with the Greenland Ice Sheet Project Two GISP2; they suggested a synchronous global cooling. An ocean sediment core from the eastern Bransfield Basin in the Antarctic Peninsula shows centennial events, which the authors link to the Little Ice Age and to the Medieval Warm Period. The authors note that "other unexplained climatic events comparable in duration and amplitude to the LIA and MWP events also appear".

The Siple Dome (SD) had a climate event with an onset time that is coincident with that of the Little Ice Age in the North Atlantic, based on a correlation with the GISP2 record. The Little Ice Age is the most dramatic climate event in the SD Holocene glaciochemical record. The Siple Dome ice core also contained its highest rate of melt layers (up to 8%) between 1550 and 1700, most likely because of warm summers. Law Dome ice cores show lower levels of CO_{2} mixing ratios from 1550 to 1800, which Etheridge and Steele believe to be "probably as a result of colder global climate".

Sediment cores in Bransfield Basin, Antarctic Peninsula, have neoglacial indicators by diatom and sea-ice taxa variations during the Little Ice Age. Stable isotope records from the Mount Erebus Saddle ice core site suggests that the Ross Sea region experienced average temperatures 1.6 ± 1.4 °C cooler during the Little Ice Age than the last 150 years.

=== Australia and New Zealand ===
Due to its location in the Southern Hemisphere, Australia did not experience a regional cooling like that of Europe or North America. Instead, the Australian Little Ice Age was characterized by humid, rainy climates, which were followed by drying and aridification in the 19th century.

As studied by Tibby et al. (2018), lake records from Victoria, New South Wales, and Queensland suggest that conditions in the east and the south-east of Australia were wet and unusually cool from the 16th to the early 19th centuries. That corresponds with the "peak" of the global Little Ice Age from 1594 to 1722. For example, North Stradbroke Island's Swallow Lagoon data reveals a period of persistent wetness from 1500 to 1850 CE (exceeding 300 mm above average), followed by a significant decrease in rainfall after 1891. The rainfalls significantly reduced after around 1890. Similarly, the hydrological records of Lake Surprise's salinity levels reveal high humidity levels around from 1440 to 1880, and an increase in salinity from 1860 to 1880 points to a negative change to the once-humid climate. The mid-19th century marked a notable change to eastern Australia's rainfall and humidity patterns.

Tibby et al. (2018) note that in eastern Australia, the paleoclimatic changes of the Little Ice Age in the late 1800s coincided with the agricultural changes resulting from European colonization. After the 1788 establishment of British colonies in the Australia, which were concentrated primarily in the eastern regions and cities like Sydney and later Melbourne and Brisbane, the British introduced new agricultural practices like pastoralism. Such practices required widespread deforestation and clearance of vegetation. Pastoralism and the clearing of land are captured in works of art such as the 1833 painting by the prominent landscape artist John Glover Patterdale Landscape with Cattle.

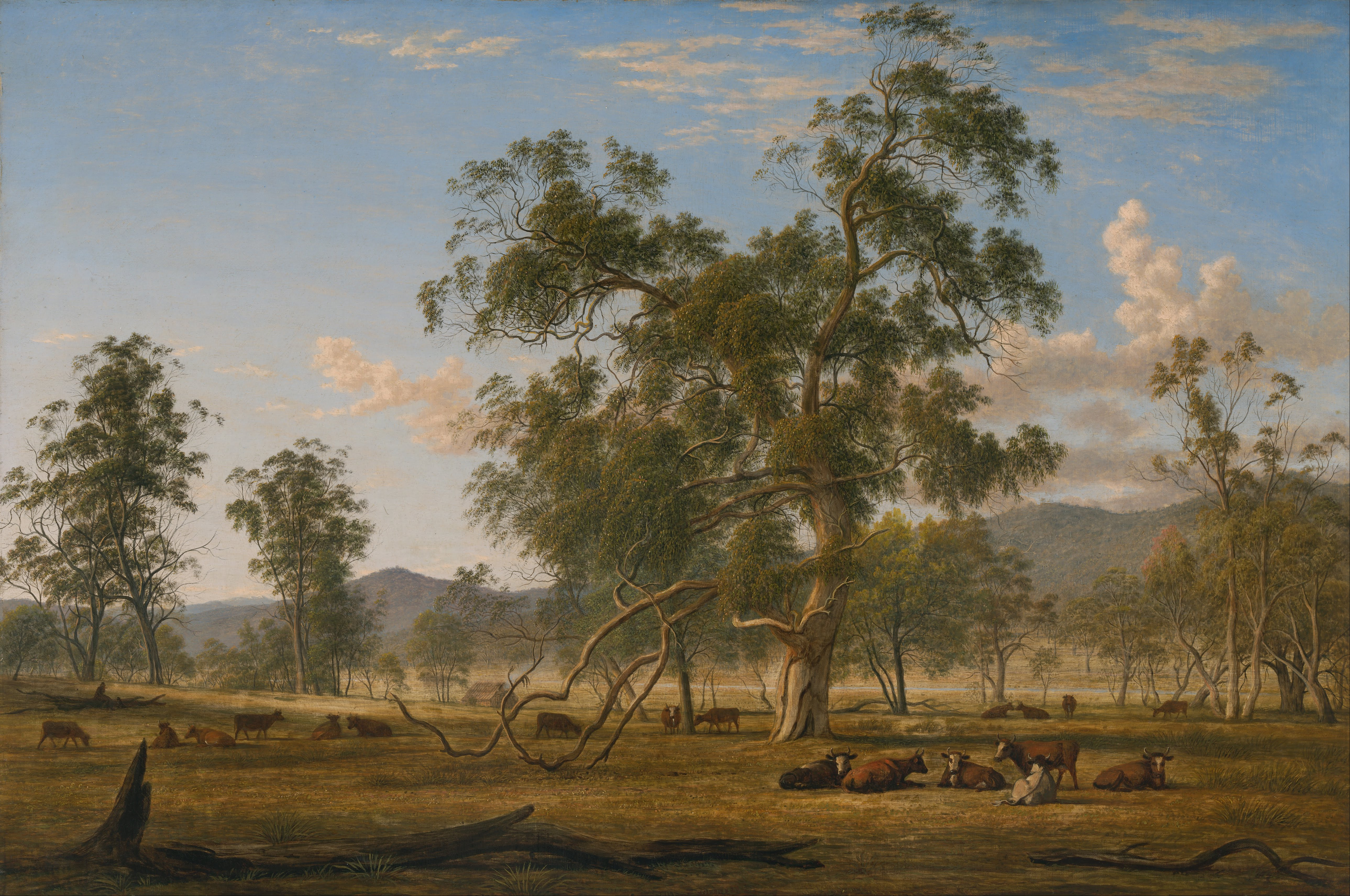
Patterdale Landscape with Cattle (1833) by John Glover depicts agricultural practices like pastoralism, which contributed to the aridification of Australia's late Little Ice Age.

Over the next century, the deforestation led to a loss of biodiversity, wind and water-based soil erosion, and soil salinity. Furthermore, as argued by Gordan et al. (2003), such land and vegetation clearance in Australia resulted in a 10% reduction in the transport of water vapor to the atmosphere. That occurred in Western Australia as well, where 19th-century land clearing resulted in reduced rainfall over the region. By 1850 to 1890, those human agricultural practices, which were concentrated in eastern Australia, had most likely amplified the drying and aridification that marked the end of the Little Ice Age.

In the north, evidence suggests fairly dry conditions, but coral cores from the Great Barrier Reef show rainfall similar to today but with less variability. A study that analyzed isotopes in Great Barrier Reef corals suggested that increased water vapor transport from the southern tropical oceans to the poles contributed to the Little Ice Age. Borehole reconstructions from Australia suggest that over the last 500 years, the 17th century was the coldest on the continent. The borehole temperature reconstruction method further indicates that the warming of Australia over the past five centuries is only around half that of the warming experienced by the Northern Hemisphere, which further proves that Australia did not reach the same depths of cooling as the continents in the north.

On the west coast of the Southern Alps of New Zealand, the Franz Josef Glacier advanced rapidly during the Little Ice Age and reached its maximum extent in the early 18th century. That was one of the few cases of a glacier thrusting into a rainforest. Evidence suggests, corroborated by tree ring proxy data, that the glacier contributed to a −0.56 °C (−1.01 °F) temperature anomaly over the course of the Little Ice Age in New Zealand. Based on dating of a yellow-green lichen of the Rhizocarpon subgenus, the Mueller Glacier, on the eastern flank of the Southern Alps within Aoraki / Mount Cook National Park, is considered to have been at its maximum extent between 1725 and 1730.

=== Pacific islands ===
Sea-level data for the Pacific islands suggest that sea level in the region fell, possibly in two stages, between 1270 and 1475. That was associated with a 1.5 °C fall in temperature, as determined from oxygen-isotope analysis, and an observed increase in the frequency of El Niño. Tropical Pacific coral records indicate the most frequent and intense El Niño–Southern Oscillation activity was in the mid-17th century. Foraminiferal 18 O records indicate that the Indo-Pacific Warm Pool was warm and saline between 1000 and 1400, with temperatures approximating current conditions, but that it cooled from 1400 onwards and reached its lowest temperatures in 1700. That is consistent with the transition from the mid-Holocene warming to the Little Ice Age. The nearby southwestern Pacific, however, experienced warmer-than-average conditions over the course of the Little Ice Age, which is thought to be from the increased trade winds, which increased the evaporation and the salinity in the region. The dramatic temperature differences between the higher latitudes and the equator are thought to have resulted in drier conditions in the subtropics. Independent multiproxy analyses of Raraku Lake (sedimentology, mineralology, organic and inorganic geochemistry, etc.) indicate that Easter Island was subject to two phases of arid climate that led to drought. The first occurred between 500 and 1200, and the second occurring during the Little Ice Age from 1570 to 1720. In between both arid phases, the island enjoyed a humid period from 1200 to 1570. That coincided with the peak of the Rapa Nui civilization.

==== Indigenous societies in the Pacific ====
The Little Ice Age may have contributed to social and political transformations among several indigenous societies in the Pacific, although the relationship between climatic change and conflict remains debated. Archaeological evidence suggests that environmental stress associated with cooler temperatures, increased climatic variability, and regional droughts may have intensified competition over resources and encouraged the development of defensive settlements.

In New Zealand, cooler climatic conditions reduced the geographic range of Polynesian horticulture, particularly the cultivation of Kūmara (sweet potato), and contributed to shifts in settlement patterns. Archaeologists have linked the later phases of the Little Ice Age with increasing reliance on fortified settlements known as Pā, which became a dominant feature of Māori landscapes and reflected heightened concerns with defence and intertribal warfare.

Across parts of tropical Polynesia and Melanesia, including Fiji, Tonga and Hawaiʻi, the chronology of many fortifications corresponds broadly with the period of the Little Ice Age. A comparative study of Pacific fortifications concluded that their proliferation often coincided with periods of climatic instability and resource stress, although local political and cultural factors also played important roles.

On Rapa Nui (Easter Island), the Little Ice Age coincided with a prolonged dry phase between approximately 1570 and 1720. Researchers have suggested that reduced freshwater availability and declining agricultural productivity may have exacerbated existing environmental pressures and contributed to social reorganization and increased conflict among competing groups. However, the relative importance of climatic deterioration, ecological degradation, and social factors remains disputed.

=== South America ===
Tree-ring data from Patagonia show cold episodes from 1270 and 1380 and from 1520 to 1670, during the events in the Northern Hemisphere. Eight sediment cores taken from Puyehue Lake have been interpreted as showing a humid period from 1470 to 1700, which the authors describe as a regional marker of the onset of the Little Ice Age. A 2009 paper details cooler and wetter conditions in southeastern South America between 1550 and 1800 by citing evidence obtained via several proxies and models. ^{18}O records from three Andean ice cores show a cool period from 1600 to 1800.

Although it is only anecdotal evidence, the Antonio de Vea expedition entered San Rafael Lake in 1675 through Río Témpanos (Spanish for "Ice Floe River"). The Spanish mentioned no ice floe but stated that the San Rafael Glacier did not reach far into the lagoon. In 1766, another expedition noticed that the glacier reached the lagoon and calved into large icebergs. Hans Steffen visited the area in 1898 and noticed that the glacier penetrated far into the lagoon. Such historical records indicate a general cooling in the area between 1675 and 1898: "The recognition of the LIA in northern Patagonia, through the use of documentary sources, provides important, independent evidence for the occurrence of this phenomenon in the region." As of 2001, the borders of the glacier had significantly retreated from those of 1675.

It has been suggested that all glaciers of Gran Campo Nevado next to the Strait of Magellan reached their largest extent of the whole Holocene epoch during the Little Ice Age.

It has been proposed that the Little Ice Age, locally lasting from the 17th to the 19th centuries, may have decreased the productivity of marine ecosystems and the navigability of the Patagonian fjords and channels, being thus detrimental to the sea-faring Kawésqar.

=== Middle East ===
The Ottoman Empire was one of the largest and most powerful empires in the world during this period, with territories in three continents and a range of climates and ecosystems. The Little Ice Age affected its economy, society, and culture from the early 14th century, as it rose from a small group of soldiers to a major world power, until the mid-19th century, with its most intense phase between the 16th and 17th centuries. The effects of the Little Ice Age on the Ottoman Empire were significant, leading to changes in agricultural practices, increased food prices, and social unrest. Each ancient Middle Eastern empire had a primary food-growing region: the Byzantines had Anatolia and Syria; the Abbasids had the lower Tigris-Euphrates region, Khurasan, and Bukhara; and the Ottomans had Egypt. The Ottoman Empire had grown and distributed sufficient grain along the Danube, the Black Sea, and the Nile. The cooling climate disrupted agriculture, shortening the growing season and decreasing crop yields, and led to food shortages and famines. This was exacerbated by extreme weather events, such as droughts, floods, and storms, which further reduced crop yields.

In 1265, 1277 and 1297–1298, Byzantine sources describe extreme cold, then harsh winters in 1298-1299 throughout the Middle East. This was followed by a drought in Asia Minor during 1302-1304, along with flooding on the Sangarious River in summer 1302.

Due to the expansion of the Ottoman Empire in the late 16th century, the population of the empire reached around 30 million people, which led to a shortage of land and an increase in tax. The second half of the 16th century saw rising prices in both the Middle East and Europe. The large population and lack of supplies created a strain on the Ottoman government.

During the 1590s, a wave of extremely cold winters began, and the longest drought in the Middle East in six centuries marked the beginning of the Little Ice Age. Settled peasants were unwilling or unable to leave their traditional lands during the climate shifts, and often rose into revolt against the established authorities, unlike nomads who could easily move. Nevertheless, the Little Ice Age led to significant migrations, as some regions became uninhabitable while others became more attractive, which changed the demographics and political economy of the empire.

The drought and cold led to a series of uprisings collectively known as the Celali Rebellion, c. 1596–1610. (In February 1621, the Bosphorus Strait in Istanbul froze over completely.) The rebellion became the longest-lasting internal challenge to state power in the Ottoman Empire's six centuries of existence. The demand of the rebels was not to overthrow the Ottoman government but to replace certain regional governors. The Ottoman Empire did not fully recover from the Little Ice Age for around a hundred years, and were left with a large population loss.

== Central England temperature series ==
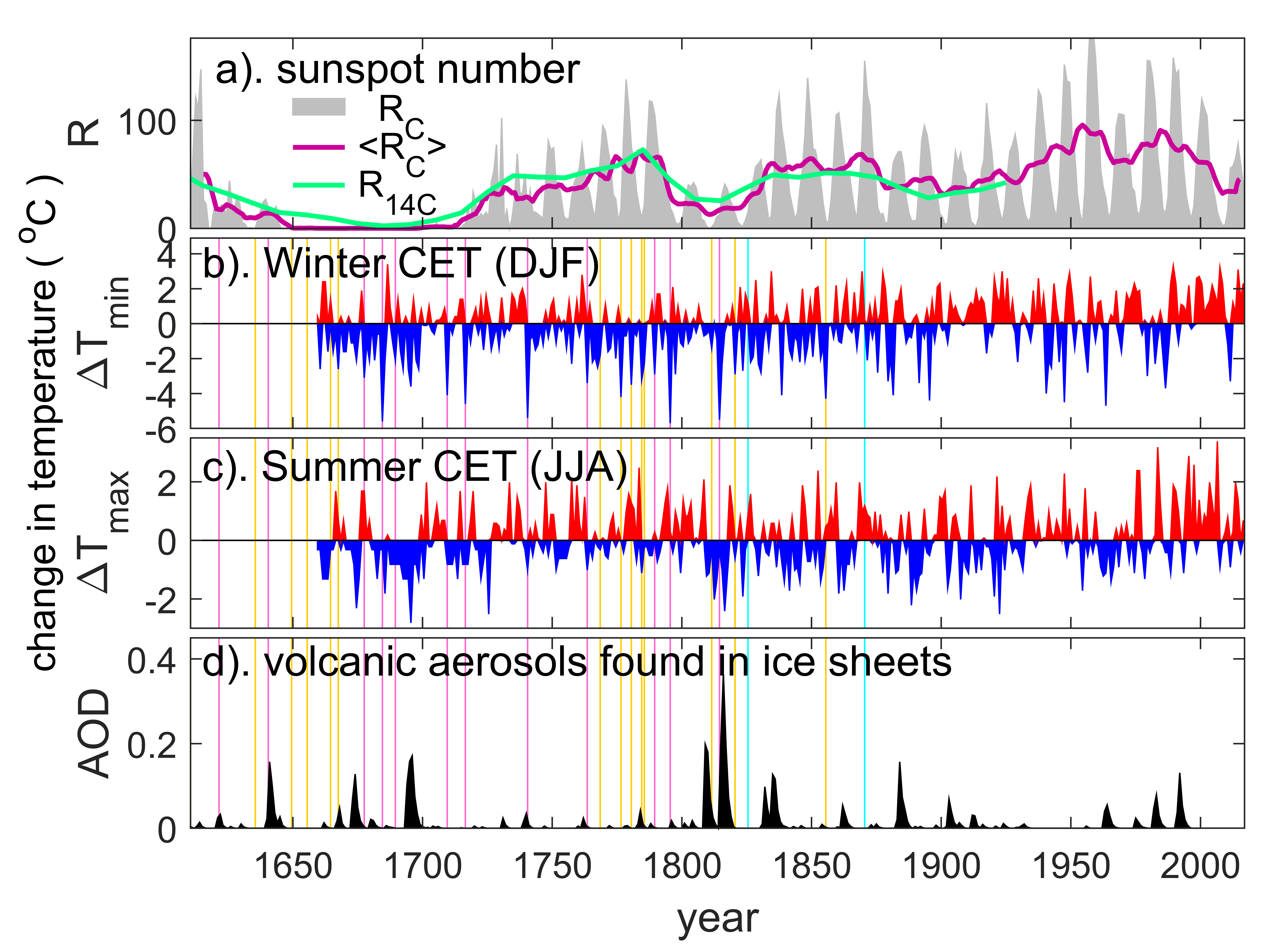
Seasonal values of Central England temperatures. The top panel shows group sunspot numbers: the grey area shows the annual values from telescopic observations, the mauve line its 11-year running means, and the green line the values deduced from the abundance of the Carbon-14 cosmogenic isotope in tree trunks. The second panel shows the winter values of Central England temperature, being the mean for December, January and February. The third panel shows the summer values, being the mean for June, July and August. The bottom panel gives the aerosal optical depth, showing volcanic dust levels, from ice sheet cores. The vertical mauve lines are years in which frost fairs were held on the Thames in London and the vertical orange lines are the years when the ice there was reported as thick enough to walk on. The first cyan line is the date of the removal of the old London Bridge and weir and the second is the completion of the embankments: both riverine developments that increased the flow and ended Thames freezing events. All data sources are given in reference

The Central England temperature (CET) is the longest instrumental temperature record in existence anywhere in the world, and extends back continuously from the present day to 1659. Hence it starts in the middle of the Little Ice Age (LIA), however the LIA interval is defined. CET holds some very important implications for our understanding of the LIA. The CET data show that during the LIA there was an increased occurrence of exceptionally cold winters and these years coincided with years when frost fairs were held on the Thames and when exceptionally low temperatures were reported elsewhere in Europe. It also agrees well with paleoclimate estimates in average trends. However, winters were not unremittingly cold during the LIA in the CET record. For example, the coldest winter (defined by the average temperature for December, January and February) in the whole CET data series is 1684 (the year of one of the most famous frost fairs) yet the fifth warmest winter in the whole CET data series to date occurred just two years later, in 1686. Furthermore, summer temperatures are not greatly depressed during the LIA and when they are these lower temperatures correlate highly with volcanic eruptions. Hence the CET data strongly argue that the LIA, at least in Europe, should be regarded as a period of enhanced occurrence of exceptionally cold winters and hence lower average temperatures and not as an interval of unremitting cold.

== Possible causes ==
Scientists have tentatively identified seven possible causes of the Little Ice Age: orbital cycles, decreased solar activity, increased volcanic activity, altered ocean current flows, fluctuations in the human population in different parts of the world causing reforestation or deforestation, and the inherent variability of global climate.

=== Orbital cycles ===
Orbital forcing from cycles in the Earth's orbit around the Sun has for the past 2,000 years caused a long-term northern hemisphere cooling trend, which continued through the Middle Ages and the Little Ice Age. The rate of Arctic cooling is roughly 0.02 °C per century. The 20th-century instrumental temperature record shows a reversal of that trend, with a rise in global temperatures attributed to greenhouse gas emissions.

=== Solar activity ===
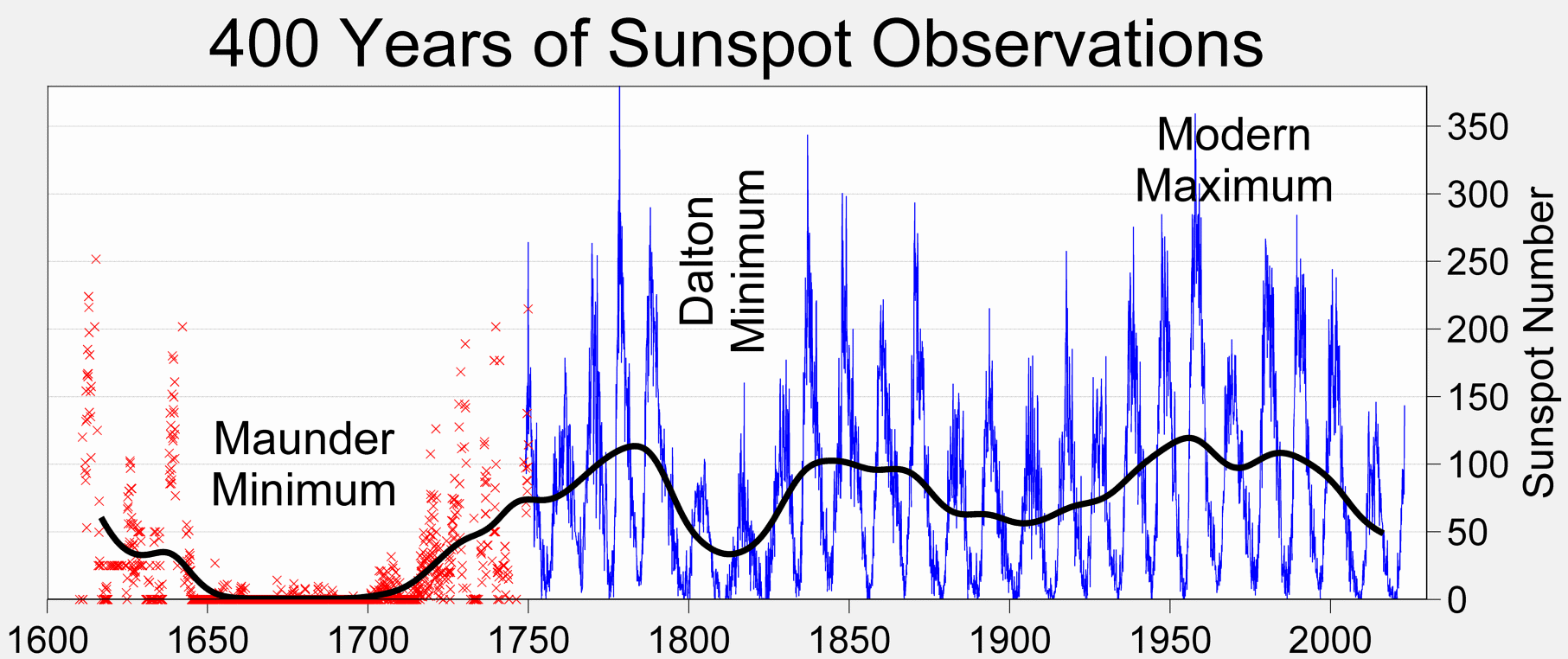
The Maunder Minimum in a 400-year history of sunspot numbers

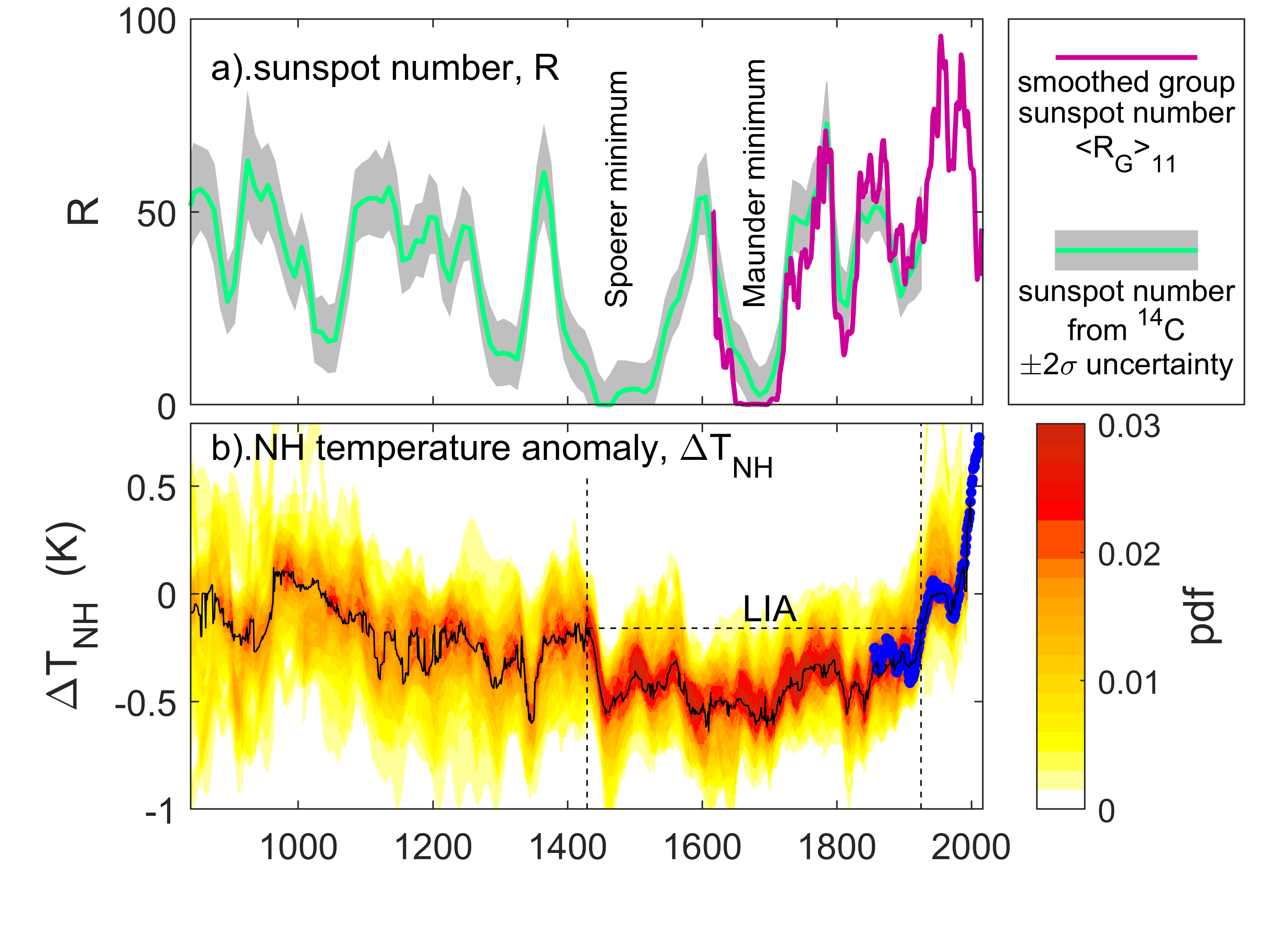
Sunspot number compared with Northern Hemisphere (NH) temperature anomaly. The upper panel shows 11-year smoothed group sunspot numbers from telescopic observations and the sunspot number derived from carbon-14 cosmogenic isotope abundances in tree trunks. The lower panel shows the Northern Hemisphere (NH) temperature anomaly (relative to the 1990 level) from a wide variety of paleoclimate proxies: the black line is the mean value, and the colors give the uncertainty probability distribution. The blue dots are the instrumental record. The dashed lines mark the start and end of the Little Ice Age (LIA) defined by the (NH) temperature anomaly level −0.16 degrees Celsius.

Solar activity includes any disturbances on the Sun such as sunspots and solar flares associated with the variable magnetic field of the solar surface and solar atmosphere (corona). Because Alfvén's theorem applies, the coronal magnetic field is dragged out into the heliosphere by the solar wind. Irregularities in this heliospheric magnetic field shield Earth from galactic cosmic rays by scattering them, which allows scientists to track solar activity in the past by analyzing both the carbon-14 or beryllium-10 isotopes generated by cosmic rays hitting the atmosphere and which are deposited in terrestrial reservoirs such as tree rings and ice sheets. In the intervals 1400–1550 (the Spörer Minimum) and 1645–1715 (the Maunder Minimum) there were very low recorded levels of solar activity and they are both within, or at least overlapped with, the LIA for most definitions. However, solar activity deduced from cosmogenic isotopes was as high between the Spörer Minimum and the Maunder Minimum as it was in about 1940, yet this interval is also within the LIA. Hence any relationship between solar activity and the LIA is far from a simple one.

A drop in solar activity circa 1230 AD as measured by biogenic silica corrected ignition residue (IR-_{BSi}) has been suggested by one study as a forcing potentially responsible for initiating the LIA, with the authors noting that this drop in solar output preceded the onset of significant volcanism.

A study by Dmitri Mauquoy et al. confirmed that at the beginning of the Spörer Minimum, the carbon-14 production rate rose rapidly. These authors argued this rise coincided with a sharp drop in temperatures deduced from European peat bogs. This temperature drop is also seen in mean northern hemisphere temperatures deduced from a wide variety of paleoclimate indicators but the timing of the onset of the Spörer Minimum is actually some 50 years earlier. A 50-year response lag is possible but is not consistent with subsequent variations in inferred solar activity and average northern hemisphere temperature. For example, the peak in solar activity between the Spörer Minimum and the Maunder Minimum is 50 years after the only peak in average northern hemisphere temperature that it could be associated with.

A study by Judith Lean in 1999 also pointed to a relationship between the Sun and the Little Ice Age. Her research found that there was a 0.13% total solar irradiance (TSI) increase (1.8 Wm^{−1}) over 1650–1790 which could have raised the temperature of the Earth by 0.3 °C. In the calculated correlation coefficients of the global temperature response to their reconstruction of the solar forcing over three different periods, they found an average coefficient of 0.79 (i.e. 62% of the variation could be explained by the TSI) which indicates a possible relationship between the two components. Lean's team also formulated an equation in which the temperature change is 0.16 °C increase in temperature for every 0.1% increase in total solar irradiance. However, the main problem with quantifying the longer-term trends in TSI lies in the stability of the absolute radiometry measurements made from space, which has improved since the pioneering work of Judith Lean discussed above, but still remains a problem. Analysis comparing trends in modern observations of TSI and cosmic ray fluxes shows that the uncertainties mean that it is possible that TSI was actually higher in the Maunder Minimum than present-day levels, but uncertainties are high with best estimates of the difference between the modern-day TSI and the Maunder-Minimum TSI in the range ±0.5 Wm^{−1} but with a 2 σ uncertainty range of ±1 Wm^{−1}.

At the center of the LIA, during the Spörer Minimum and the Maunder Minimum, sunspots were minimal and cosmogenic isotope deposition (carbon-14 and beryllium-10) was increased in these minima as a result. However, detailed studies from multiple paleoclimate indicators show that the lower Northern Hemisphere temperatures in the Little Ice Age began before the start of the Maunder Minimum but after the start of the Spörer Minimum and persisted until after the Maunder Minimum (and even after the much weaker Dalton Minimum) had ceased. The return to more active solar conditions between these two grand solar minima had no obvious effect on either global or Northern Hemisphere temperatures. The Central England Temperature provide evidence that low solar activity may have contributed to the LIA through the increased occurrence of cold winters, at least in Europe, but colder summers are more correlated with volcanic activity. Comparison of TSI records with Greenland ice core δ^{18}O trends suggests that solar activity only accounted for 55% of the observed trend variance. Numerical climate modelling indicates that volcanic activity was the greater driver of the overall lower temperatures in the LIA, as seen in a variety of paleoclimate proxies.

=== Volcanic activity ===
In a 2012 paper, Miller et al. link the Little Ice Age to an "unusual 50-year-long episode with four large sulfur-rich explosive eruptions, each with global sulfate loading >60 Tg" and notes that "large changes in solar irradiance are not required."

Throughout the LIA, there was heightened volcanic activity. When a volcano erupts, its ash reaches high into the atmosphere and can spread to cover the whole earth. The ash cloud blocks out some of the incoming solar radiation, which leads to worldwide cooling for up to two years after an eruption. Also emitted by eruptions is sulfur in the form of sulfur dioxide. When sulfur dioxide reaches the stratosphere, the gas turns into sulfuric and sulfurous acid particles, which reflect the Sun's rays. That further reduces the amount of radiation reaching the Earth's surface.

A recent study found that an especially severe tropical volcanic eruption in 1257, possibly Mount Samalas (pre-caldera edifice of the active Rinjani) near Mount Rinjani, both in Lombok, Indonesia, followed by three smaller eruptions in 1268, 1275, and 1284, did not allow the climate to recover. That may have caused the initial cooling, and the 1452/1453 mystery eruption triggered a second pulse of cooling. The cold summers can be maintained by sea-ice/ocean feedbacks long after volcanic aerosols are removed.

Other volcanoes that erupted during the era and may have contributed to the cooling include Billy Mitchell (c. 1580), Huaynaputina (1600), Mount Parker (1641), Long Island (Papua New Guinea) (ca. 1660), and Laki (1783). The 1815 eruption of Tambora, also in Indonesia, blanketed the atmosphere with ash, and the following year came to be known as the Year Without a Summer, when frost and snow were reported in June and July in both New England and Northern Europe.

=== Ocean circulation ===
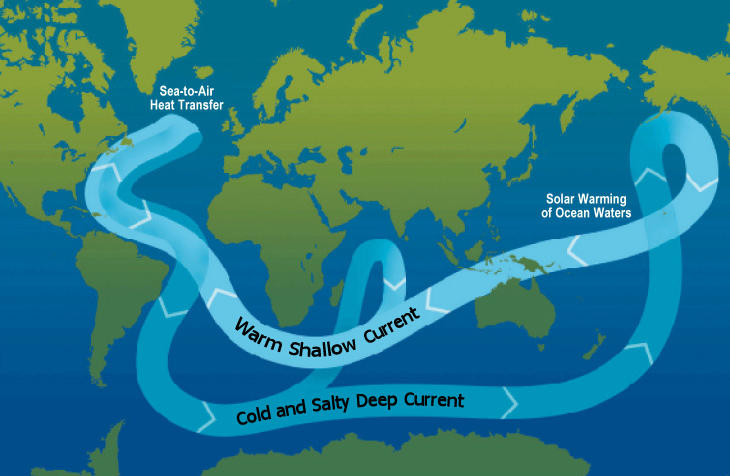
Thermohaline circulation or Oceanic conveyor belt illustrated

In the early 2000s, a slowing of thermohaline circulation was proposed as an explanation for the LIA, specifically, through the weakening of the North Atlantic Gyre. The circulation could have been interrupted by the introduction of a large amount of fresh water into the North Atlantic and might have been caused by a period of warming before the LIA that is known as the Medieval Warm Period. Some researchers have thus classified the LIA as a Bond event. In 2005 there was some concern that a shutdown of thermohaline circulation could happen again as a result of the present warming.

More recent research indicates that the overall Atlantic Meridional Overturning Circulation may already be weaker now than it was during the LIA, or perhaps even over the past millennium. While there is still a robust debate about the present-day AMOC strength, these findings make the link between AMOC and the LIA unlikely. However, some research instead suggests that a far more localized disruption of the North Subpolar Gyre convection was involved in the LIA. This is potentially relevant for the near future, as a minority of climate models project a permanent collapse of this convection under some scenarios of future climate change.

=== Human population decrease ===
The Black Death is estimated to have killed 30% to 60% of the European population. In total, the plague may have reduced the world population from an estimated 475 million to 350–375 million in the 14th century. It took 200 years for the world population to recover to its previous level. William Ruddiman et al. proposed that those large population reductions in Europe, East Asia, and the Middle East caused a decrease in agricultural activity that allowed reforestation to cause additional carbon dioxide uptake from the atmosphere, leading to LIA cooling.

A 2011 study by the Carnegie Institution's Department of Global Ecology asserts that the Mongol conquests, which lasted almost two centuries, contributed to global cooling by depopulating vast regions and replacing cultivated land by carbon-absorbing forest.

William Ruddiman further hypothesized that a reduced population in the Americas after European contact started in the 16th century could have had a similar effect. Similarly, Koch and others in 1990 suggested that as European conquest and disease brought by Europeans killed as many as 90% of Indigenous Americans, around 50 million hectares of land may have returned to a wilderness state, causing increased carbon dioxide uptake. Other researchers have supported depopulation in the Americas as a factor and have asserted that humans cleared considerable amounts of forest to support agriculture there before the arrival of Europeans brought on a population collapse.

Richard Nevle, Robert Dull and colleagues further suggested not only that anthropogenic forest clearance played a role in reducing the amount of carbon sequestered in Neotropical forests but also that human-set fires played a central role in reducing biomass in Amazonian and Central American forests before the arrival of the Europeans and the concomitant spread of diseases during the Columbian exchange. Dull and Nevle calculated that reforestation in the tropical biomes of the Americas alone from 1500 to 1650 accounted for net carbon sequestration of 2–5 Pg. Brierley conjectured that the European arrival in the Americas caused mass deaths from epidemic disease, which caused much abandonment of farmland. That caused much forest to return, which sequestered more CO_{2}. A study of sediment cores and soil samples further suggests that CO_{2} uptake via reforestation in the Americas could have contributed to the LIA. The depopulation is linked to a drop in CO_{2} levels observed at Law Dome, Antarctica.

However, the hypothesis is criticized on the grounds that the kind of agroforestry practiced by the pre-Columbian farmers in South America did not actually result in a large-scale deforestation typical for modern agriculture so the reforestation should not have had such a huge effect.

=== Inherent variability of climate ===
Spontaneous fluctuations in global climate might explain the past variability. It is very difficult to know what the true level of variability from internal causes might be given the existence of other forces, as noted above, whose magnitude may not be known. One approach to evaluating internal variability is the use of long integrations of coupled ocean-atmosphere global climate models. They have the advantage that the external forcing is known to be zero, but the disadvantage is that they may not fully reflect reality. The variations may result from chaos-driven changes in the oceans, the atmosphere, or interactions between the two. Two studies have concluded that the demonstrated inherent variability was not great enough to account for the Little Ice Age. The severe winters of 1770 to 1772 in Europe, however, have been attributed to an anomaly in the North Atlantic oscillation.

== See also ==
- Medieval warm period – North Atlantic regional climate era, c. 950 - c. 1250
- 8.2-kiloyear event – Rapid global cooling about 8,200 years ago
- Bond event – North Atlantic ice rafting events
- Great Frost of 1709 – Coldest recorded winter in Europe
- Historical climatology – Academic field of study
- Late Antique Little Ice Age – Northern Hemispheric cooling period
- Paleoclimatology – Study of changes in ancient climate
- Retreat of glaciers since 1850 – Recent shrinking of glaciers due to global warming
- Year Without a Summer – 1816 volcanic winter climate event
- Younger Dryas – Time period c. 12,900–11,700 years ago
