= Little Ice Age volcanism =

Massive volcanic activity during the Little Ice Age

Fig. 1 – global average temperatures show that the Little Ice Age was not a distinct planet-wide time period, but the end of a long temperature decline that preceded recent global warming.

Little Ice Age volcanism refers to the massive volcanic activities during the Little Ice Age. Scientists suggested a hypothesis that volcanism was the major driving force of the global cooling among the other natural factors, i.e. the sunspot activities by orbital forcing and greenhouse gas. The Past Global Change (PAGES), a registered paleo-science association for scientific research and networking on past global changes in the University of Bern, Switzerland, suggested that from 1630 to 1850, a total of 16 major eruptions and cooling events had taken place. When a volcano erupts, ashes burst out of the vent together with magma and forms a cloud in the atmosphere. The ashes act as an isolating layer that block out a proportion of solar radiation, causing global cooling. The global cooling effect impacts ocean currents, atmospheric circulation and cause social impacts such as drought and famine. Wars and rebellions were therefore triggered worldwide in the Little Ice Age. It was suggested that the crisis on Ottoman Empire and Ming-Qing Transition in China were typical examples that closely correlated with Little Ice Age.

== Volcanism during the Little Ice Age ==
Fig. 2 – shows the structure of a stratovolcano. Magma escapes from the magma chamber and forms different layers in different eruptions. The eruption also emits ashes and various gases.

=== Three major cooling periods ===
Three large cooling periods were caused by volcanic eruptions in 1641–1642, 1667–1694 and 1809–1831 respectively. Also, some major volcanic eruptions caused the fall of the temperature. During the Little Ice Age, all major volcanic eruptions were stratovolcano, also known as composite volcanos. They were built by the escape of magma through separate vents over thousands of years, accumulated into layers. A large amount of sulfate and volcanic ashes escaped from the volcano, resulting in a significant decrease in temperature.

==== 1641–1642 ====
- Komaga-take volcano, Japan (1640) (probably the largest eruption in Japan's history, deposited a large amount of ashes)
- Mount Villarica, Chile (1640)
- Parker Volcano, Philippines (1641)

==== 1667–1694 ====
- Shikotsu (Tarumae), Japan (1667)
- Gamkonora, Halmahera (1673)
- Tongkoko, Sulawesi (1680)

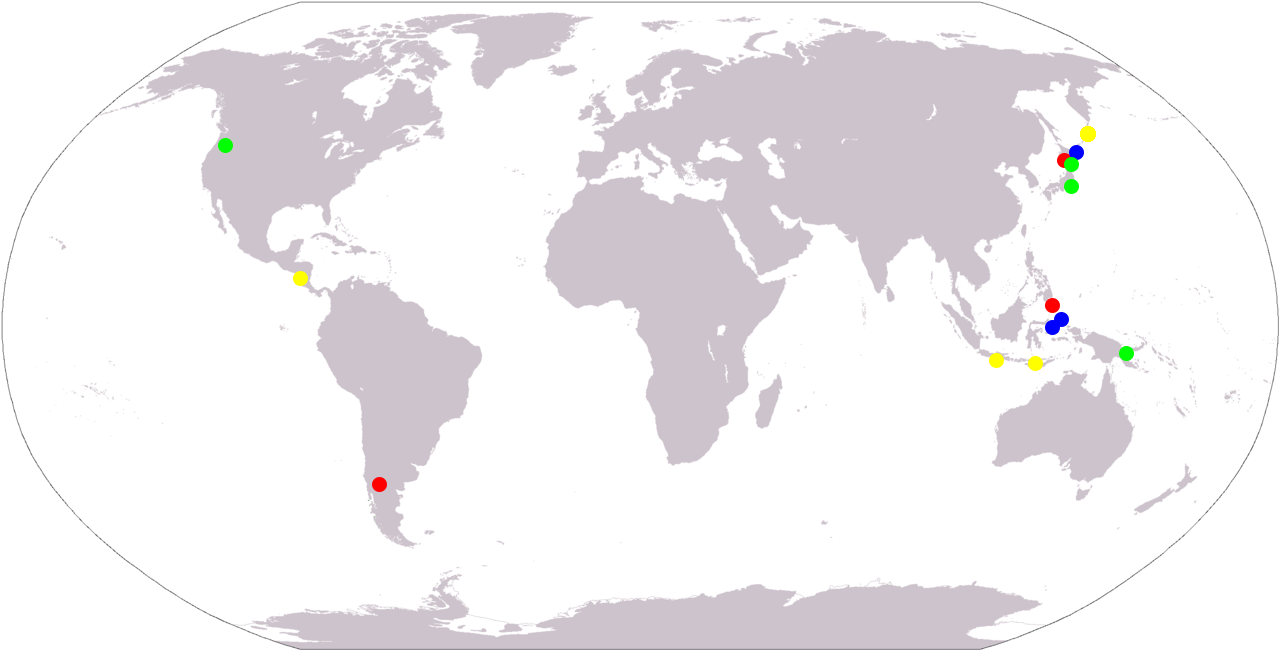
Fig. 3 – location of the major volcanic events: 1641 to 1642 (red), 1667 to 1694 (blue), 1809 to 1831 (yellow), and other major volcanic eruptions (green)

==== 1809–1831 ====
- An unknown volcanic activity (1809)
- Tambora, Indonesia (1815) (The largest eruption known in history)
- Galunggung, Indonesia (1822)
- Zavaritski, Simushir, Kuril Islands (1831)
- Cosigüina, Nicaragua (1835)

=== Other major volcanic eruptions ===
- Long Island, New Guinea (1660)
- Usu, Japan (1663)
- Mount Fuji, Japan (1707)
- Shikotsu (Tarumae), Japan (1739)
- St Helens, Washington, US (1800)

*All Volcanic Eruptions have a Volcanic Explosivity Index (VEI) of 5 or above. It means that the volume of gases and aerosols ejected were more than 1 km^{3} and the eruption column height was more than 25 km.

Major explosive volcanic eruptions during the Little Ice Age
Volcano	Year	Region	Season	VEI	Effects/Features	Types of Volcanos
Komaga-Take Volcano	31 July 1640	Japan	3	6	The Volcanic Eruption caused the Tsunami which reached Atokuchi-Yama. The thickness of the Ash deposition was up to 1–2 m.	Stratovolcano
Mount Villarica	February 1640	Chile	unknown	unknown	"Began to erupt with such force that it expelled burning rocks... So much burning ash fell into the river Alipen that the waters burned in such a way that it cooked all the fish here." (Parker, 2013)	Stratovolcano
Parker volcano	1641	Philippines	1	5	The eruption caused devastating pyroclastic flows and ash deposition and darkness over Mindanao Island.	Stratovolcano
Long Island	1660	New Guinea	unknown	6	The eruption was the largest eruption in Papua New Guinea's history, with an estimated air-fall volume in excess of 11 km^{3}	Stratovolcano
Usu	1663	Japan	3	6	2.5 km^{3} rhyolitic pumice fall deposited in the east reaching about 1 m thick in Shiraoi coast.	Stratovolcano
Shikotsu (Tarumae)	1667	Japan	4	5	A small 1.5 km wide caldera formed during the eruption (Hokkaido's largest historical eruption)	Stratovolcano
Gamkonora	1673	Halmahera	2	5?	A tsunami was produced which inundated villages.	Stratovolcano
Tongkoko	1680	Sulawesi	unknown	5	The escape of aerosols was high into the stratosphere and the proxies were found in Greenland Ice cores.	Stratovolcano
Fuji	16 December 1707	Japan	1	5	800 million m^{3} of ashes were escaped and the ash reached and blanketed 100 km away. It caused a number of deaths.	Stratovolcano
Shikotsu (Tarumae)	1739	Japan	3	5	The density of the yearly tree ring changed in 1740. Scientists believed that the eruption affected the climate.	Stratovolcano
St Helens	1800	United States	1	5	It began the Goat Rocks eruptive period and the continuous eruptions were relieved until the 1850s.	Stratovolcano
Tambora	10 April 1815	Indonesia	2	7	This was the world's greatest eruption since the end of the ice age. The ash and smoke blanketed the Northern Hemisphere and caused "The year without summer"	Stratovolcano
Galunggung Volcano	1822	Indonesia	unknown	5	The mudflows killed over 4000 people and destroyed more than 114 villages.	Stratovolcano
Cosigüina Volcano	1835	Nicaragua	1	5	It was the largest volcanic eruption in Central America since Spanish Colonization. the total volume of deposits was about 6 km^{3}	Stratovolcano

== Cooling effect of volcanic eruptions ==
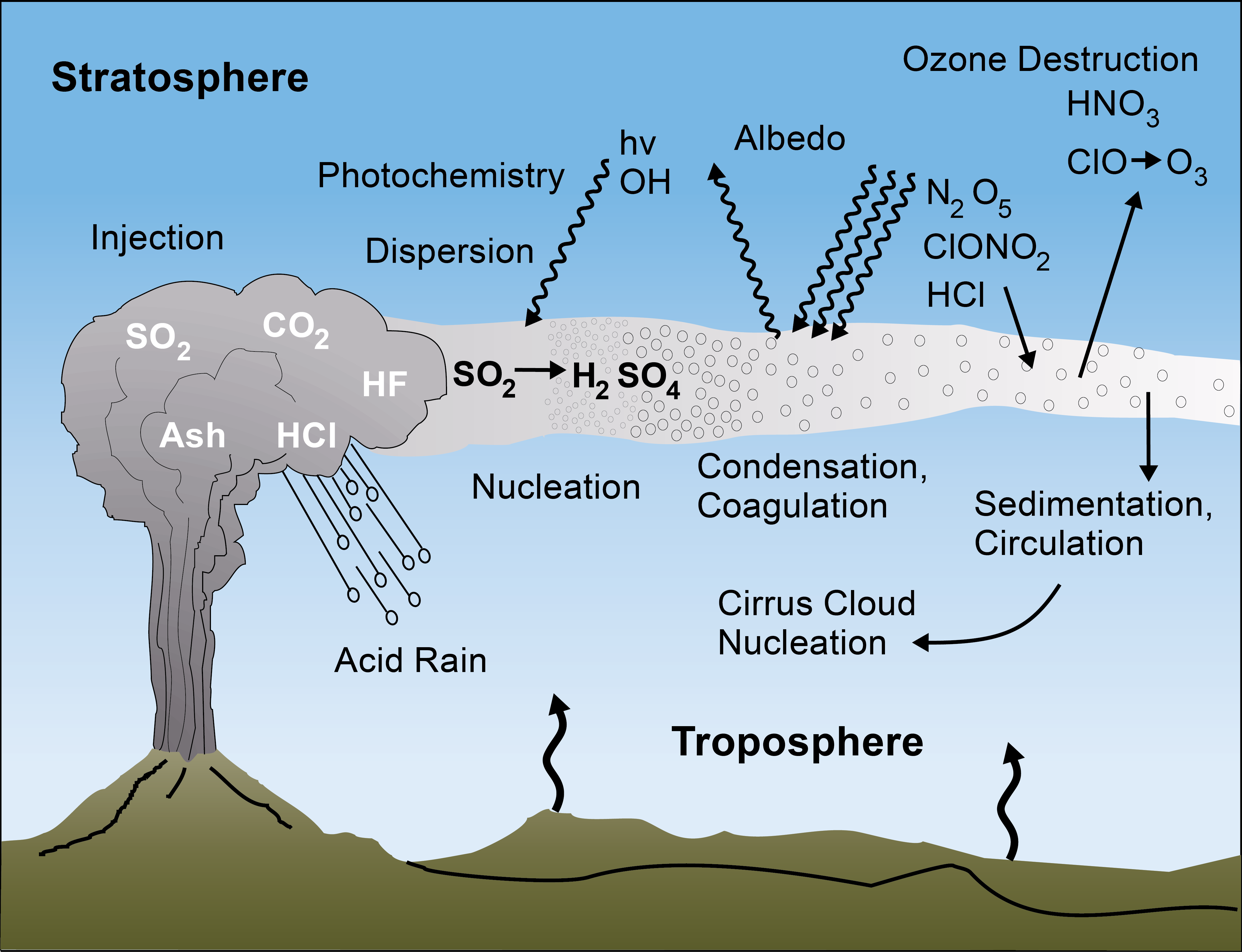
Fig. 4 – shows how sunlight initiates photochemical reactions in which sulfur dioxide reacts with ozone to form sulfuric acid

Volcanoes are usually formed along plate boundaries or hotspots. Each eruption allows lava, volcanic ash and gases (toxic gases and greenhouse gases) to escape from the magma chamber under the surface. The escaped materials trigger the global cooling effect.

=== Global cooling ===
The temperature on the surface is affected by the greenhouse effect. During the Little Ice Age, volcanic eruptions produced ashes that blocked solar insolation. The Earth surface received less radiation, the temperature decreased significantly. The effect lasted for around 6–8 years (Fig. 5). In addition, sulfur dioxide produced from eruptions reacted with the ozone layer to form sulfuric acid. Fine sulfate aerosols were formed in the atmosphere, which increased the reflection of solar and caused global cooling.

The list of volcanism products
Product	Formula	Causing global cooling
Volcanic ashes	Nil	
Sulfur dioxide	SO_{2}	✓
Carbon dioxide	CO_{2}	
Hydrogen sulphide	H_{2}S	✓
Lava	Nil	

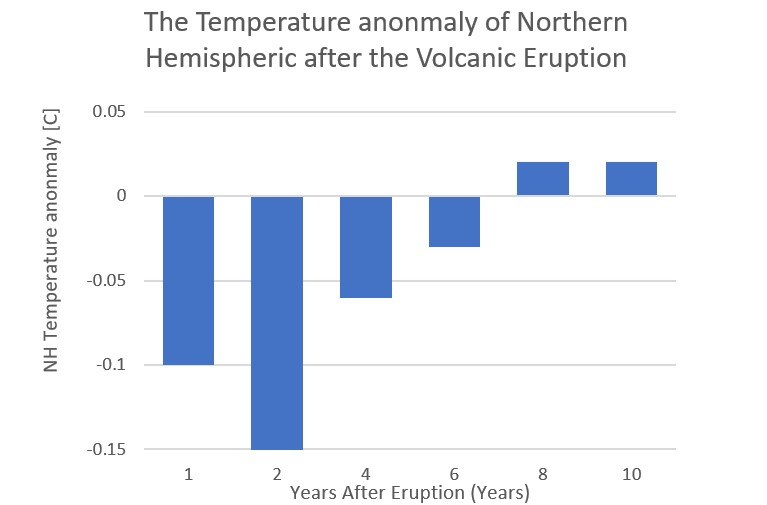
Fig. 5 – graph shows the temperature anomaly after the volcanic eruptions. (Gabriele et al., 2003)

=== Correlation between volcanism and Little Ice Age ===
Scientists pointed out several natural causes of the Little Ice Age, e.g. volcanic activity, orbital cycles, decreased solar activity and Greenhouse gas. Gabriele C. Hegerl compared the different forcing of Little Ice Age based on various studies. An energy balance model was simulated, with volcanic, solar and greenhouse gas signals as parameters. They created various models to calculate the correlation between natural forcing and temperature change. It showed natural forcing acted as an important role in temperature change (Fig. 5). Also, the research also compared the contribution of temperature change among three natural factors. Volcanic activities was the main driver of the Little Ice Age (Fig. 7), because volcanism was the largest forcing.

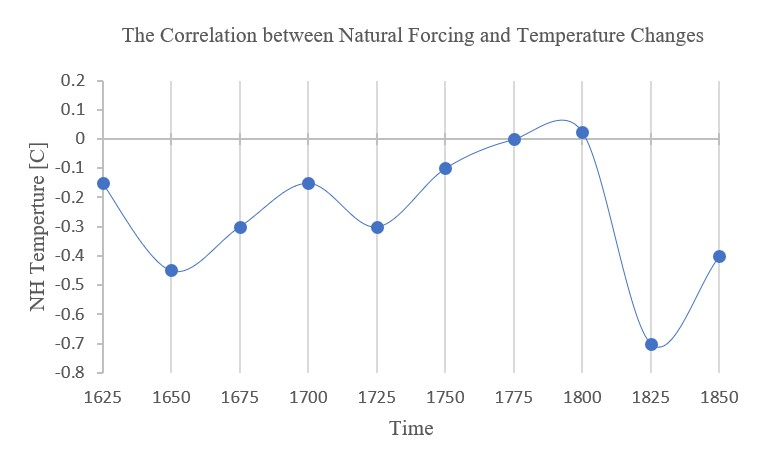
Fig. 6 – graph shows the temperature change induced by natural factors which were volcanism, solar and greenhouse gases. (Gabriele et al., 2003)

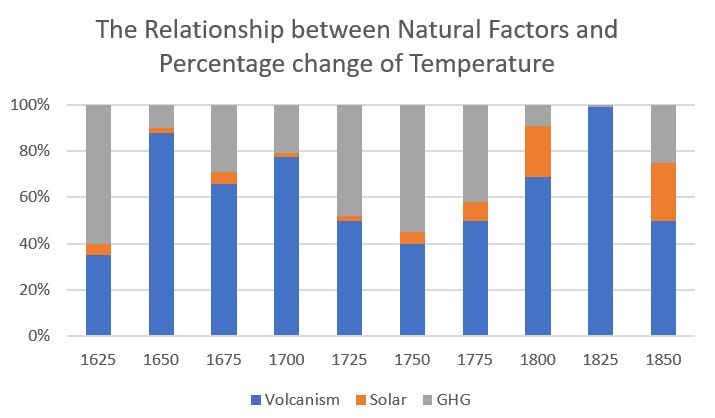
Fig. 7 – graph shows the contribution of 3 natural factors (Volcanism, Solar and Greenhouses) to the percentage of temperature change. (Gabriele et al., 2003)

== Geophysical impact ==
Little Ice Age Volcanism caused a temperature anomaly. It affected the climate system, i.e. the atmosphere, the hydrosphere. The influence of the climate system would cause the impact of the ecosystem and the society.

=== Ocean circulation ===
During the Little Ice Age, the Northern Hemisphere had a remarkable climatic shift. There was a nonlinear regime shift in the North Atlantic Ocean Circulation and changed ocean circulation. There are two reasons for the change. Firstly, the cold climate reduced the melting rate of the Arctic Sea ice in the summer, less freshwater remained in the Ocean, leading to a change of the stratification in the Ocean. Besides, in Nordic Sea, the abrupt cooling showed a delay and gradual warming trend in contrast to a basin-wide cooling during the Little Ice Age as the oceans take up heat and recharge their heat content. The scientists believed that it was a volcanically triggered regime shift.

=== Atmospheric circulation ===
Fig. 8 – diagram shows Normal Atmospheric Circulation in the Pacific Ocean. The low-pressure system forms in East Pacific. Fig. 9 – diagram of the El Niño condition. The warm air shifts to the central Pacific.

The massive volcanic eruption caused an abrupt cooling, the palaeoanalysis shows a significant decrease of mean global temperature. It affects the global monsoon system, the system is the major wind system that dominates the climate pattern of the Earth by seasonally reverses its direction. Hence the climate patterns of different regions, i.e. precipitation and temperature were changed after the cooling.

==== African Monsoon Region ====
African Monsoon Region is located between latitudes N10° and N20°, it is the major wind system which affected the West African Region. The temperature change weakened the African Monsoon system and Atlantic-European Hadley cell. In the African Monsoon Region, the Intertropical Convergence Zone (ITCZ) shifted southwards. The ITCZ shifted to the position far from Doldrums (the low pressure air uplifting region in equator). The air in the Atlantic converges with the drier air and causes a lower precipitation.

==== Asian-Australian Monsoon ====
Asian-Australian Monsoon is the major wind system affected the East Asia and Australia by the shift of prevailing wind between summer and winter seasons. However, the cooling weakened the Asian-Australian Monsoon. It affected the migration of the Intertropical Convergence Zone (ITCZ), the moist air could not reach southern Asia and tropical China. Gallego's paper pointed out that there was a low DJF Australian monsoon index during Little Ice Age.

==== South Asia Monsoon ====
South Asia Monsoon affects the Indian subcontinent annually The southward shift of the northern tropical belt (the boundary of Hadley cell and Ferrel Cell) and the weaken Atlantic Multidecadal Oscillation affected the South Asia Monsoon (a monsoon system mostly affects the climate of Indian subcontinent). Less precipitation occurred during the Little Ice Age.

=== El Niño ===
El Niño, also named as El Niño-Southern Oscillation (ENSO), appeared in Pacific Ocean. It affects the walker circulation (an Atmosphere Circulation between East Pacific and Western Pacific). In normal conditions, the warm air developed in the Eastern Pacific, formed a low pressure system which blows the wind to the East Pacific Region. The uplifting air in the East Pacific Region enhances the precipitation.(Figure 8) However, when El Niño happens, the warm air shifts to the central Pacific causing the changes of precipitation and temperature. During the Little Ice Age, the increased volcanic activity triggered El Niño. In the mid-seventeenth century, it happened about once every five years, while the average frequency is every 20 years. It caused droughts in different regions such as southern Africa, India and southern China.

== Methodology ==
Earth scientists used a variety of proxies and instruments of climate indicator to measure the temperature changes and the proportion of natural forcing.

=== Tree-ring dating ===
Tree ring dating, also known as dendrochronology, is an excellent indicator to measure the climate pattern. Each ring records a cycle of seasons. Scientists can determine the age of the trees and the temperature of that particular period through the dating. The width of tree rings are thicker in warmer seasons and thinner in cooler environments. During Little Ice Age, the radial stem growth was thinner than in Medieval Warm Period (MWP), a warm climate period before Little Ice Age from c. 950 to c. 1250, which reflected a relatively low temperature between 1400 and 1800. On the other hand, longer width of tree wings are found during Little Ice Age.

=== Carbon dating ===
==== Carbon-14 dating ====
Carbon dating, also known as radiocarbon dating, is a method to determine the age and the temperature of organic material by measuring the carbon-14 activity. The organic material showed different carbon-14 activities in different climates. For the research of Little Ice Age, scientists collected samples of entombed plants such as moss in the Arctic region to measure the carbon-14 activity. They compared the obtained samples with that of the same existing species to get the result.

==== Measuring CO_{2} concentration ====
Carbon dioxide (CO_{2}) plays an important role in global greenhouse effect. It is an indicator to derive the global carbon cycle (the carbon exchange among the biosphere, geosphere, hydrosphere and atmosphere of the Earth). Before the industrial revolution, the concentration of CO_{2} was mainly regulated by the land use and the ecosystem of the world. In cold climate, the low temperature affect the rate of photosynthesis and reduces a vast area of vegetation. Scientist collected the ice core sample to measure the concentration of the CO_{2} and extrapolate the temperature to figure out the concentration of carbon dioxide is low during Little Ice Age.

=== Ice cap measurement ===
Sea ice is formed by seawater near the Arctic region. The volume of sea ice is determined by the temperature. In the Arctic region, sea ice has a regular annual melt and freeze cycle. The growing and melting of sea ice is an important parameter for scientists to study the climate. Through ice drilling in the Arctic region, scientists could understand the freezing situation of the sea ice. Gifford H. Miller and his research team have discovered that the sea ice froze rapidly at the beginning of the Little Ice Age (around 1400) and has not been melted.

=== Early instrumental observations ===
Modern temperature measurement has been adopted since 1770s. Mercury was widely used as a thermometric liquid to measure temperature. There were also different devices to measure pressure, wind direction and precipitation. In the 1770s, there were more than 20 stations that collected the daily climatic data, which provided a more accurate record for the study.

== See also ==
- Volcanism
- Tree-Ring Dating
- Ice Cap
- Carbon Dating
- Ocean Circulation
- Monsoon
