= Hans Neuberger =

Hans Hermann Neuberger (1910–1996) was head of Pennsylvania State University's Department of Meteorology.

== Early life ==
On 17 February 1910, Hans Hermann Neuberger was born in Mannheim, Germany.

== Education ==
In 1936, Neuberger received a doctorate from the University of Hamburg in Hamburg, Germany. In 1937, Neuberger emigrated to the United States.

== Career ==
Neuberger started his career as an instructor of geophysics at Pennsylvania State College. Neuberger's skills in the creation and use of instrumentation were notable; he designed a polarimeter. In 1970, Neuberger retired but continued to teach at the University of South Florida.

In 1972, Penn State established the Hans Neuberger teaching award to honor Neuberger. It is given to its top teaching assistants for teaching meteorology at the elementary level.

== Personal life ==
On January 13, 1996, Neuberger died in Sun City Center, Florida. Neuberger was 85.
