= Adoration of the Kings (Bruegel) =

Painting by Pieter Bruegel the Elder

The Adoration of the Kings
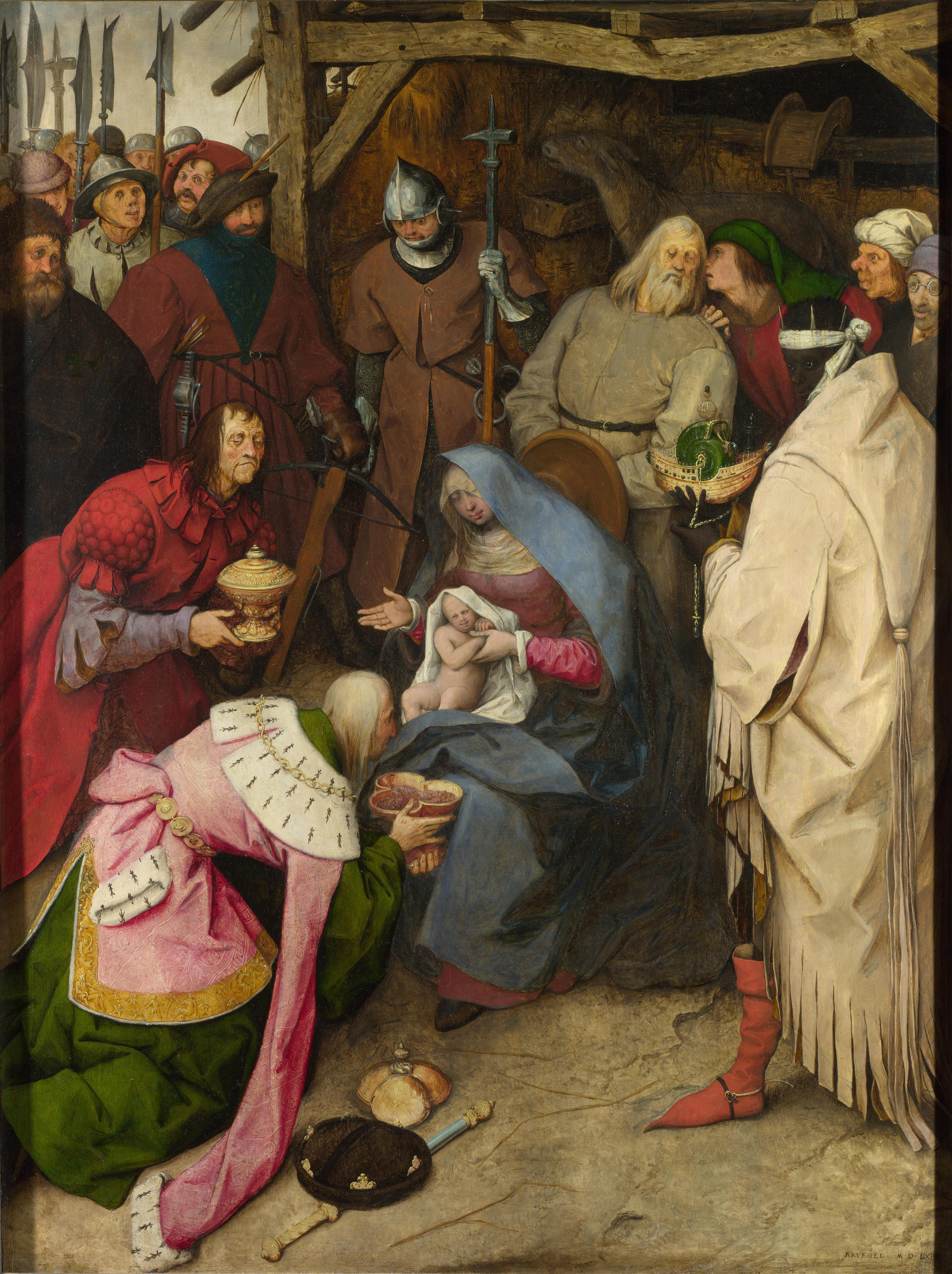
- Artist: Pieter Bruegel the Elder
- Year: 1564, signed and dated at bottom right "BRVEGEL M.D.LXIIII"
- Type: Oil on oak panel
- Dimensions: 112.1 cm × 83.9 cm (44.1 in × 33.0 in)
- Location: National Gallery; London

The Adoration of the Kings is an oil-on-panel painting of the Adoration of the Magi by the Netherlandish Renaissance artist Pieter Bruegel the Elder, painted in 1564. It is held in the National Gallery, in London.

It is one of very few paintings by Pieter Bruegel the Elder in the portrait format, rather than his usual landscape format. Two other paintings of the Adoration by Brueghel survive: an earlier The Adoration of the Kings in tempera on canvas, dated to c. 1556 (Royal Museums of Fine Arts of Belgium, Brussels); and another oil on panel painting, Adoration of the Magi in the Snow, dated to 1563 (Oskar Reinhart Collection 'Am Römerholz', Winterthur, Switzerland).

== Description ==
In the chronological sequence of Bruegel's work, this painting of 1564 marks an important departure as the first to be composed almost exclusively of large figures. The grouping of people, an idea taken from Italian mannerist painters like Parmigianino, permits Bruegel to concentrate on differences between individual faces, giving each face a quite distinct, and sometimes grotesque, expression, quite different to the usual Catholic religious images.

This emphasis on the uniqueness of each figure, and Bruegel's lack of interest in depicting ideal beauty in the Italian manner, makes it clear that although borrowing an Italian compositional scheme, Bruegel is putting it to quite a different use. In this treatment, the painter's first purpose is to record the range and intensity of individual reactions to the sacred event.

The work depicts the Adoration of the Magi, with the three Magi presenting their gifts to the Christ Child: the elderly Caspar kneeling, the middle aged Melchior bowing to the left, and the white-robed Balthazar standing to the right, all dressed richly but somewhat disheveled from their long journey. The gold detailing on Caspar's robe depicts a star, a centaur in the form of Sagittarius, a man holding a snake, and a slug. These symbols are all related to medieval imagery. The three Magi represent the three ages of man – old, middle aged and young – and the three continents known at that time – Europe, Asia and Africa. Caspar, the white-haired old man representing Europe, is wearing a green robe with pink jacket trimmed with gold and ermine, and presenting a trefoil gold vessel with its three-lobed lid removed to display gold coins within. Middle-aged Melchior, representing Asia, has a red jacket over his blue robe: his elaborately chased gold vessel containing frankincense is still lidded. Balthazar, traditionally a black man representing Africa, stands to the right in a long white robe, pointed red boots, and with a makeshift radiate crown tied around his head. His gift of myrrh is contained in a gold vessel fashioned into a sailing ship with a long gold chain, built around a spiraling green nautilus shell.

At the centre of the scene, the baby Jesus is naked but loosely shrouded with a white cloth, resting on the lap of his mother the Virgin Mary, sitting in her characteristic blue cloak before a dilapidated stable. A donkey is eating straw in the shadows within. Behind Mary stands the elderly Joseph, listening to one of three men standing to his left (perhaps the shepherds: the face and headdress of one speaking to Joseph resembles the donkey; the one to the far right one is wearing a pair of spectacles). Unusually, the scene also includes a crowd of soldiers, perhaps echoing the political situation in the Netherlands. To Joseph's right stands two menacing soldiers, a helmeted one carrying a Lucerne hammer and wearing chainmail covered by a leather jerkin, and the other holding a crossbow with a quarrel through his hat. Behind them are a bewildered crowd of on-lookers, many with metal helmets, with an array of bladed polearms. The presence of the soldiers, the cross-shaped bow, and the child's shroud, may foreshadow the Crucifixion.

It is a cold winter's day, as demonstrated by the warm clothing worn by the subjects, such as the fur lining on Mary's sleeves. Many of the figures are slightly elongated, their faces caricatured or even grotesque, though Mary is shown naturally and not idealised. Bruegel treats his theme quite differently from depictions of the biblical scene by other painters.

The picture gives a claustrophobic impression with the figures crowded together and the viewer looking down from a slightly elevated position. The colours are bold, although the blue sky has faded to a dull grey. The technique is masterly, although the work was made very quickly, leaving an irregular ground with brushstrokes of the priming that remain visible through the paint layer, and visible underdrawing. The design principally draws inspiration from a c. 1485–1500 Adoration of the Magi triptych by Hieronymus Bosch (Prado, Madrid), but also in parts from the c. 1510–1515 The Adoration of the Kings by Jan Gossaert (National Gallery, London). Similar figures appear in Brueghel's Adoration of the Magi in a Winter Landscape (Oskar Reinhart Collection, Winterthur).

The work is painted on an oak panel, signed and dated to the lower right: "BRVEGEL M.D.LXIIII". It was made in Brussels, in the tense period of the Spanish Netherlands shortly before the outbreak of the Eighty Years' War. It was probably made as an altarpiece, perhaps for Nicholas Jongelink. It was bought by Archduke Ernest of Austria in 1594, and entered the Hapsburg Imperial Collection. It was sold to a private collector, and was bought by the National Gallery in 1920, with funding provided by the Art Fund and the shipbroker Arthur Serena.

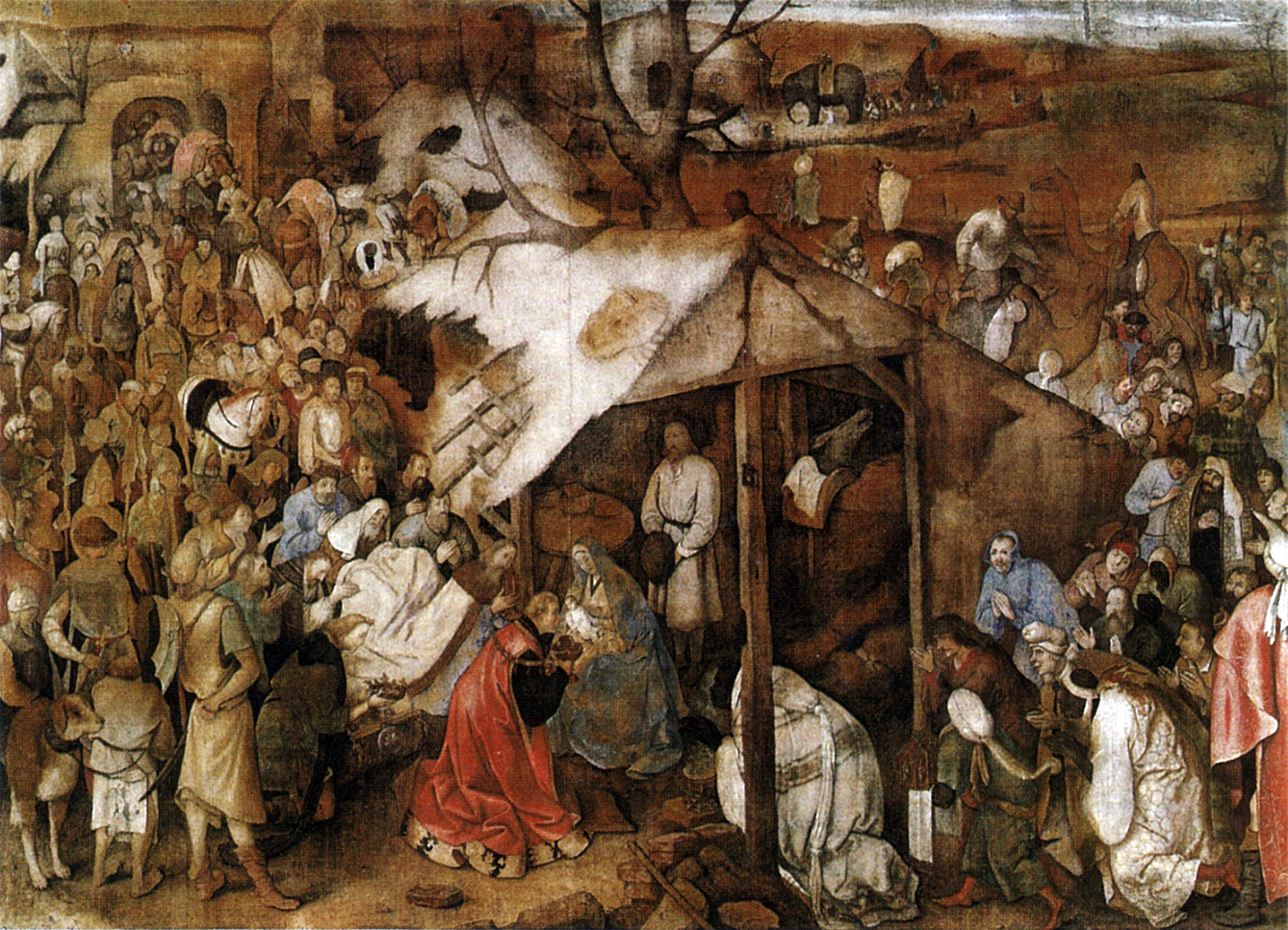
Brueghel's Adoration of the Kings, tempera on canvas, c.1556, Oldmasters Museum, Brussels

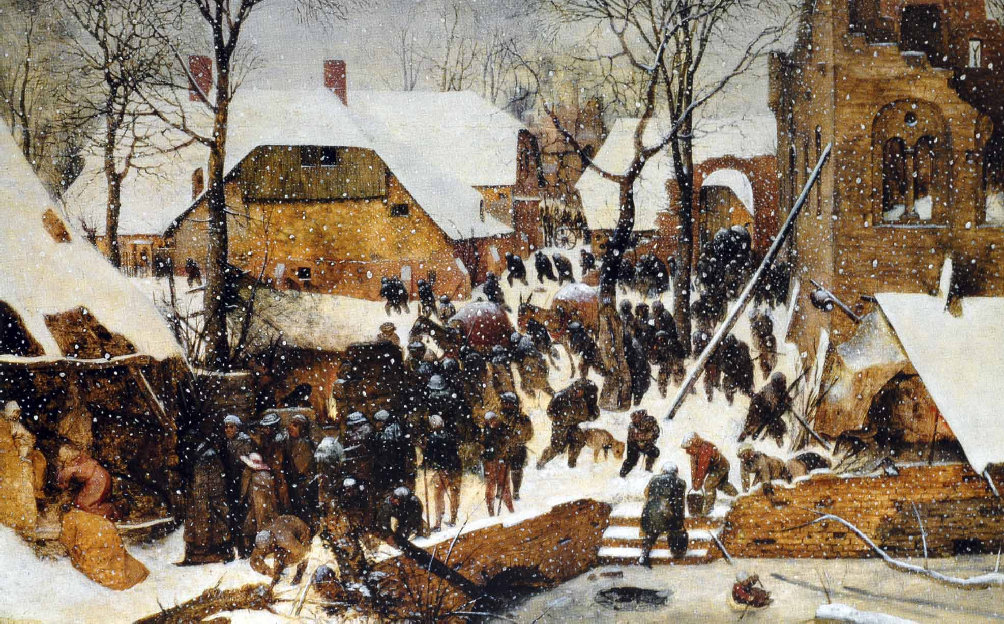
Brueghel's Adoration of the Magi in the Snow, oil on panel, 1563, Oskar Reinhart Collection Am Römerholz, Winterthur

== Detail gallery ==
Below a series of images detailing Bruegel's painting:

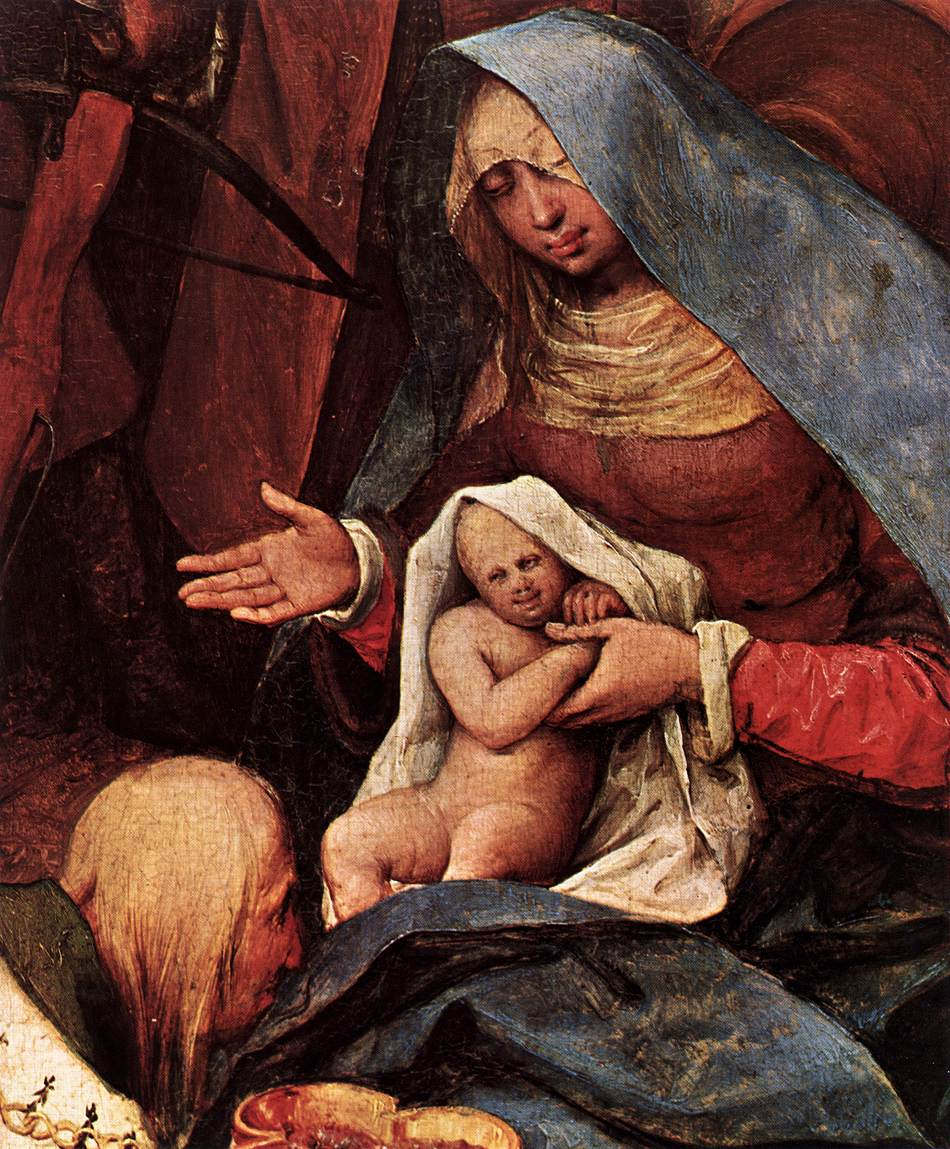
Mary and Christ Child

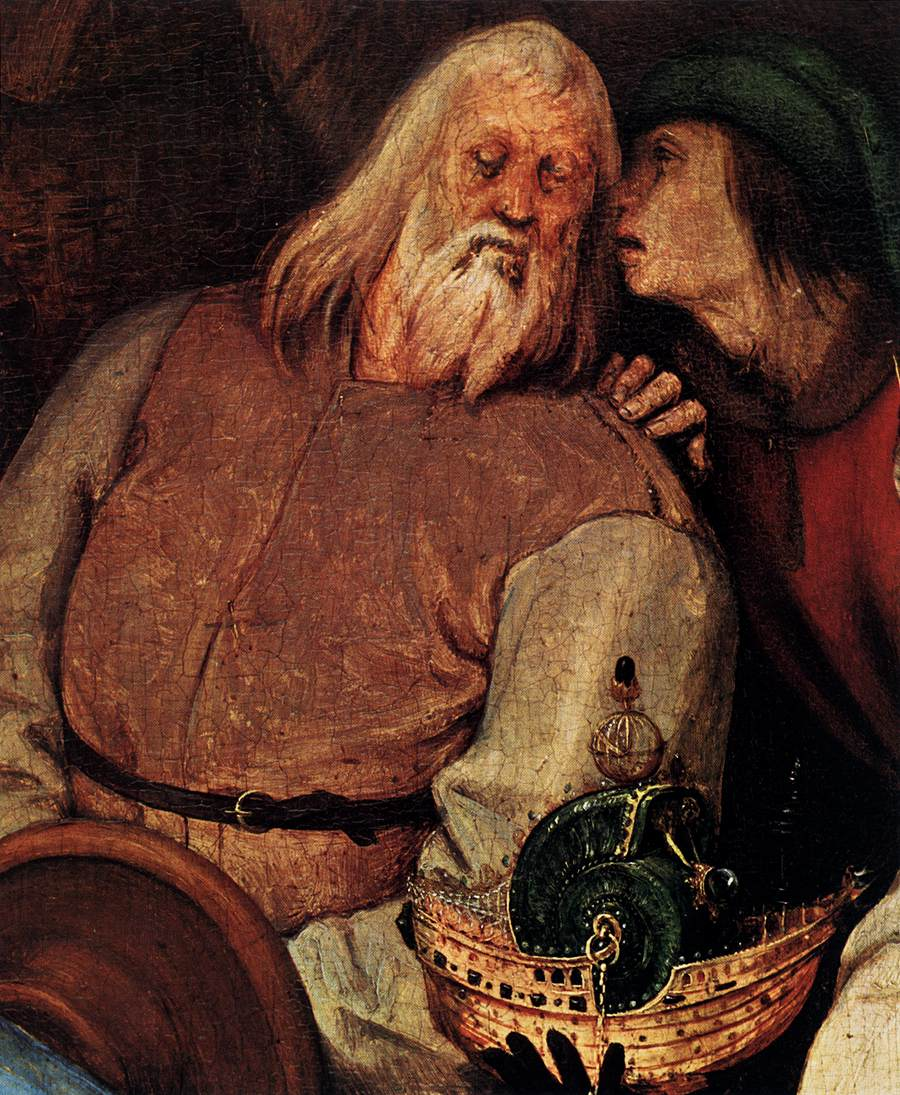
Joseph and a figure whispering

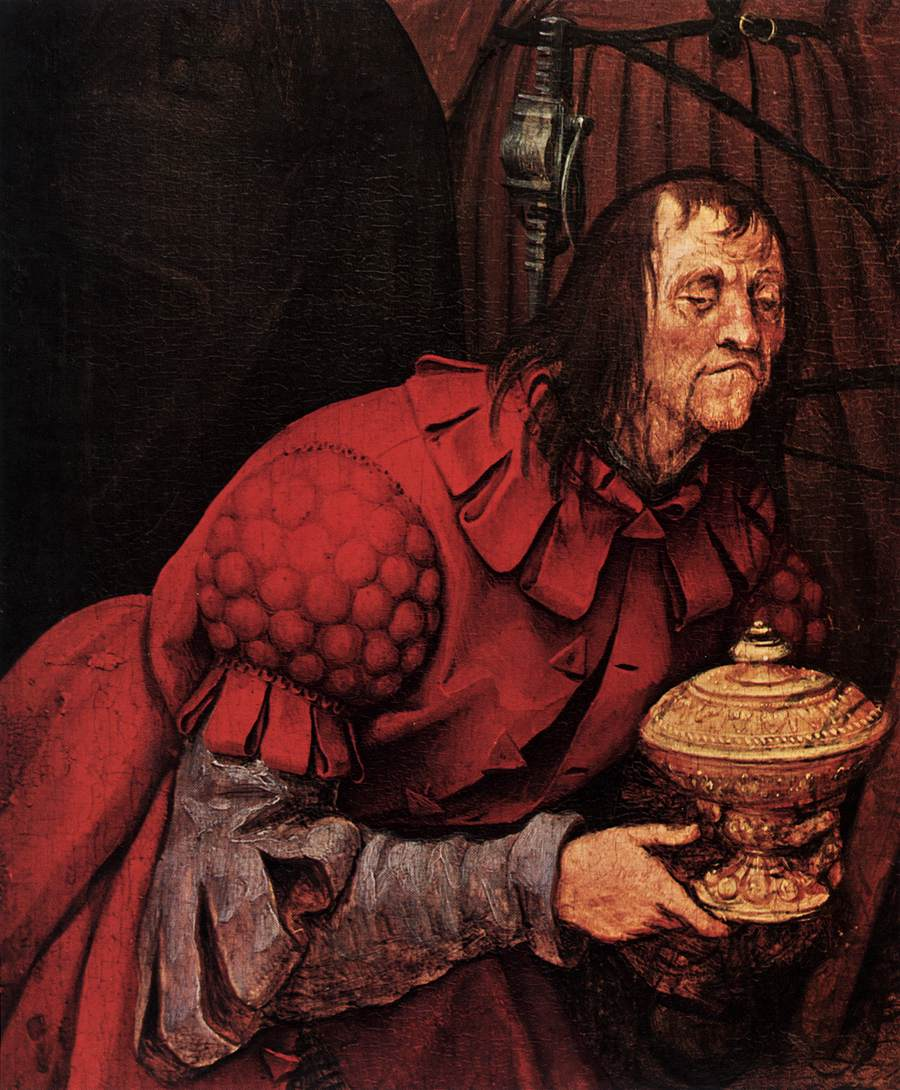
Melchior with his gift

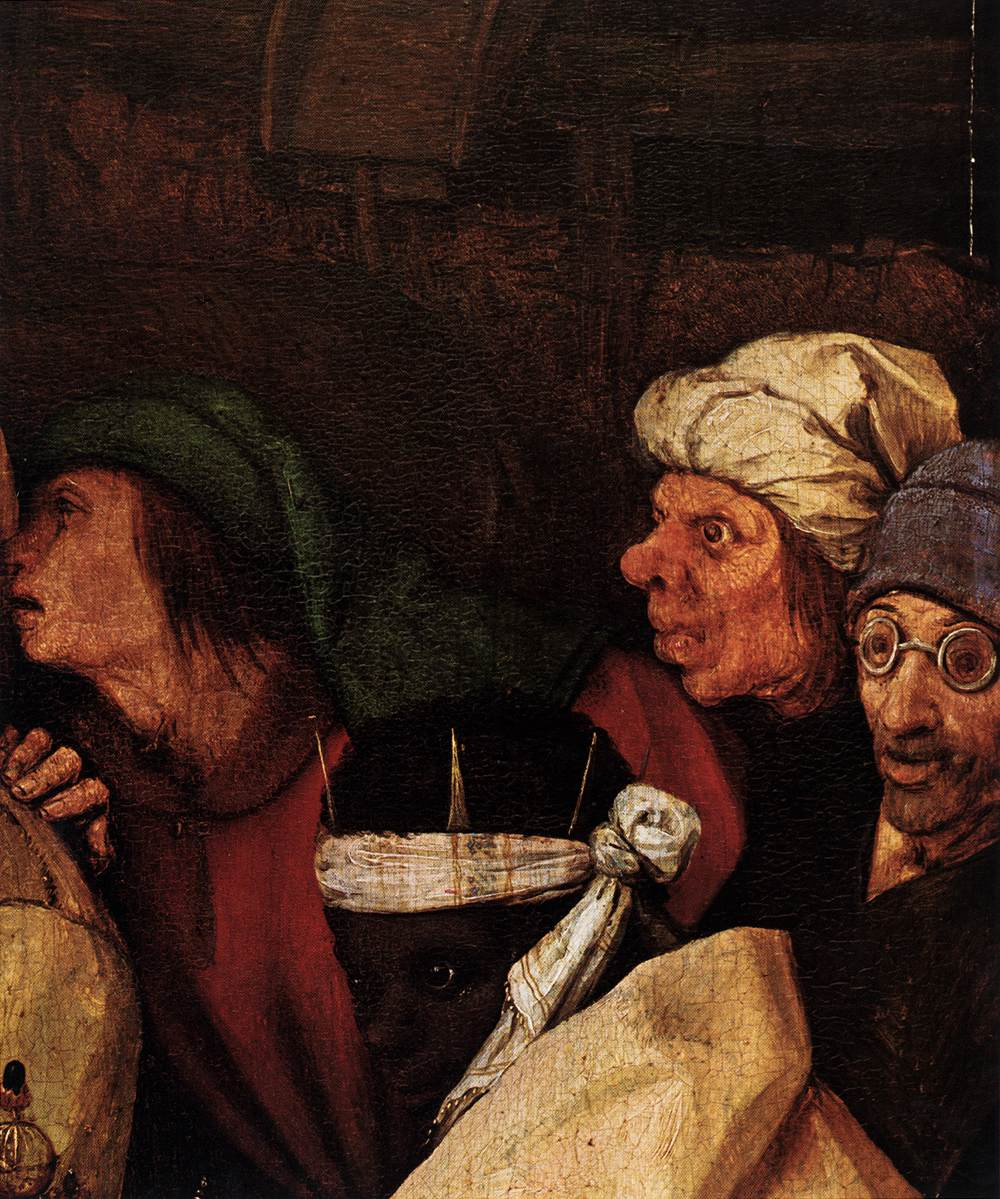
Group of figures beside Joseph

== See also ==
- List of paintings by Pieter Bruegel the Elder
