= Winter Landscape with a Bird Trap =

Painting by Pieter Bruegel the Elder

- Artist: Pieter Bruegel the Elder
- Year: 1565 (Julian)
- Medium: oil paint, oak panel
- Dimensions: 37 cm (15 in) × 56 cm (22 in)
- Location: Oldmasters Museum
- Accession: 8724

Winter Landscape with a Bird Trap, also known as The Bird Trap, is a panel painting in oils by the Netherlandish painter Pieter Bruegel the Elder, from 1565, now in the Oldmasters Museum in Brussels. It shows a village scene where people skate on a frozen river, while on the right among trees and bushes, birds gather around a bird trap. It is signed and dated at the lower right: "BRVEGEL / M.D.LXV’1". There are more early copies of this than any other painting by Pieter Bruegel the Elder, many by his much younger son Pieter Brueghel the Younger, or other members of the Brueghel family dynasty and workshop. The art historian Klaus Ertz documented 127 copies in his comprehensive monograph on the artist's son in 2000.

The painting comes from a brief period when Bruegel painted five snowy landscapes (see gallery below), thereby establishing a genre of winter landscapes in Western art. These are firstly the Adoration of the Magi in the Snow, now redated to 1563, becoming the earliest of the group. Unlike the others, this shows snow falling. The year of the Bird Trap, 1565, also produced The Hunters in the Snow, the most famous of the group, part of a series showing the months or seasons. The date of the Massacre of the Innocents is less certain, placed between 1565 and 1567, and The Census at Bethlehem is dated to 1566. The group have often been thought to have been influenced by a sharp decrease in winter temperatures in northern Europe, especially in the very hard winter of 1564/65. Bruegel died in 1569, aged about 44 or less.

The painting of the panel began with a "sketch-like underdrawing", which in particular did not include the bird-trap. The main execution is "characterized by a rather spontaneous painting process with numerous areas applied wet-in-wet". There are reddish tones which "enliven the landscape", but "appear inconsistent in colour and execution and have likely been reworked by a later hand". The village is said to be based on Sint-Anna-Pede near Brussels, whose church was also used in the background of Bruegel's The Blind Leading the Blind (1568, now Naples).

== The birds ==
While human figures occupy the frozen river and the far bank, there are only birds visible on the nearer bank on the right. It has been noted that the three in the nearest trees are, because closer to the front of the picture space, at least as large in absolute terms as the humans on the river. On the near bank an old door has been propped up by a stick; a rope leads from the trap to one of the houses. Some sort of food has been scattered below the door, and a crowd of birds are eating the bait; soon the rope will be yanked, and the door fall.

The birds and bird-trap have attracted much attention from art historians. The motif is not common, and it is not in the underdrawing, nor "reserved" (the area left blank in the background painting). It was therefore painted over a snowy background at a late stage. Many art historians have tried to draw a moral or allegorical meaning from the painting, without any suggestion achieving wide acceptance.

== Bruegel's other snow paintings ==
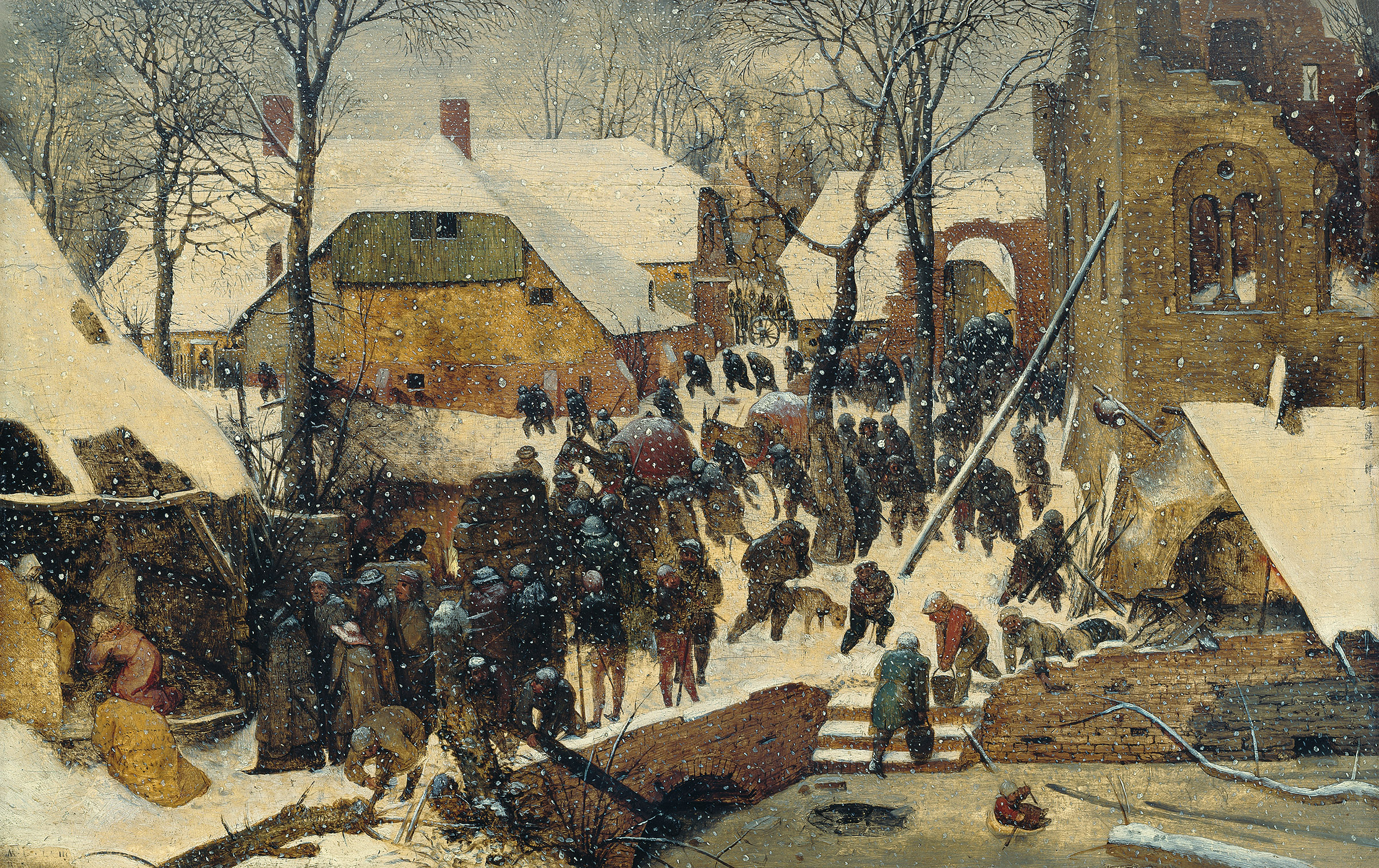
Adoration of the Magi in the Snow (1563)

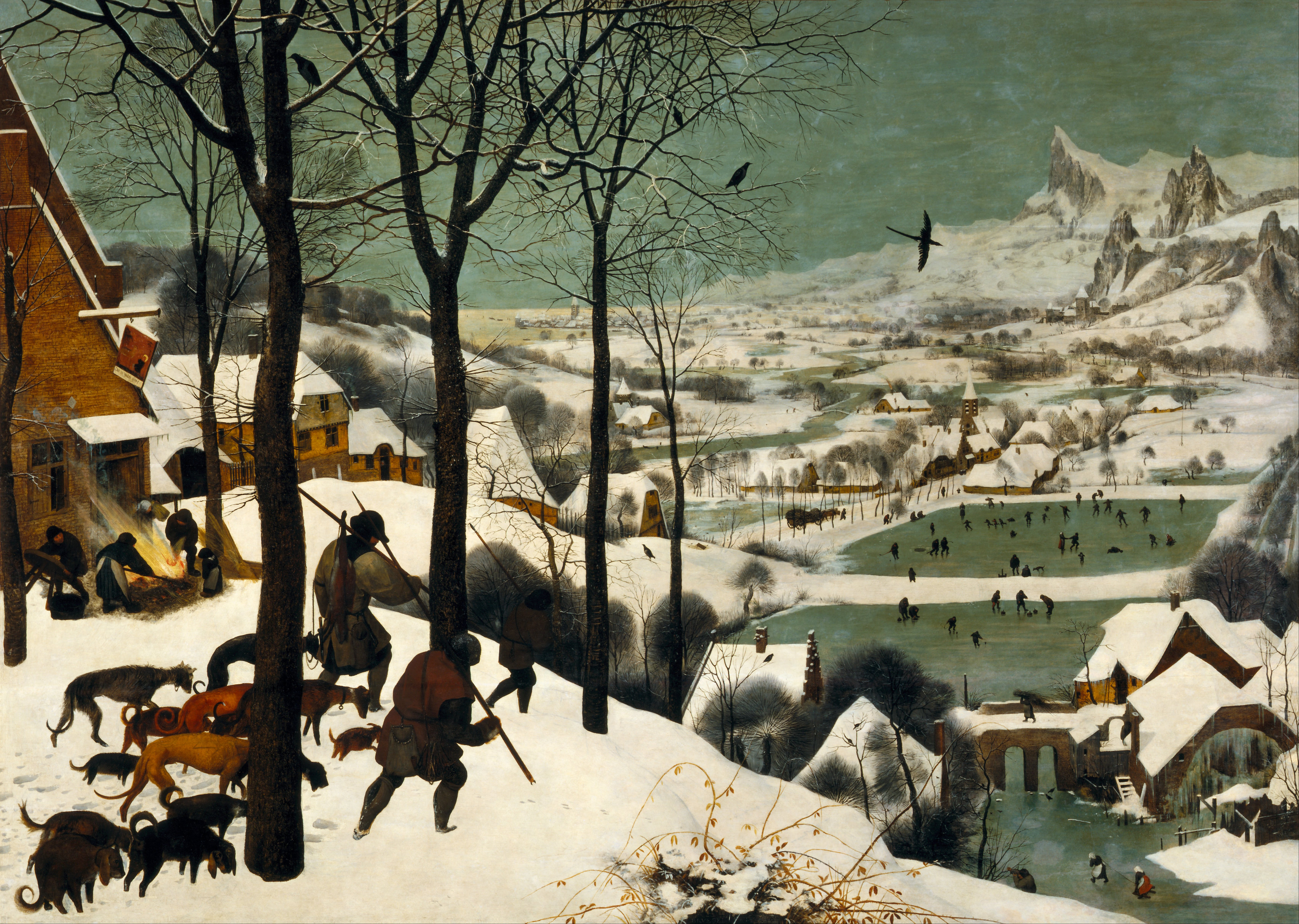
The Hunters in the Snow (1565)

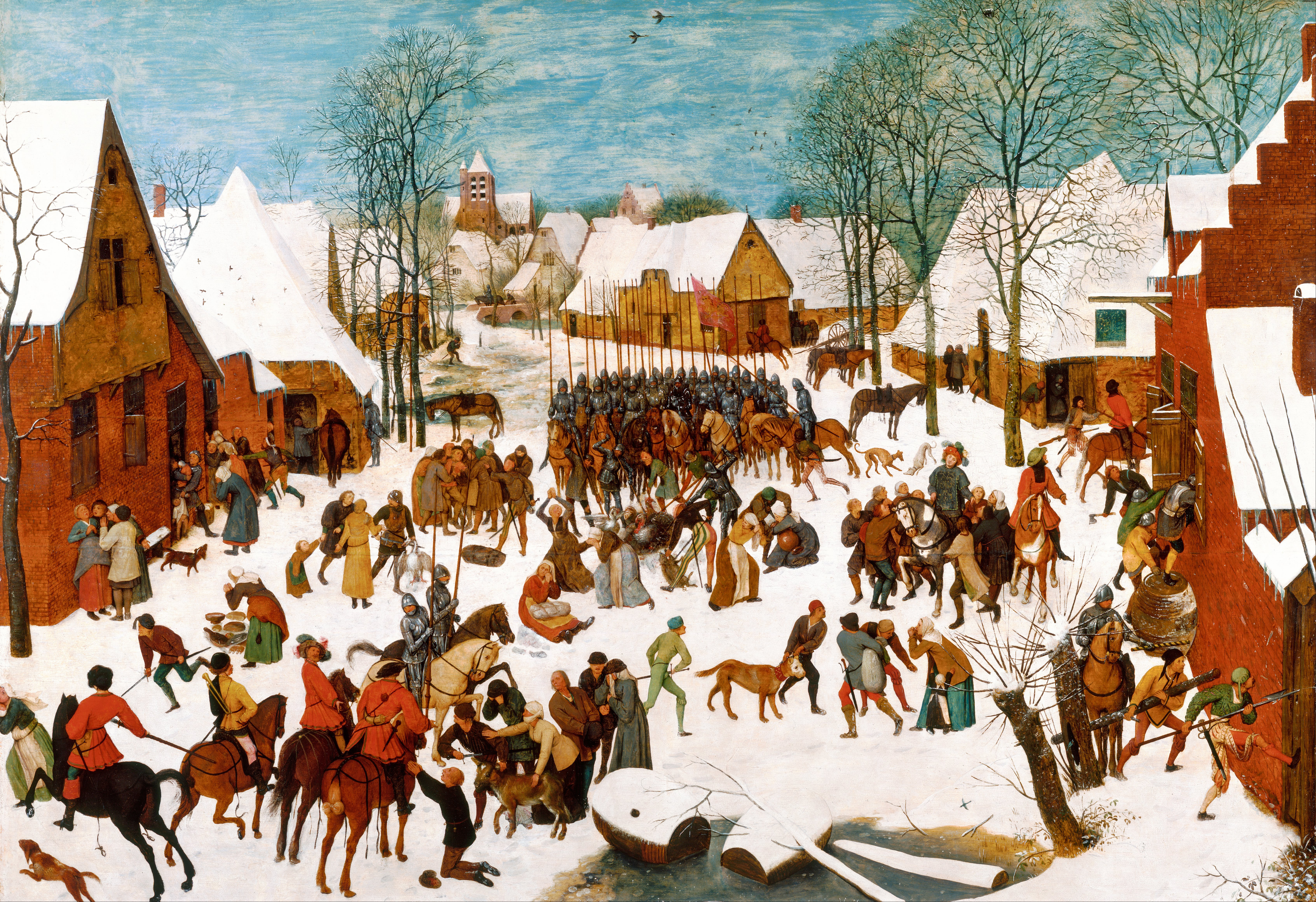
Massacre of the Innocents (c.1565-1567)

The Census at Bethlehem (1566)

== Copies ==
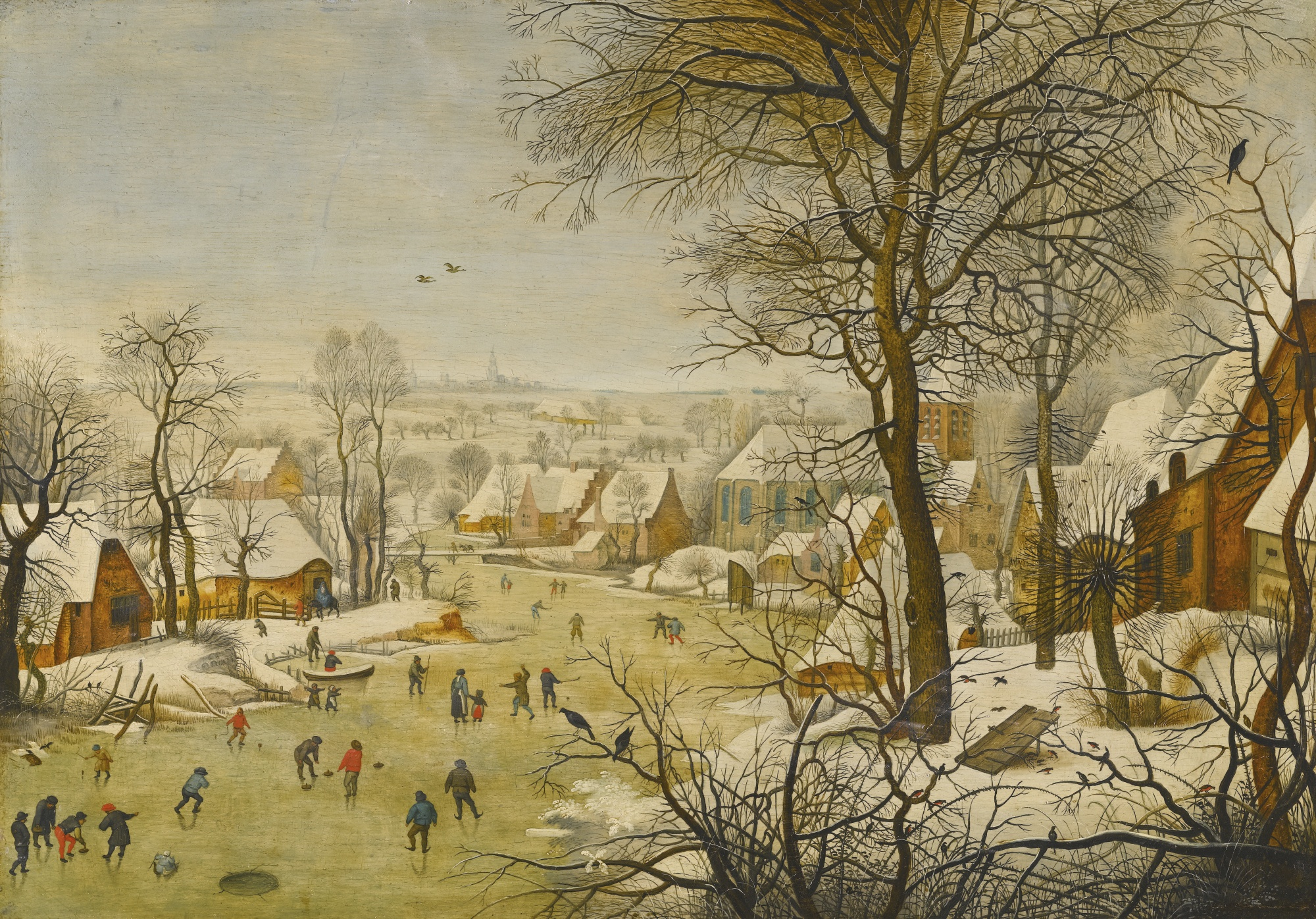
Copy by Pieter Brueghel II sold in July 2014 by Sotheby's London for £3.4 million

Of the 127 documented copies in 2000, Ertz lists 45 as by Pieter Brueghel the Younger, 51 doubtful, and 31 rejected-but-notable, and all of these were created in the 17th century. Pieter Brueghel the Younger's dated copies range between 1601 and 1626. Since 2000 the discussion has continued and possibly this painting employs motifs from some earlier lost original by Bruegel's younger son Jan Brueghel the Elder, along the lines of The Hunters in the Snow. This view has not attracted support in subsequent scholarship.

Each known copy seems to emphasize subtle details, whether it is in the game of curling, the arrangement of the bird trap, the hole in the ice, or various moralistic and religious themes. Two copies documented by Ertz depict the Rest on the Flight into Egypt. The variation of motifs and their popularity in the copies has led to much speculation and comparison of contemporary engravings and the later popularity of the winter landscape as its own art genre, which enabled painters such as Hendrick Avercamp to build a business around painting them.

The copies mostly show a slightly extended scene compared to the original, which is most obvious at the bottom left corner.

== Gallery of copies ==
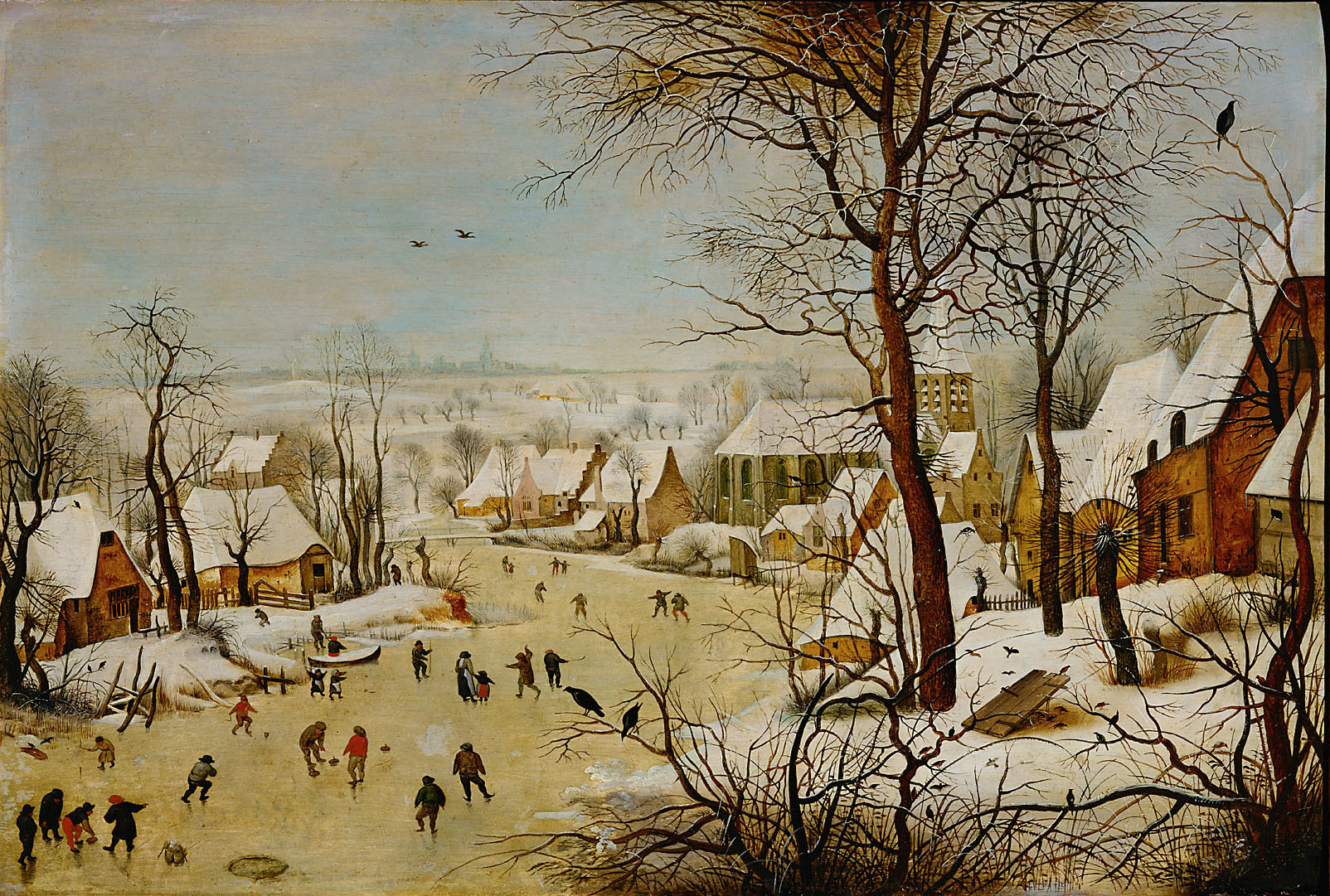
Version owned by Archduke Leopold of Austria, Kunsthistorisches Museum

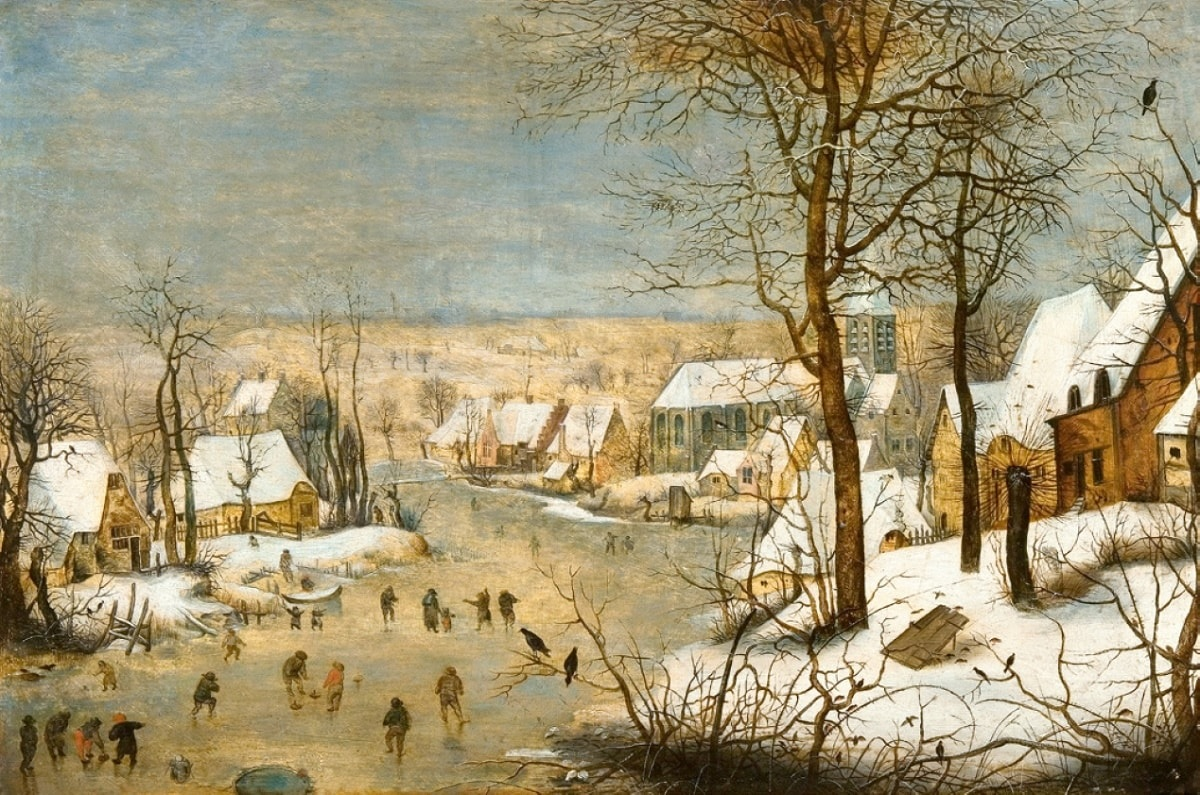
Version owned by the National Museum, Wrocław

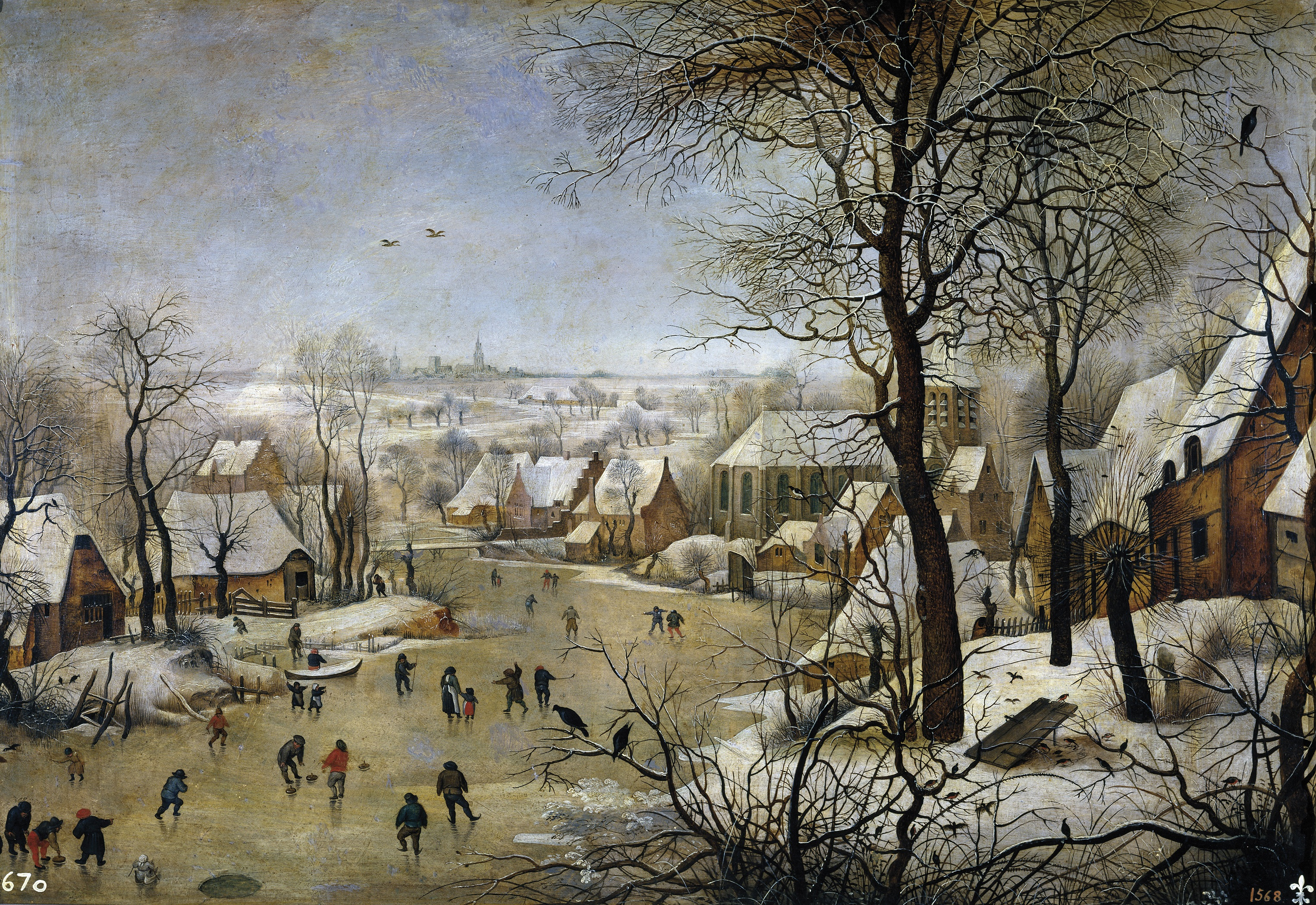
Version owned by Elisabeth Farnese, Prado

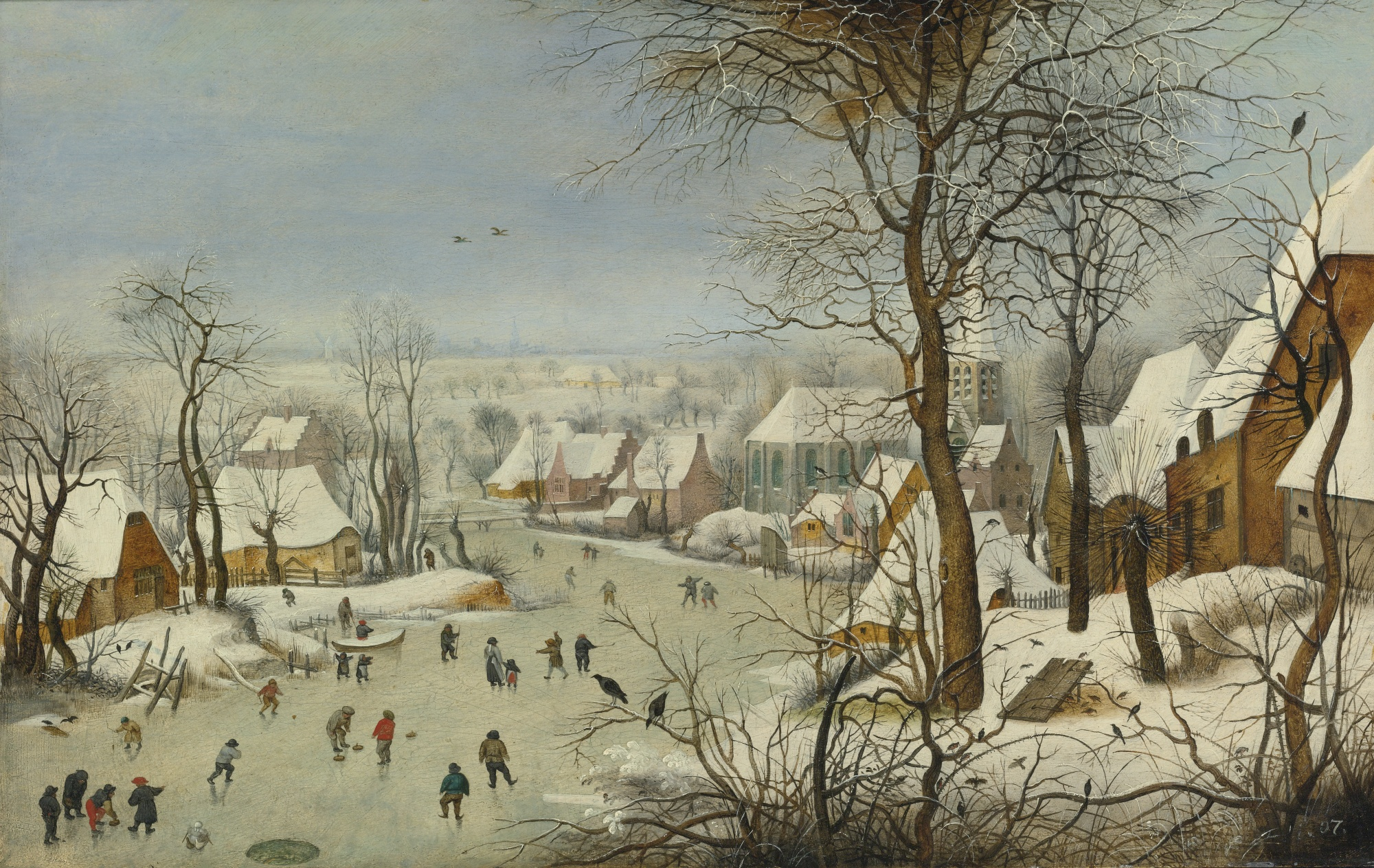
Version sold in January 2014 by Sotheby's NY for $2.3 million

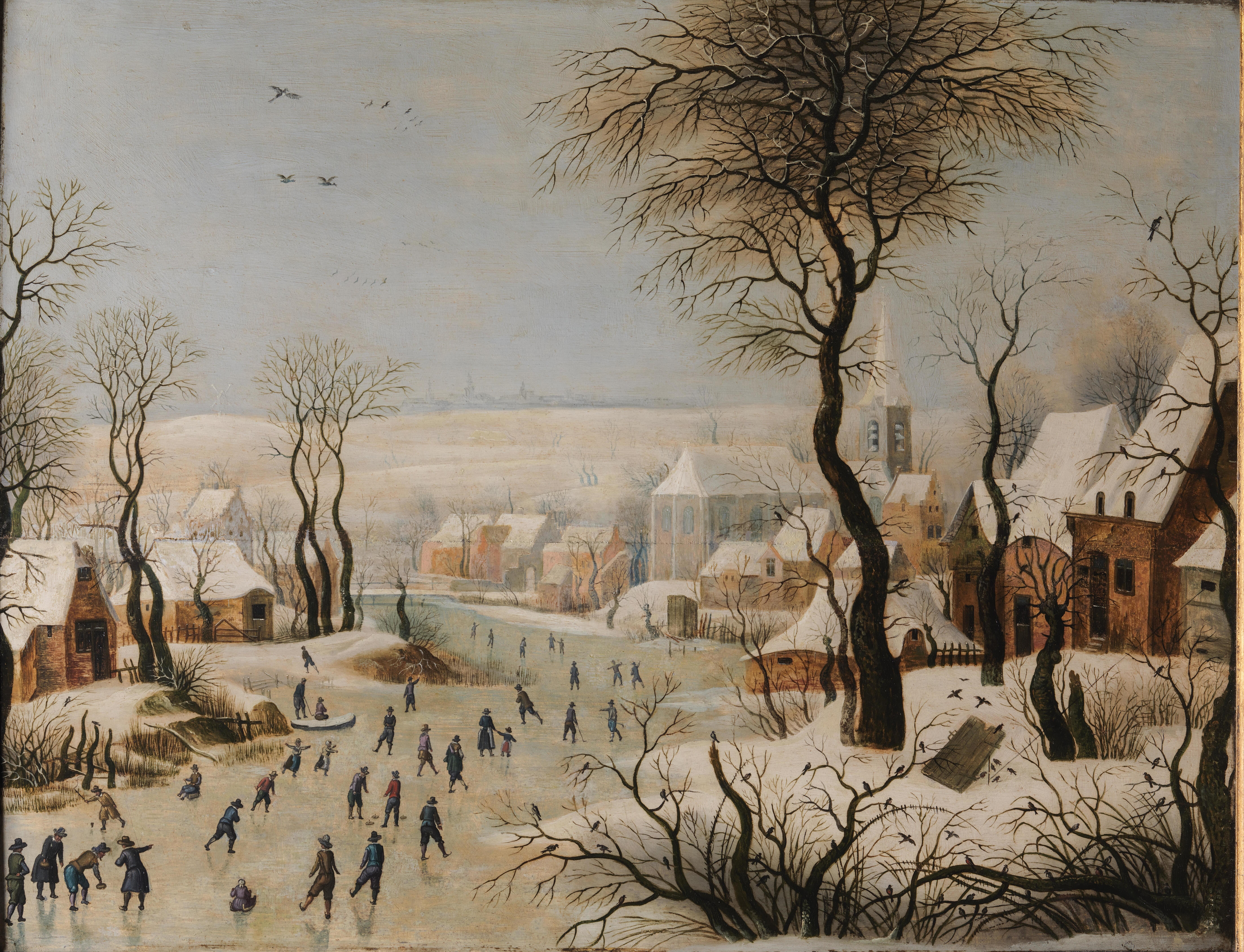
Copy after Pieter Brueghel II, owned by Christian IV of Denmark, Rosenborg Castle

== Provenance ==
The early history of the painting is not known. Among so many early copies, the status of the painting now in Brussels was not widely recognised until it was "rediscovered in 1925", and there was repeated questioning of its position. After it successfully emerged from a re-investigation in 2012, many years after acceptance had become general, this question may finally be laid to rest. The painting was in a private collection in Brussels until bequeathed to the Oldmasters Museum in 1973 by Mrs Delporte-Livrauw and Dr Franz Delporte.

== See also ==
- List of paintings by Pieter Bruegel the Elder
