= Massacre of the Innocents (Bruegel) =

Paintings by Pieter Bruegel the Elder and Pieter Brueghel the Younger

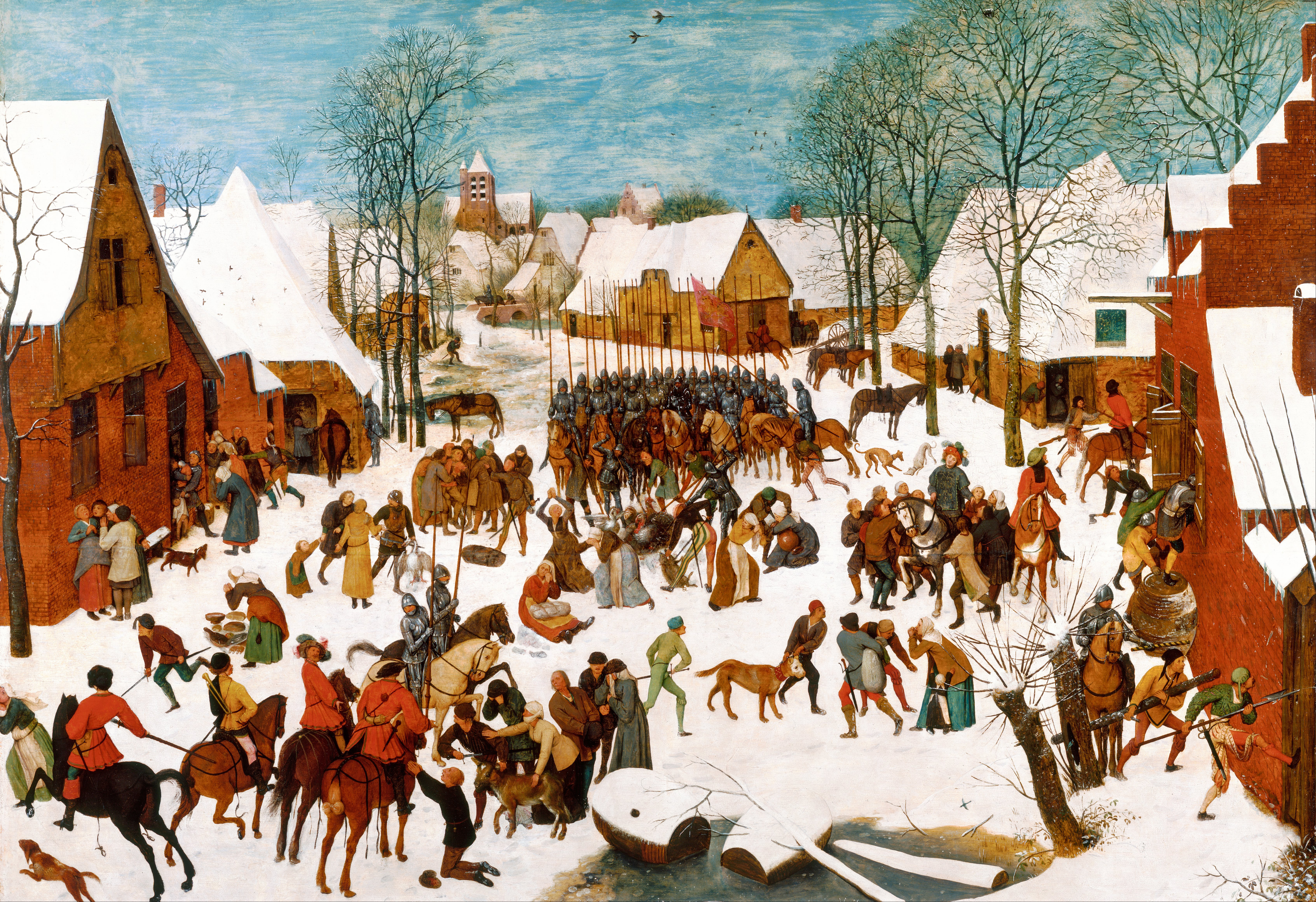
Version in the Royal Collection, the dead children painted over by order of Rudolf II, Holy Roman Emperor

Several oil-on-oak-panel versions of The Massacre of the Innocents were painted by 16th-century Netherlandish painters Pieter Bruegel the Elder and his son Pieter Brueghel the Younger. The work translates the Biblical account of the Massacre of the Innocents into a winter scene in the Southern Netherlands in the prelude to the Dutch Revolt against Spanish rule, also known as the Eighty Years' War.

What is now thought to be the only version by Bruegel the Elder (c.1565-1567) is in the British Royal Collection; for some time at Hampton Court Palace, since 2017 (to late 2024) it has been in Windsor Castle. It appears that Rudolf II, Holy Roman Emperor ordered it overpainted to hide images of dead and dying children, which have been replaced by food items and sacks of goods.

Many other versions are attributed to Pieter Brueghel the Younger, with different art historians listing as many as 7 or 14 versions, including leading examples in the Kunsthistorisches Museum in Vienna, in the Oldmasters Museum in Brussels, and in the National Museum of Art of Romania in Bucharest. Most of these show the dead children of the original composition. Pieter Brueghel the Younger also painted his own different composition of the Massacre of the Innocents: one example is in the Oldmasters Museum.

== Background ==
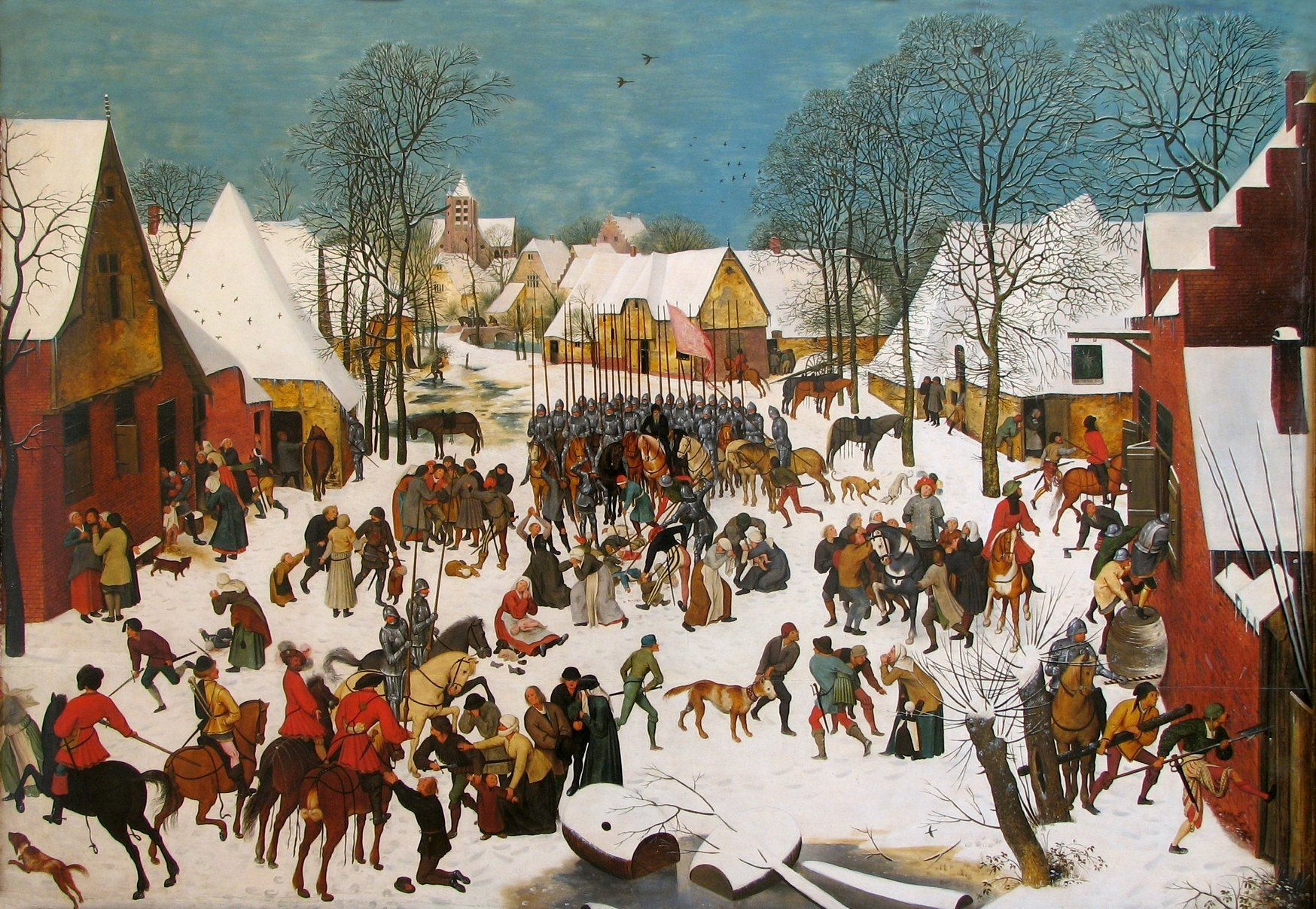
Copy by Pieter Brueghel the Younger, Brukenthal Museum, Sibiu, Romania, with the children included

The painting depicts an event described in the Gospel of Saint Matthew 2:16-18 in the New Testament of the Bible: after King Herod was told by the Magi of the birth of Jesus in Bethlehem, he ordered his soldiers to kill all of the infant children in Bethlehem below the age of 2 years. (In the Biblical account, an angel warned Jesus's family, and they escaped to Egypt.) The Massacre of the Innocents is commemorated on 28 December in the Catholic, Lutheran and Anglican church calendars, as the fourth day of Christmastide.

Bruegel translated the scene to a 16th-century Netherlandish village, where the Flemish villagers are attacked by Spanish soldiers and German mercenaries, possibly as a commentary on the behaviour of occupying Spanish troops in the prelude to the Dutch Revolt against Spanish rule, also known as the Eighty Years' War. The very severe winter of 1564-65 may have inspired the snow-covered scene, with icicles hanging from the eaves and a pond covered with a thick layer of ice: the deep winter also inspired his 1565 painting The Hunters in the Snow.

== Versions ==
The version by Bruegel the Elder in the Royal Collection was acquired by Holy Roman Emperor Rudolph II and was in Prague by about 1600. Rudolph disliked the graphic scene, which depicted many infants being slaughtered by soldiers carrying his own imperial heraldry of the double-headed eagle, and had the children painted over with details – small objects including food and animals – so that it became a scene of plunder not a massacre of babies. The later overpainting became apparent during conservation work in 1998, and Lorne Campbell identified the painting in the Royal Collection as the original version by Bruegel the Elder. This version was probably one of many paintings from the imperial collection looted from Prague Castle by a Swedish army in 1648, at the end of the Thirty Years' War: it was in the collection of Queen Christina by 1652, and came into the British Royal Collection when it was acquired by Charles II in exile at Breda in 1660. It is signed "BRVEGEL" 1565–67, and measures 102 × 155 centimetres (40 × 61 in).

The version at the Kunsthistorisches Museum in Vienna was long thought to be the original by Pieter Bruegel the Elder. It was in the Neue Burg in the early 17th century, and given to the Gemäldegalerie in 1748. It is now thought to be a copy by his son, Pieter Breughel the Younger, or his studio. As it has not been overpainted, it shows the original details of the massacre; this is also the case with the other early versions. It is signed "BRVEG". A version signed by Breughel the Younger and dated 1593, one of his earliest known paintings, is held by the Musée des Beaux-Arts in Lons-le-Saunier.

Another copy signed ".BRVEGEL. 15.." was in Sweden, and then in the Hermitage Museum, before being sold by the early Soviet government. It was sold in Paris in 1979, at Sotheby's in 2005, and then at Christie's in 2012 for £1.8m, as by Pieter Breughel the Younger. A further version at the Brukenthal Museum in Sibiu, Romania is signed 'P. BRVEGEL'. A version sold at Sotheby's in 2009, with provenance in Belgium and the Netherlands, also attributed to Pieter Breughel the Younger, was sold for £4.6m.

== Description ==
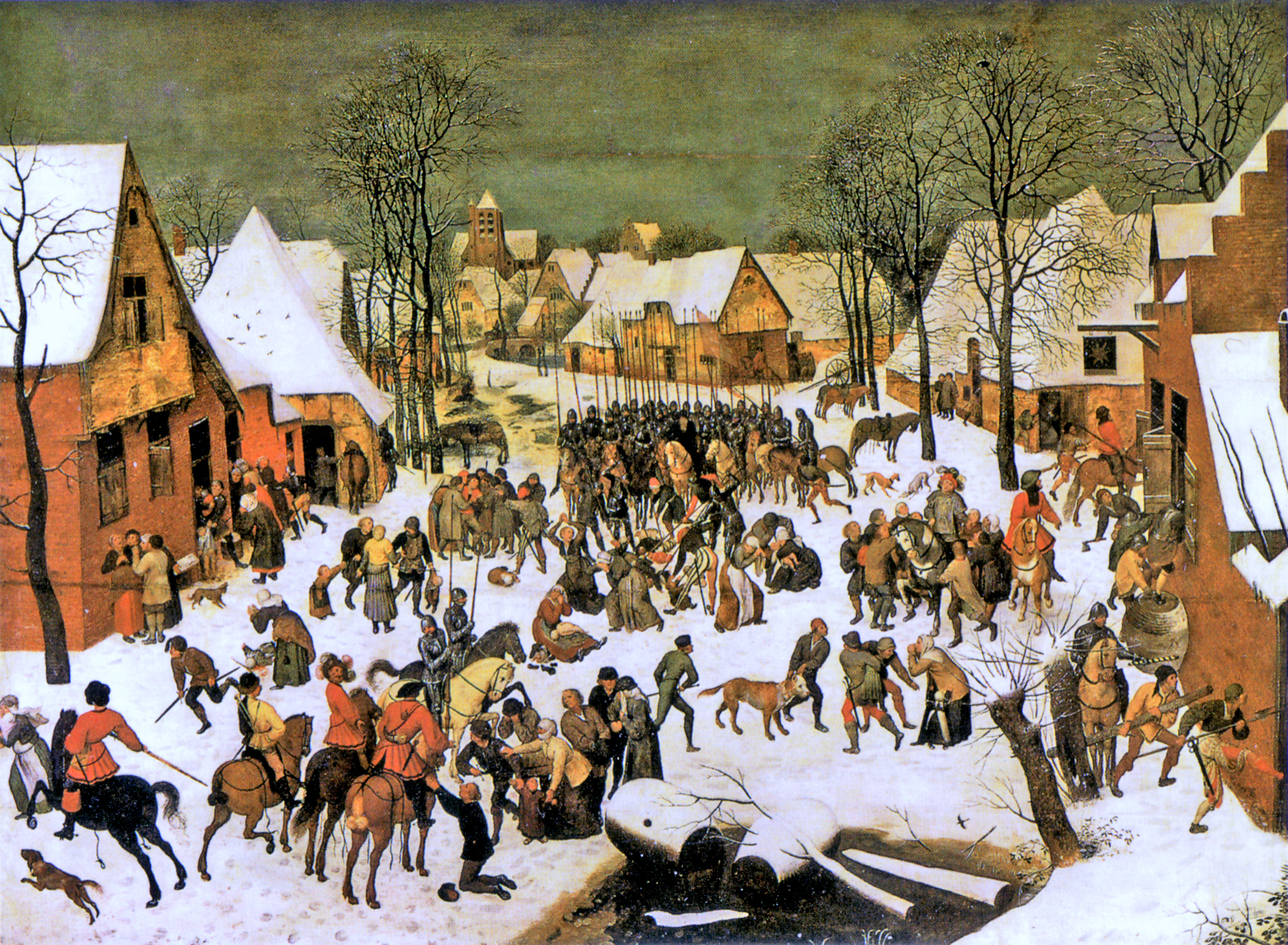
Version in the Kunsthistorisches Museum, Vienna, long regarded as the original.

Like several of Bruegel's paintings, such as the Netherlandish Proverbs and Children's Games, the painting includes many parallel narrative scenes in a larger composition. Working from the church in the background towards the foreground: a mounted soldier with a lance guards a bridge. To the left, a man tries to hide a child. Moving forward and further towards the left, one soldier urinates against a wall; and further left, another soldier guides some women into a house, and a third soldier drags an infant out of another house (one of few infants remaining alive in the painting, and one of few not overpainted in the version in the Royal Collection). A group of four villagers mourns nearby.

Moving right, towards the centre of the painting, a lone woman stands grieving over her dead baby lying with blood spilled on the snow (overpainted in the version in the Royal Collection with meats and cheeses), and a couple ask a soldier to take their daughter not their baby son (overpainted in the version in the Royal Collection as a large bird). A crowd of villagers surround and confront a red-coated soldier standing over a dead baby (overpainted as a bundle); or, the villagers try to stop a father from attacking the soldier that killed his baby. A seated woman grieves with her dead baby on her lap (changed to a bundle).

Continuing to the right, at the centre of the painting, a group of Spanish soldiers in black armour stab with spears at a group of babies (changed to animals) in front of a large group of mounted soldiers also with lances and wearing black armour. One of the mounted soldiers may be holding a standard of five gold crosses on a white ground, the heraldic arms of Jerusalem, which alludes to the fact that the Habsburgs, rulers of the Spanish Netherlands, also claimed the title of King of Jerusalem. A soldier with striped breeches stabs one child (overpainted as a boar) and another stabs at a baby held by a woman (overpainted as a jug). Further to the right, a single mounted man is surrounded by a group of protesting villagers: originally he was a herald wearing a tabard decorated with a Habsburg double-headed eagle.

At the far right, two mounted soldiers wear red jackets and rounded metal helmets. Some soldiers on foot are breaking into an inn: the inn sign originally showed a star linking it with the Star of Bethlehem (overpainted in the version in the Royal Collection). One soldier wields an axe and another has a log to use as a battering ram; three are climbing into an open window, and one with a halberd kicks at a door, shaking off an overhanging icicle which threatens to fall on his head. Moving across the foreground, right to left, a baby (changed to a bundle) has been torn from a mother and her small daughter; a soldier holds back a large dog; and further the left, in the immediate foreground, a soldier is about to stab a child (overpainted as a calf). At the far left, another soldier chases after a woman.

A group of mounted soldiers stands in the left foreground, two in black armour with lances, a trumpeter in a yellow jacket, and three with red jackets. One may be intended to be the Duke of Alba, the notoriously harsh commander of the Spanish army in the Netherlands: the resemblance becomes clearer in the later paintings by Brueghel the Younger.

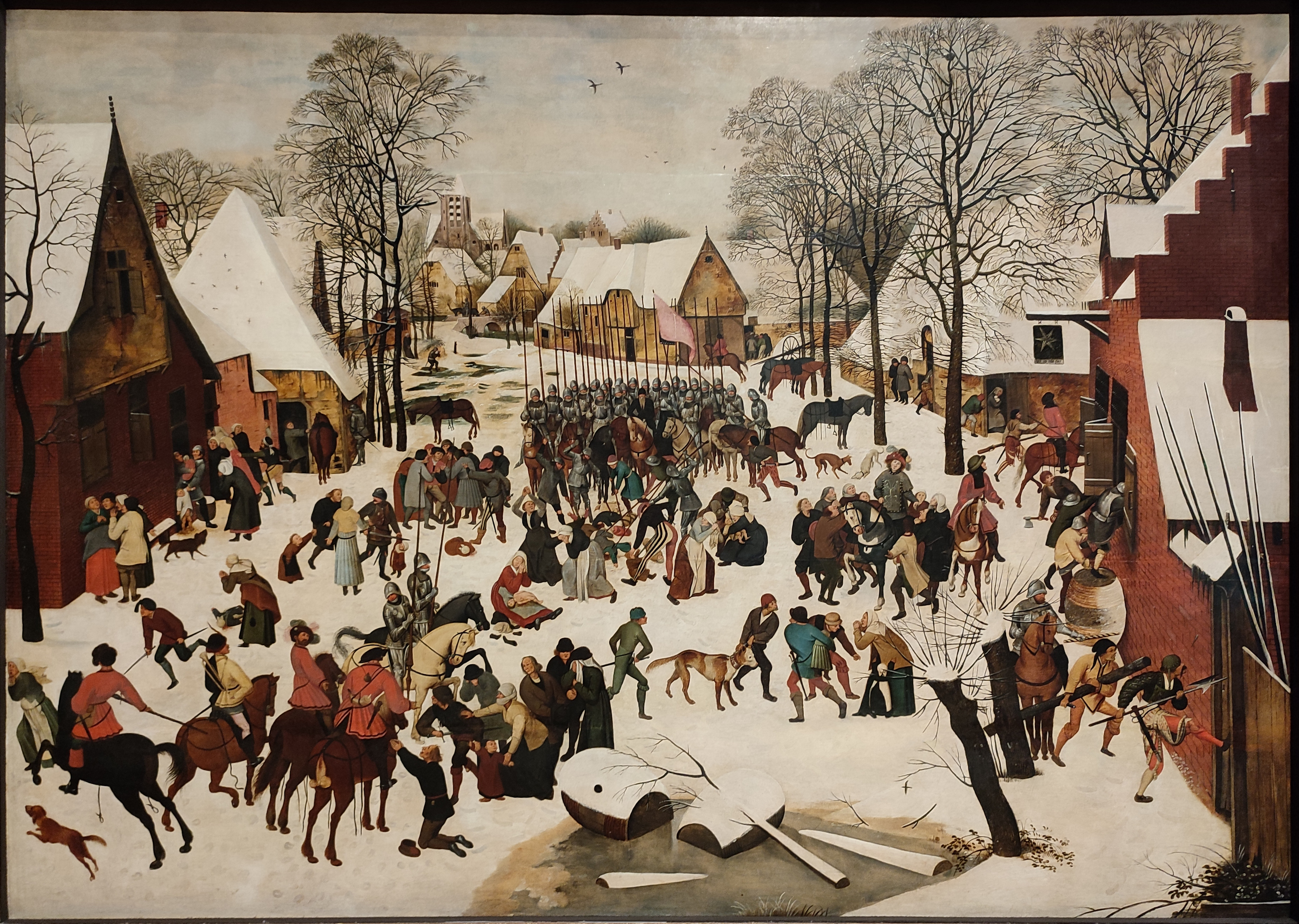
Version in the Oldmasters Museum, Brussels

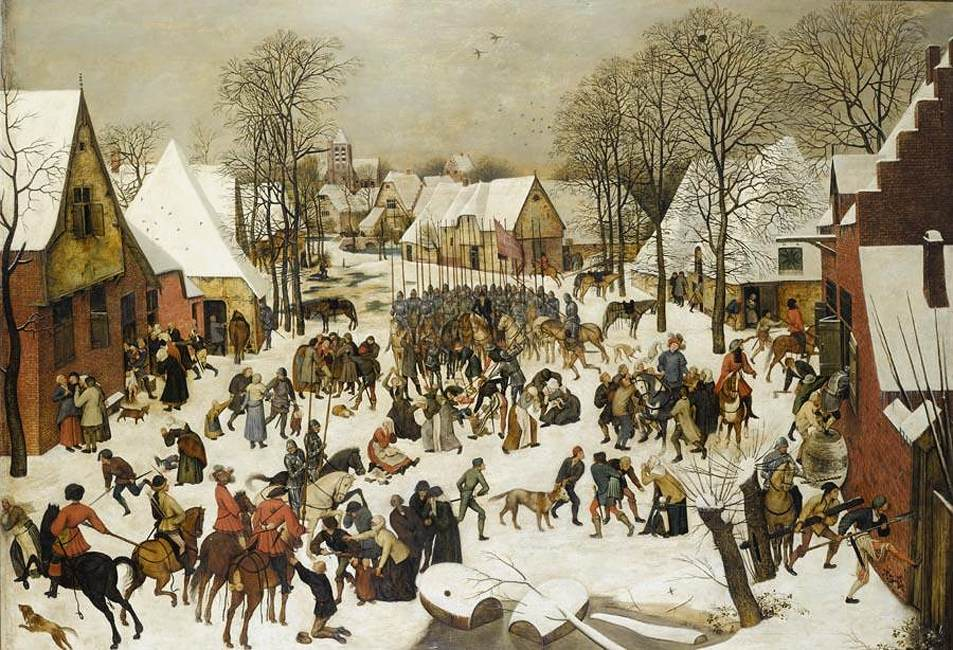
Version in a private collection

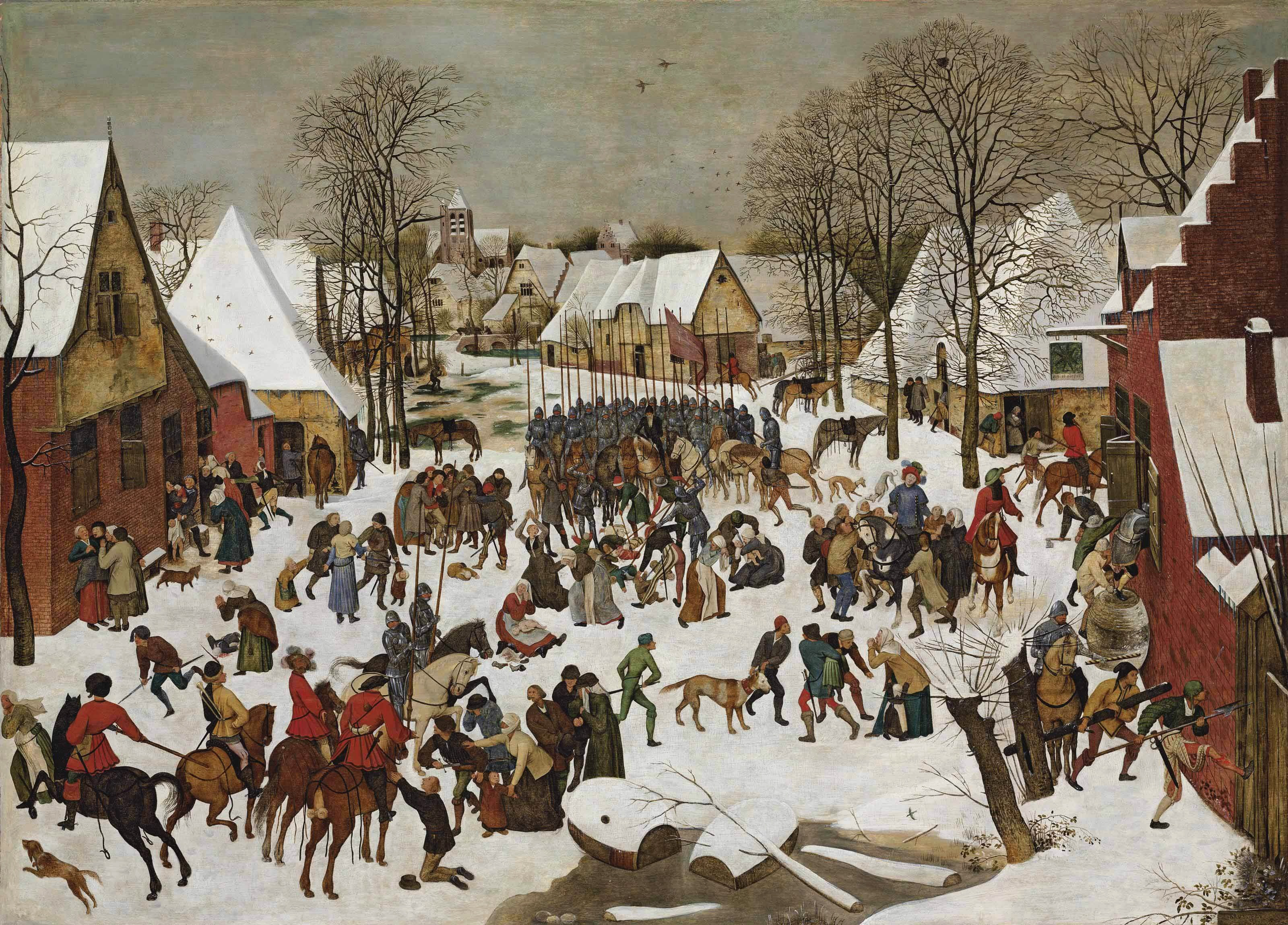
Another version sold in 2012

== Bruegel's other snow paintings ==
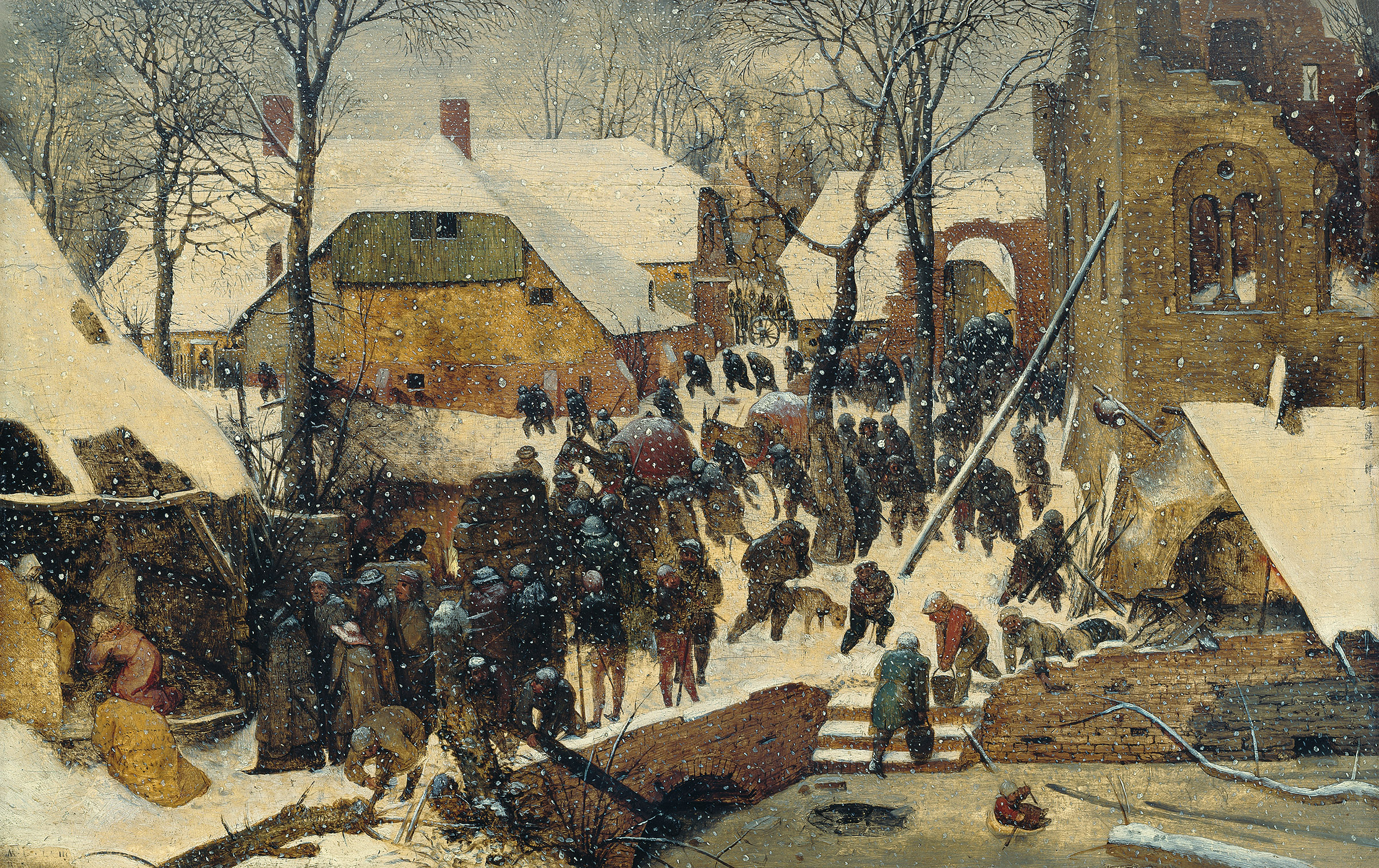
Adoration of the Magi in the Snow (1563)

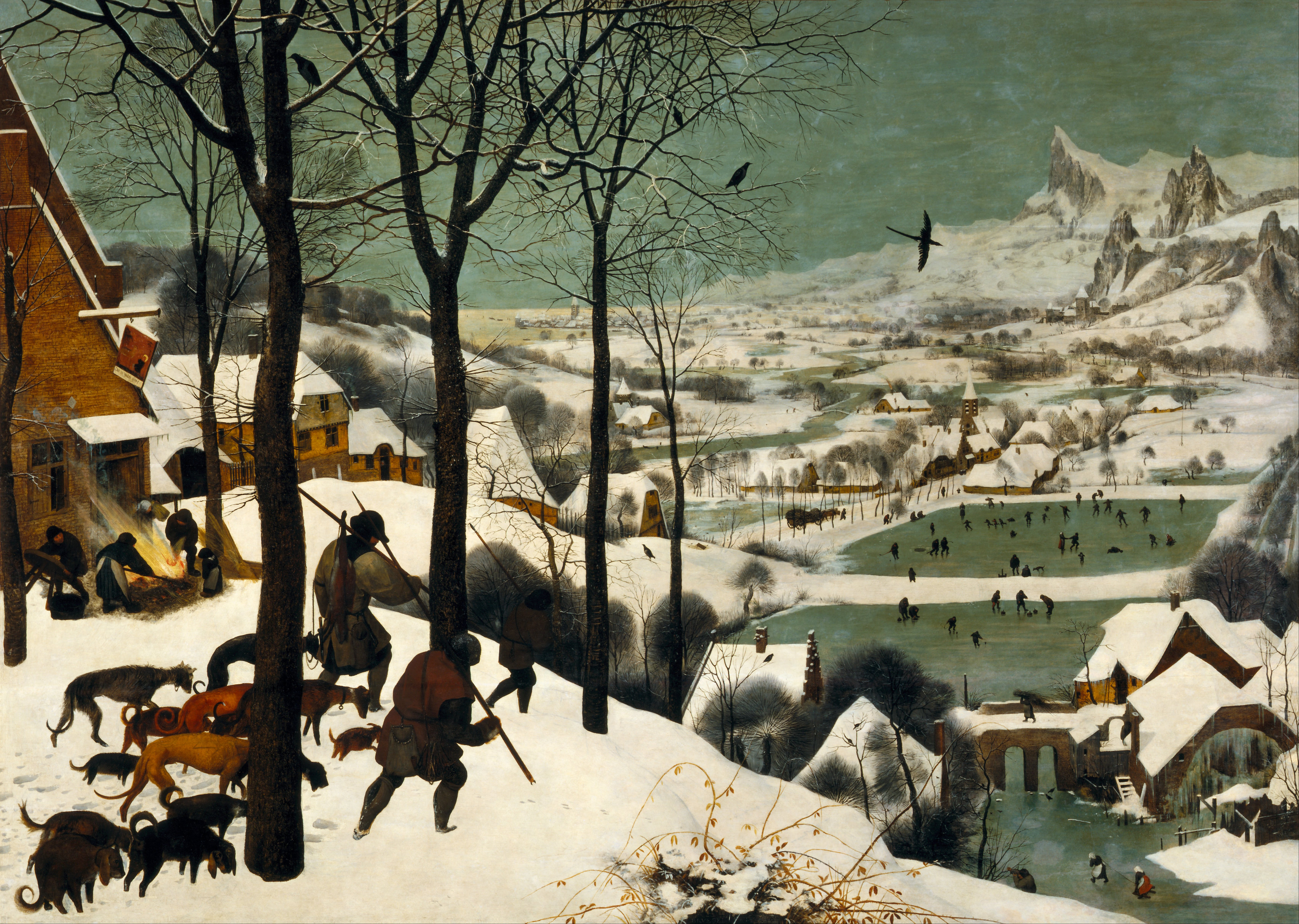
The Hunters in the Snow (1565)

Winter Landscape with Ice skaters and Bird trap (1565)

The Census at Bethlehem (1566)

== See also ==
- List of paintings by Pieter Bruegel the Elder
