= Adoration of the Magi in the Snow =

Painting by Pieter Bruegel the Elder

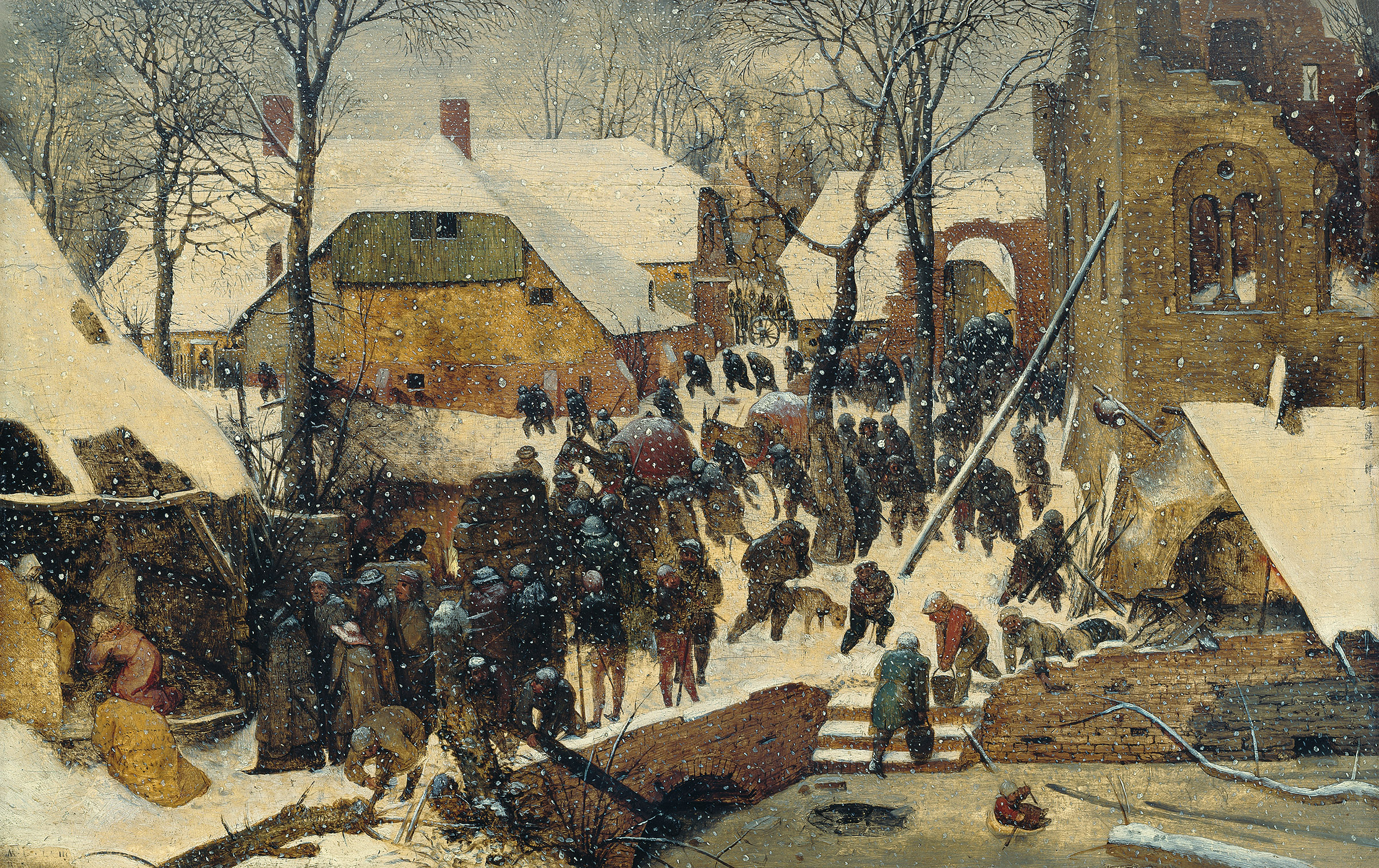
- Artist: Pieter Bruegel the Elder
- Year: 1563
- Medium: oil on oak panel
- Dimensions: 35 cm × 55 cm (14 in × 22 in)
- Location: Am Römerholz, Winterthur

The Adoration of the Magi in the Snow (or Adoration of the Magi in a Winter Landscape) is a painting in oils on oak panel of 1563, by Pieter Bruegel the Elder, now in the Oskar Reinhart Collection Am Römerholz in Winterthur, Switzerland. With two Italian exceptions, it is thought to be the first depiction of falling snow in a Western painting, the snowflakes boldly shown by dots of white across the whole scene, added when the work was otherwise completed.

The very common subject of the Adoration of the Magi, showing the visit of the three Biblical Magi to the baby Jesus and his parents, is given a resolutely down to earth treatment, set in a contemporary Netherlandish village. The weather is dull, the size of the painting relatively small, and the figures all well wrapped-up, making some details more easily seen in the numerous early copies, many by Bruegel's son Pieter Brueghel the Younger. These generally show snow on the ground, but not actually falling. It was Bruegel's second painting of the subject.

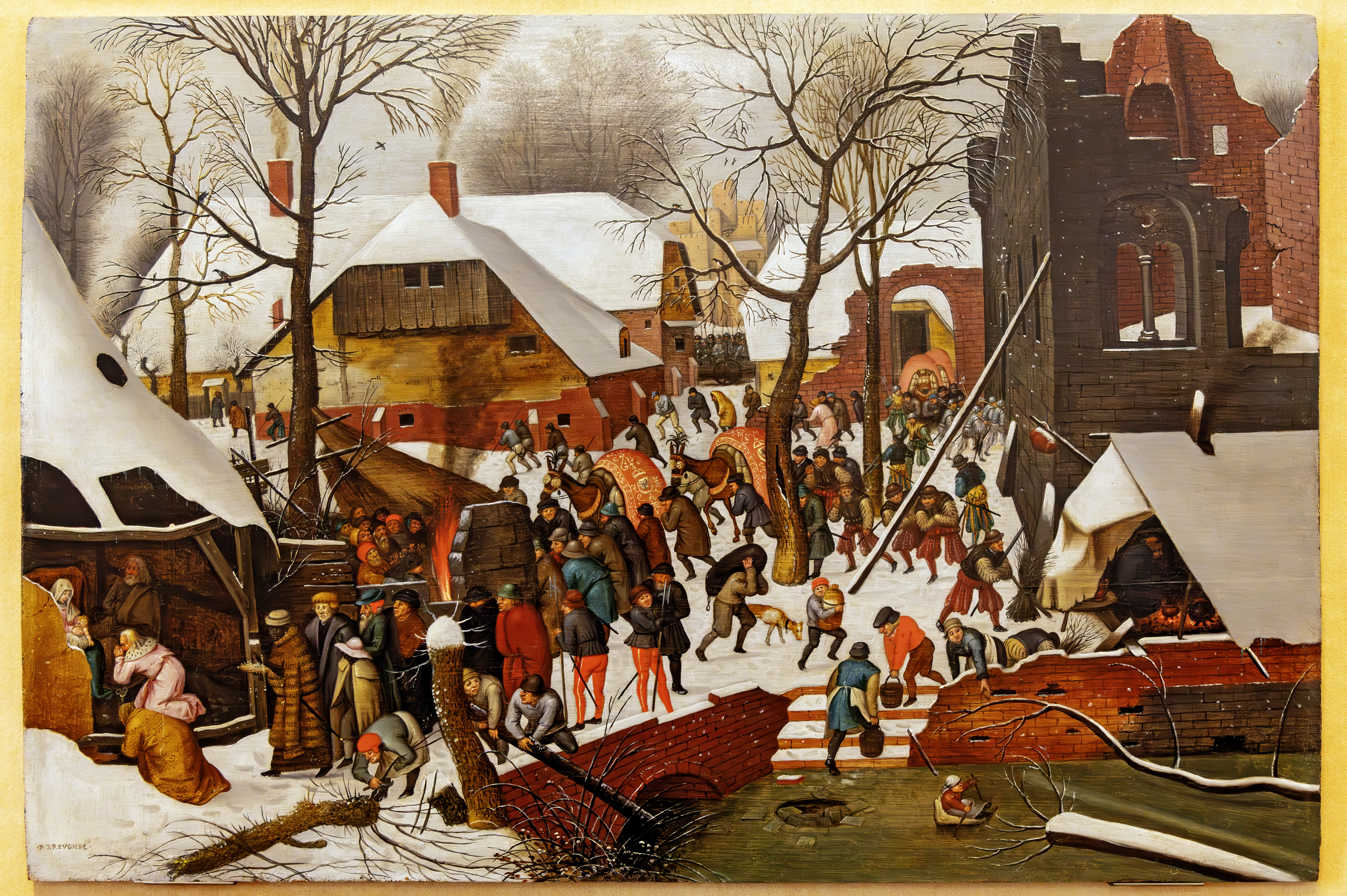
Copy by Pieter Brueghel the Younger, Museo Correr, Venice

At 35 cm × 55 cm (14 in × 22 in) it is considerably smaller than most of Bruegel's other examples of "the crowded, high-angle, small-figure compositions of his middle years", mostly with crowds of figures in a village setting. These are mostly over three times higher, at between 110 and 120 cm high. Like many of Bruegel's paintings, it is signed and dated, but the date, in Roman numerals in the bottom left corner, is hard to read, though 1563 is now generally accepted.

== Description ==
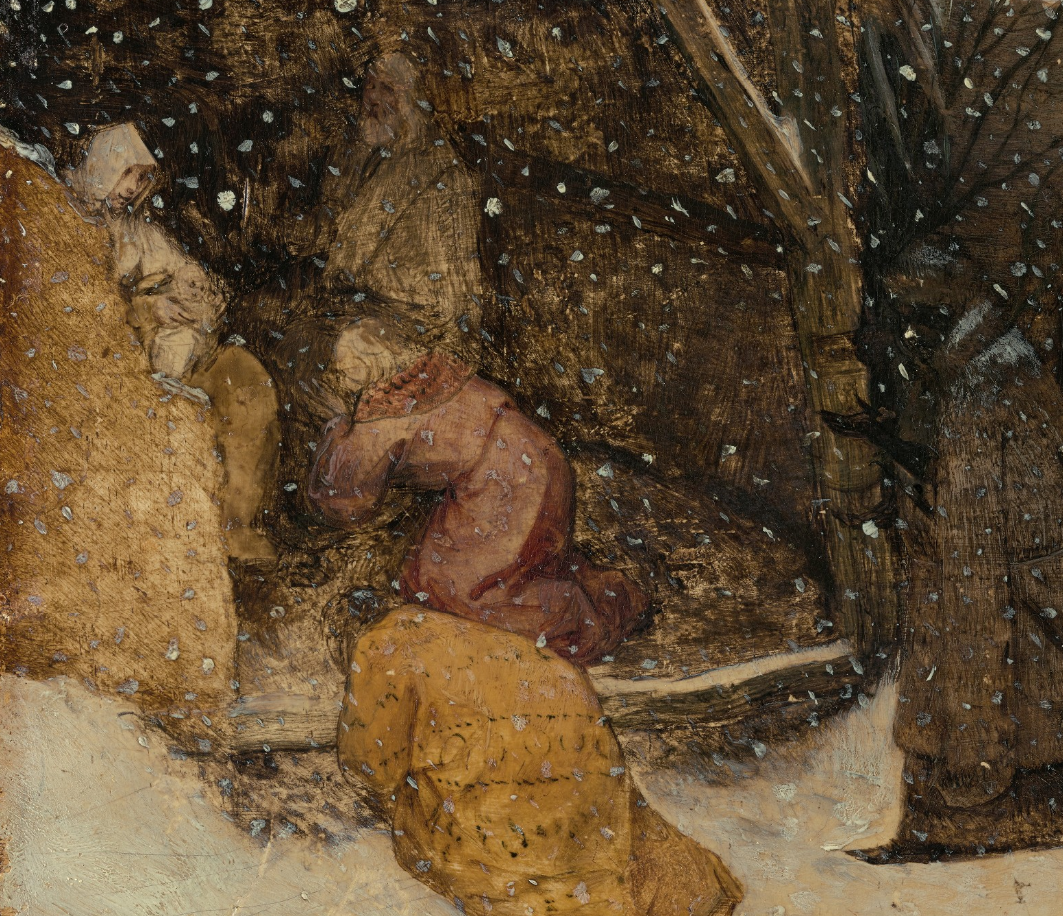
Detail of the stable, with Mary, Jesus and Joseph. Two Magi kneel, while the young black one stands at right.

The gloom and snow, together with the small scale and muted colours, mean the scene in the stable "can just be made out" in its "unexpected spot" in the bottom left corner. The diagonal arrangement of the many figures crowding the village street "tends to lead the eye away from the main event". This displacement of the main scene away from the centre is typical of Bruegel's works, seen for example in his earlier Landscape with the Fall of Icarus, and later The Census at Bethlehem.

There is the usual baggage train of the Magi, but only mules seem to be used, and all the figures are very well wrapped-up against the weather, stressing "the anonymity of everyone present, their utterly impersonal assimilation into the divine scheme". It is hard to distinguish the visitors from the villagers, and perhaps soldiers from the castle.

In the frozen piece of water across the road from the stable, a hole has been made for getting water, probably by the two men on the bridge grappling with a log. Two other men are now carrying water up the steps in buckets. Behind them, a toddler is cheerfully propelling himself across the ice, sitting in some improvised "kind of sledge" and using sticks like oars. The child is unaware he is heading straight towards the hole in the ice, but his mother on the raised bank above has just noticed this, and is springing into action. Two children play on similar equipment in The Census at Bethlehem.

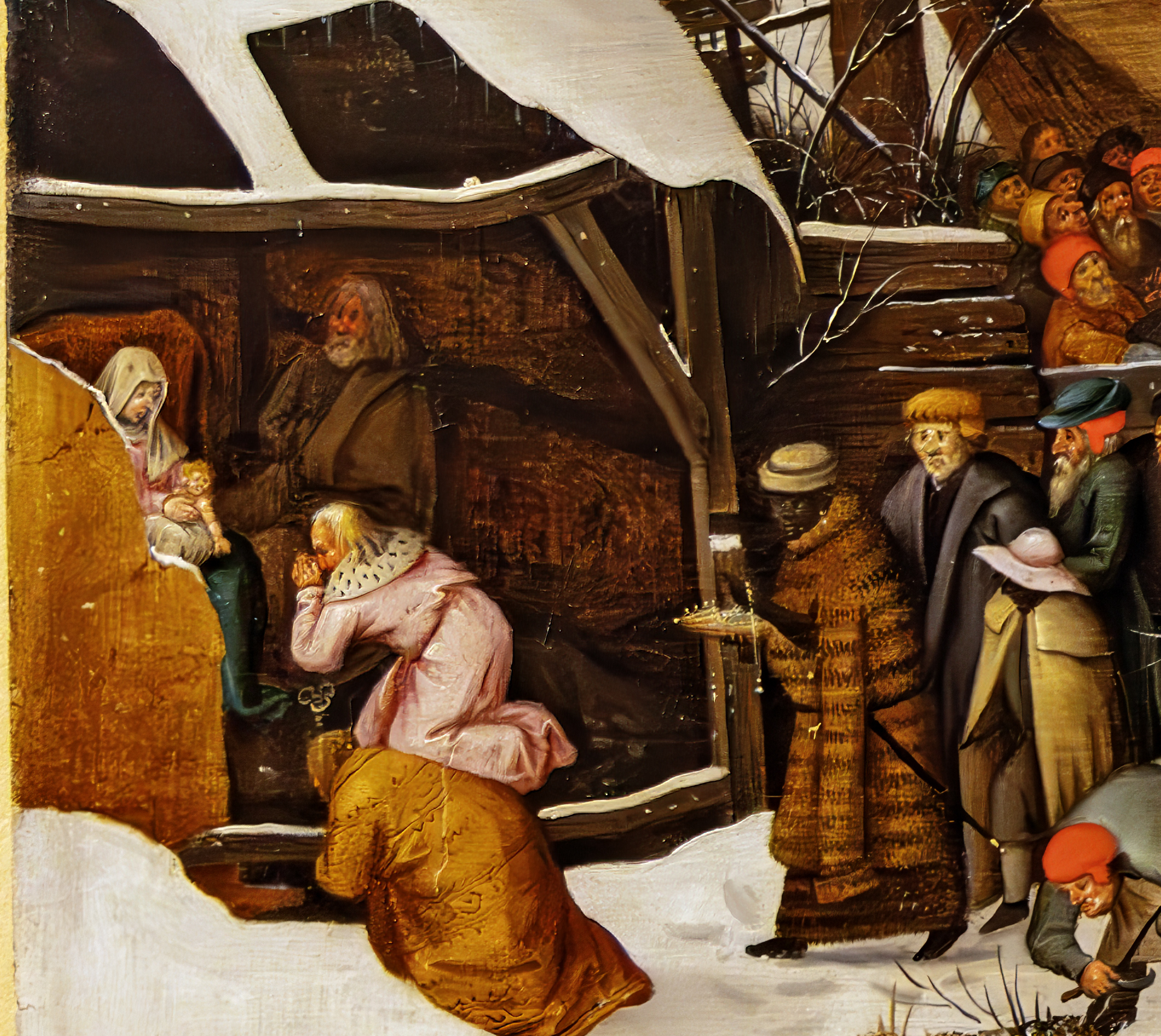
The stable group in the Museo Correr copy

To the right of the picture, the street is dominated by the ruin of a Romanesque palace, propped up by a large beam, and at the centre rear a castle can dimly be made out; this is much clearer in several copies. Bruegel's winter skies, showing a variety of atmospheric conditions, have been praised by critics and meteorologists alike. Here, the sky is "a featureless veil of nimbostratus".

== Re-dating ==
The date inscribed on the painting was mostly thought to be 1567, written in Roman numerals as "MDLXVII", but is now, after careful re-examination and technical examination before the 2019 Vienna exhibition, thought to be 1563, written in Roman numerals as "MDLXIII". This has the effect of making the painting Bruegel's earliest snow scene, rather than perhaps his last. In the years between the two dates Bruegel painted a number of landscapes under snow: The Hunters in the Snow (1565), Winter Landscape with Ice skaters and Bird trap (1565), Massacre of the Innocents (c.1565–1567), and The Census at Bethlehem (1566).

The painting is now dated before other events that had previously been discussed by some art historians as influences on it. Firstly, "the first landmark winter of the Grindelwald Fluctuation in 1564/65", which is often regarded as the first sign of the most intense phase of the Little Ice Age, and secondly the Beeldenstorm of the summer of 1566, marking the Protestant Reformation taking a violent turn.

=== Bruegel's other snow paintings ===
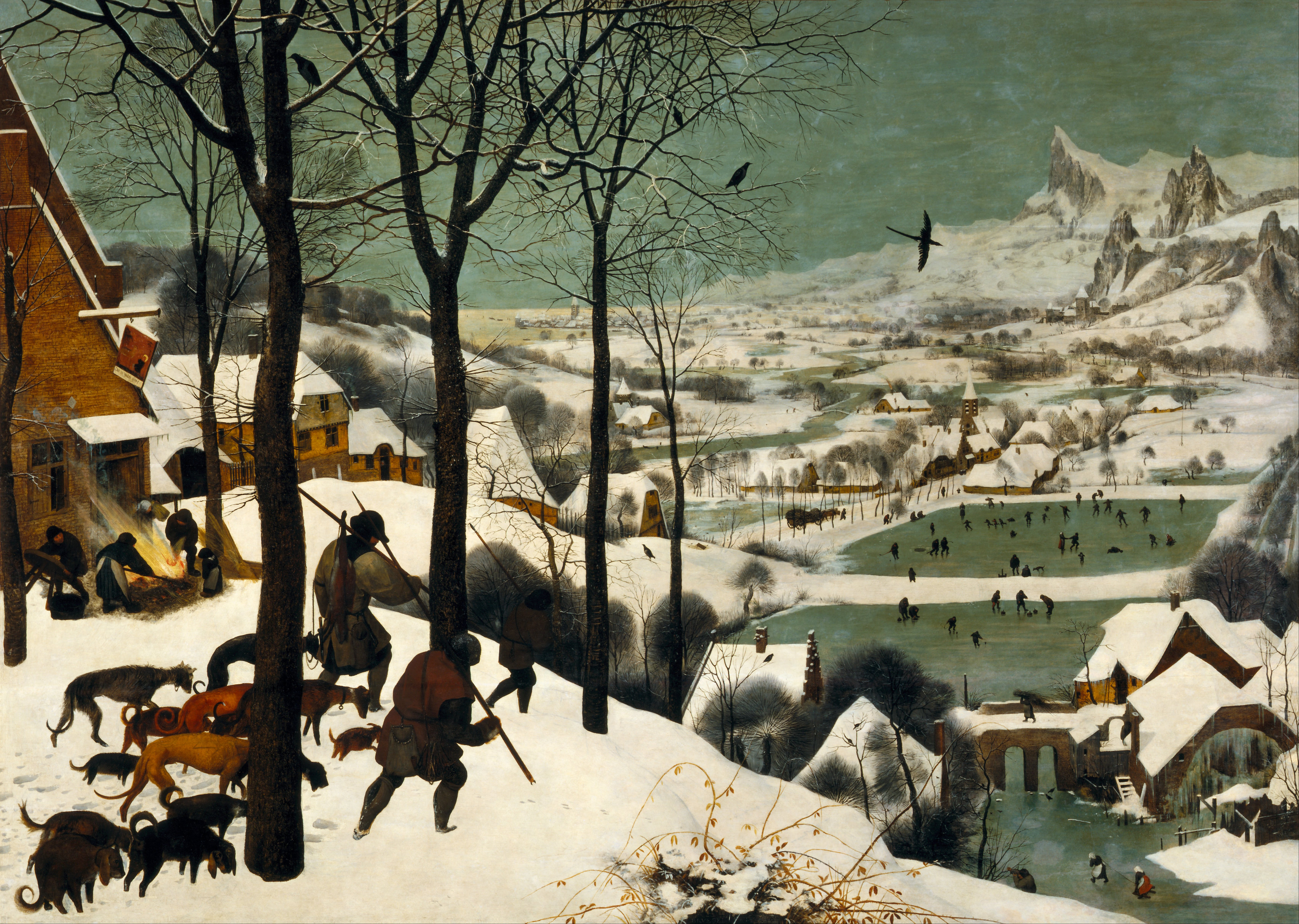
The Hunters in the Snow (1565)

Winter Landscape with a Bird Trap (1565)

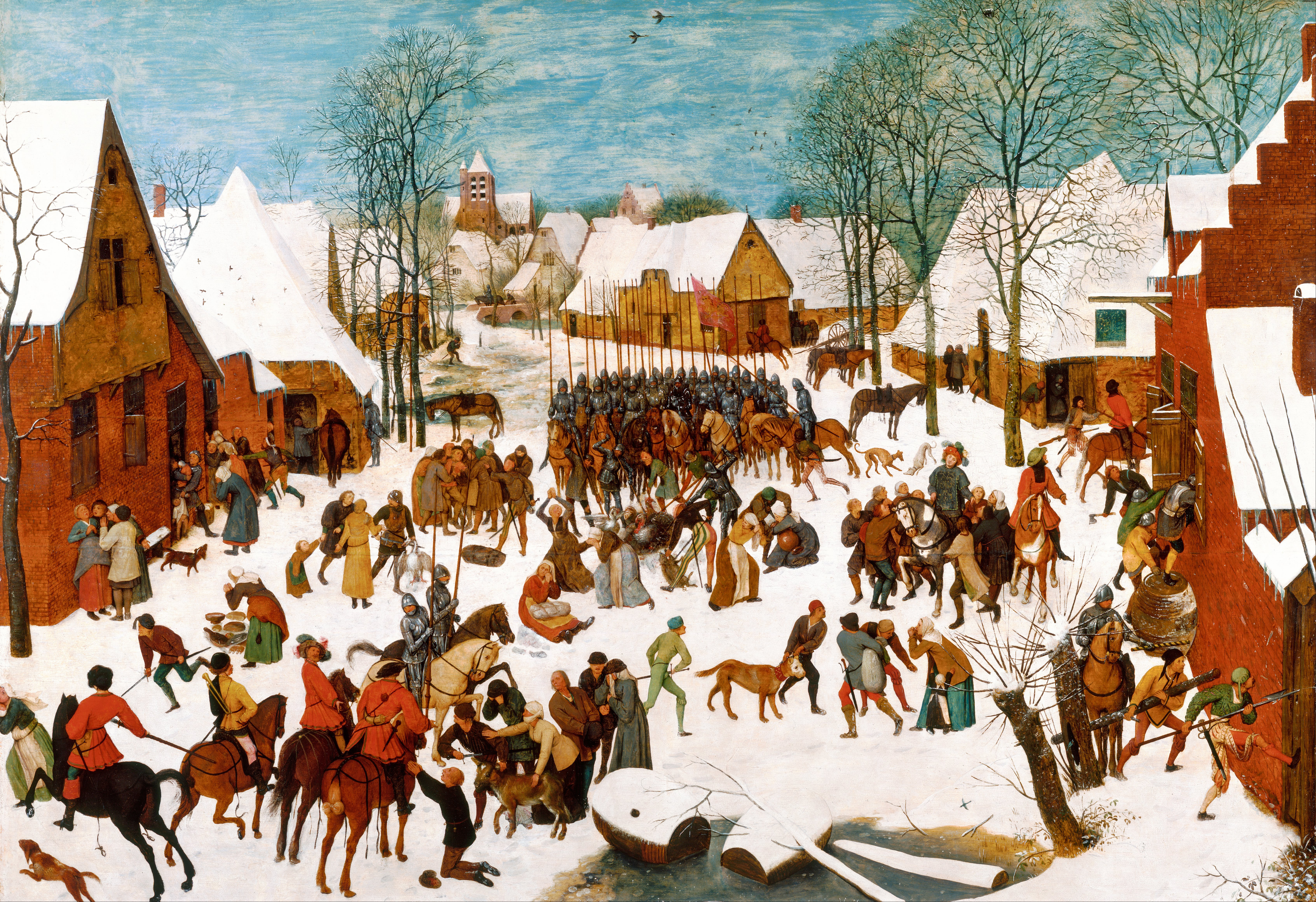
Massacre of the Innocents (c.1565–1567)

The Census at Bethlehem (1566)

== Provenance ==
The painting, or a drawing for or of it, was evidently available in the Brueghel family workshop, and there are an unusually large number of early copies by the Brueghel circle. The RKD records 36, with "about 25" by Pieter Brueghel the Younger; only the Winter Landscape with a Bird Trap has more, at about 127. This is a similar size, with smaller figures spread across a snowy landscape. The original is first recorded in the important collection of the German-born banker Everhard Jabach in Paris in 1696, the year after his death; most of his collection had been sold to Louis XIV and is now in the Louvre.

Nothing is then known until it was owned by Graf Johann Moritz Saurma, of the grand Silesian magnate family, by the early 20th century, before passing through the hands of the Berlin art dealer Paul Cassirer to be bought by the Swiss collector Oskar Reinhart in 1930.

The painting was extensively studied by modern methods in preparation for the major exhibition "Bruegel: Die Hand des Meisters" at the Kunsthistorisches Museum, Vienna, Austria, from 2 October 2018 to 13 January 2019, marking the 450th anniversary of Bruegel's death in 1569, where it was exhibited (as #65). This was followed by a smaller exhibition back at Winterthur (November 2019 to March 2020), centred on the painting. Both had extensive printed catalogues (see below).

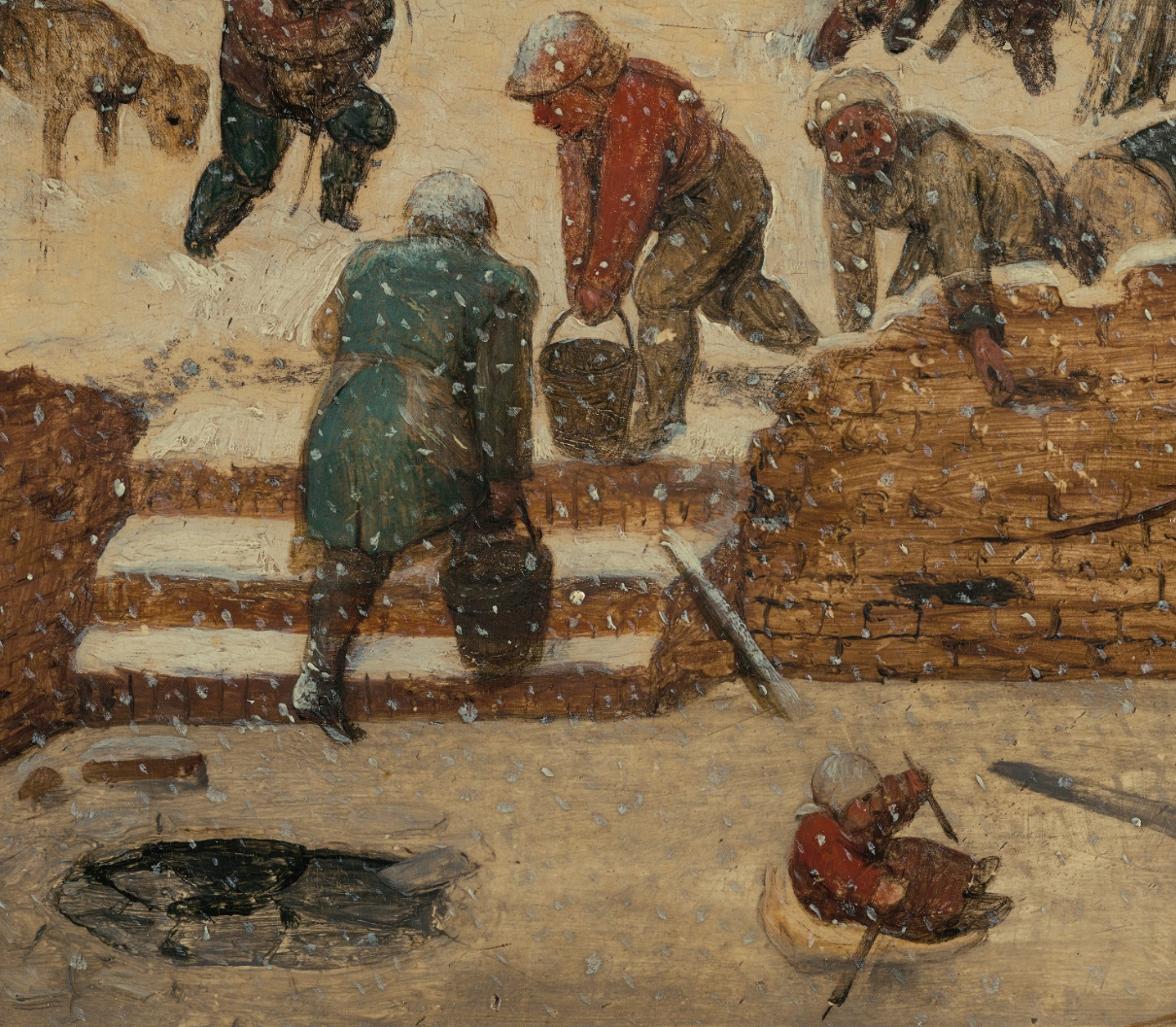
The scene on the frozen water

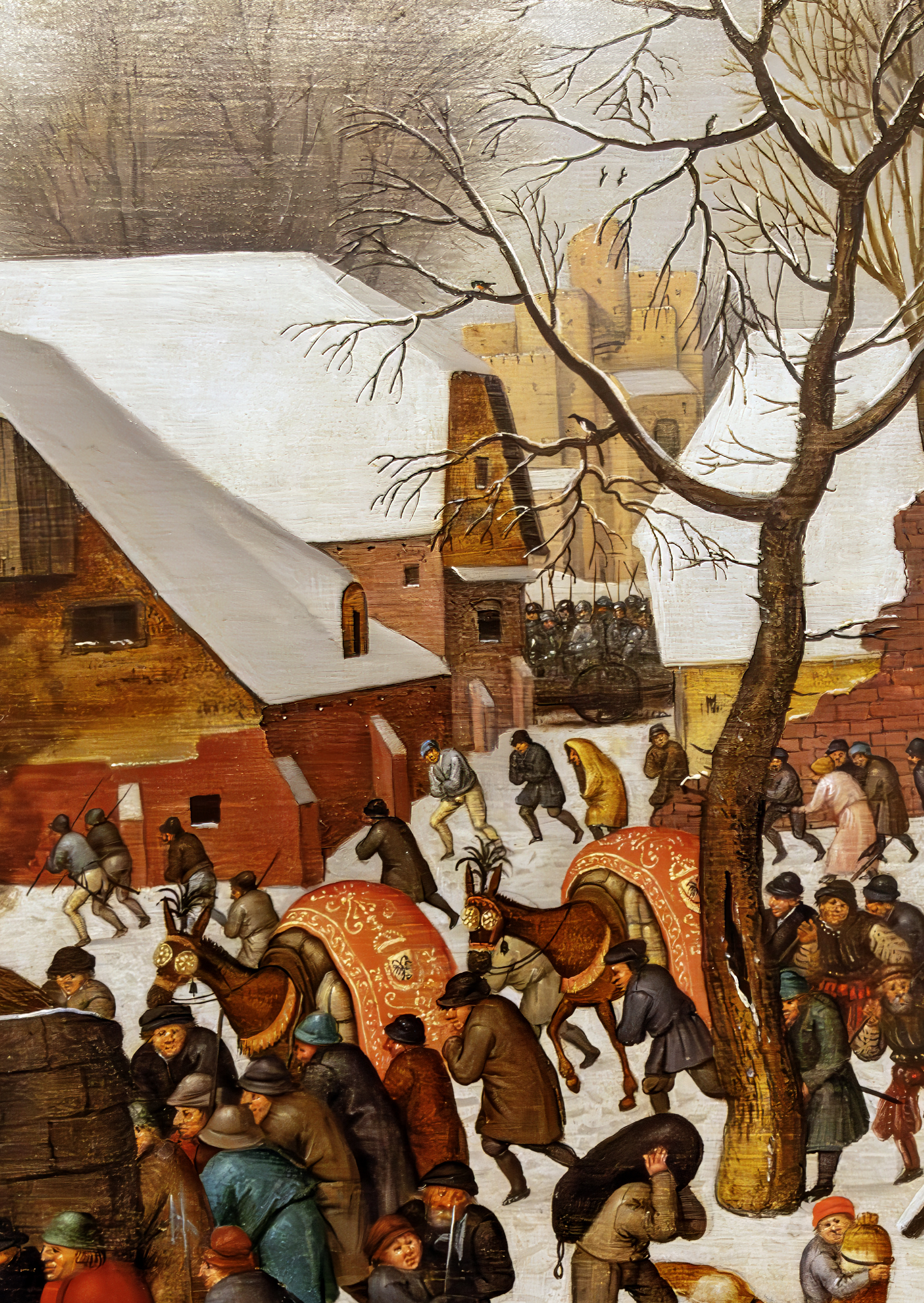
Two of the mules, with the castle behind, Museo Correr copy

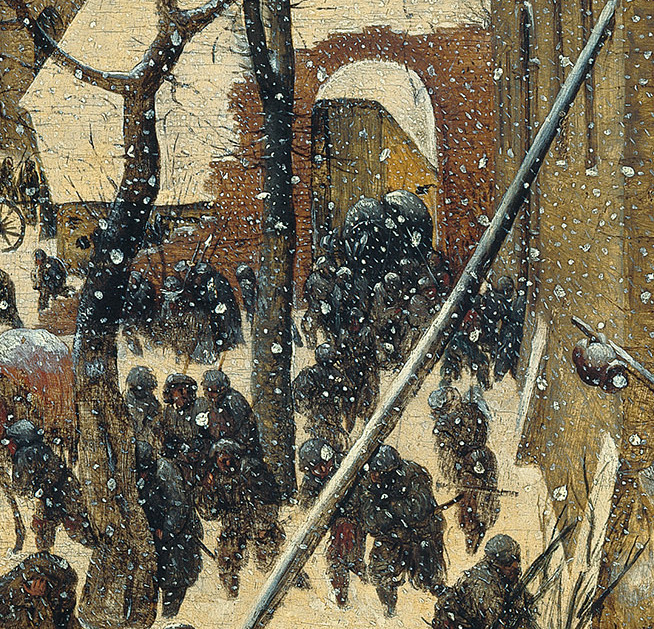
The rear of the Magi's caravan

== See also ==
- List of paintings by Pieter Bruegel the Elder
