= Procession to Calvary =

Procession to Calvary may refer to:

- Christ Carrying the Cross, an episode of the life of Jesus in the Gospels and an artistic subject;
- The Procession to Calvary, a painting by Pieter Bruegel the Elder (1564);
- The Procession to Calvary, a video game released in 2020.
