= Nicolaes Jonghelinck =

Art collector from Antwerp (1517–1570)

- Born: 1517; Antwerp, Belgium
- Died: 1570
- Occupation(s): Merchant banker, art collector
- Known for: Pieter Bruegel the Elder and Frans Floris

Nicolaes Jonghelinck (1517–1570) was a merchant banker and art collector from Antwerp. He is best known for his collection of paintings by Pieter Bruegel the Elder and Frans Floris. His brother was the sculptor Jacques Jonghelinck.

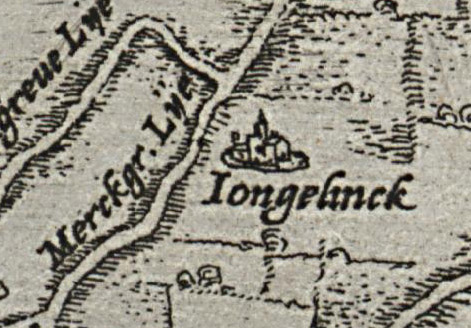
Iongelinck. Fortification listed on map of Antwerp dated 1582

In the archives of Antwerp, a writ of guarantee by Jonghelinck, dated 15 February 1566 and declaring to be worth 16.000 guilders for his friend Daniel de Bruyne lists "sixteen paintings by Bruegel, among them the Tower of Babel, a painting with the title Christ carrying the Cross, the twelve Months of the Year, and all the others whichever they might be". Jonghelinck probably commissioned these paintings for his fortified country house outside of Antwerp that was designed by his brother Jacques in 1547 and sold in 1554 to Nicolaes. It can still be seen on a map dated 1582, although it was destroyed during the fall of Antwerp.

== Months of the Year ==
Though it is known that Jonghelinck owned 16 paintings by Bruegel at the time of his death, the specific list is unknown and for many years art historians assumed that this cycle of paintings included either four panels for the four seasons or twelve panels for all twelve months. Now it is assumed they represent six bi-monthly pairs, with one missing. They are assumed to be a continuation of an older tradition to make cyclical images of the Labours of the Months, but they were hung by Jonghelinck in his chateau and therefore may simply have been ordered as wall decorations. The surviving Months of the Year cycle are:

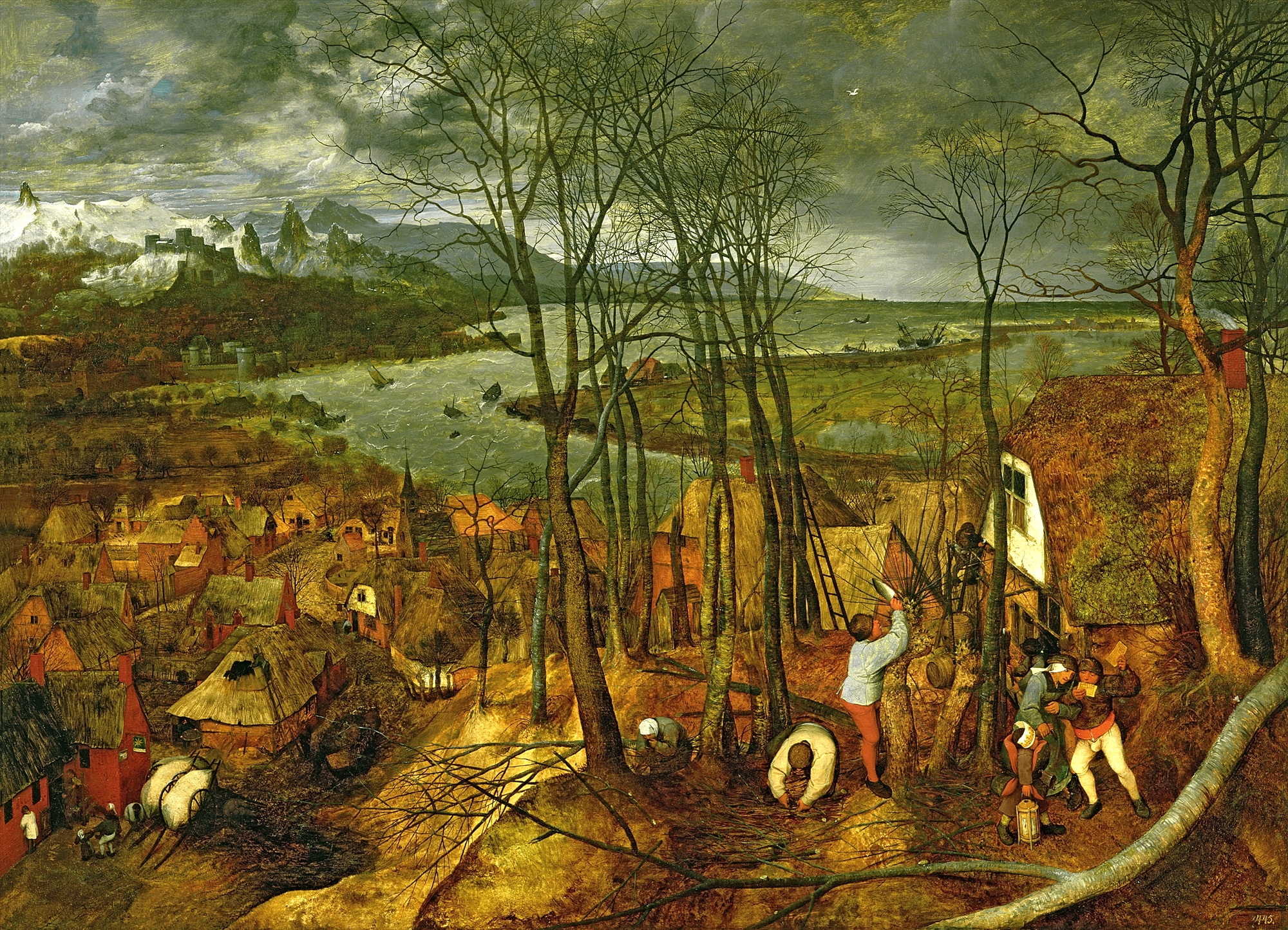
The Gloomy Day (February/March)

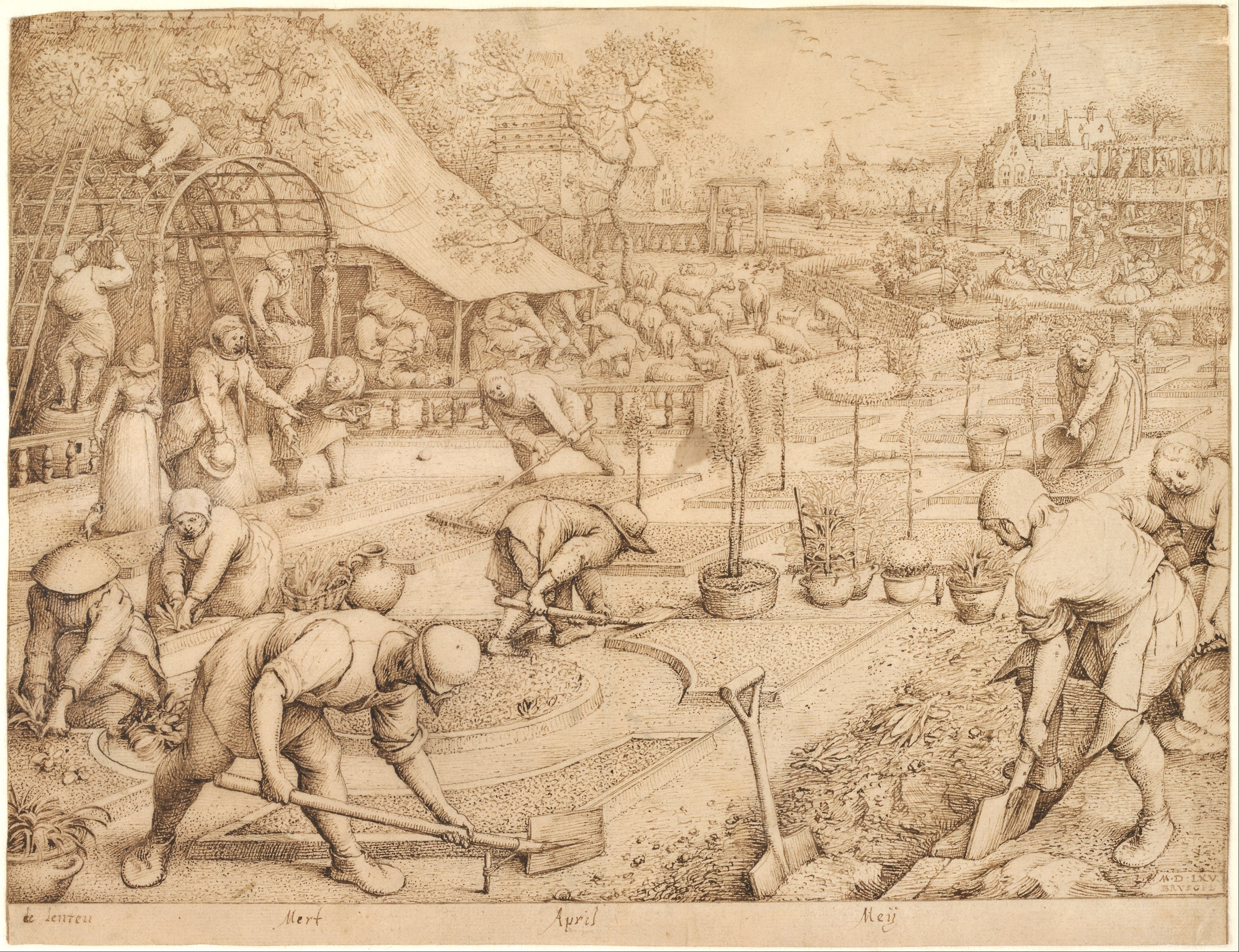
A 1565 Bruegel sketch "Spring" although not part of the Months cycle series it could very well be similar to what Bruegel had in mind when he painted "High Spring" {April/May)

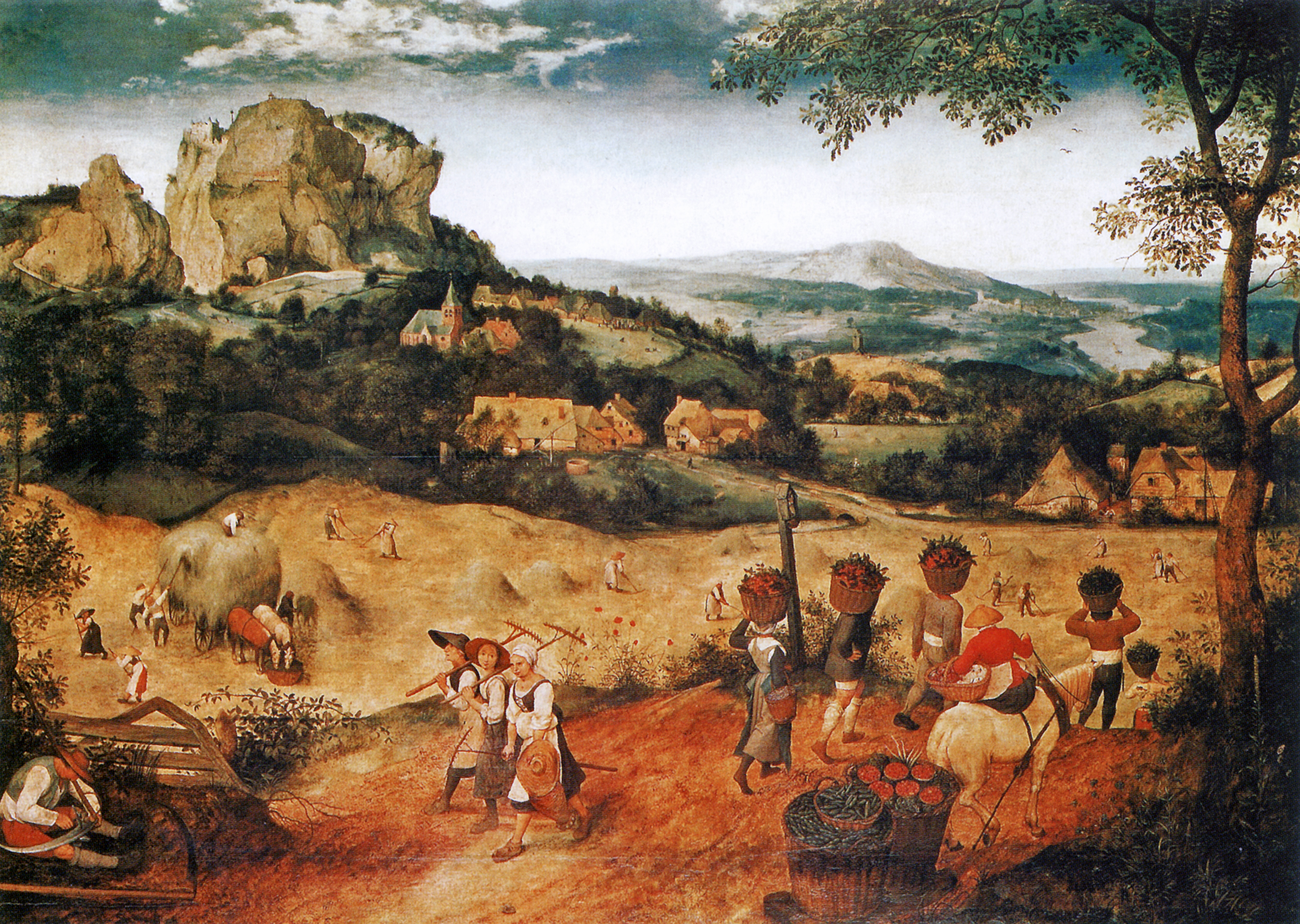
The Hay Harvest (June/July)

The Harvesters (August/September)

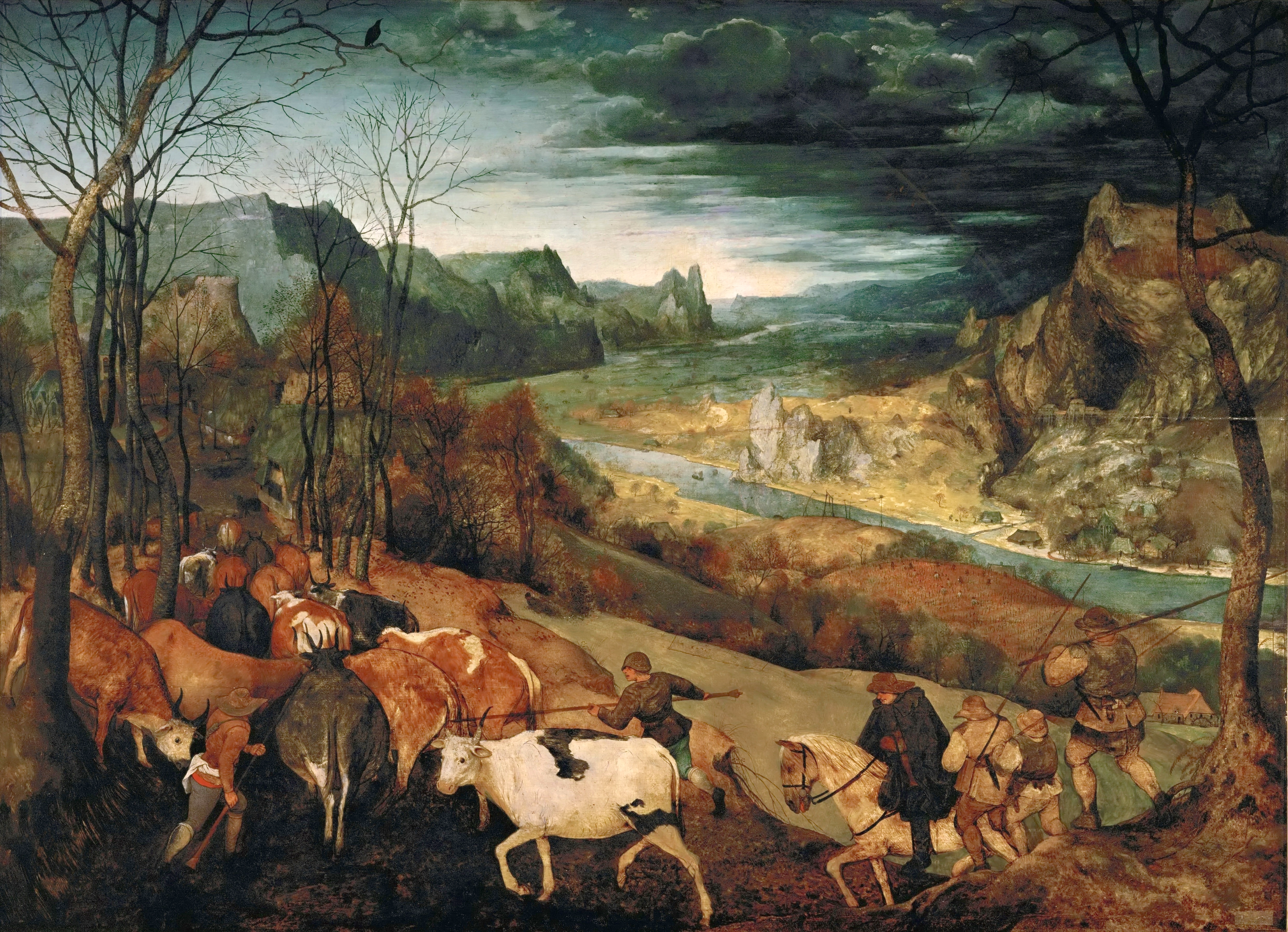
The Return of the Herd (October/November)

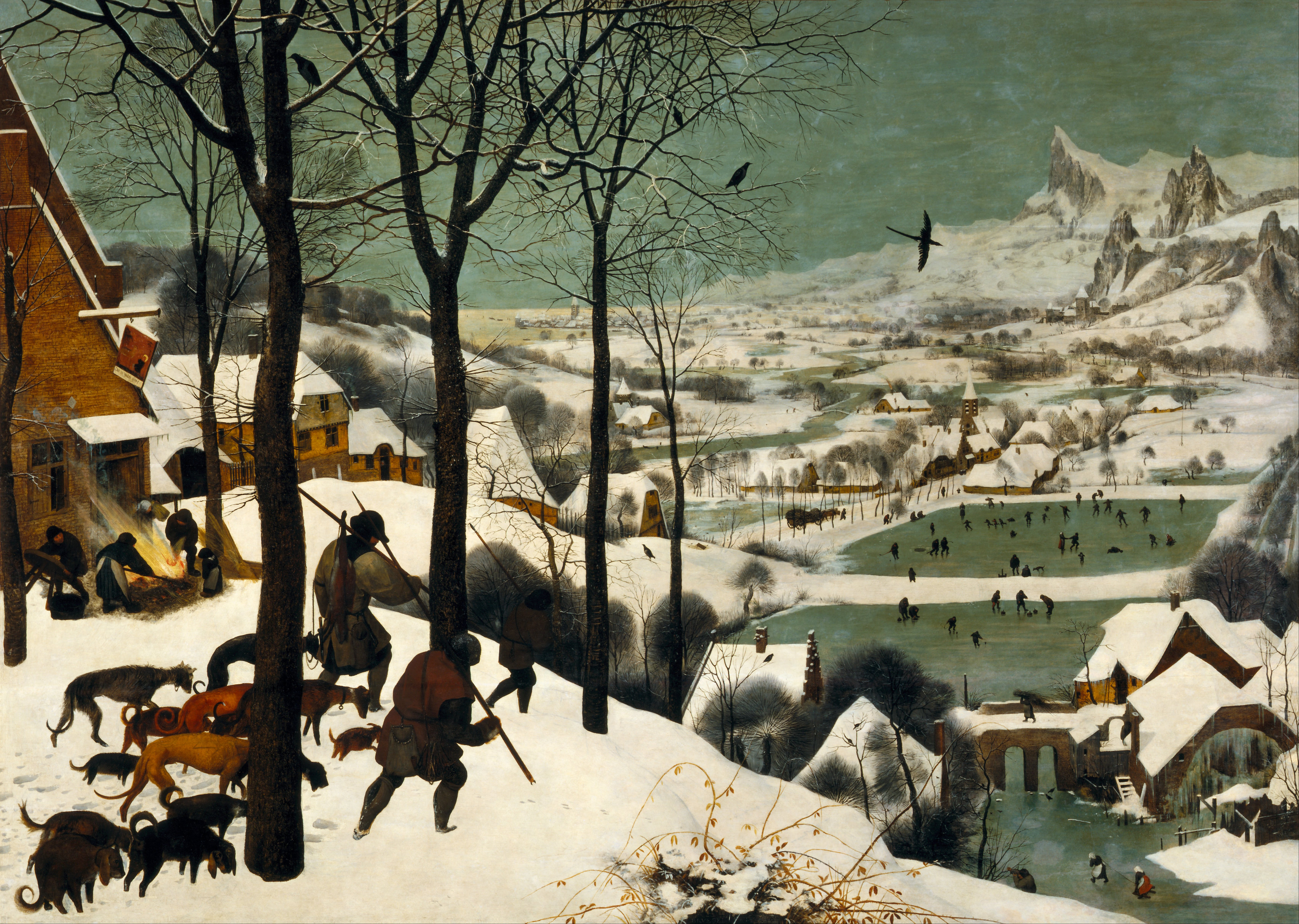
The Hunters in the Snow (December/January)

== The Tower of Babel ==
Tower of Babel

Bruegel's Tower of Babel is one of several paintings in the possession of Jonghelinck that came into the collection of the City of Antwerp and later found their way into the Austrian Imperial collection of Vienna through Archduke Leopold Wilhelm of Austria. A smaller version by Breugel's hand is in Rotterdam, dated to the same period, which indicates the popularity of the subject in Jonghelinck's day.

== The Procession to Calvary ==
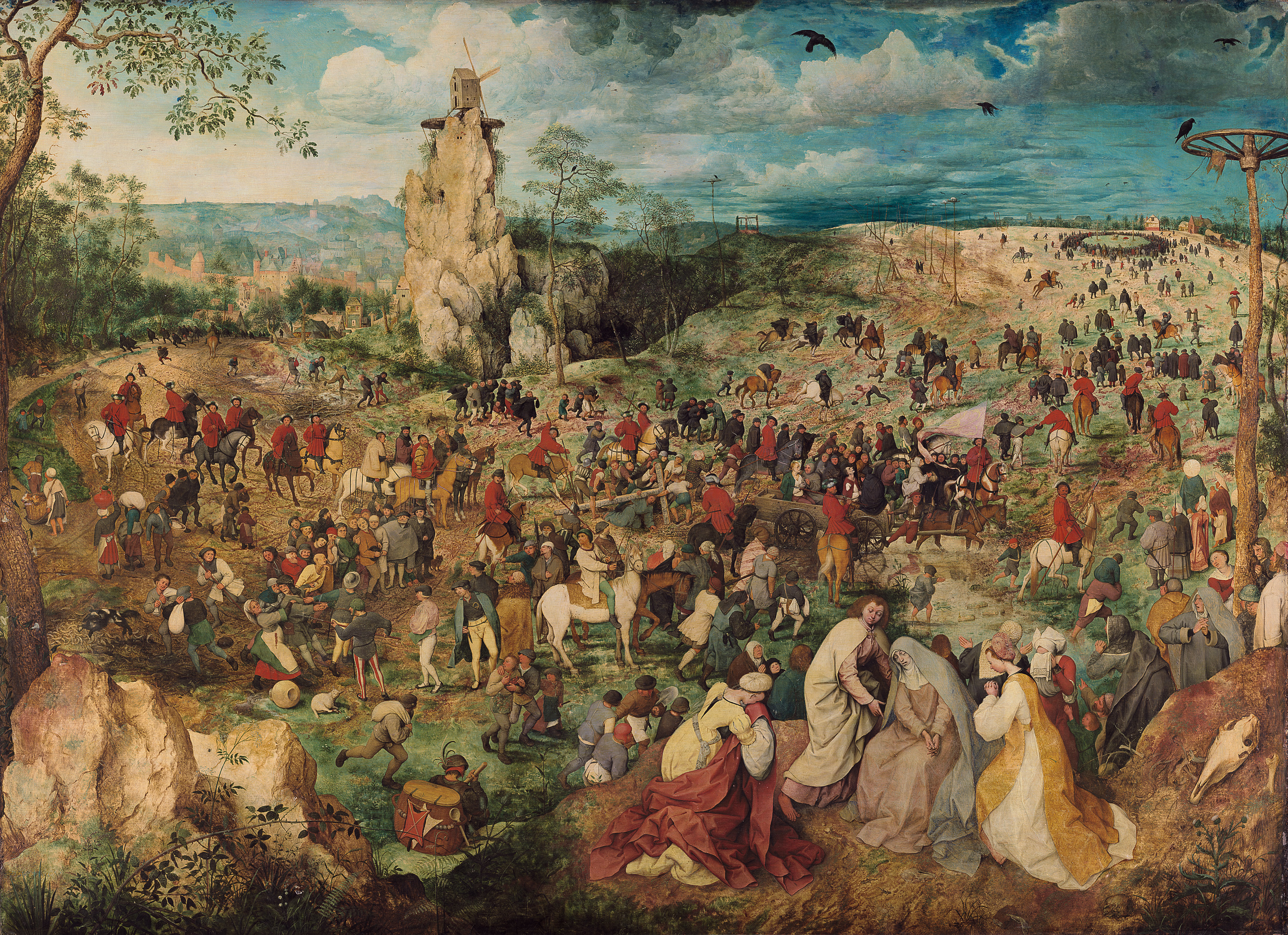
The Procession to Calvary

Michael Francis Gibson wrote an art history book entitled The Mill and the Cross, which served as the basis for the 2011 film The Mill and the Cross, directed by Lech Majewski. The film puts the characters in the painting and the circumstances of the painting's creation into their historical context in sixteenth-century Flanders. It stars Rutger Hauer as Bruegel and Michael York as his patron Jonghelinck.

== Labours of Hercules ==
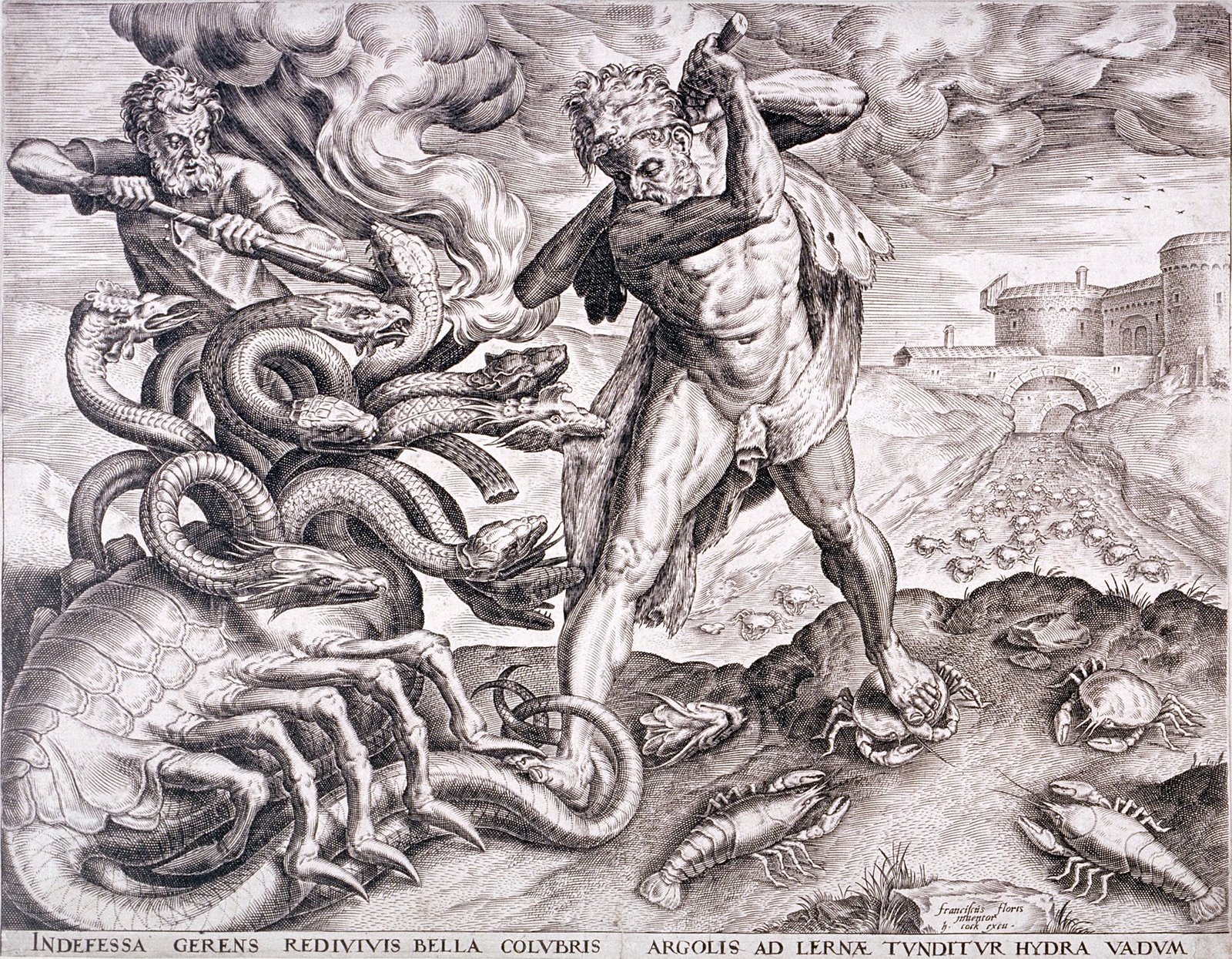
Hercules Killing the Lernaean Hydra

Another artist in Jonghelinck's collection was Frans Floris, who made ten panels of the Labours of Hercules (which are now lost and only known through later engravings). Floris also made seven compositions on the liberal arts for Jonghelinck, which were later exported to Genoa.

== Provenance ==
Nicolaas Jonghelinck is listed as the first owner in 1566 (referring to the writ of guarantee above) for several of the paintings that have survived in the Austrian Imperial collection and are still in the Kunsthistorisches Museum today. For example, the record for The Gloomy Day, or Düsterer Tag (Vorfrühling), shows in its provenance record Nicolaas Jongelinck; 1594 Geschenk der Stadt Antwerpen an Erzherzog Ernst; 1595 Nachlass Erzherzog Ernst; Rudolf II.; Slg. Leopold Wilhelm.
