= Lêdo Ivo =

Brazilian writer

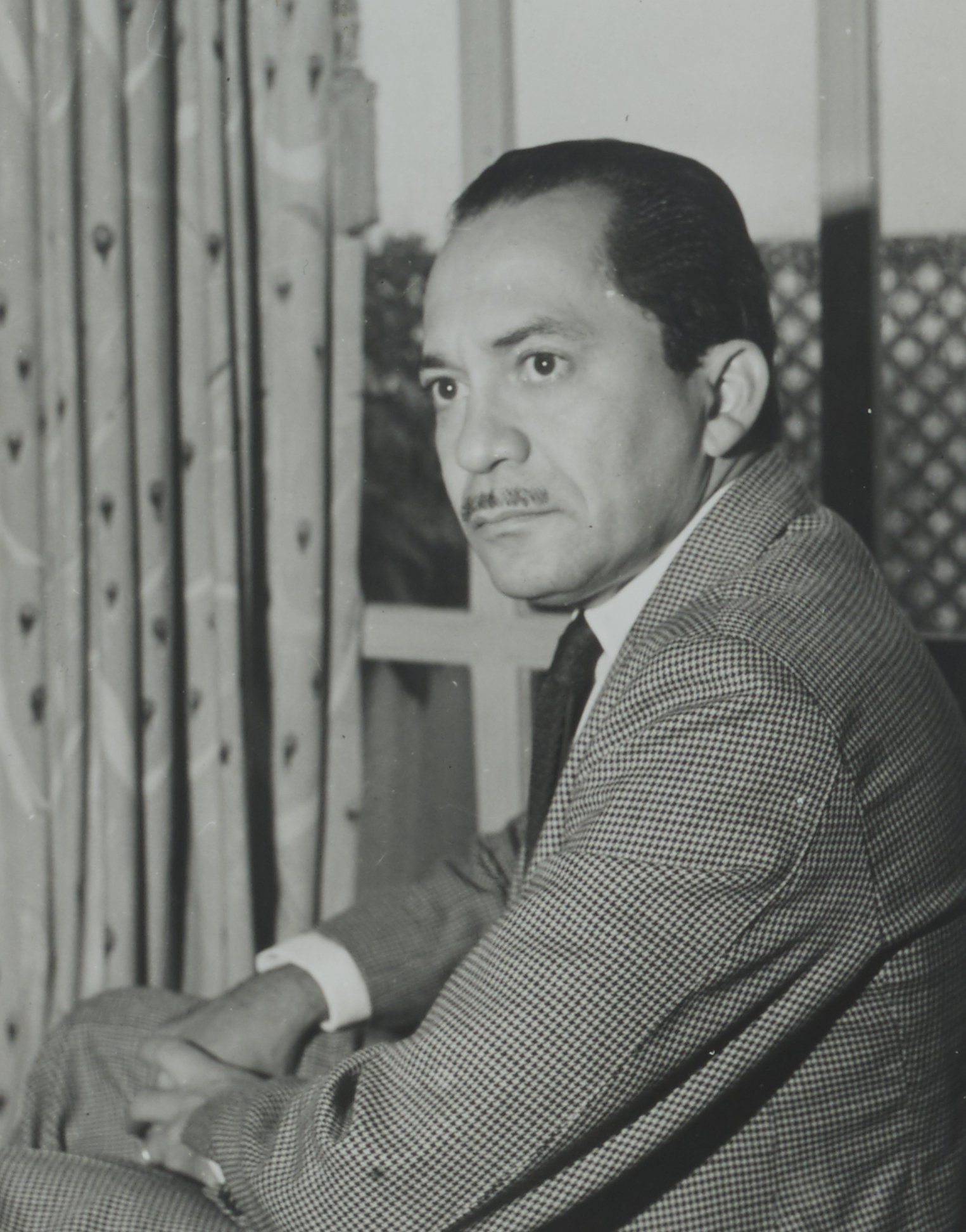
- From the collection of the Brazilian National Archives
- Born: 18 February 1924; Maceió, Alagoas, Brazil
- Died: 23 December 2012 (aged 88); Seville, Spain
- Occupations: Poet novelist essayist journalist

Lêdo Ivo (18 February 1924 – 23 December 2012) was a Brazilian poet, novelist, essayist and journalist. He was member of the Brazilian Academy of Letters, elected in 1986.

== Biography ==
Lêdo Ivo was born in 1924 in Maceió, capital of Alagoas state in northeastern Brazil. He settled in 1940 in Recife, where he completed his training. In 1943, he moved to Rio de Janeiro to enroll in law school, while also working for the literary supplements as a professional journalist. He married Leda Maria Sarmento Ivo de Medeiros (1923-2004), with whom he had three children.

His first book was published in 1944, a collection of poems titled As imaginações. The following year he published Ode e Elegia, which was awarded the Olavo Bilac Prize of the Brazilian Academy of Letters and is a turning point in the history of Brazilian poetry. The death of Mário de Andrade in 1945 led to a generational change in Brazilian poetry whose rule was "an invitation to transgression", with the triumph of purely poetical structures. His literary work would be enhanced in the following decades by books of poetry, novels, short stories and essays or reports. Ivo's first novel, As Alianças, went through several editions and was awarded the Graça Aranha Foundation Prize in 1947. He continued with O Caminho sem Adventura (1948), O sobrinho do General (1964) and Ninho de cobras (published in English as Snake's Nest) (1973), one of his biggest successes, an allegory of totalitarianism of the military dictatorship of Getúlio Vargas. His last novel was A morte do Brasil (1984).

In 1949 Ivo spoke at the Museum of Modern Art of São Paulo in a conference titled The Generation of 1945; in the same year he received a degree in law, a profession he would never exercise, preferring to devote himself to journalism. In 1953 he visited several European countries for long periods. In 1963 he spent two months in universities in the USA, by invitation of the Government. In 1986 Ivo was elected to the Brazilian Academy of Letters. In 2009 he was awarded the Premio Casa de Las Américas.

Ledo Ivo was also a translator. He translated into Portuguese works of authors like Albrecht Goes, Jane Austen, Maupassant, Rimbaud and Dostoyevsky.

He published two memoirs, Confissões de um Poeta (1979), which was awarded the prize of the Cultural Foundation of the Federal District, and O Aluno Relapso (1991).

== Works ==
=== Poetry ===
- As imaginações. Rio de Janeiro: Pongetti, 1944.4
- Ode e elegia. Rio de Janeiro: Pongetti, 1945.
- Acontecimento do soneto. Barcelona: O Livro Inconsútil, 1948.
- Ode ao crepúsculo. Rio de Janeiro: Pongetti, 1948.
- Cântico. Illustrations by Emeric Marcier. Rio de Janeiro: J. Olympio, 1949.
- Linguagem: (1949-19041). Rio de Janeiro, J. Olympio, 1951.
- Ode equatorial. With etchings by Anísio Medeiros. Niterói: Hipocampo, 1951.
- Acontecimento do soneto. Introduction by Campos de Figueiredo. Rio de Janeiro: Orfeu, 1951.
- Um brasileiro em Paris e O rei da Europa. Rio de Janeiro: J. Olympio, 1955.
- Magias. Rio de Janeiro: Agir, 1960.
- Uma lira dos vinte anos. Rio de Janeiro: Liv. São José, 1962.
- Estação central. Rio de Janeiro: Tempo Brasileiro, 1964.
- Rio, a cidade e os dias: crônicas e histórias. Rio de Janeiro: Tempo Brasileiro, 1965.
- Finisterra. Rio de Janeiro: J. Olympio, 1972.
- O sinal semafórico. Rio de Janeiro: J. Olympio, 1974.
- O soldado raso. Recife: Edições Pirata, 1980.
- A noite misteriosa. Rio de Janeiro: Record, 1982.
- Calabar. Rio de Janeiro: Record, 1985.
- Mar Oceano. Rio de Janeiro: Record, 1987.
- Crepúsculo civil. Rio de Janeiro: Topbooks, 1990.
- Curral de peixe. Rio de Janeiro: Topbooks, 1995.
- Noturno romano. With etchings by João Athanasio. Teresópolis: Impressões do Brasil, 1997.
- O rumor da noite. Rio de Janeiro: Nova Fronteira, 2000.
- Plenilúnio. Rio de Janeiro: Topbooks, 2004.
- Réquiem. Rio de Janeiro: A Contra Capa, 2008.
- Poesia Completa (1940-2004). Rio de Janeiro: Topbooks, 2004.
- Réquiem. With paintings by Gonçalo Ivo and design by Gianguido Bonfanti. Rio de Janeiro: Contra Capa, 2008.
- Mormaço. With paintings by Steven Alexander. Rio de Janeiro: Contra Capa, 2013.

=== Novels ===
- As alianças (Premio Fundação Graça Aranha). Rio de Janeiro: Agir, 1947.
- O caminho sem aventura. São Paulo: Instituto Progresso Editorial, 1948.
- O sobrinho do general. Rio de Janeiro: Civilização Brasileira, 1964.
- Ninho de cobras (V Premio Walmap). Rio de Janeiro: J. Olympio, 1973.
- A morte do Brasil. Rio de Janeiro: Record, 1984.

=== Short stories ===
- Use a passagem subterrânea. São Paulo: Difusão Européia do Livro, 1961.
- O flautim. Rio de Janeiro: Bloch, 1966.
- 10 [dez] contos escolhidos. Brasilia: Horizonte, 1986.
- Os melhores contos de Lêdo Ivo. São Paulo: Global, 1995.
- Um domingo perdido. São Paulo: Global, 1998.
