= The Mill and the Cross =

2011 film

- Directed by: Lech Majewski
- Written by: Michael Francis Gibson; Lech Majewski
- Produced by: George Lekovic; Lech Majewski; Freddy Olsson; Dorota Roszkowska
- Starring: Rutger Hauer; Charlotte Rampling; Michael York
- Cinematography: Lech Majewski; Adam Sikora
- Edited by: Eliot Ems; Norbert Rudzik
- Music by: Lech Majewski; Józef Skrzek
- Production companies: Angelus Silesius; Telewizja Polska; Arkana Studio; Bokomotiv Filmproduktion
- Release dates: 23 January 2011 (Sundance); 18 March 2011 (Poland)
- Running time: 96 minutes
- Countries: Poland; Sweden
- Languages: English and Spanish
- Budget: €1.1 million

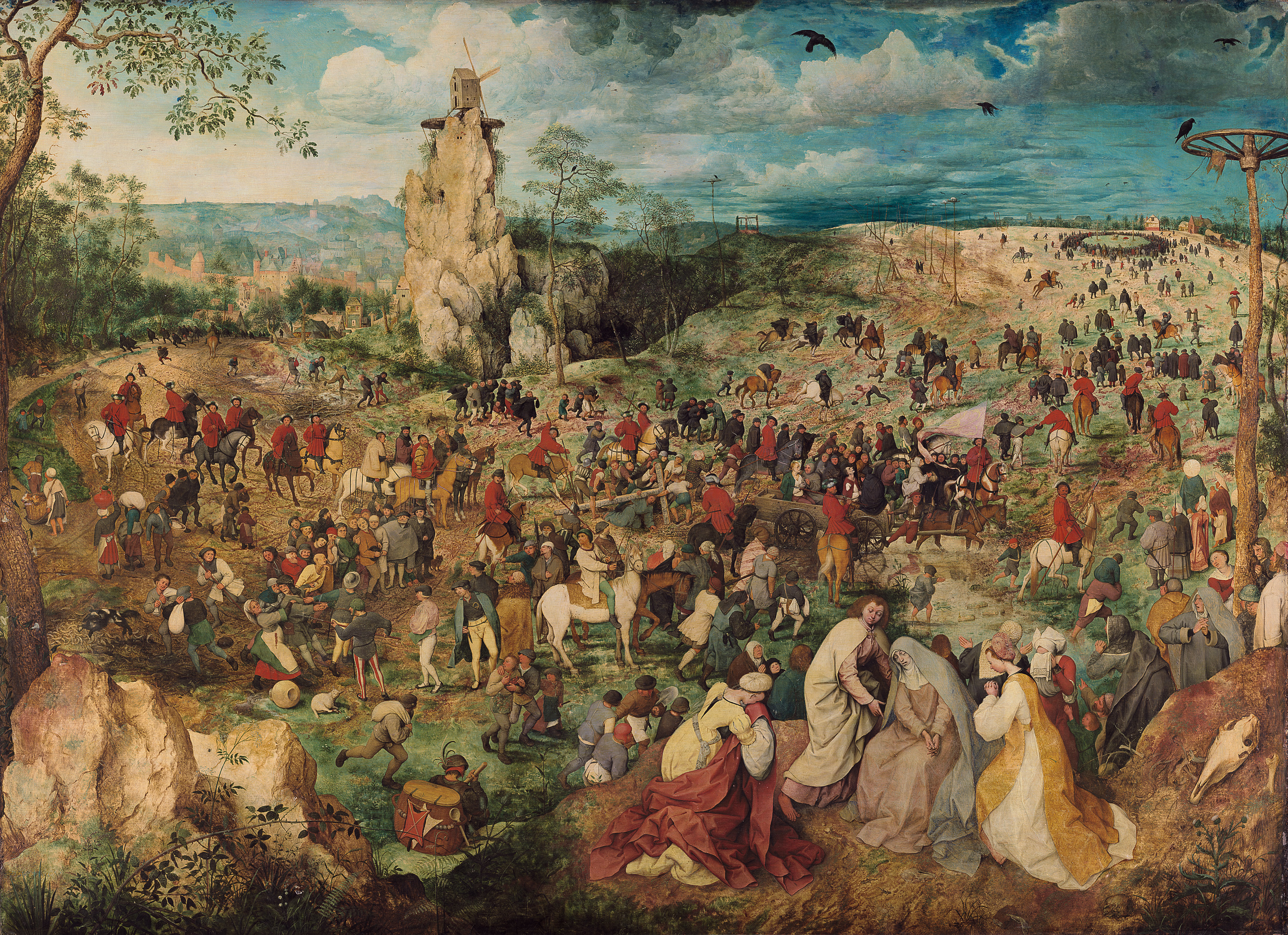
Pieter Bruegel's The Way to Calvary

The Mill and the Cross (Polish: Młyn i krzyż) is a 2011 drama film co-written, produced, shot, scored and directed by Lech Majewski and starring Rutger Hauer, Charlotte Rampling, and Michael York. It is inspired by Pieter Bruegel the Elder's 1564 painting The Procession to Calvary, and based on Michael Francis Gibson's 1996 book The Mill and the Cross. The film was a Polish-Swedish co-production. Filming on the project wrapped in August 2009. It premiered at the Sundance Film Festival on January 23, 2011.

== Plot ==
The film focuses on a dozen of the 500 characters depicted in Bruegel's painting. It consists of a series of vignettes depicting everyday peasant life, interspersed with monologues from some of the principal characters, including Bruegel explaining the structure and symbolism of his painting. The theme of Christ's suffering is set against religious persecution in Flanders in 1564.

== Cast ==
- Rutger Hauer as Pieter Bruegel
- Michael York as Nicolaes Jonghelinck
- Charlotte Rampling as Mary
- Joanna Litwin as Marijken Bruegel (Pieter's wife)
- Marian Makula as The Miller

== Production ==
In 1996 Michael Francis Gibson published a detailed analysis of Pieter Bruegel the Elder’s 124 x 170 cm, 500-character painting, The Way to Calvary (Kunsthistorisches Museum, Vienna) under the title Le Portement de croix de Pierre Bruegel l'Aîné (Noêsis, Paris). He translated the book into English and it was published under the title The Mill and the Cross in 2001 (Acatlos, Lausanne). The New York Times called it "as readable and riveting as a first-rate spy-thriller." In January 2011, Majewski’s undertook production of the feature-length The Mill and the Cross (having cast Charlotte Rampling, Michael York and Rutger Hauer). The film was designed to be a narrative recreation of Bruegel’s painting that (according to Gibson) evokes the sort of scene that Bruegel himself too often had occasion to witness: the execution of a Flemish Protestant by the militia of the King of Spain.

The film intended to combine old and new technologies allowing the viewer to live inside the painting—Flemish master Pieter Bruegel's 1564 "The Procession to Calvary," an epic canvas depicting both Christ's crucifixion and the artist's homeland brutalization by Spanish occupiers. Filming was completed in August 2009.

== Release ==
The film premiered at the Sundance Film Festival on January 23, 2011.

== Reception ==
As of June 2020, The Mill and the Cross holds a 79% approval rating on review aggregator Rotten Tomatoes, based on 42 reviews with an average rating of 7.41/10. Metacritic, which uses a weighted average, assigned a score of 80 out of 100, based on 17 critics, indicating "generally favorable reviews".

Roger Ebert from the Chicago Sun-Times gave the film 4 stars out of four and stated: "If you see no more than the opening shots, you will never forget them. It opens on a famous painting, and within the painting, a few figures move and walk. We will meet some of those people in more detail." Joe Bendel: "... one of the standouts at this year’s Sundance". Variety's Dennis Harvey wrote: "While hardly an exercise in strict realism a la The Girl With the Pearl Earring, the pic details rustic Flanders life with loving care, from costuming to simple machinery. Pic's narrative content ... is hardly straightforward or propulsive. ... the film is never dull, and frequently entrancing." Harvey thought that if marketed cleverly, the film "could prove the Polish helmer's belated international breakthrough". Neil Young of The Hollywood Reporter complimented the technical achievements, but called the film "ambitious but frustratingly flat". He described the English dialogue as "mostly clunky" and thought the film "has too much of a stodgy Euro-pudding feel". On the other hand, in his review for the San Francisco International Film Festival, executive director Graham Leggat wrote: "...the narrative is not the point—the extraordinary imagery is. The painting literally comes to life in this spellbinding film, its wondrous scenes entering the viewer like a dream enters a sleeping body."
