= The Procession to Calvary =

- Developer: Joe Richardson
- Publisher: Joe Richardson
- Designer: Joe Richardson
- Writer: Joe Richardson
- Platforms: Microsoft Windows, macOS, PlayStation 4, Nintendo Switch, Xbox One, Android
- Genre: Point-and-click adventure

The Procession to Calvary is a video game for Microsoft Windows, macOS, PlayStation 4, Nintendo Switch, Xbox One, and Android by Joe Richardson, released in 2020 and following on from his previous game Four Last Things. The game was released on Xbox Game Pass in October 2021.

The game is named for the painting The Procession to Calvary by Pieter Bruegel the Elder. Like its predecessor, the game's visuals are composed of elements from classic European paintings, mainly from the Middle Ages and Renaissance. The protagonist's appearance is that of the goddess Bellona painted by Rembrandt.
