= Conversion of Paul (Bruegel) =

Painting by Pieter Bruegel the Elder

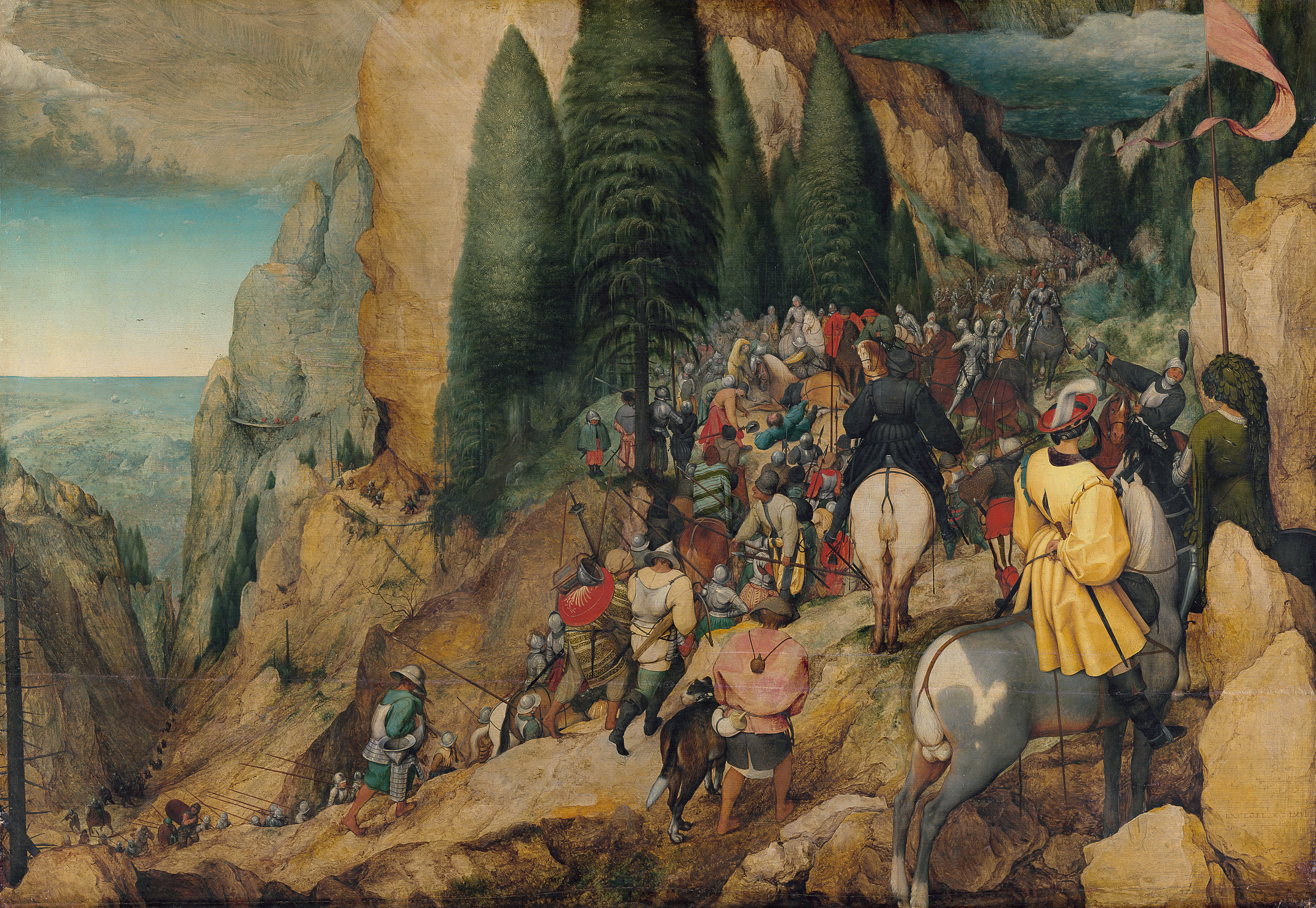
- Artist: Pieter Bruegel the Elder
- Year: 1567
- Type: Oil on panel
- Dimensions: 108 cm × 156 cm (43 in × 61 in)
- Location: Kunsthistorisches Museum, Vienna

Conversion of Paul (Dutch: De bekering van Paulus) is an oil-on-panel painting by the Netherlandish Renaissance artist Pieter Bruegel the Elder, painted in 1567. It is now in the Kunsthistorisches Museum in Vienna.

== Description ==
Bruegel shows Paul's army on its way to Damascus in contemporary dress and with 16th century armour and weapons. The saint himself is in a blue doublet and hose of the painter's day. Bruegel, having lived in Italy, was not unfamiliar with classical dress: his intention in representing biblical scenes in contemporary dress was to stress their relevance to his own time. In view of the persecution and counter-persecution of the Reformation and Counter-Reformation, the story of Paul's conversion had special significance. The events are described in The Acts of the Apostles 9, 3-7:

As he journeyed he came near Damascus, and suddenly a light shone around him from heaven. Then he fell to the ground, and heard a voice saying to him, "Saul, Saul, why are you persecuting Me?"

And he said, "Who are You, Lord?"
Then the Lord said, "I am Jesus, whom you are persecuting. It is hard for you to kick against the goads."
So he, trembling and astonished, said, "Lord, what do You want me to do?"
Then the Lord said to him, "Arise and go into the city, and you will be told what you must do."

And the men who journeyed with him stood speechless, hearing a voice but seeing no one.

— Acts 9:3-7, NKJV

Bruegel is not only illustrating the biblical text; he is also stressing the need for faith and condemning the sin of pride.

=== Details ===
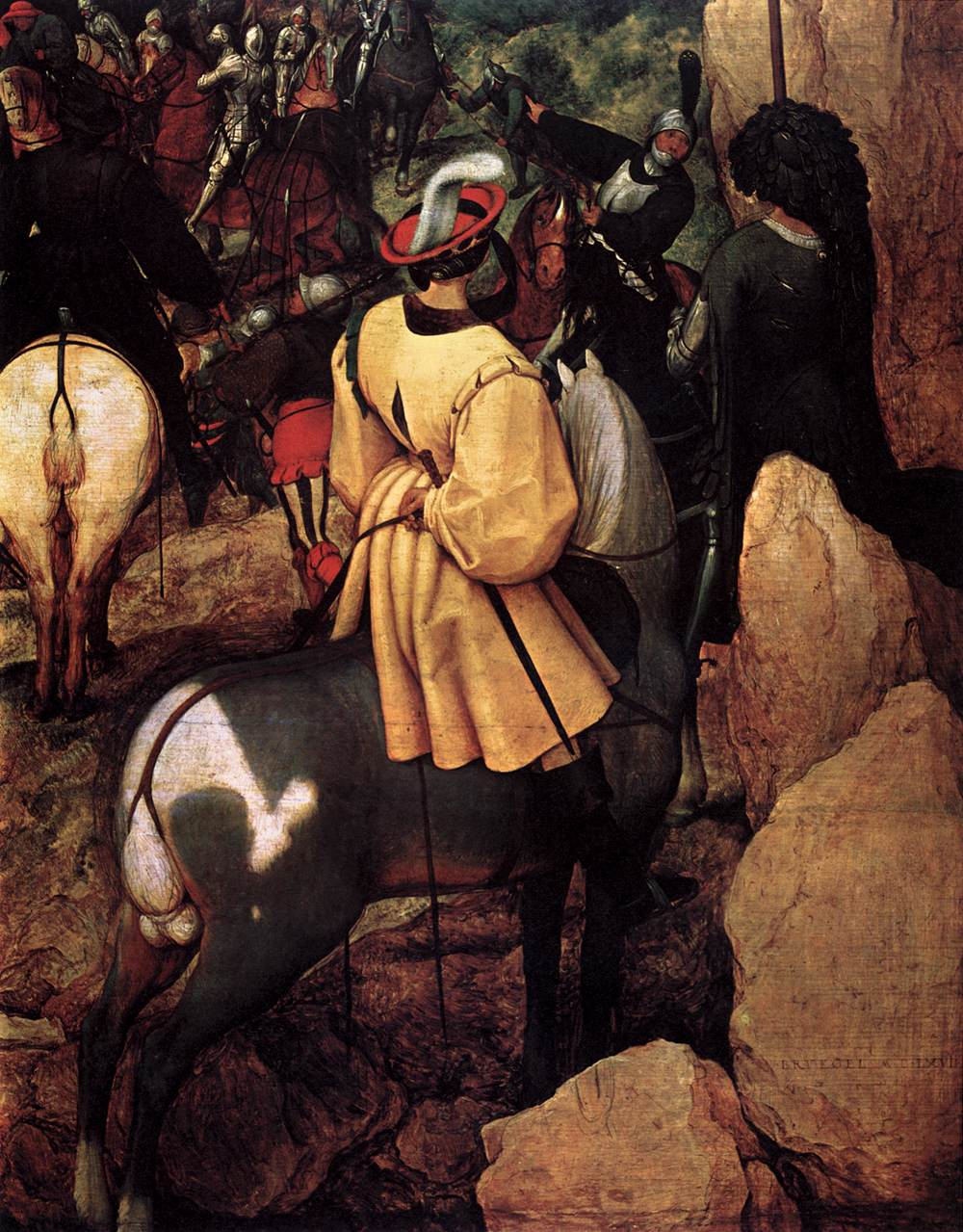
Detail from right composition

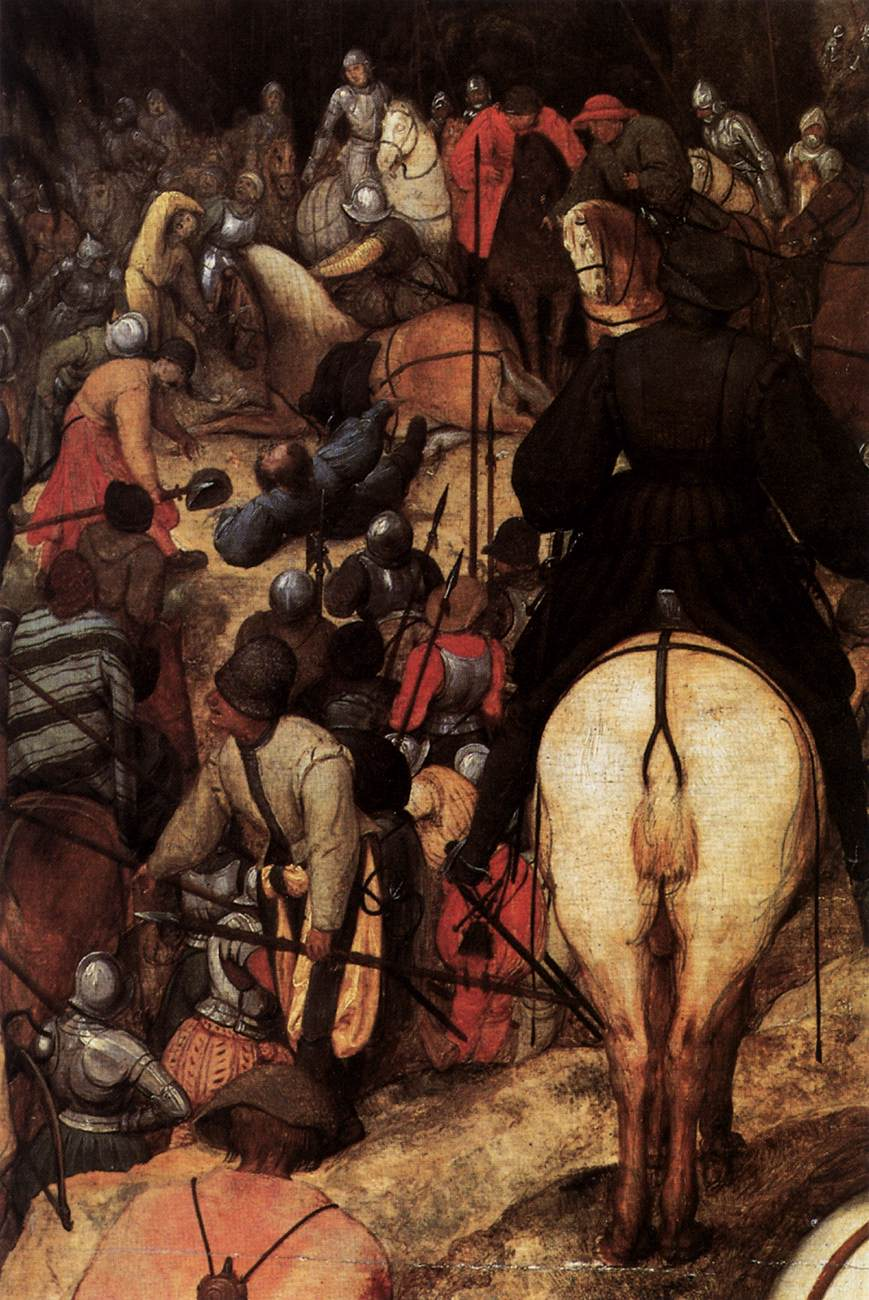
Detail from central composition showing Paul lying on the ground next to his horse

This work was acquired by Archduke Ernest of Austria in 1594, subsequently passing into the imperial collections with Rudolf II, Holy Roman Emperor. Some critics have suggested that the scene depicted by Bruegel refers to contemporaneous events, especially the crossing of the Alps by Don Fernando Álvarez de Toledo y Pimentel, 3rd Duke of Alba in 1567, as he was marching into the Netherlands at the head of an army of 10,000 men to sedate the Dutch revolts.

More probably, Bruegel's depiction of Paul's conversion taking place high up on a pine-clad mountain pass may have been suggested by an engraving of 1509 by Lucas van Leyden. As in The Procession to Calvary and the Preaching of John the Baptist, Bruegel places the principal figures in the middle distance, almost lost amongst a mass of small figures and behind the eye-catching foreground soldiers and horsemen, who are incidental to the telling of the story. This is a familiar mannerist device which is intended to tease the spectator and draw his eye deep into the picture space in search of the principal subject.

== See also ==
- List of paintings by Pieter Bruegel the Elder
