= Four Last Things (video game) =

2017 point-and-click adventure video game

- Designer: Joe Richardson
- Writer: Joe Richardson
- Platforms: Windows, Android, iOS
- Release: WW: 23 February 2017
- Genre: Point-and-click adventure

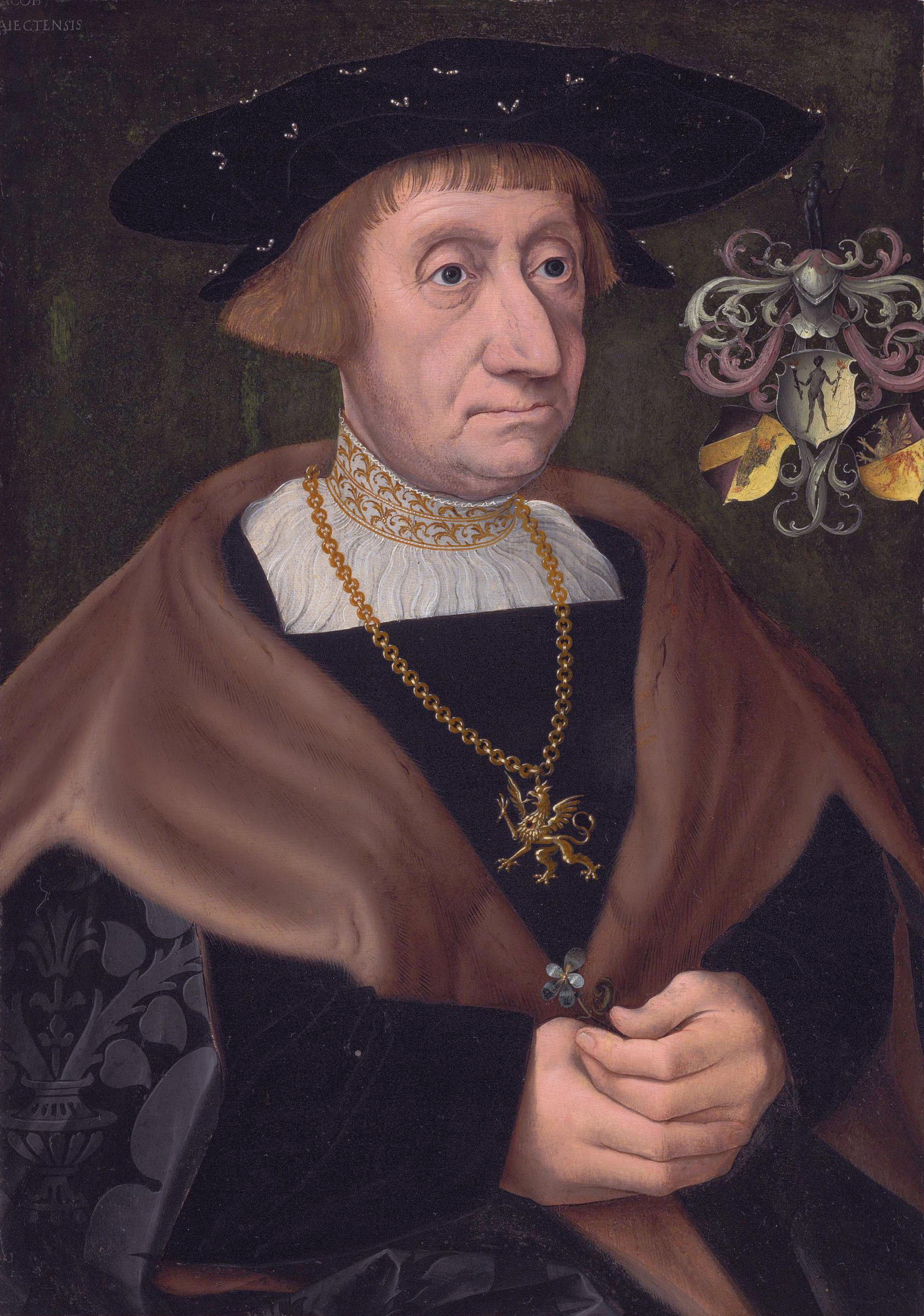
The main character of the game has the face of Mathias Mulich, as painted by Jacob van Utrecht

Four Last Things is a point-and-click adventure video game (see List of graphic adventure games) created by Joe Richardson. It was released on February 23, 2017 for Windows, Android, and iOS.

A PCGamer review called the game a “Monty Python-esque, painterly point and click.”

The art style of Four Last Things consists of animated paintings stitched together into the game world.

It has a sequel, The Procession to Calvary, released in 2020, and a final installment, Death of the Reprobate, released in 2024.

== Reception ==
Reception

Aggregate score
Aggregator	Score
Metacritic	PC: 83/100

Review score
Publication	Score
TouchArcade	iOS: 3.5/5

The game, its concept, and its art were given a fairly positive review in PC Gamer, although the lack of a manual save function was criticized.

It was nominated for Best Art at the Independent Games Festival's award show in Brazil in June 2017.

The International Business Times included it on a list of eight “innovative” indie games at the London Games Festival. The IBT praised the “witty writing” of Richardson, the use of the public domain Renaissance-era paintings, and that the game allowed you to slap bishops.
