= Michael Francis Gibson =

Michael Francis Gibson (18 July 1929 – 7 June 2017) was an American art critic, art historian, writer and independent scholar, who published regularly in the International Herald Tribune, 1969–2004 and occasionally in other publications in English (the New York Times, Art in America, Art News), and French (L'ŒIL, Connaissance des Arts). From 1956 on, Gibson published a number of books, articles, essays and poems in both English and French.

== Life ==
Michael Francis Gibson was born 18 July 1929 inside the American Embassy in Brussels, Belgium, the son of American Ambassador Hugh S. Gibson and his Belgian wife Ynès Reyntiens. After schooling in eight different establishments, six different countries and three different languages (including the Collège Jean de Brébeuf in Montreal and the University of Louvain in Belgium), he settled in Paris in 1958 where he has lived ever since. Married, four children (two of a former marriage).

He translated the Oxford Greek scholar E.R. Dodds' The Greeks and the irrational into French in view of its publication by Aubier-Montaigne in Paris in 1963 (Les Grecs et l'irrationnel). The anthropologist Claude Lévi-Strauss termed it “one of the key books of the present century.”

That same year Gibson founded the Collège Musical de Trie in the small village of Trie-la-Ville at the Château de Trie [www.musica-trie.com], to the north-west of Paris. In this private institution, the musicologist Antoine Geoffroy-Dechaume taught the interpretation of early music (16th to 18th centuries) according to principles laid down in period documents.

The College was visited by such major figures as Yehudi Menuhin, who repeatedly called upon Geoffroy-Dechaume to participate in the Bath festival; Pierre Boulez, who marked the bicentennial of the death of Jean-Philippe Rameau at the Théâtre des Champs Elysées in Paris in 1964 by conducting Geoffroy-Dechaume’s transcription into the modern notation of the opera Hippolyte et Aricie; the guitarist and lutenist Julian Bream who gave a memorable concert in the village church; the conductor André Jouve and his wife, the singer Marie-Thérèse Kahn; the harpsichordist George Malcolm; and the pianist Yvonne Lefébure who was a frequent visitor with her husband, the musicologist Fred Goldbeck.

The young English harpsichord-maker, Anthony Sidey, who had just completed his apprenticeship with the Dolmetsch firm in Surrey, opened a workshop in Trie-la-Ville in 1964. Four years later, after the music center closed, he settled in Paris, where he is still working.

In 1969, Gibson was hired as art critic by the International Herald Tribune. He wrote regularly for that paper for the next 35 years. He also published a number of monographs on Peter Bruegel, Marcel Duchamp and Dada, Symbolist art (Symbolism), Paul Gauguin, Odilon Redon and others. He died on 7 June 2017.

== The Mill and the Cross ==
In 1996 Gibson published a detailed analysis of Peter Bruegel’s 124 x 170 cm, 500-character painting, The Way to Calvary (Kunsthistorisches Museum, Vienna) under the title Le Portement de croix de Pierre Bruegel l'Aîné (Noêsis, Paris). He translated the book into English and it was published under the title The Mill and the Cross in 2001 (Acatlos, Lausanne). The New York Times called it "as readable and riveting as a first-rate spy-thriller."

In January 2011, Lech Majewski’s feature-length eponymous film (with Charlotte Rampling, Michael York and Rutger Hauer) was premiered at the Sundance Film Festival, in Utah. The film is a narrative recreation of Bruegel’s painting which (according to Gibson) evokes the sort of scene that Bruegel himself too often had occasion to witness: the execution of a Flemish Protestant by the militia of the King of Spain.

Writing in Variety on 27 January 2011, Dennis Harvey hailed it as: “An extraordinary imaginative leap, Lech Majewski's "The Mill and the Cross" combines old and new technologies allowing the viewer to live inside the painting—Flemish master Pieter Bruegel's 1564 "The Procession to Calvary," an epic canvas depicting both Christ's crucifixion and the artist's homeland brutalization by Spanish occupiers. Neither conventional costume drama nor abstract objet d'art, this visually ravishing, surprisingly beguiling gamble won't fit any standard arthouse niche. Still it could prove the Polish helmer's belated international breakthrough.”

A new edition of The Mill and the Cross (The University of Levana Press) is now available in English, French and German.

Gibson's "take" on Bruegel's painting perhaps originated in Glenn Jacobs' article in the journal Ultimate Reality and Meaning (V. 2 #1,1979: 29-39), "Pieter Bruegel as an Interpreter of Ultimate Reality and Meaning." This, in turn, is preceded by Jacobs' lengthier treatment of Bruegel in “Convergences of Artistic and Sociological Insight in the Paintings of Pieter Bruegel,” Sociological Abstracts 20 (October, 1972): xxv-xl.

== Other works ==
In 2002, Gibson published "Ces lois inconnues" (Métailié, Paris, in French), an anthropological essay in which he examines what people actually have in mind when they loosely talk of the “meaning of life.” Such “meaning,” he argues, depends on the human capacity to conceive an indefinite goal that is inherent to each culture and is thus held in common by the entire community."

In 2007, under the pseudonym of Miguel Errazu, he published The Riddle of the Seal, the first volume of a fantasy trilogy, "Chronicles of the Greater Dream" (The University of Levana Press). The second volume, The Sleepers of Lethe, appeared in 2010. The third volume, The Garden of All the Dream, came out in 2012.

Central to the trilogy is the question of what is actually happening to the imagination in the contemporary world. The forgotten continent in which the story unfolds is the homeland of the golden Emblemata or Living Statues. This strange and inexplicable natural/cultural phenomenon, has been produced for thousands of years in the great continent known, the author claims, "since highest Antiquity as the Third Hemisphere (and more recently as Gondwana)."

The trilogy was conceived as a playful variation on the anthropological/philosophical speculation of "Ces lois inconnues", touching upon the part played by the purposeful imagination (and the images it ghenerates) in the overall process of cognition, but also in the shaping the individual person and in the general business of keeping society on an even keel. Upon being questioned about the significance of his trilogy, Gibson replied that his theme could perhaps be summed up in the words of Michael Steinberg: "The pretensions of language have become an obstacle to human life."

== Publications ==
- A Study of Hebrew Thought, Claude Tresmontant, (into English, Desclé and Co. 1960)
- A translation of E.R. Dodds’ The Greeks and the Irrational (University of California Press, 1959) into French (Aubier-Montaigne, 1965 and subsequently Flammarion, Paris).
- Peter Brook, after his return from Africa (The Drama Review, in 1973).
- Peter Bruegel (in French Nouvelles Editions Françaises, Paris, 1980 and English Tabard Press, 1986)
- The Symbolists (French Nouvelles Editions Françaises, 1984, English Abrams, 1986)
- Les Horizons du Possible, (French, Ed. du Félin, Paris, 1984)
- Edo Murtic (French, Paris Art Center, 1989)
- Paul Gauguin (in English, French and Spanish, Polygrafa, Spain,1990)
- Duchamp-Dada, (in French, Nouvelles Editions Françaises-Casterman, 1990) International Art Book Award of the Vasari Prize in 1991.
- Symbolism (English, French, German and other languages, Taschen, 1994)
- Odilon Redon (English, French, German and other languages, Taschen, 1995).
- The Mill and the Cross, Peter Bruegel’s Way to Calvary, (in French, Noêsis, 1996 and in English, Acatos, Lausanne, 2001)
- Isia Leviant, Mains (French Cercle d’art, Paris, 1997)
- André Naggar, Images Mentales (English and French, Cercle d’art, 1998)
- Hanneke Beaumont (French, Cercle d’Art, Paris, 2001)
- Ces Lois Inconnues, an anthropological examination of what is meant by “the meaning of life”, (in French Métailié, Paris, 2002)
- Adam Henein (in English, French and Arabic, Skira, 2005)
- Gianguido Bonfanti (English, French and Portuguese, Acatos, 2005). I
- Zoran Music (in French special edition of Connaissance des Arts, 1995).
- The Mill and the Cross, new, enlarged edition, with enlargements of formerly invisible details of the painting. English, French, German, The University of Levana Press, 2012.

== Catalogue texts ==
- Zoran Music, Museum of Fine Arts in Caen, France (1995), the Jewish Museum, New York, (2003) and the Jenisch Museum in Vevey, Switzerland (2003).
- Louis Archambault (Canadian Cultural Center, Paris, 1980)
- Jerzy Stajuda (Guimiot Gallery, Brussels, 1985)
- Miguel Rasero (Guimiot Gallery, 1986)
- Pierre Alechinsky (Guggenheim Museum, New York, 1987)
- Louis Le Broquy (Picasso Museum, Antibes, undated catalogue)
- Elie Abrahami (The Israel Museum, Jerusalem, 1994)
- Jacques Zwobada (Seat of the United Nations, New York, 1996)
- Jean-Michel Folon – Travels (Olympic Museum, Lausanne, 1997)
- Jean-Paul Agosti (Hospice St. Roch, Issoudun, France, 1998)
- Bang Hai Ja (Le Cercle d’Art, Paris, 2001)
- Izhar Cohen (Municipal Art Gallery, Raanana, Israel, 2003).

== Radio work ==
- Radio programs (Radio-Canada, France-Culture) devoted to artistic, cultural and philosophical issues, resulting from his 1975 meeting with the German philosopher Ernst Bloch, with Pierre Furlan and Peter Stein (subsequently published by Arno Münster in Tagträume vom Aufrechten Gang, Suhrkamp Verlag, Frankfurt am Main, 1977).
- André Malraux, French Minister of Culture
- Simone Signoret and Yves Montand, actors
- Joan Miró, Artist
- Zao Wou-ki, Painter.
- Vincent van Gogh Engineer and nephew of the painter
- Günter Grass, Writer
- Philippe Soupault, Poet and cofounder of Surrealism with André Breton
- Tadeusz Kantor, Theater director
- Jean-Michel Folon, Artist
- Hubert Reeves, Physicist
- Sami-Ali, Psychoanalyst
- Vladimir Jankelevitch, Philosopher
- Evgen Bavčar, Blind photographer
- Jean Clair, Museum curator
- Jean-Louis Heim, Paleontologist
- Tomonobu Imamichi, Philosopher
- Arnold Mandel, Writer
- Jean Ladrière, Philosopher
- Jean-Pierre Vernant, Greek scholar
- Christian Dotremont, Artist and writer

== Television and film ==
- An American in Paris and the Polish Question (TV Polonia 2000), two documentary films about Gibson by Stefan Szlachtycz.
- With Polish artist and director Lech Majewski, The Mill and the Cross and 92-minute feature film with Charlotte Rampling, Michael York and Rutger Hauer.
