= The Procession to Calvary (Bruegel) =

1564 painting by Pieter Bruegel the Elder

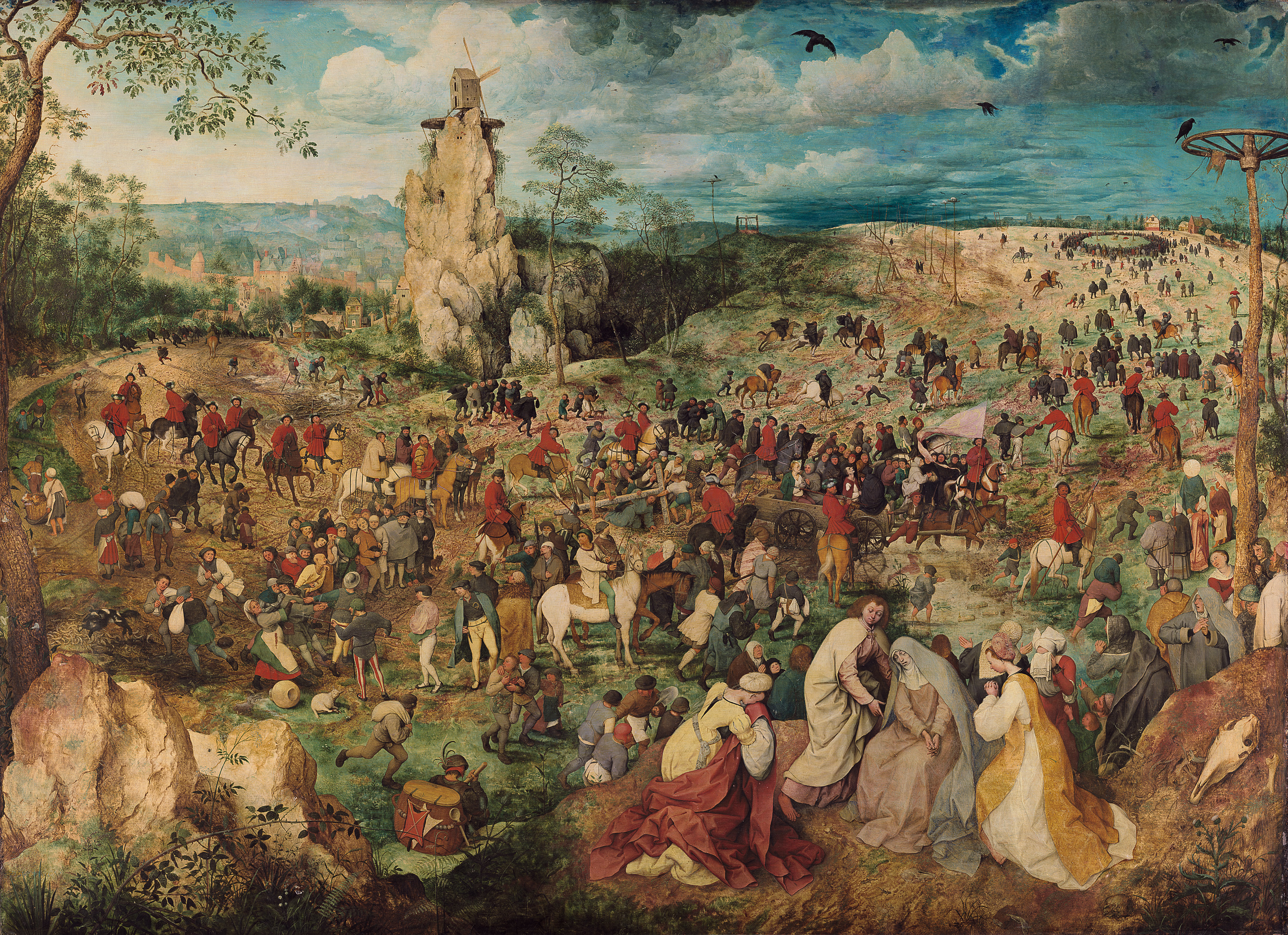
- Artist: Pieter Bruegel the Elder
- Year: 1564
- Type: Oil on panel
- Dimensions: 124 cm × 170 cm (49 in × 67 in)
- Location: Kunsthistorisches Museum, Vienna

The Procession to Calvary is an oil-on-panel by the Netherlandish Renaissance artist Pieter Bruegel the Elder of Christ carrying the Cross set in a large landscape, painted in 1564. It is in the Kunsthistorisches Museum in Vienna.

== History and description ==
This is the second-largest known painting by Bruegel. It is one of sixteen paintings by Bruegel listed in the 1566 inventory of the wealthy Antwerp collector, Nicolaes Jonghelinck. Jonghelinck commissioned the series of paintings of months from Bruegel and may also have commissioned this work. Jonghelinck's Bruegels passed into the possession of the city of Antwerp in the year in which the inventory was made. In 1604 it was recorded in the Prague collections of Rudolf II, Holy Roman Emperor, then transferred to Vienna, and in 1809 (until 1815) in Paris, requisitioned by Napoleon Bonaparte as part of his war booty.

For Bruegel, the composition is unusually traditional. Perhaps because he was treating such a solemn religious event, he adopted a well-known scheme, used previously by the Brunswick Monogrammist and Bruegel's Antwerp contemporary, Pieter Aertsen. Christ's insignificance among the crowds is a familiar device of Mannerist painting (it recurs in the Preaching of John the Baptist, as well as The Conversion of Paul), as is the artificial placing of Mary and her companions in a rocky foreground, which is deliberately distanced from the dramatic events taking place behind them.

=== Details ===
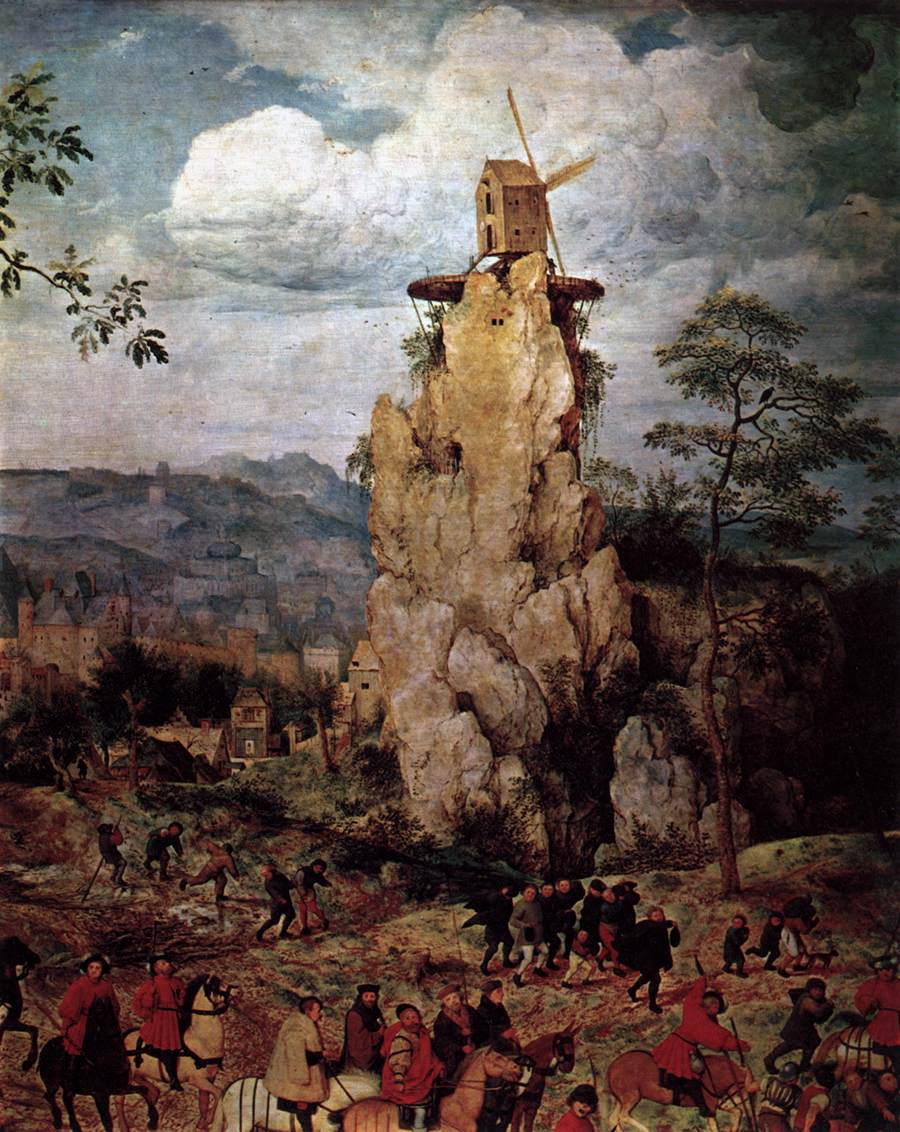
Detail 1 from top left

Bruegel's treatment of landscape evolved in the course of his career from the bird's-eye views and extensive landscapes of the Large landscape series to the remarkable naturalism of his series of the months. Impossibly sheer outcrops of rock like this one at left characterize the landscape tradition of the Antwerp school founded by Joachim Patinir. Patinir's followers – in particular Herri met de Bles, Matthys Cock (the brother of Bruegel's print publisher, Hieronymus Cock) and Cornelis Matsys – had turned his style into a popular but stale formula. The sequence of Bruegel's landscape drawings and of the landscape in his paintings shows the gradual abandonment of this formula.

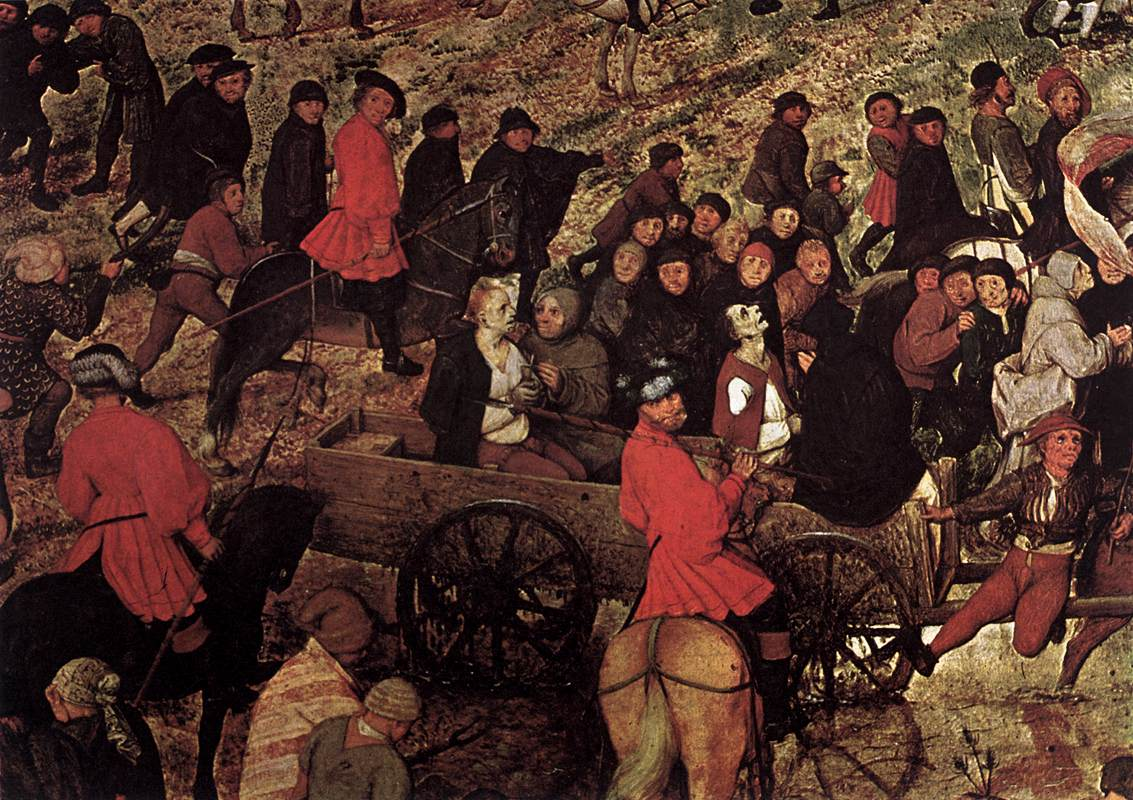
Detail 2 from centre right

In a detail such as this at right, Bruegel's painting possesses a vividness which would seem to come from his observation of contemporary life. Public executions were a familiar feature of 16th century life, especially in troubled Flanders. Here Bruegel shows the two thieves who were to hang on either side of Christ being trundled to the place of execution. Anachronistically, both clutch crucifixes and are making their final confessions to the cowled priests beside them. The thieves, their confessors and the ghoulish spectators who surround the cart are all in contemporary dress. In Bruegel's day public executions were well attended occasions which had the air of festivals or carnivals. Here Bruegel shows the absolute indifference of the gawping crowds to the fear and misery of the condemned men. (Elsewhere in the picture he shows the pickpockets and the pedlars who preyed upon the crowds at such events.) It is noteworthy that Bruegel makes no distinction between the two thieves, one of whom Christ was to bless.

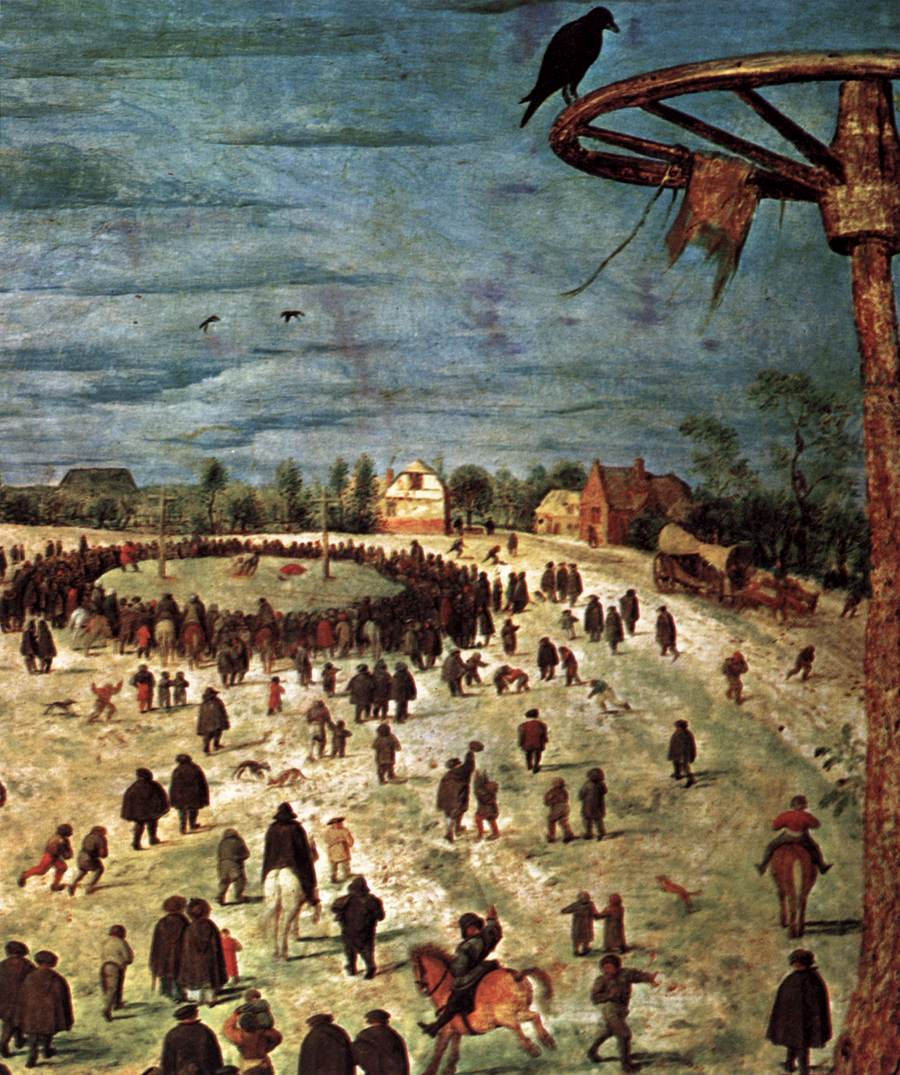
Detail 3 from right margin

On the mount of Golgotha (literally, 'place of skulls') the two crosses which are to bear the bodies of the thieves have been erected and a hole is being dug for the cross which is to bear Christ's body, as may be seen in the detail at left. Onlookers on foot and on horseback flock towards this gruesome spot through a landscape dotted with gallows on which corpses still hang and wheels to which fragments of cloth and remnants of broken bodies not eaten by the ravens still cling.

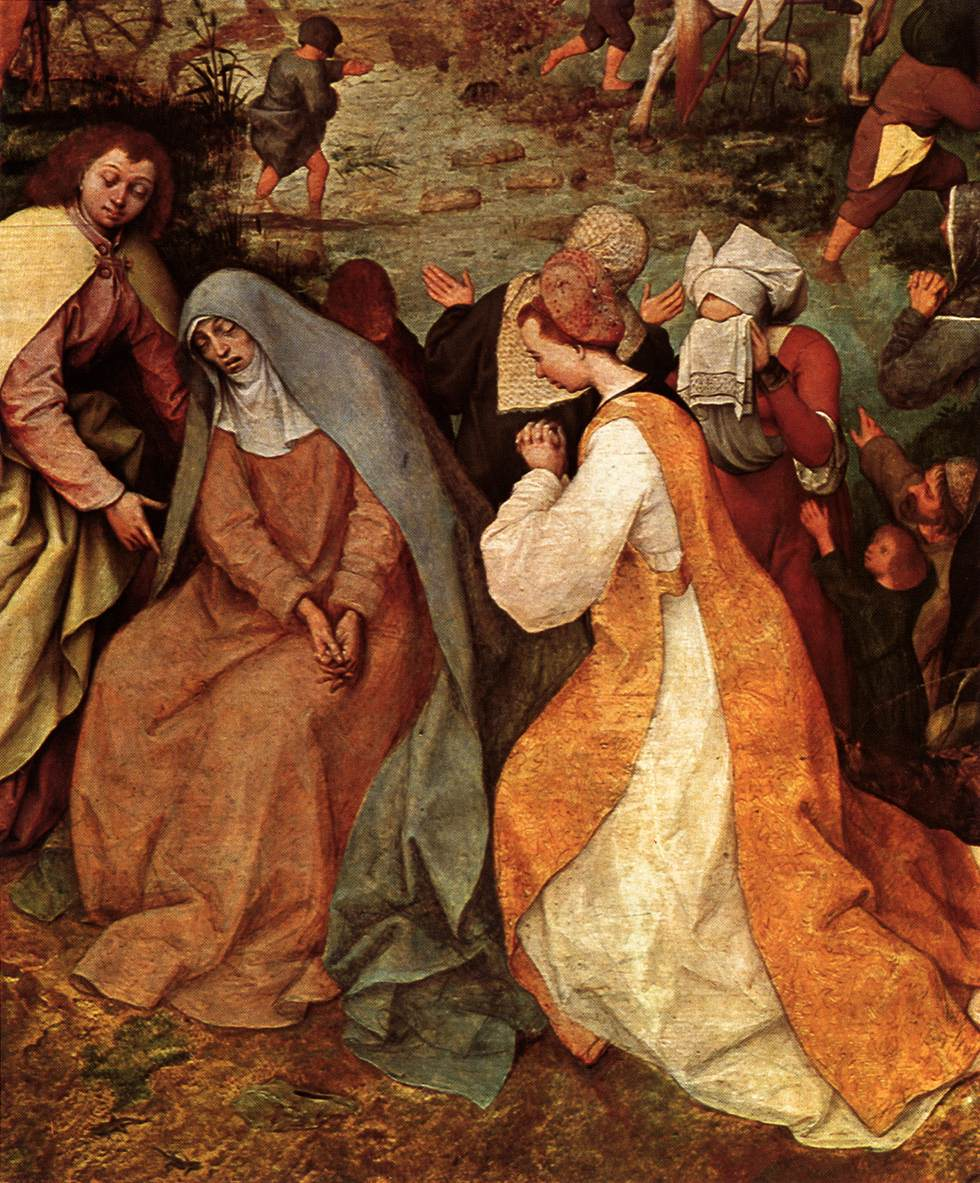
Detail 4 from bottom right

With the exception of Christ himself, the figures in the procession wear contemporary dress, and there can be no doubts that Bruegel meant his representation of the scene to have a particular reference to his own day. The sacred figures – the fainting Virgin assisted by Saint John and the other two Marys (only one of whom is shown here in the detail) – are separated from the main events by being placed on a small, rocky plateau. They act out their own, apparently independent, drama, largely unnoticed by the figures behind them. Larger than the background figures and isolated from them, are the Virgin and her companions.

== Film treatment ==
Michael Francis Gibson wrote an art-historical book entitled The Mill and the Cross, which served as the basis for the 2011 film The Mill and the Cross, directed by Lech Majewski. The film sets into their historical context in sixteenth-century Flanders the characters in the painting and the circumstances of the painting's creation. The films stars Rutger Hauer as Bruegel, Michael York as his patron Niclaes Jonghelinck and Charlotte Rampling as the Virgin Mary.

== See also ==
- List of paintings by Pieter Bruegel the Elder

== Gallery of Details ==
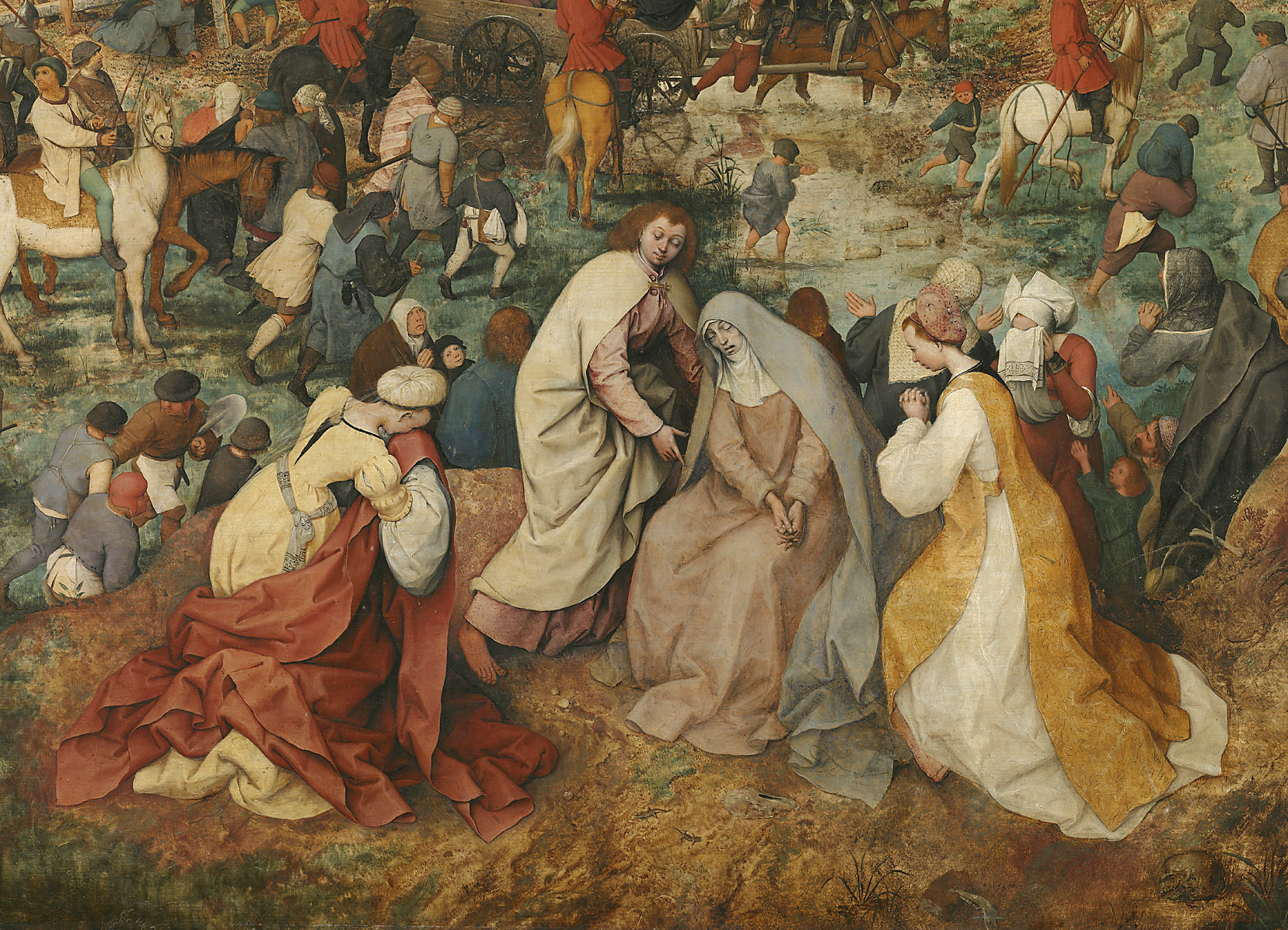
The three Marys and St John

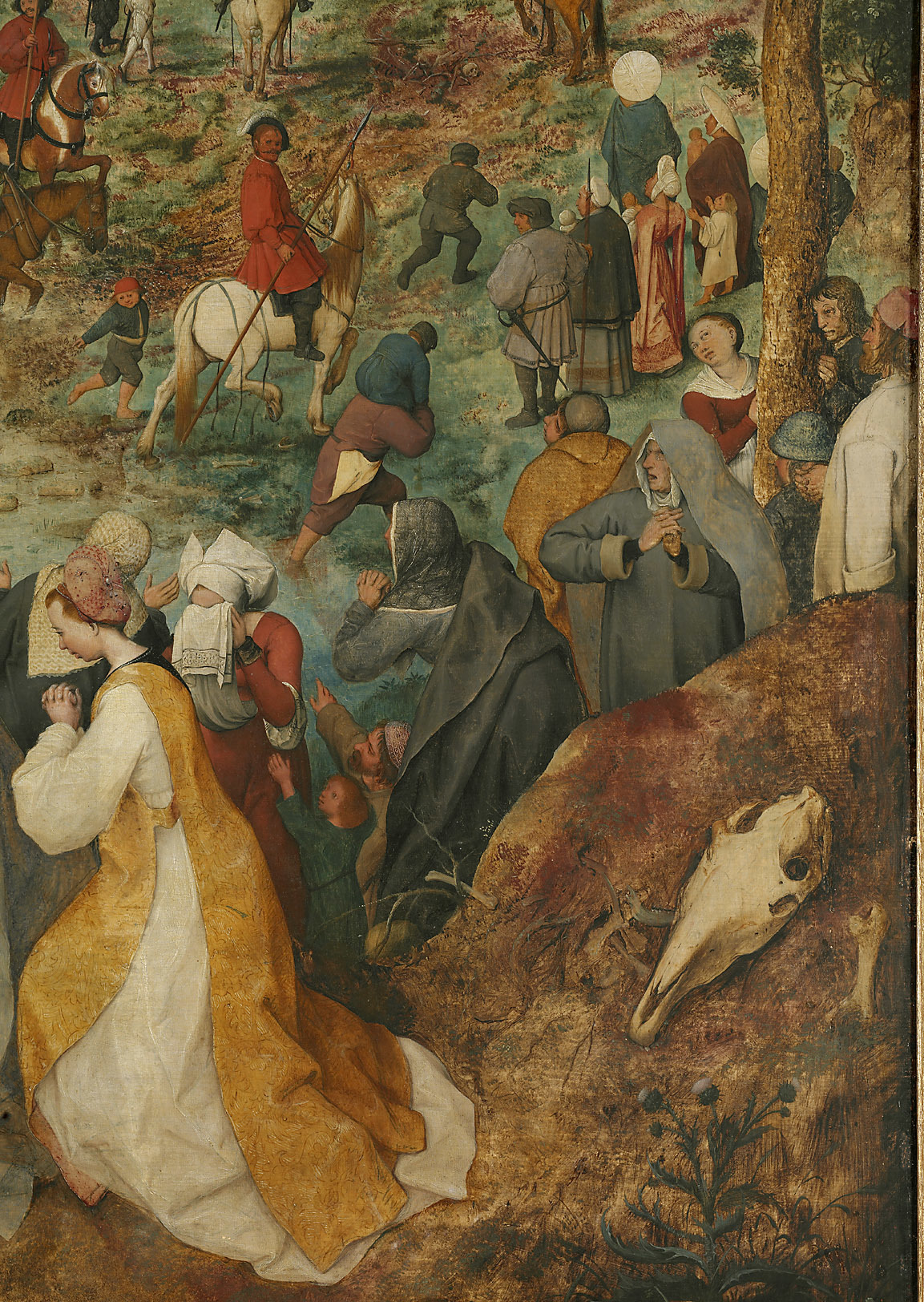
Skull and people

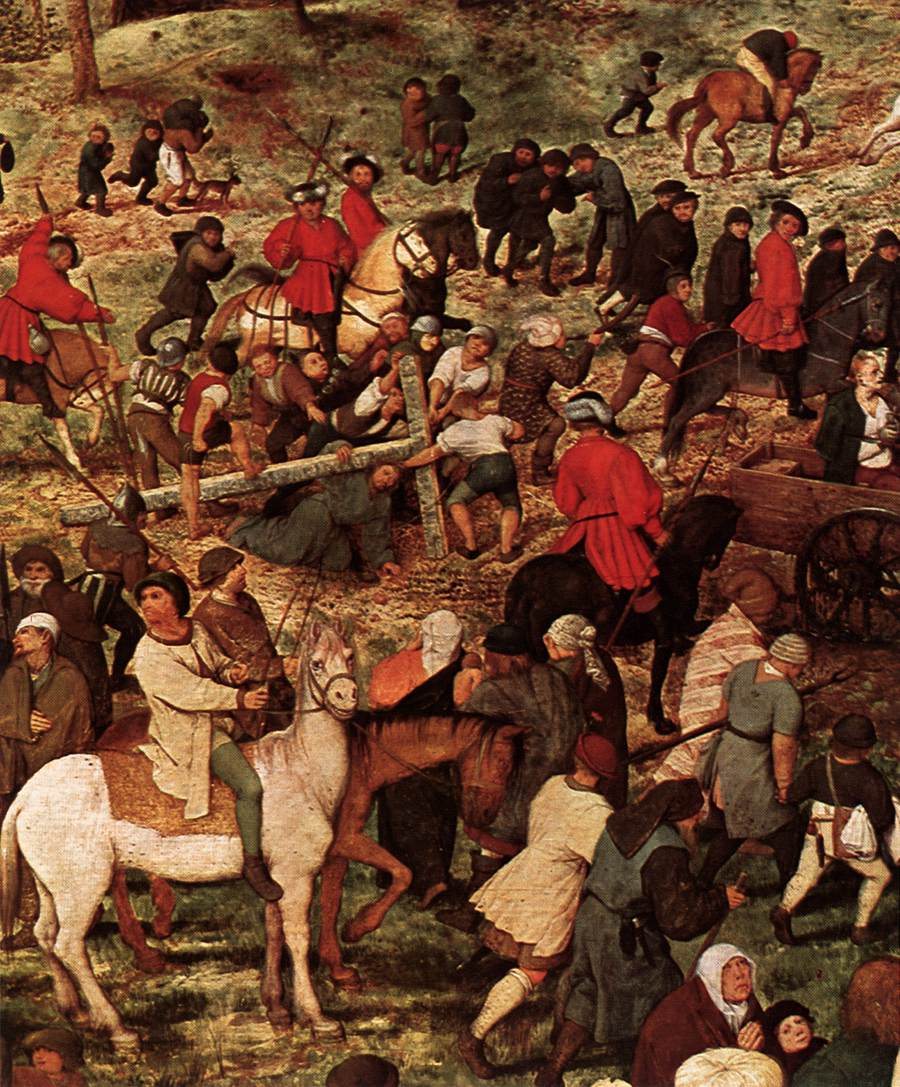
Christ falls in carrying the cross

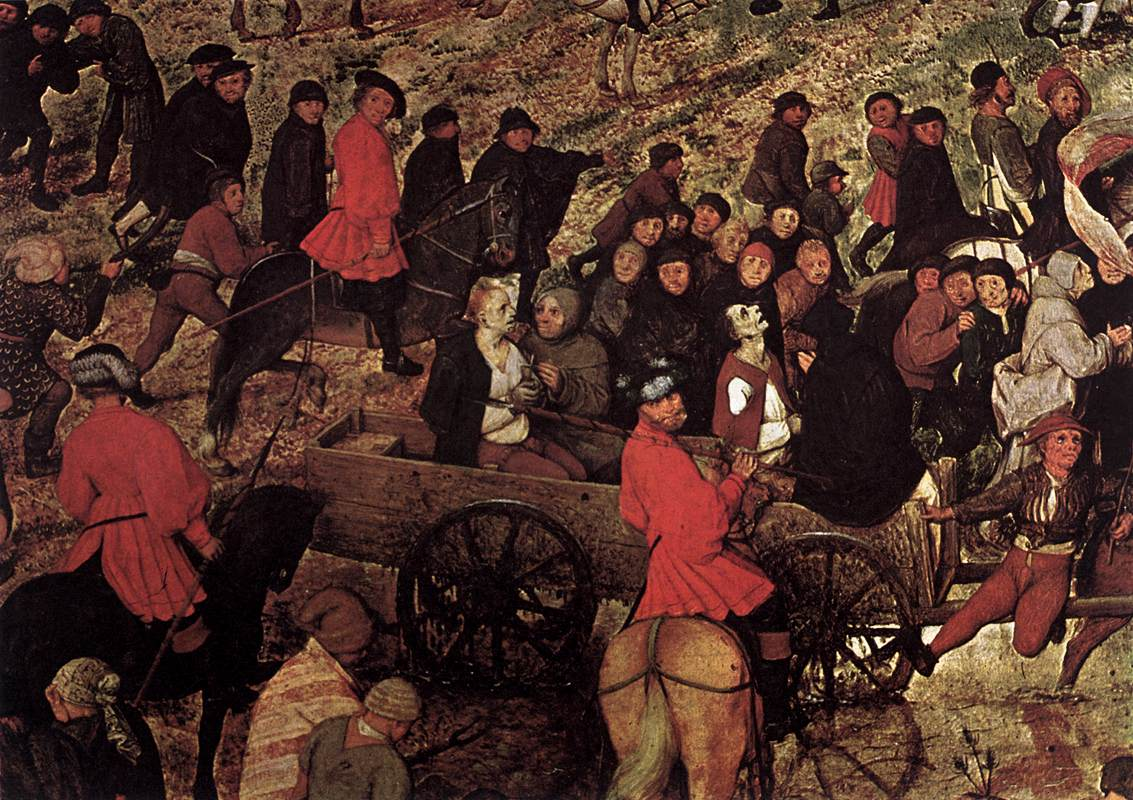
Cart with the two thieves

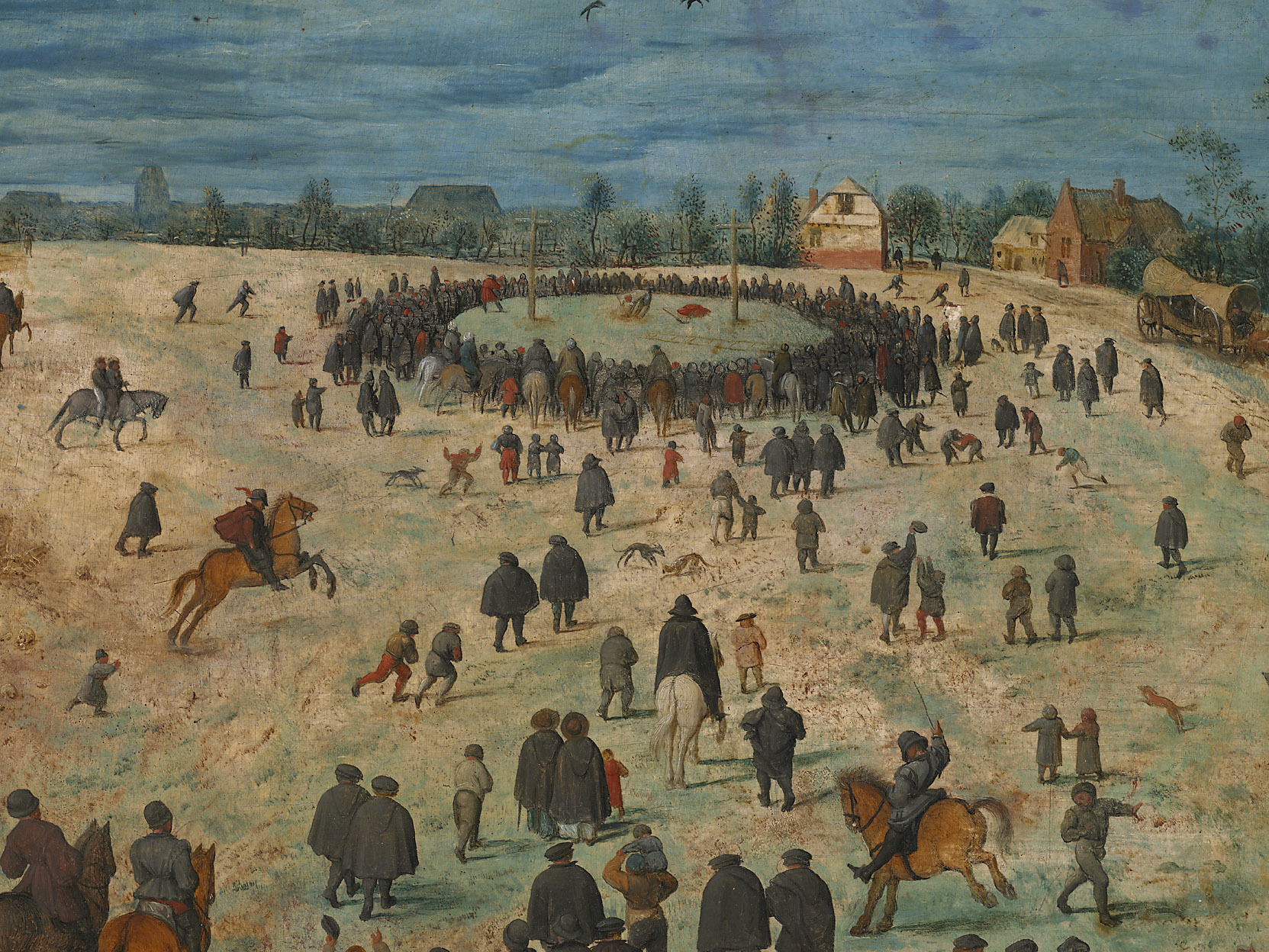
Golgotha

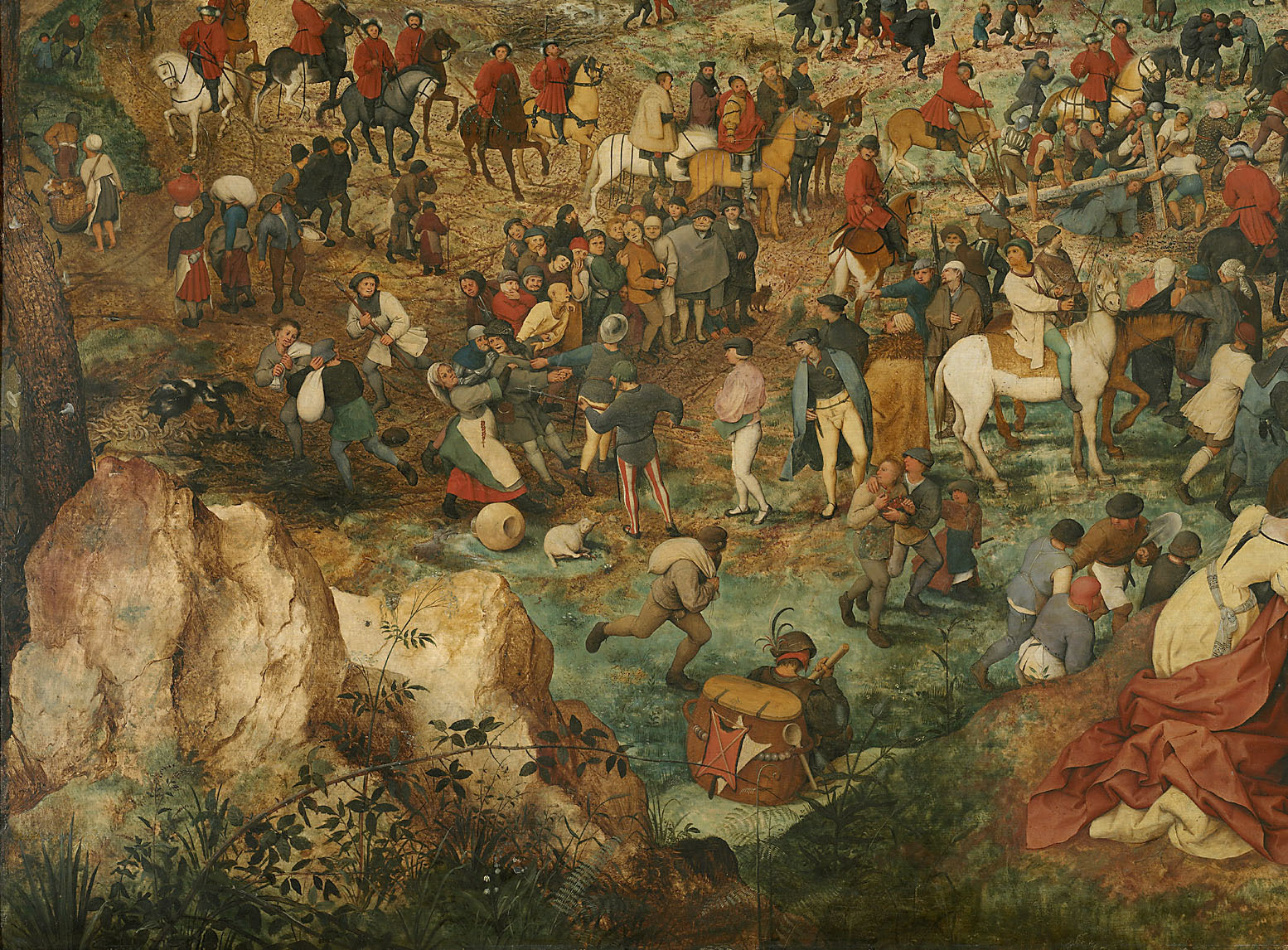
Simon of Cyrene

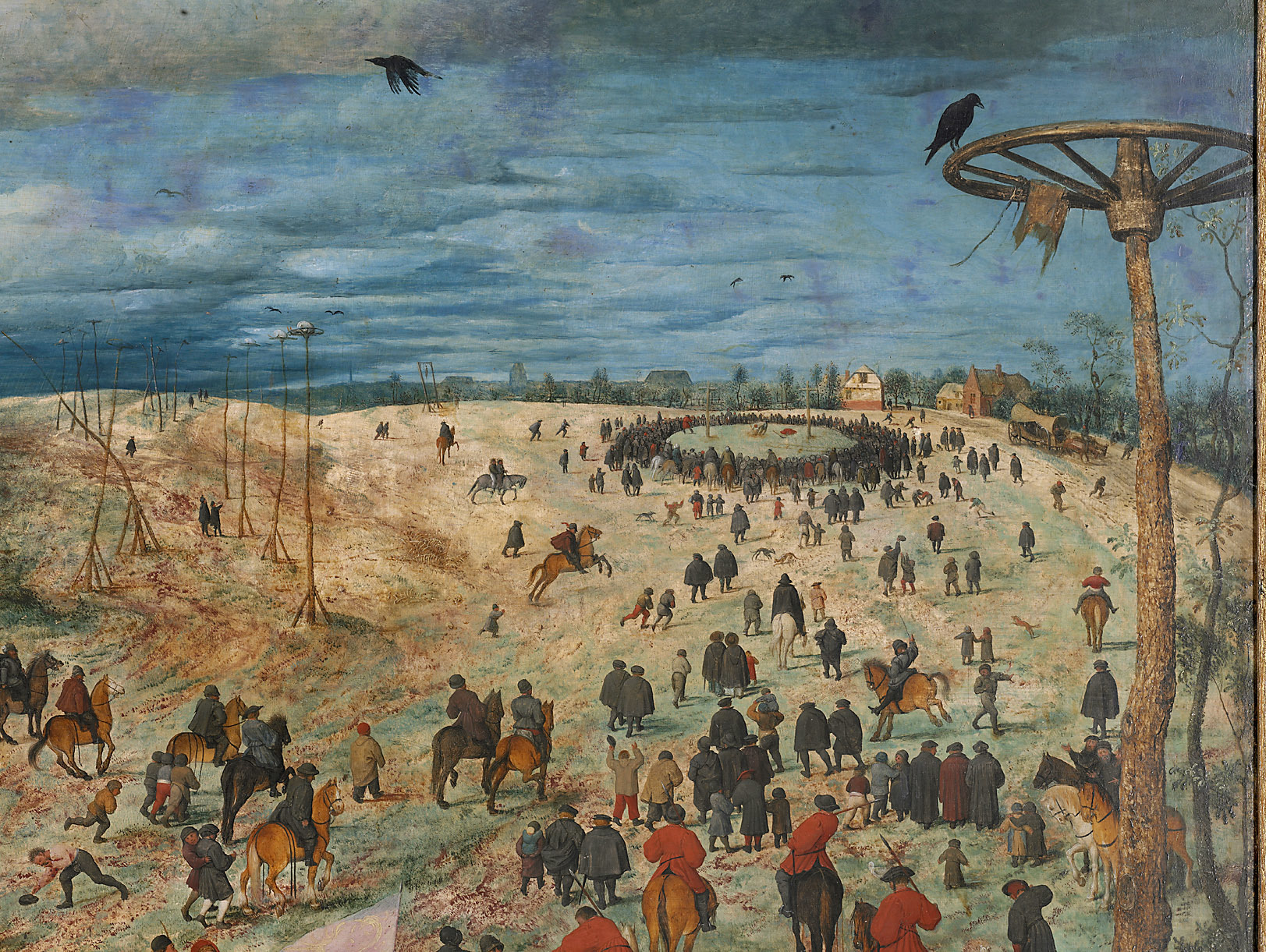
Pole and ravens

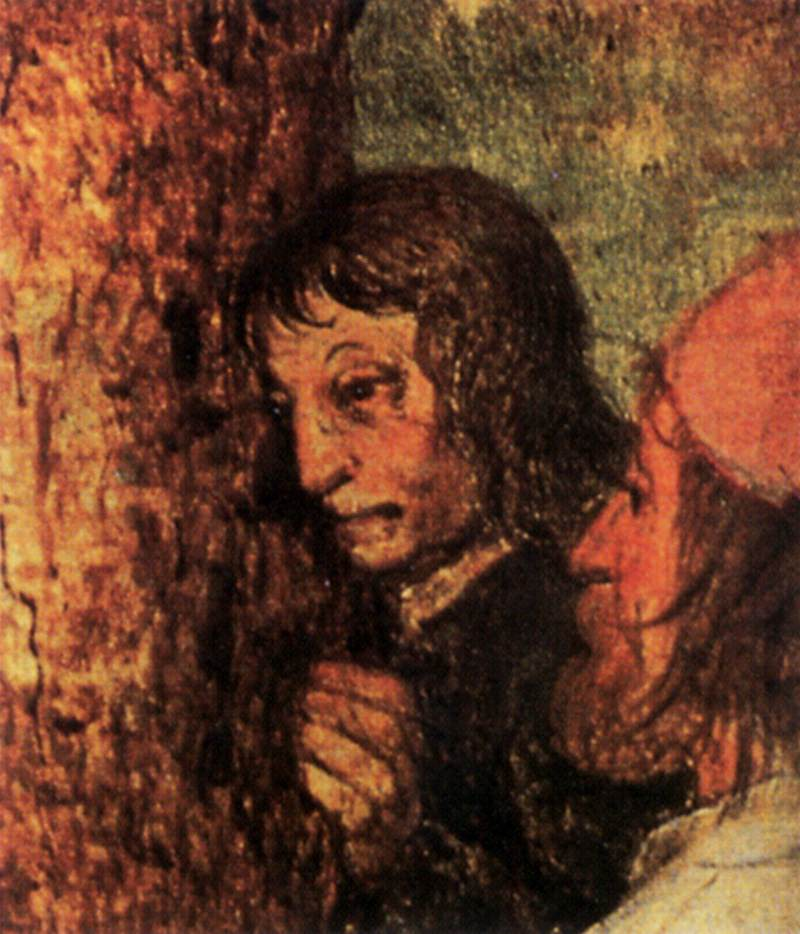
Two figures at the base of the pole

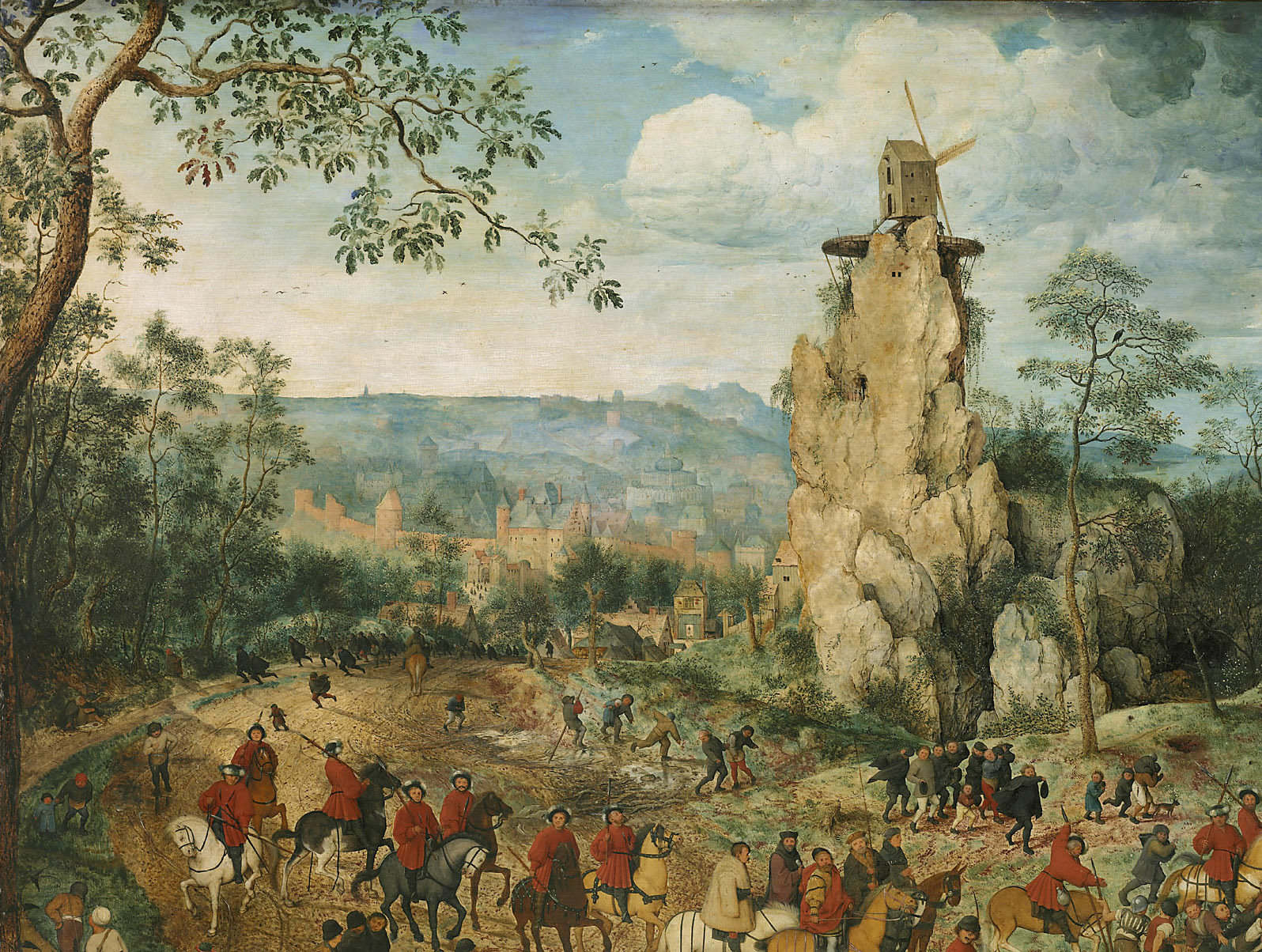
The landscape
