= Gianguido Bonfanti =

Brazilian painter, printmaker and sculptor (born 1948)

- Gianguido Bonfanti
- Born: 5 October 1948 (age 78); São Paulo, Brazil
- Education: Accademia di Belle Arti di Roma
- Known for: Painting, printmaking, drawing, sculpture, illustration

Gianguido Bonfanti (born 5 October 1948) is a Brazilian painter, printmaker, draughtsman, sculptor and illustrator based in Rio de Janeiro. He has taught at the Escola de Artes Visuais do Parque Lage (EAV) since 1978 and is the school's longest-serving teacher.

He has held solo exhibitions at the Museum of Modern Art of Rio de Janeiro, the National Museum of Fine Arts and the Paço Imperial, as well as in Paris, Lisbon and Florence. In 2022 he created the monument to Empress Teresa Cristina installed in Praça Itália, in central Rio de Janeiro.

== Early life and education ==
Bonfanti was born in São Paulo into a family of Italian origin, the son of the painter Gianfranco Bonfanti, and has lived most of his life in Rio de Janeiro. His paternal grandfather, Luigi Augusto Bonfanti, a native of Milan, settled in Rio de Janeiro in 1930 as director of the shipping company Italia di Navigazione.

From 1962 he studied drawing under the printmaker Poty Lazzarotto. In the late 1960s he enrolled in architecture at the Federal University of Rio de Janeiro and took visual arts courses at the Ouro Preto Winter Festival. Amid the repression that followed Institutional Act Number Five in 1968, when fellow students were being persecuted, he obtained a transfer to Rome through the Italian consulate. Instead of continuing his architecture studies there, he passed the entrance examination of the Accademia di Belle Arti di Roma, where he studied until the end of 1973.

== Career ==
=== 1970s ===
After returning to Rio de Janeiro, Bonfanti studied metal engraving under Marília Rodrigues at the Escolinha de Arte do Brasil from 1974 to 1977. In 1974 he held a solo exhibition of drawings at the Museu de Arte Contemporânea do Paraná in Curitiba, and he took part in the Panorama de Arte Atual Brasileira at the Museum of Modern Art of São Paulo in 1974, 1977 and 1980.

In the second half of the decade he worked as an illustrator for the periodicals O Pasquim, Opinião, Ele & Ela and Jornal do Brasil, and for the book Sangue, Papéis e Lágrimas by Doc Comparato. He also designed the theatre of the Centro Cultural Cândido Mendes and the set for Bráulio Pedroso's play As Gralhas. Until the end of the 1970s he refused to use colour, working exclusively in drawing and printmaking.

=== 1980s–1990s ===
In the early 1980s Bonfanti turned to colour and to oil painting, and began teaching at several institutions in Rio de Janeiro. In 1985 the dealer Franco Terranova organised the exhibition Gianguido Bonfanti – pinturas e guaches 1983–1985 at the Espaço Petite Galerie; on that occasion the collector Gilberto Chateaubriand acquired the first of his works for his collection. Solo exhibitions followed at the Thomas Cohn gallery in Rio de Janeiro in 1988 and at the Paulo Figueiredo gallery in São Paulo in 1991. In 1996 the Museum of Modern Art of Rio de Janeiro held a solo exhibition of his work, with a catalogue introduced by the critic Frederico Morais.

=== 2000s ===
The National Museum of Fine Arts in Rio de Janeiro presented solo exhibitions of his work in 2000 (Gianguido Bonfanti: 1996–2000) and 2002. In a column for O Estado de S. Paulo, the critic Daniel Piza discussed his portraits alongside those of Ferreira Gullar. Further solo exhibitions took place at the Museu Metropolitano de Arte de Curitiba in 2004, at the Galerie Le Troisième Œil in Paris in 2005 and in Bordeaux in 2006, and at the Paço Imperial in 2009. In 2004 he illustrated the novel Caligrafias by Adriana Lisboa, reissued in 2025 in an anniversary edition with a new selection of his drawings.

=== 2010s–present ===
From the 2010s Bonfanti also worked in sculpture. In 2017 the Paço Imperial presented Bonfanti: esculturas e pinturas, 2010–2017, and in the same year he exhibited with the artist Pérola Bonfanti in transHumanizar–transFigurar at the Wozen Gallery in Lisbon and again at the Galerie Le Troisième Œil in Paris.

In June 2022 the Accademia delle Arti del Disegno in Florence held a solo exhibition of his work, curated by Giacomo Pirazzoli. In October 2023 the EAV Parque Lage presented Gianguido Bonfanti: massas de energia no espaço, curated by Daniele Machado and Alberto Saraiva, marking 55 years of his career. Although he had taught at the school for 45 years, it was his first solo exhibition there. The show included around seventy previously unexhibited works, among them drawings, paintings and a large installation of ceramics. He exhibited new paintings, drawings and sculptures at the Galeria Evandro Carneiro in Rio de Janeiro in 2024, and a retrospective at La Sphère in Paris in 2025.

== Monument to Empress Teresa Cristina ==
On 14 March 2022, the bicentenary of the birth of Empress Teresa Cristina, a monument to her by Bonfanti was unveiled in Praça Itália in central Rio de Janeiro. Donated by the Consulate General of Italy, it replaced an earlier bust that had been stolen in 2019. The 1.95 m (6 ft 5 in) work combines a bronze bust with steel plates outlining the Empress's figure in period dress. Two cut-out images on the base, a jar and a feather headdress, refer to the cultural exchange between Italy and Brazil: the archaeological pieces she brought from Italy to the National Museum of Brazil and the Indigenous objects she sent to Italy.

== Style and reception ==
The curator Alberto Saraiva has placed Bonfanti's work within an expressionist tradition that includes Lasar Segall and Iberê Camargo, noting his successive moves from drawing to painting and from painting into physical space through ceramics.

== Teaching ==
In addition to the EAV Parque Lage, where he has taught since 1978, Bonfanti has taught at the Pontifical Catholic University of Rio de Janeiro, the Faculdade da Cidade and the Casa de Cultura Laura Alvim.

== Collections ==
His work is held in the Gilberto Chateaubriand Collection, much of which has been on long-term loan to the Museum of Modern Art of Rio de Janeiro since 1993.

== Selected solo exhibitions ==
- 1974 – Museu de Arte Contemporânea do Paraná, Curitiba
- 1985 – Espaço Petite Galerie, Rio de Janeiro
- 1988 – Thomas Cohn Arte Contemporânea, Rio de Janeiro
- 1991 – Paulo Figueiredo Galeria de Arte, São Paulo
- 1996 – Museum of Modern Art of Rio de Janeiro
- 2000 and 2002 – National Museum of Fine Arts, Rio de Janeiro
- 2004 – Museu Metropolitano de Arte de Curitiba
- 2005 – Galerie Le Troisième Œil, Paris
- 2006 – Galerie Le Troisième Œil, Bordeaux
- 2009 – Paço Imperial, Rio de Janeiro
- 2010 – Gustavo Rebello Arte, Rio de Janeiro
- 2017 – Paço Imperial, Rio de Janeiro
- 2017 – Wozen Gallery, Lisbon (with Pérola Bonfanti)
- 2017 – Galerie Le Troisième Œil, Paris
- 2022 – Accademia delle Arti del Disegno, Florence
- 2023 – EAV Parque Lage, Rio de Janeiro
- 2024 – Galeria Evandro Carneiro, Rio de Janeiro
- 2025 – La Sphère, Paris

== Publications ==
- Bonfanti. Acatos, 2005. Texts by Michael Francis Gibson and Daniel Piza.
- Bonfanti. Rio de Janeiro: Contra Capa, 2009. Texts by Guilherme Bueno and Viviane Matesco.
- Gianguido Bonfanti. Florence: Accademia delle Arti del Disegno, 2022. Edited by Giacomo Pirazzoli.
