= The Peasant and the Nest Robber =

Painting by Pieter Bruegel the Elder

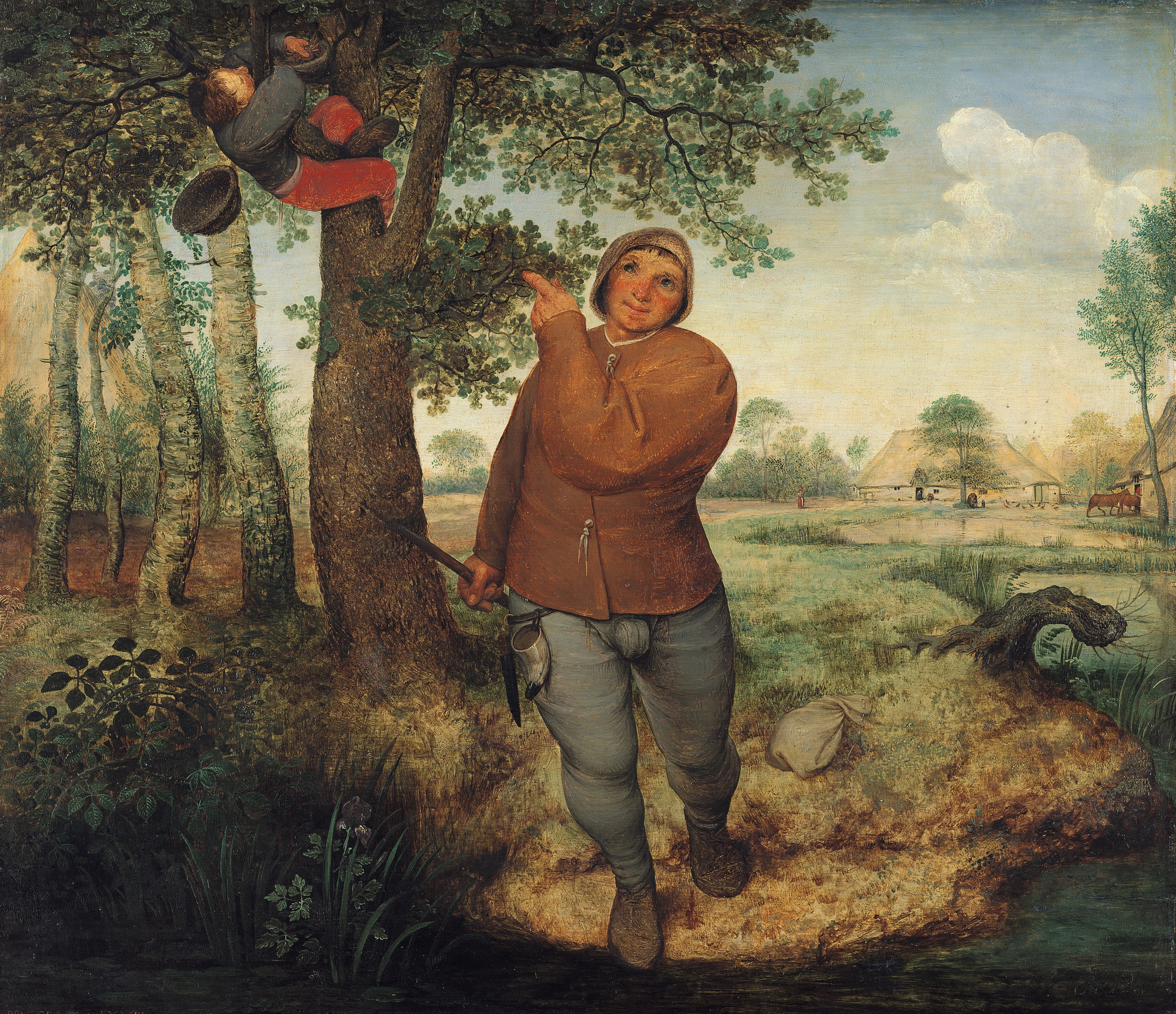
- Artist: Pieter Bruegel the Elder
- Year: 1568
- Type: Oil on panel
- Dimensions: 59.3 cm × 68.3 cm (23.3 in × 26.9 in)
- Location: Kunsthistorisches Museum, Vienna

The Peasant and the Nest Robber (also The Peasant and the Birdnester) is an oil-on-panel painting by the Netherlandish Renaissance artist Pieter Bruegel the Elder, painted in 1568. It is in the Kunsthistorisches Museum in Vienna.

== Description ==
This painting was in the collections of since 1569; passed on to the imperial collection, it became part of those of the Kunsthistorisches Museum at its inauguration. Painted the year before the artist's death, this painting, like other late works such as The Land of Cockaigne, The Peasant Dance, and The Peasant Wedding, is dominated by monumental figures. Immediately after his return from Italy, Bruegel showed no apparent interest in Italian figure types and compositions, reverting to the Antwerp tradition in which he had been trained. However, in these late works he shows that his study of Italian painting had taken root: these figures demonstrate his knowledge of Italian art and in particular the art of Michelangelo.

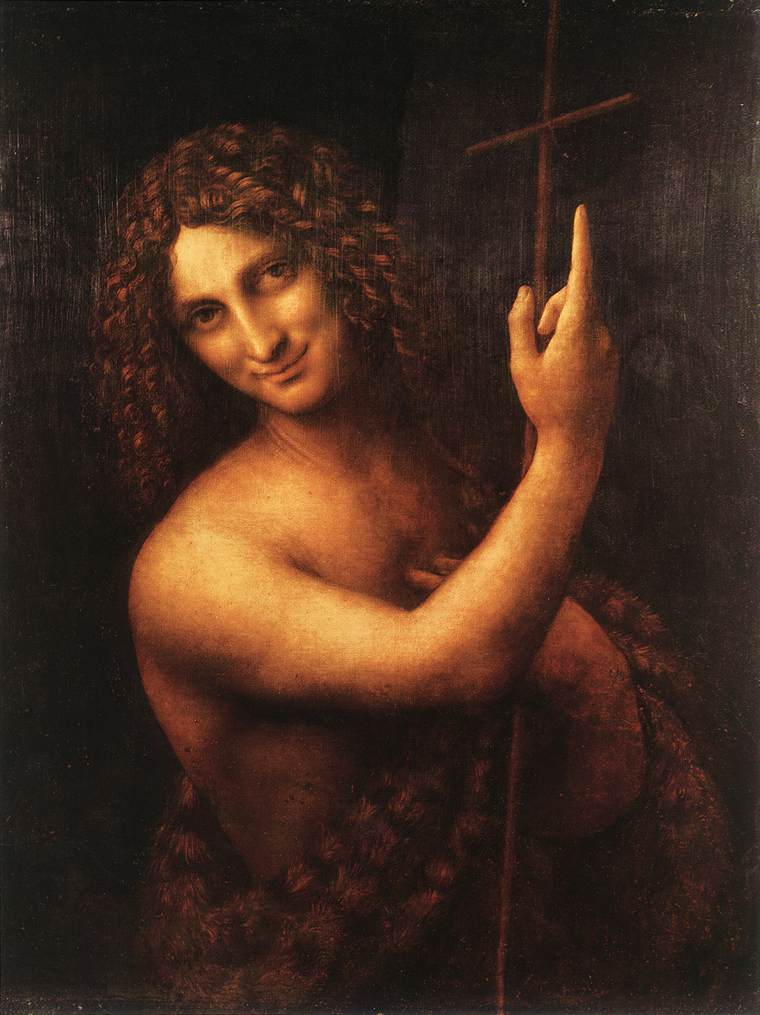
St John the Baptist, by Leonardo da Vinci, 1513–16.

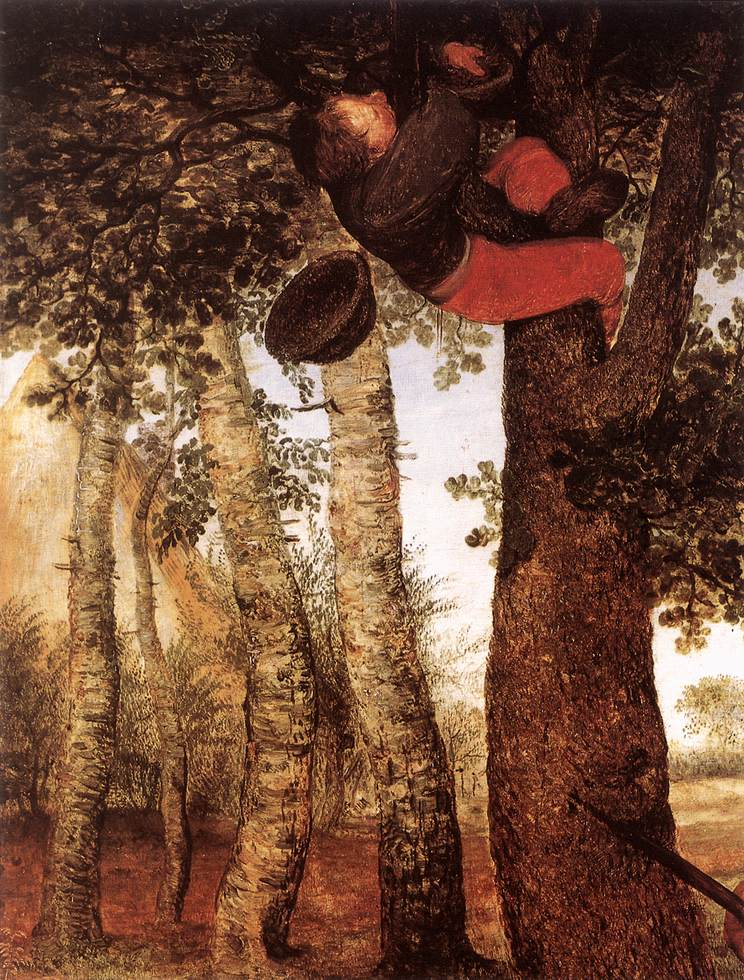
Detail of the Nest Robber

This unusual subject apparently illustrates a Netherlandish proverb:

Dije den nest Weet dijen weeten, dijen Roft dij heeten
He who knows where the nest is, has the knowledge, he who robs, has the nest.

The painting presents a moralising contrast between the active, wicked individual and the passive man who is virtuous in spite of adversity (a similar theme appears in his drawing The Beekeepers) And lastly it could be suggested that the pointing man is making judgement on the robber whilst not aware that he is nearly stepping into the water in front of him.

It has been suggested that, with his knowledge of Italian art, Bruegel intended the peasant's gesture as a profane parody of the gesture of Leonardo's St John ^{see image at left}.

== See also ==
- List of paintings by Pieter Bruegel the Elder
