= The Wedding Dance =

Painting by Pieter Bruegel the Elder

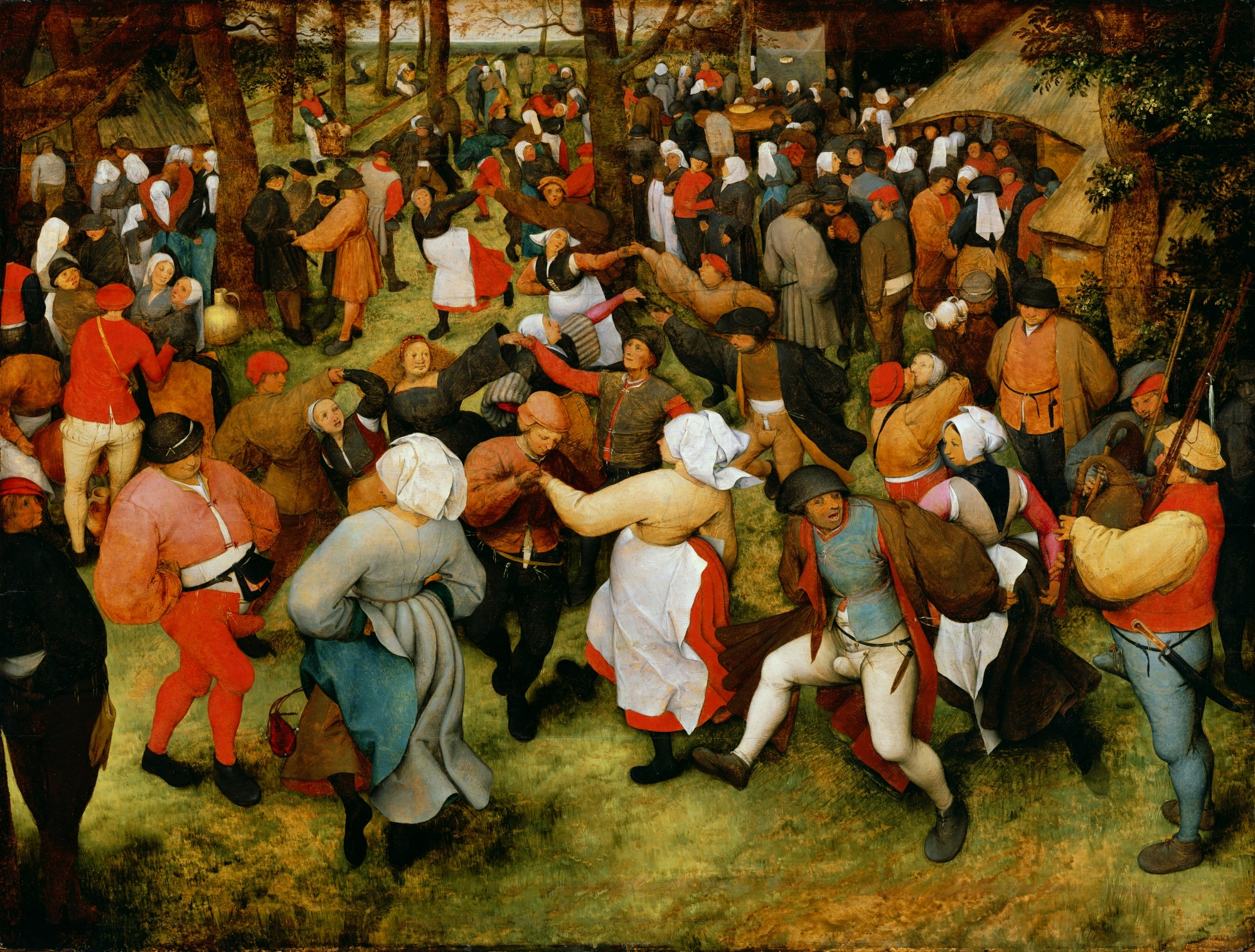
- Artist: Pieter Bruegel the Elder
- Year: 1566
- Medium: oil-on-panel
- Dimensions: 119.4 cm × 157.5 cm (47 in × 62 in)
- Location: Detroit Institute of Arts, Detroit

The Wedding Dance (sometimes known as The Village Dance) is a 1566 oil-on-panel painting by the Netherlandish Renaissance artist Pieter Bruegel the Elder. Owned by the museum of the Detroit Institute of Arts in Detroit, Michigan, the work was discovered by its director in England in 1930, and brought to Detroit. It is believed to be one of a set of three Bruegel works from around the same time: The Wedding Dance, The Peasant Wedding (1567) and The Peasant Dance (1569).

The painting depicts 125 wedding guests. As was customary in the Renaissance period, the brides wore black and men wore codpieces. Voyeurism is depicted throughout the entire art work; dancing was disapproved of by the authorities and the church, and the painting can be seen as both a critique and comic depiction of a stereotypical oversexed, overindulgent, peasant class of the times. Scholars have variously interpreted it as moral critique, as comedy, and as close observation of village custom. A technical study published by the museum in 2019–20 revealed changes made to the painting after Bruegel's lifetime, including the overpainting of the codpieces and a later addition to the top of the panel.

== Background ==
Pieter Bruegel the Elder completed The Wedding Dance in 1566. It was believed to have been lost for many years, until discovered at a sale in London in 1930 by Wilhelm Valentiner, the director of the Detroit Institute of Arts at the time. Valentiner paid $35,075 for The Wedding Dance through a city appropriation. It is still owned by the museum.

The Peasant Wedding (1567) and The Peasant Dance (1569), also by Bruegel, share the same wedding theme and elements and were painted in the same period in Bruegel's later years. They are considered to be a trilogy of works by Bruegel. In all three of the paintings, there are pipers playing the pijpzak (bagpipes), they also exude pride and vanity; for example, in The Peasant Dance, the man seated next to the pijpzak player is wearing a peacock feather in his hat.

Robert L. Bonn, an author, described these trilogy of works as "superb examples" of anthropological paintings, and states that "in three genre paintings Bruegel stands in marked contrast both to painters of his day and many others who followed". Thomas Craven summarises The Wedding Dance as "[o]ne of several celebrations of the joys of gluttony painted by Brueghel with bursting vitality". Walter S. Gibson also views the paintings as a "sermon condemning gluttony" and "an allegory of the Church abandoned by Christ".

== Description and themes ==
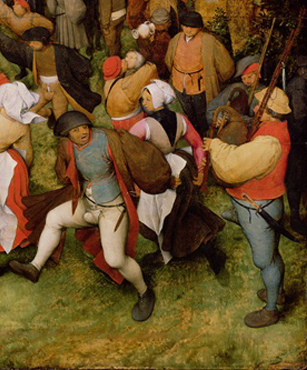
Lower right-hand detail

The popular painting shows a group of 125 wedding guests wearing clothing from the times, presented in the canvas in an apparently chaotic way in an outdoor party surrounded by trees. The brides wore black as it was the Renaissance period and the men wore codpieces, which were an important part of their clothing at the time. Voyeurism (spying on people engaged in intimate behaviours) is shown throughout the work.

In the foreground there is a dancer wearing the colours of that time period and there are many peasants in that area. In the middle there is the bride dancing with an older man, her father. On the right of the work, behind a musician playing on a pijpzak, there is a man watching the dance from the side. Judging by the writing utensils hanging on his belt, he is a writer or possibly a middle-class painter. Behind him is a hanging tablecloth decorated with a crown and beneath it is the bride's table. Before her table, money collectors can be seen digging trenches while the wedding guests sit down and eat.

The movements of the people show that their behaviour is inappropriate or a caricature of rustic buffoonery, but its representation of fertility and reproduction is presented in a joyful manner. Indeed, the painting reflects a degree of ambiguity in that it can both be seen as an attack on the stereotypical oversexed behaviour of the lower orders as well as evoking a comical picture. In the sixteenth century, when this was painted, dance was subject to a strict code and regarded by the authorities and church as a social evil. People could not swing their arms or legs or laugh too loud, as that would be considered a type of rudeness to many people. The painting therefore "expresses the peasants' liberation from the stricter limits of upper classes" by failing to adhere to the expected social standards of the times.

The author of The Theme of Music in Northern Renaissance Banquet Scenes, Robert Quist, has said that the painting was part of a series of Seven Deadly Sins and Virtues and that the paintings "attest to [Bruegel's] moral devotions". He says "While dancing may appear innocuous or natural for peasants, it poses a palpable threat to the human soul. Its [dancing's] usefulness in characterizing the peasantry as wild and unruly undoubtedly derives from the moral opprobrium in which dancing was held by religious and civil authorities alike."

=== Interpretation ===
How Bruegel's peasant scenes should be read has long been debated. The earliest biographical account, by Karel van Mander in his Schilder-boeck (1604), describes Bruegel attending peasant weddings and fairs in the company of the merchant Hans Franckert in order to observe the peasants' manners, an account that has supported readings of such works as close observation of village life. In the 1970s Svetlana Alpers argued that Bruegel's peasant festivities belong to a festive and comic mode rather than functioning as moral sermons, a view contested by Hessel Miedema, who maintained that contemporary viewers would have understood the peasants as moral exempla. More recently, Joseph Leo Koerner has traced how Bruegel's scenes of everyday village life developed out of Hieronymus Bosch's "enemy painting", in which evil lies hidden within ordinary existence; reviewers have differed on how far his account presents Bruegel's everyday world as secular or as morally charged.

== Conservation and technical study ==
At an unknown date, lines were scratched into five of the most prominent codpieces and the area was subsequently painted over; a 1941 restoration removed the overpaint and revealed the codpieces again.

Following several years of archival research and scientific analysis, including X-ray fluorescence and infrared reflectography, the Detroit Institute of Arts presented its findings in the exhibition Bruegel's The Wedding Dance Revealed (December 14, 2019 – August 30, 2020). Conservators found that the narrow board along the top of the panel came from a different tree and lacks Bruegel's underdrawing, indicating a later addition that may date from as late as 1750; the museum has suggested that Bruegel likely never intended the composition to include a horizon. The underdrawing, executed in black chalk, shows that Bruegel originally drew a small crown on the bride, which does not appear in the finished painting. Pigment analysis identified vermilion in the bagpiper's red vest and laked cochineal in the bride's headband.

== See also ==
- List of paintings by Pieter Bruegel the Elder
- Renaissance banquet
