= The Suicide of Saul =

Painting by Pieter Bruegel the Elder

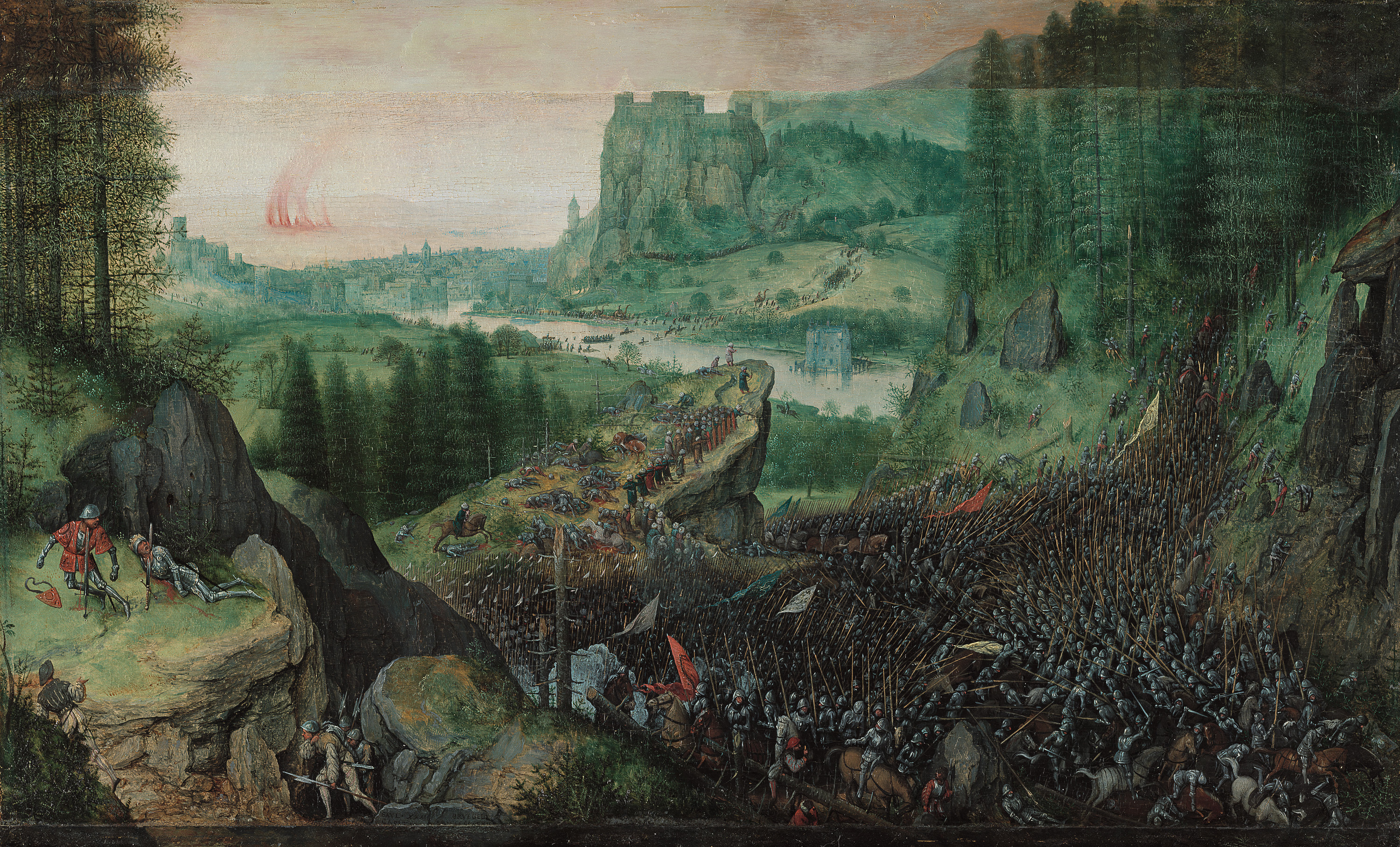
- Artist: Pieter Bruegel the Elder
- Year: 1562
- Type: Oil on panel
- Dimensions: 33.5 cm × 55 cm (13.2 in × 22 in)
- Location: Kunsthistorisches Museum, Vienna

The Suicide of Saul is an oil-on-panel painting by the Flemish Renaissance artist Pieter Bruegel the Elder, painted in 1562. It is in the collection of the Kunsthistorisches Museum, in Vienna.

The Suicide of Saul is an early attempt by Bruegel to reconcile landscape and figure painting. Despite the scale of the subject, at 33.5 cm × 55 cm (13.2 in × 22 in) it is rather small compared to his later landscape subjects, but has an "astonishingly dense and highly dramatic composition". If it is compared with one of his last works, The Magpie on the Gallows of 1568, its weaknesses are apparent: the foreground and background are not yet reconciled and the jutting outcrop of rock in the centre ^{see 2nd detail} is a Mannerist device which one may see again in The Procession to Calvary. However, the distant world landscape is seen through a shimmering haze, which seems to have the effect of emphasizing the foreground detail, and this does represent a new stage in the evolution of Bruegel's depiction of naturalistic landscape.

This appears to be the first time this subject was put in a painting, although there had been works in other media, such as manuscript miniatures.

The painting has been cut down, with a thin strip of c. 1cm removed along the bottom, and a rather wider one, c. 4cm, along the top. These portions were later re-added, with new pieces of fruitwood panel, in Vienna in 178–82. The transition is visible in the paint today. A third fallen figure with Saul and the armour-bearer, included in the underdrawing, was never painted.

== Description ==
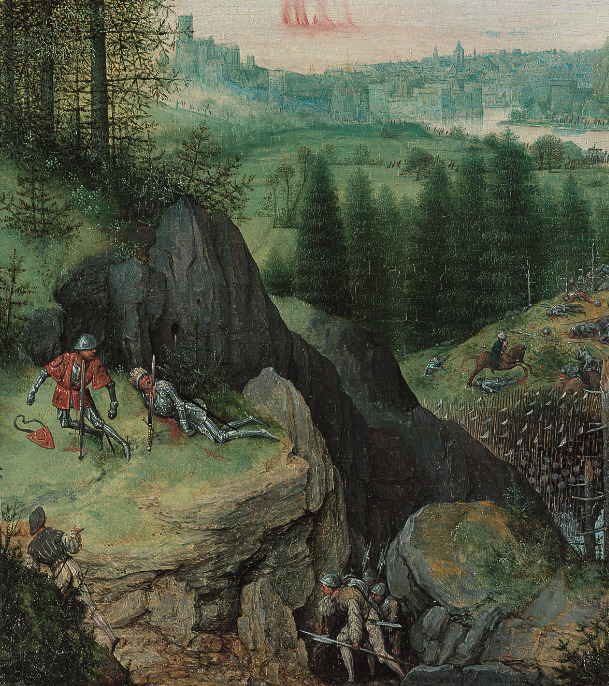
Detail 1; Saul

An inscription on the painting identifies the subject as the rarely represented scene of the suicide of Saul after his defeat by the Philistines. These events are described in 1 Samuel 31, 1-5:

Now the Philistines fought against Israel; and the men of Israel fled from before the Philistines, and fell slain on Mount Gilboa. Then the Philistines followed hard after Saul and his sons. And the Philistines killed Jonathan, Abinadab, and Malchishua, Saul's sons. The battle became fierce against Saul. The archers hit him, and he was severely wounded by the archers.

Then Saul said to his armorbearer, "Draw your sword, and thrust me through with it, lest these uncircumcised men come and thrust me through and abuse me."

But his armorbearer would not, for he was greatly afraid. Therefore Saul took a sword and fell on it. And when his armorbearer saw that Saul was dead, he also fell on his sword, and died with him.

— 1 Samuel 31:1-5, NKJV

Bruegel follows the biblical account closely, representing different parts of the battle in different areas. At the left he has chosen the highly dramatic moment of the death of the armourbearer, just as Philistines are approaching below the rock platform.^{See 1st detail}

Saul's death was interpreted as a punishment of pride - it was among the proud that Dante met Saul in the Purgatorio - and this may account for Bruegel's choice of such an unusual subject. Saul was placed in the 2nd Terrace of Purgatory, with King Nimrod, the subject of another Bruegel painting (in two versions, 1563–65), The Tower of Babel. In 1563 Bruegel also painted The Fall of the Rebel Angels; Lucifer was also mentioned by Dante as an example of pride.

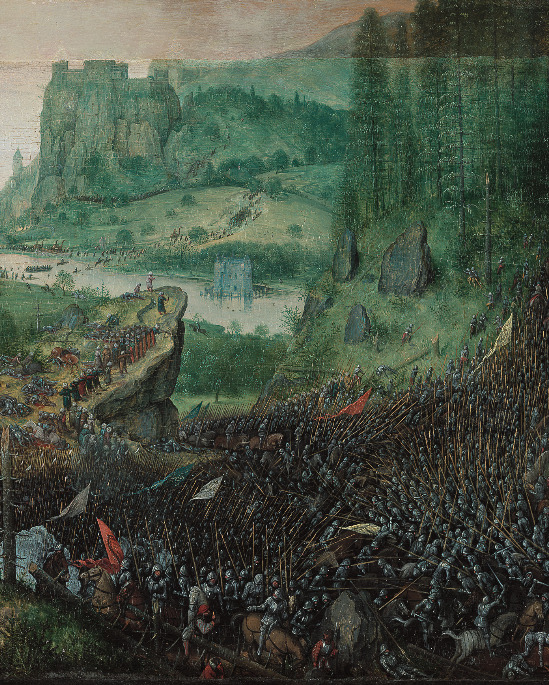
Detail 2

Erasmian tendencies in Renaissance humanism, which may have reflected Bruegel's views, regarded Old Testament narratives as only having "moral value" if they could be understood as "allegories with a universal significance"; here the punishment of pride.

As with most of his subjects taken from the Bible, Bruegel treats Saul's suicide as a contemporary event, showing the armies in 16th century armour. The Philistine army is divided into different brigades, some shown as contemporary Turks. In his The Battle of Alexander at Issus of 1529, the German painter Albrecht Altdorfer had shown the clash of the forces of Alexander the Great and Darius at the Battle of Issus in this way, and in many other respects, too, Bruegel is in Altdorfer's debt, particularly in the representation of the tiny, massed figures of the soldiers and their forests of lances. Bruegel may also have looked at the battle-scenes of another German painter, Jörg Breu the Younger, and at a now lost battle-scene by the Antwerp landscape painter Joachim Patinir which is mentioned by biographer Karel van Mander. A Bruegel drawing, River Valley viewed from a Hill (cat. no. 58, in the 2019 Vienna exhibition), has considerable similaries with the landscape here.

== Provenance ==
Little is known. In 1640 it was possibly in the collection of Rubens in Antwerp, who had other Bruegels, such as the small The Death of the Virgin. However, the catalogue entry describes the work as a watercolour, suggesting either that it was a different work, or referring to the very detailed painting, as in manuscript illumination. By 1781 it had entered the Austrian imperial collection, then mostly collected in the Belvedere, Vienna; this later passed to the Kunsthistorisches Museum.

== See also ==
- List of paintings by Pieter Bruegel the Elder
