= List of paintings by Pieter Bruegel the Elder =

The following is a list of paintings by the Dutch and Flemish Renaissance painter and printmaker, Pieter Bruegel the Elder. These Catalog Numbers correspond to the numbering in Roger Hendrik Marijnissen's book, "Bruegel", with photographs by the Swiss art historian, Max Seidel (New York: Harrison House, 1984).

Image	Title	Year	Technique	Dimensions (cm)	Gallery	Catalog number
	Seascape with Ships and a Burning City (disputed attribution)	1553	Oil on panel	22.4 × 34.8	Private collection, Switzerland	MS 1
	Landscape with Christ and the Apostles at the Sea of Tiberias	1553	Oil on panel	67 x 100	Private collection, New York	MS 2
	The Adoration of the Kings	c. 1556-1562	Tempera on canvas	124 × 169	Royal Museums of Fine Arts of Belgium	MS 4
	Parable of the Sower	1557	Oil on panel	73.7 × 102.9	Timken Museum of Art	MS 5
	Twelve Proverbs	1558	Oil on panel	75 × 98	Museum Mayer van den Bergh	
	Netherlandish Proverbs	1559	Oil on panel	117 × 163	Berlin State Museums	MS 6
	The Fight Between Carnival and Lent	1559	Oil on panel	118 × 164	Kunsthistorisches Museum	MS 7
	Children's Games	1560	Oil on panel	118 × 161	Kunsthistorisches Museum	MS 8
	Naval Battle in the Gulf of Naples	c. 1560	Oil on panel	42.2 × 71.2	Doria Pamphilj Gallery	MS 9
	Landscape with the Fall of Icarus (copy)	1560s	Oil on canvas	73.5 × 112	Royal Museums of Fine Arts of Belgium	MS 3
	The Suicide of Saul	1562	Oil on panel	33.5 × 55	Kunsthistorisches Museum	MS 10
	The Fall of the Rebel Angels	1562	Oil on panel	117 × 162	Royal Museums of Fine Arts of Belgium	MS 12
	Mad Meg (Dulle Griet)	1562	Oil on panel	117.4 × 162	Museum Mayer van den Bergh	MS 13
	The Triumph of Death	с. 1562	Oil on panel	117 × 162	Prado	MS 14
	Two Monkeys	1562	Oil on panel	20 × 23	Berlin State Museums	MS 15
	The Tower of Babel	1563	Oil on panel	114 × 155	Kunsthistorisches Museum	MS 16
	The Tower of Babel	1563–1565	Oil on panel	59.9 × 74.6	Museum Boijmans Van Beuningen	MS 17
	Landscape with the Flight into Egypt	1563	Oil on panel	37.1 × 55.6	Courtauld Institute Galleries	MS 18
	Portrait of an Old Woman	1563	Oil on panel	22 × 18	Alte Pinakothek	MS 38
	Adoration of the Magi in the Snow	1563	Oil on panel	35 × 55	Oskar Reinhart Collection 'Am Römerholz', Winterthur	MS 33
	Yawning Man (disputed attribution)	c. 1563	Oil on panel	12.6 x 9.2	Royal Museums of Fine Arts of Belgium	
	The Adoration of the Kings	1564	Oil on panel	111.1 × 83.2	The National Gallery, London	MS 19
	The Procession to Calvary	1564	Oil on panel	124 × 170	Kunsthistorisches Museum	MS 20
	Death of the Virgin	1564	Oil on panel	36 × 55	Upton House	MS 21
	Haymaking	1565	Oil on panel	117 × 161	Lobkowicz Palace at the Prague Castle Complex	MS 22
	The Harvesters	1565	Oil on panel	116.5 × 159.5	Metropolitan Museum of Art	MS 23
	The Return of the Herd	1565	Oil on panel	117 × 159	Kunsthistorisches Museum	MS 24
	The Hunters in the Snow	1565	Oil on panel	117 × 162	Kunsthistorisches Museum	MS 25
	The Gloomy Day	1565	Oil on panel	118 × 163	Kunsthistorisches Museum	MS 26
	Massacre of the Innocents	1565–1567	Oil on panel	109.2 × 158.1	Royal Collection and at Upton House, Warwickshire	MS 27
	Winter Landscape with a Bird Trap	1565	Oil on panel	37 × 55.5	Royal Museums of Fine Arts of Belgium, and many copies; it is Bruegel's most copied work	MS 28
	Christ and the Woman Taken in Adultery	c. 1565	Oil on panel	24 × 34	Courtauld Institute Galleries	MS 29
	The Wine of Saint Martin's Day	1565–1568	Tempera on canvas	148 × 270.5	Prado	
	The Wine of Saint Martin's Day (copy)	1565–1568	Oil on canvas	147 × 269.5	Royal Museums of Fine Arts of Belgium	
	The Census at Bethlehem	1566	Oil on panel	115.5 × 163.5	Royal Museums of Fine Arts of Belgium	MS 30
	The Sermon of Saint John the Baptist	1566	Oil on panel	95 × 160.5	Museum of Fine Arts (Budapest)	MS 31
	The Wedding Dance	c. 1566	Oil on panel	119.4 × 157.5	Detroit Institute of Arts	MS 32
	The Land of Cockaigne	1566	Oil on panel	52 × 78	Alte Pinakothek	MS 37
	Conversion of Paul	1567	Oil on panel	108 × 156	Kunsthistorisches Museum	MS 34
	The Peasant Wedding	1568	Oil on panel	114 × 164	Kunsthistorisches Museum	MS 35
	The Peasant Dance	1568	Oil on panel	114 × 164	Kunsthistorisches Museum	MS 36
	The Peasant and the Nest Robber	1568	Oil on panel	59.3 × 68.3	Kunsthistorisches Museum	MS 39
	The Misanthrope	1568	Tempera on canvas	86 × 85	Museo di Capodimonte	MS 40
	The Beggars	1568	Oil on panel	18.5 × 21.5	Louvre	MS 41
	Parable of the Blind	1568	Tempera on canvas	85.5 × 154	Museo di Capodimonte	MS 42
	The Magpie on the Gallows	1568	Oil on panel	45.9 × 50.8	Hessisches Landesmuseum	MS 43
	The Three Soldiers	1568	Oil on panel	20.3 × 17.8	The Frick Collection	
	The Drunkard pushed into the Pigsty	1568	Oil on panel	18 cm. diam.	Private Collection (Sold at Christies in 2002)	
	The Storm at Sea (disputed attribution)	1569	Oil on panel	70.3 × 97	Kunsthistorisches Museum	MS 44

== Sources ==
- Rainer & Rose-Marie Hagen. Bruegel. Taschen. 1999. ISBN 978-0681406018
