= Naval Battle in the Gulf of Naples =

Painting by Pieter Bruegel the Elder

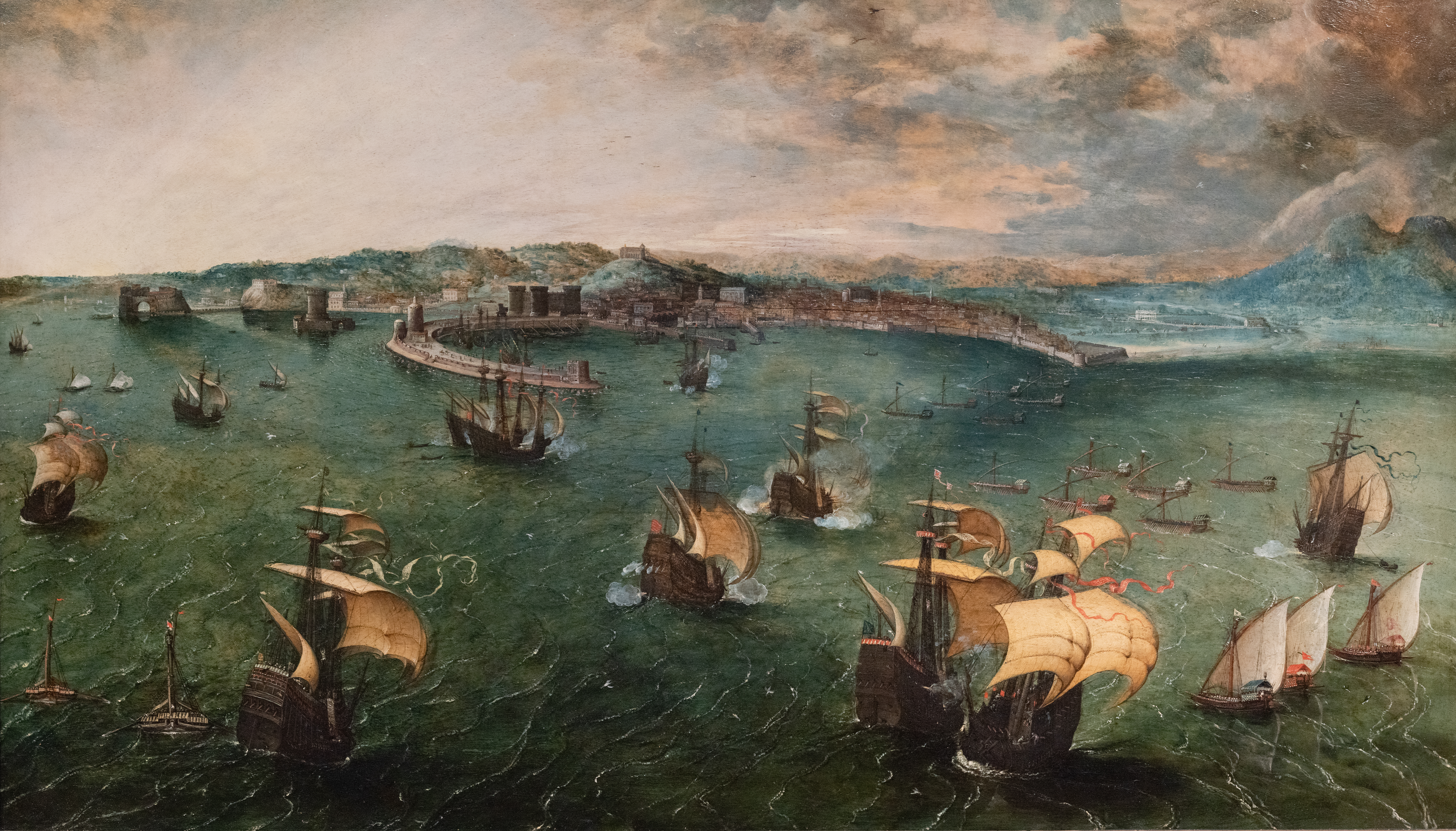
- Artist: Pieter Bruegel the Elder
- Year: 1558–1562
- Type: Oil on panel
- Dimensions: 42 cm × 71 cm (17 in × 28 in)
- Location: Doria Pamphilj Gallery, Rome

Naval Battle in the Gulf of Naples is an oil painting on panel by the Flemish Renaissance artist Pieter Bruegel the Elder, painted from 1558 to 1562. It is in the Doria Pamphilj Gallery in Rome.

== History and description ==
Bruegel traveled to the Italian Peninsula, with Abraham Ortelius, in 1551 and 1553. They stopped in Rome, Naples, and Messina. Many drawings were produced, including one depicting a naval confrontation in the Straits of Messina, which was turned into an engraving by Frans Huys. The veduta takes historical and topographical licenses: no such battle occurred in precisely this setting, nor does the harbor resemble Bruegel's depiction. The exact date of the composition is disputed; scholars do agree, however, that the volcano and its positioning seem to reflect Bruegel's neoplatonic pantheism.

In the foreground, a naval battle is perhaps taking place; it involves several vessels (sailing ships, galleys and smaller rowing boats), amidst puffs of smoke and barely legible trajectories of cannonballs, which make it difficult to unambiguously define the scene.

The background of the painting is the Gulf of Naples, with Mount Vesuvius visible at the right; it is depicted with a raised horizon, over half the painting, typical of the Flemish artists, which allows the view to have a particularly broad scope. Several monuments can be recognized: on the left, the remains of Castel dell'Ovo, the Castel Nuovo, the lost Torre San Vincenzo and the semicircular piers. The last detail is an imaginative creation of the artist, since in the topographical maps of the time the port appears to be rectangular in shape: this "softening" perhaps derives from his wish to make the view more elegant and dynamic.

== See also ==
- List of paintings by Pieter Bruegel the Elder
