= The Storm at Sea =

Painting attributed to Pieter Bruegel the Elder

Storm at Sea
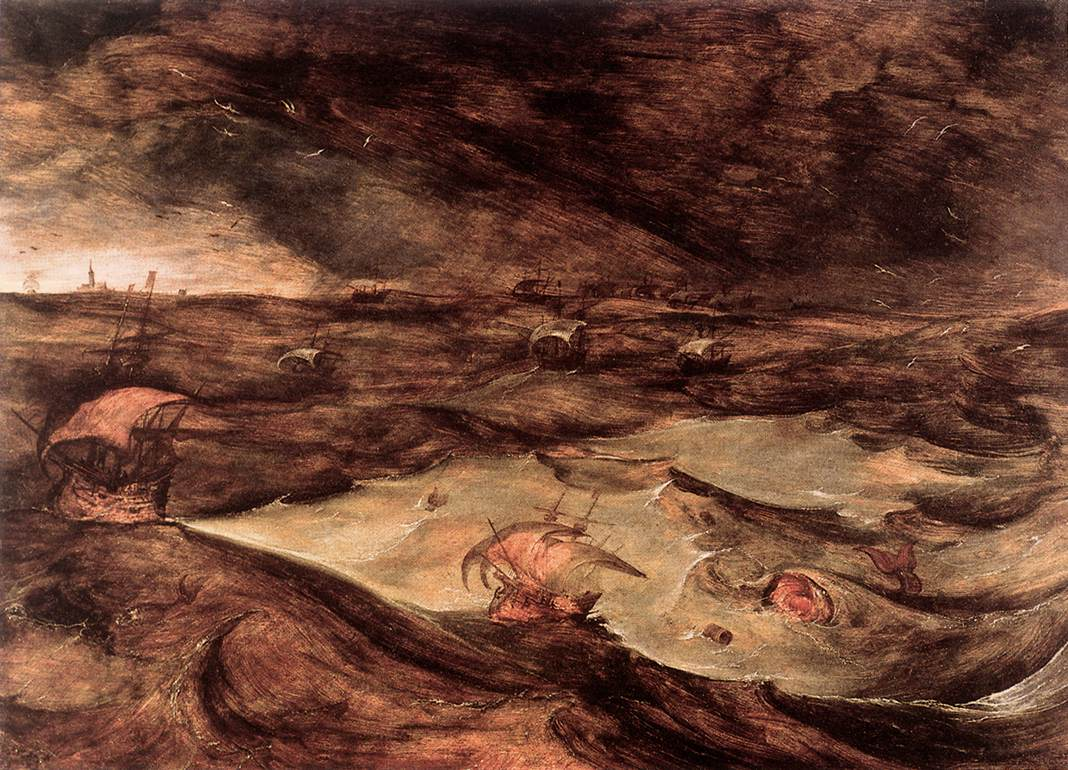
- Artist: Pieter Bruegel the Elder
- Year: c. 1569
- Type: Oil on panel
- Dimensions: 70.3 cm × 97 cm (27.7 in × 38 in)
- Location: Kunsthistorisches Museum, Vienna

Storm at Sea is an oil painting on panel attributed the Netherlandish Renaissance artist Pieter Bruegel the Elder, painted c. 1569. It is held in the Kunsthistorisches Museum, in Vienna.

== Description ==
In the past doubts have been raised about the attribution of this painting to Bruegel: the name of Joos de Momper, a landscape painter who became a master in the Antwerp guild in 1581, has been mentioned. However, not only is this painting superior to any by de Momper; its similarity to a drawing by Bruegel (in the Courtauld Institute of Art) and its originality of composition and delicacy of execution have made it generally accepted as a late work by Bruegel, possibly left unfinished at his death.

The prominence of the barrel and the whale has led the painting to be associated with the contemporary saying:

If the whale plays with the barrel that has been thrown to him and gives the ship time to escape, then he represents the man who misses the true good for the sake of futile trifles.

This sense would be underscored by the church outlined against the horizon, which stands for safety amid the storms of life.

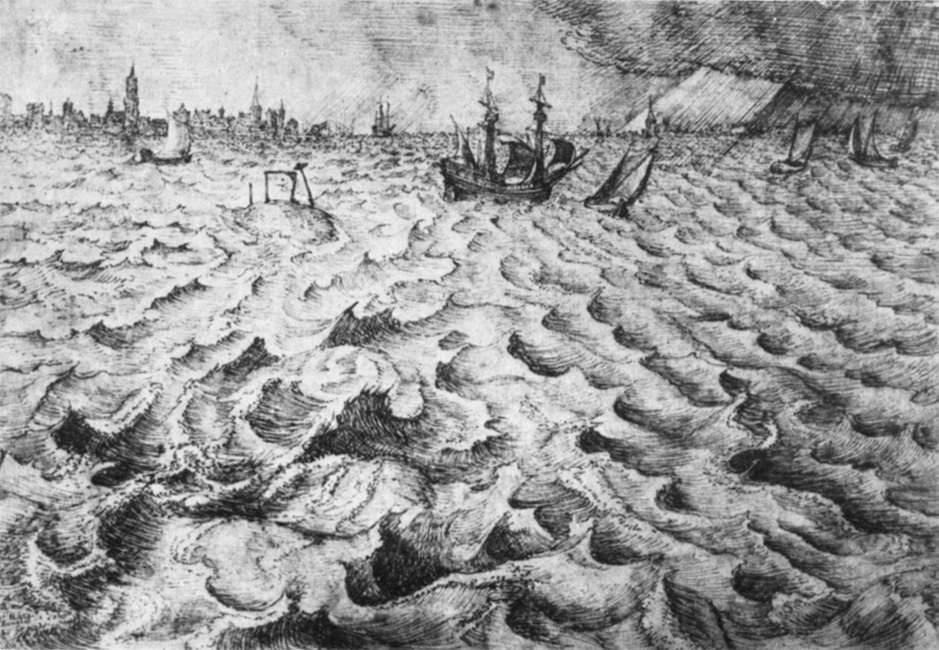
Seascape with a view of Antwerp, pen and brown ink drawing by Bruegel, in the Courtauld Institute of Art.

== See also ==
- List of paintings by Pieter Bruegel the Elder
