= The Peasant Dance =

Painting by Pieter Bruegel the Elder

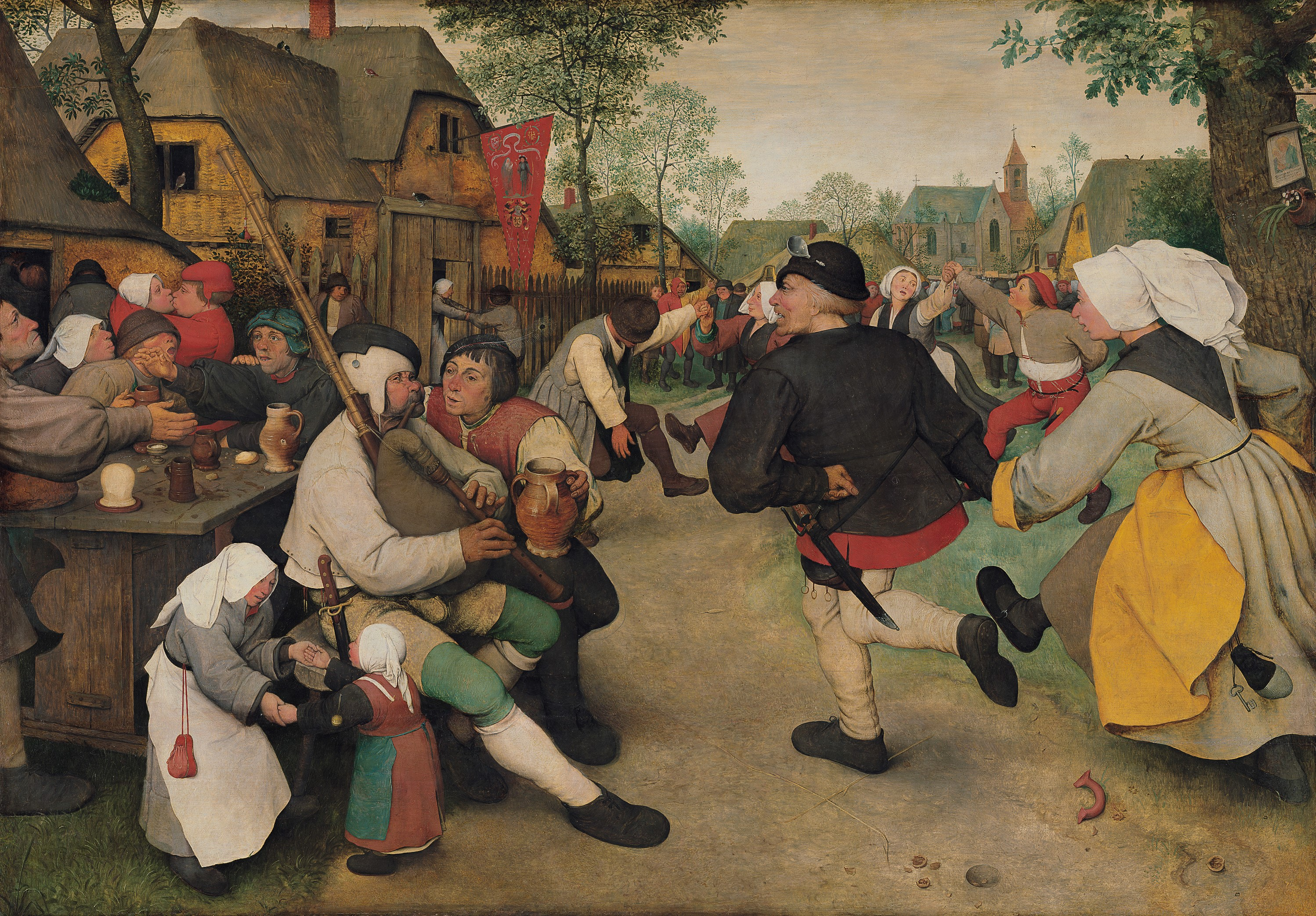
- Artist: Pieter Bruegel the Elder
- Year: 1567
- Type: Oil on panel
- Dimensions: 114 cm × 164 cm (45 in × 65 in)
- Location: Kunsthistorisches Museum, Vienna

The Peasant Dance (Dutch: De boerendans or De dorpskermis, lit. 'The Village Fair') is an oil-on-panel by the Netherlandish Renaissance artist Pieter Bruegel the Elder, painted in circa 1567. It was looted by Napoleon Bonaparte and brought to Paris in 1808, being returned in 1815. It is now in the Kunsthistorisches Museum in Vienna.

== Description ==
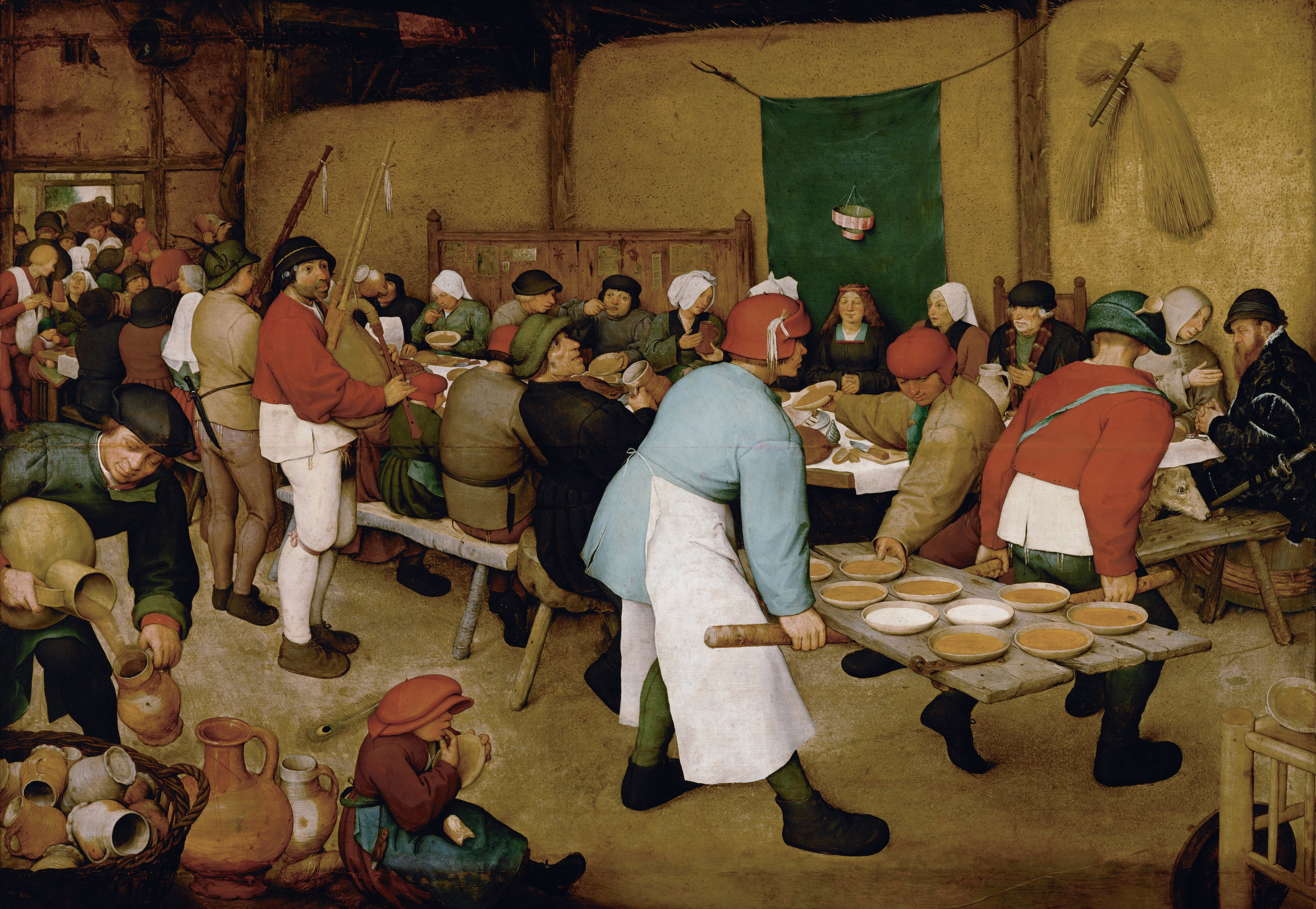
Peasant Wedding

The panel, neither signed nor dated, was painted circa 1567, at about the same time as The Peasant Wedding. The paintings are the same size and may have been intended as a pair or as part of a series illustrating peasant life. They are the two most outstanding examples of Bruegel's late style, which is characterized by his use of monumental Italianate figures.

=== Symbolism ===
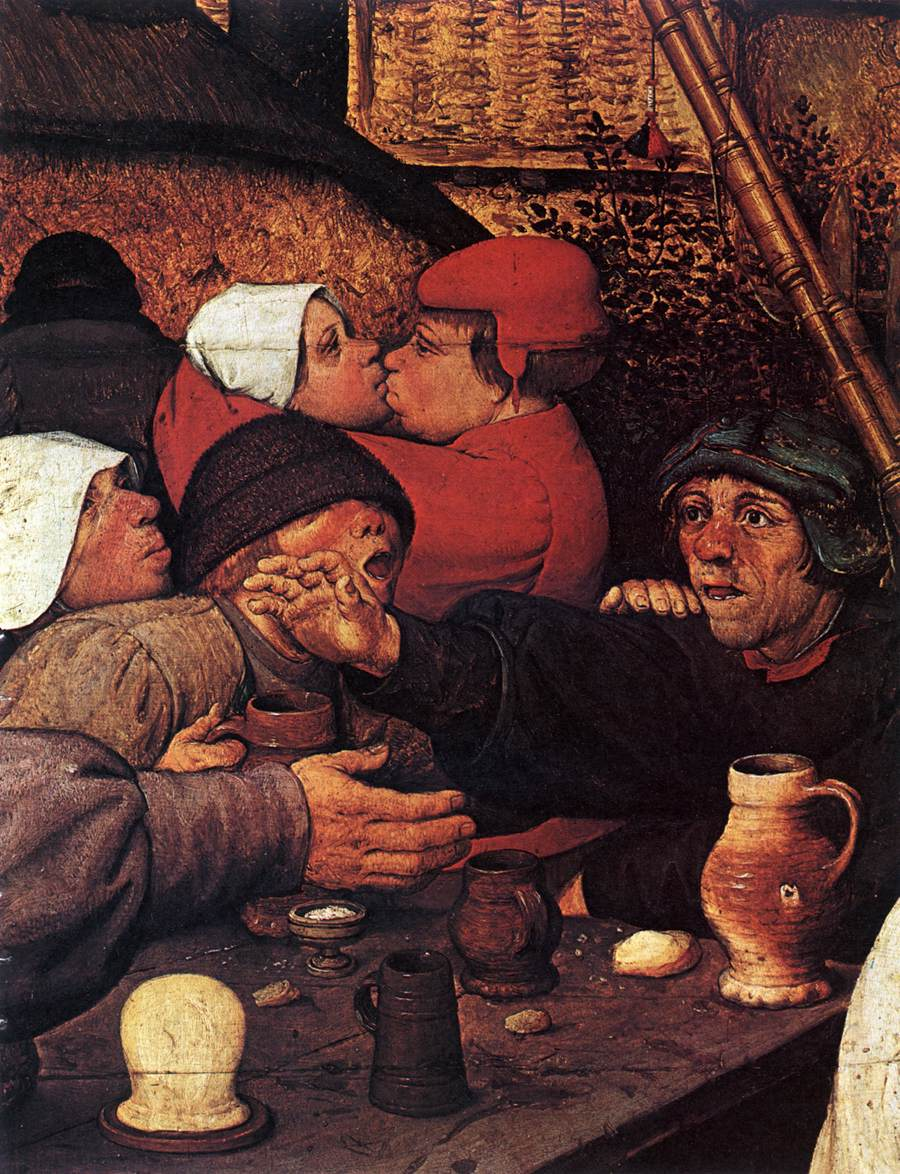
Detail from leftmost composition

Like The Peasant Wedding, it is likely that Bruegel intended this painting to have a moral sense rather than simply being an affectionate portrayal of peasant life. Gluttony, lust and anger can all be identified in the picture. The man seated next to the bagpipe player wears a peacock feather in his hat, a symbol of vanity and pride. The occasion for the peasants' revelry is a saint's day, but dancers turn their backs on the church and pay no attention whatsoever to the image of the Virgin Mary which hangs on the tree. The prominence of the tavern makes it clear that they are preoccupied with material rather than spiritual matters.

== Painting details ==
=== Reason and atmosphere ===
The scene depicted in this painting is of an annual festival that was celebrated on the feast day of the village patron saint, and the big red flag hanging from the building on the left indicates that the festival is dedicated to Saint George. The atmosphere of the painting mainly focuses on dancing, drinking, and music-making, creating a very fun and joyful feeling all around the painting.

=== Left side of the painting ===
On the left side of the painting, there are peasants sitting at a table with food and beer in front of the inn. There are a lot of interactions between the peasants there. They are either engaging with one another by inebriated exchange or physical affection towards one another.

=== Right side of the painting ===
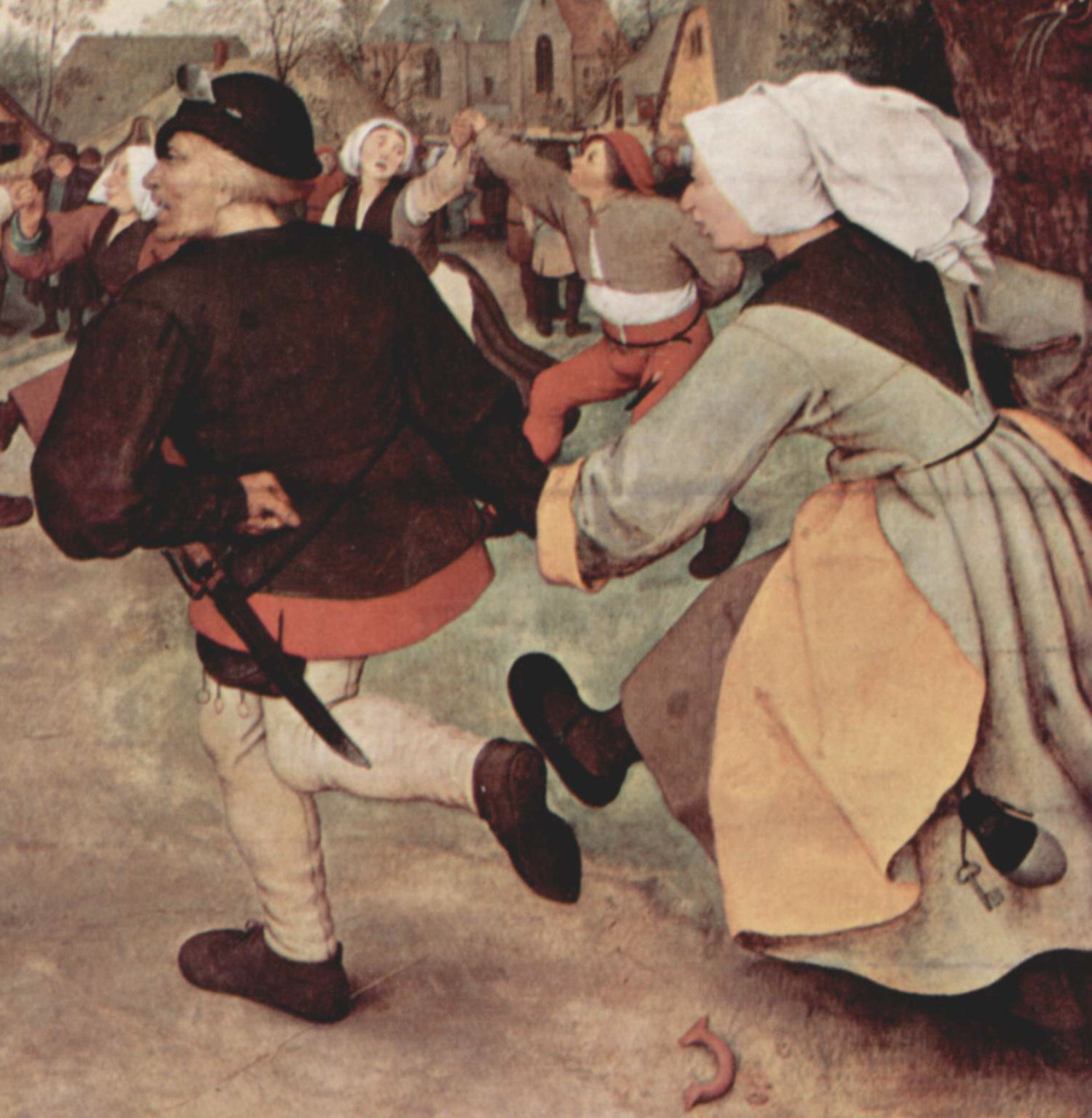
Detail from rightmost composition

On the right side of the painting, a couple is striding across the festival hand in hand within one another. Behind them in the middle ground, there are two other couples running together, hand in hand. The bagpiper is expanding his cheeks as he blows into the doedelzak (bagpipe), indicating the intensity of his tunes. The rough faces of all the figures painted in this art piece, particularly the large man in the center and those seated around the table, reveal teeth and facial expressions that visually communicate something of the unrefined or primitive quality of the peasant dance.

=== Emphasis of the figures in motion ===
The complex assembly of the figures on the right leads the beholder through a constellation of arms and legs; the couple's raised clasped hands in the middle ground form an arch that functions to both frame the recessional space below it as well as to echo and point towards the arches of the church in the background.

To the left of the central peasant dressed in black in the foreground, a second recessional corridor invites the viewer into the fictive space of the painting. There is a cascade of faces, beginning with the profile of the central figure, then that of a peasant woman, then a man from the city, finally leading to a smiling jester in the distance.

== See also ==
- List of paintings by Pieter Bruegel the Elder
