= Two Monkeys (Bruegel) =

Painting by Pieter Bruegel the Elder

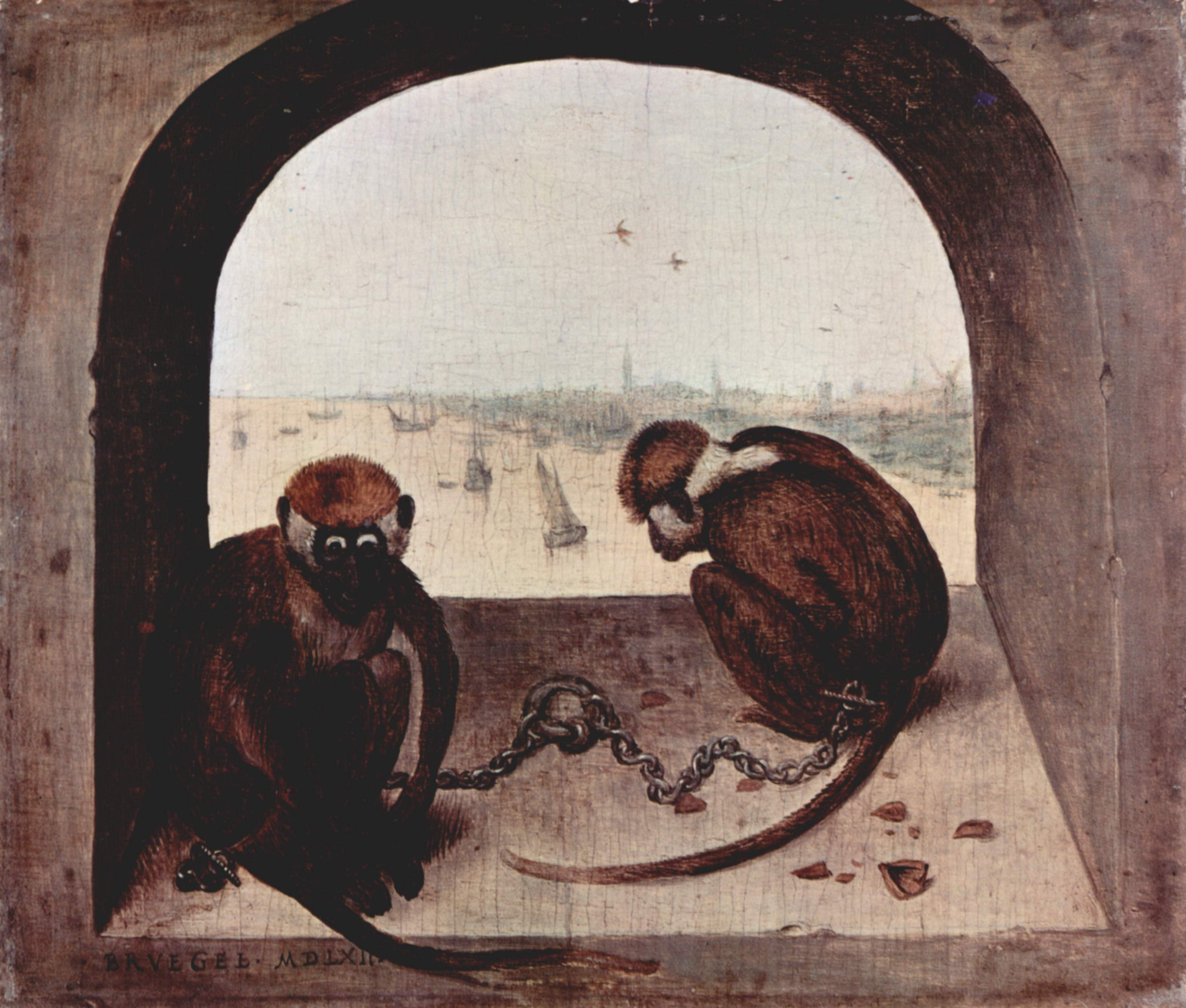
- Artist: Pieter Bruegel the Elder
- Year: 1562
- Medium: oil on oak wood panel
- Dimensions: 23 cm × 20 cm (9.1 in × 7.9 in)
- Location: Gemäldegalerie, Berlin State Museums, Berlin

Two Monkeys or Two Chained Monkeys is a 1562 painting by Dutch and Flemish Renaissance artist Pieter Bruegel the Elder. The work is now in the Gemäldegalerie (Painting Gallery) of the Berlin State Museums.

== Analysis ==
The painting depicts two monkeys shackled to an iron ring beneath an archway. Behind them, in the background, lies the city of Antwerp. The monkeys are red-capped mangabeys and, due to Antwerp's status as a port city, were probably taken from their natural habitat by animal traders.

Bruegel likely drew the symbol of two chained monkeys from Gentile da Fabriano's Adoration of the Magi. In that work, two monkeys are seen similarly chained under the central arc. Simultaneously paralleling and reinventing the meaning of the monkeys in Gentile's work, Bruegel used the chained monkeys to symbolize the follies of men and how they chain themselves and each other, according to art critic Kelly Grovier. Margaret A. Sullivan of Montana State University corroborates, stating that the two monkeys are seen as a "small allegory" of "foolish sinners, and their imprisonment is the result of an immoderate attitude towards material wealth." Specifically, Sullivan finds that the left monkey symbolizes avarice and greed while the right monkey represents prodigality. Sullivan drew these conclusions based on observations that Two Monkeys exhibits a "fundamental resemblance" to another of Bruegel's paintings, Dull Gret (Mad Meg).

== Exhibition ==
To mark the 450th anniversary of Bruegel's death, Two Monkeys, along with other works, was exhibited in Bruegel - The Hand of the Master in the Kunsthistorisches Museum, Vienna from October 2, 2018 – January 13, 2019. For the exhibition, the Gemäldegalerie performed an in-depth technical analysis of the painting from January–August 2017. Examination methods included tree-ring dating; stereomicroscope investigation; and UV radiation, X-ray imaging, infrared reflectography, and X-ray fluorescence analyses. As a result, museum restorer and copyist Bertram Lorenz was able to reconstruct the painting.

== Related works ==
Polish poet and Nobel Prize laureate Wisława Szymborska wrote the poem "Two Monkeys by Bruegel" describing her reaction to the painting.

== See also ==
- List of paintings by Pieter Bruegel the Elder
