= The Land of Cockaigne (Bruegel) =

Painting by Pieter Bruegel the Elder

- Luilekkerland (Dutch), Schlaraffenland (German)
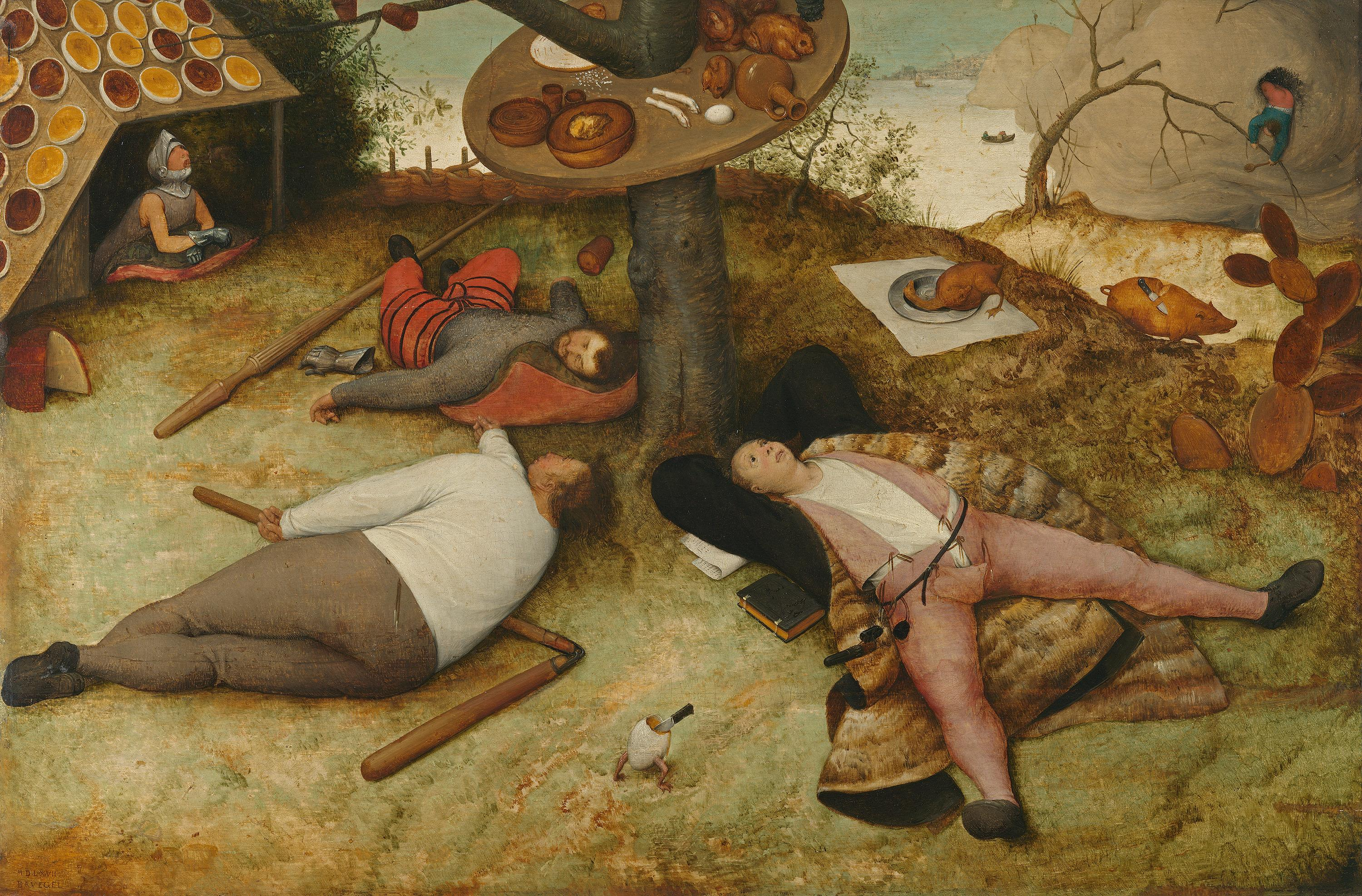
- Artist: Pieter Bruegel the Elder
- Year: 1567
- Medium: Oil on panel
- Dimensions: 52 cm × 78 cm (20 1/2 in × 31 in)
- Location: Alte Pinakothek, Munich

Het Luilekkerland (Dutch, "Cockaigne", literally "The Lazy-Tasty Land") – known in English as The Land of Cockaigne – is a 1567 oil painting by the Netherlandish Renaissance artist Pieter Bruegel the Elder (c. 1525–1569). In medieval times, Cockaigne was a mythical land of plenty, but Bruegel's depiction of Cockaigne and its residents is not meant to be a flattering one. He chooses rather a comic illustration of the spiritual emptiness believed to derive from gluttony and sloth, two of the seven deadly sins.

== Description ==
In the painting, a clerk, a peasant, and a soldier lie dozing on the ground underneath a table bound to a tree. The clerk's book, papers, ink and pen lie idle, as do the peasant's flail and the soldier's lance and gauntlet. A half-eaten egg in its shell runs between the peasant and the clerk. The table attached to the tree is laden with partly consumed food and drink. Behind the tree, a roasted fowl lays itself upon a silver platter, implying that it is ready to be eaten, and a roasted pig runs about with a carving knife already slipped under its skin. On the left, a knight emerges from a lean-to whose roof is covered in dishes of pie and pastry, with an open mouth, waiting for a roasted pigeon to fly in (the pigeon was accidentally removed during restoration work). On the right and behind the main action, a man clutching a spoon forces his way out of a large cloud of pudding, having eaten his way through it; he reaches for the bent branch of a tree in order to lower himself into Cockaigne. The fence enclosing the main scene behind the dozing trio is made of interwoven sausages. A partly eaten wheel of cheese and a bush (or tower) of loaves of bread are on the left and right of the scene, respectively.

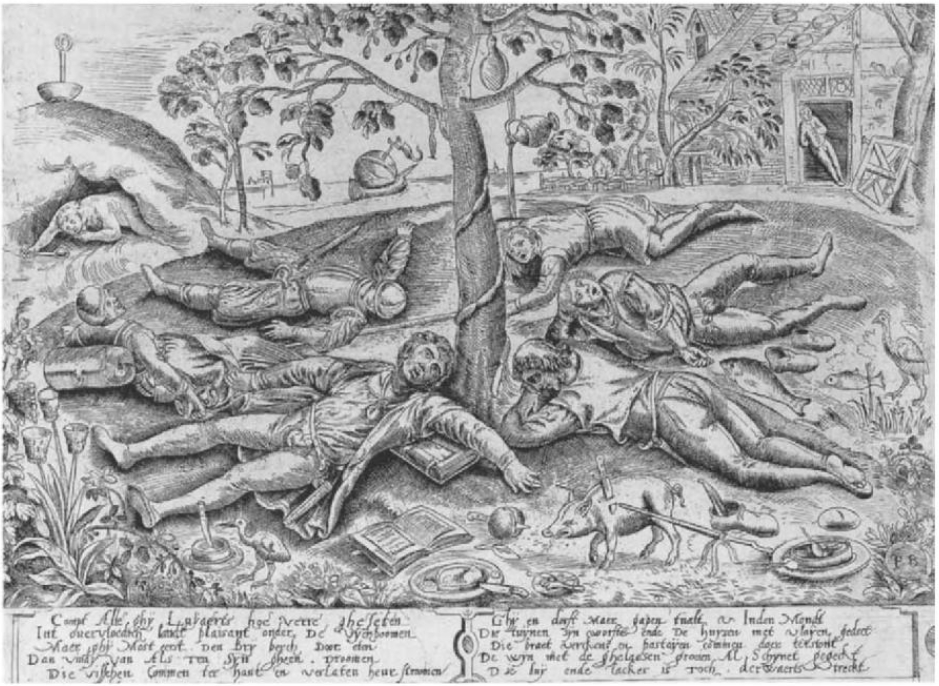
The print by Pieter Balten that inspired Bruegel (ca. 1560)

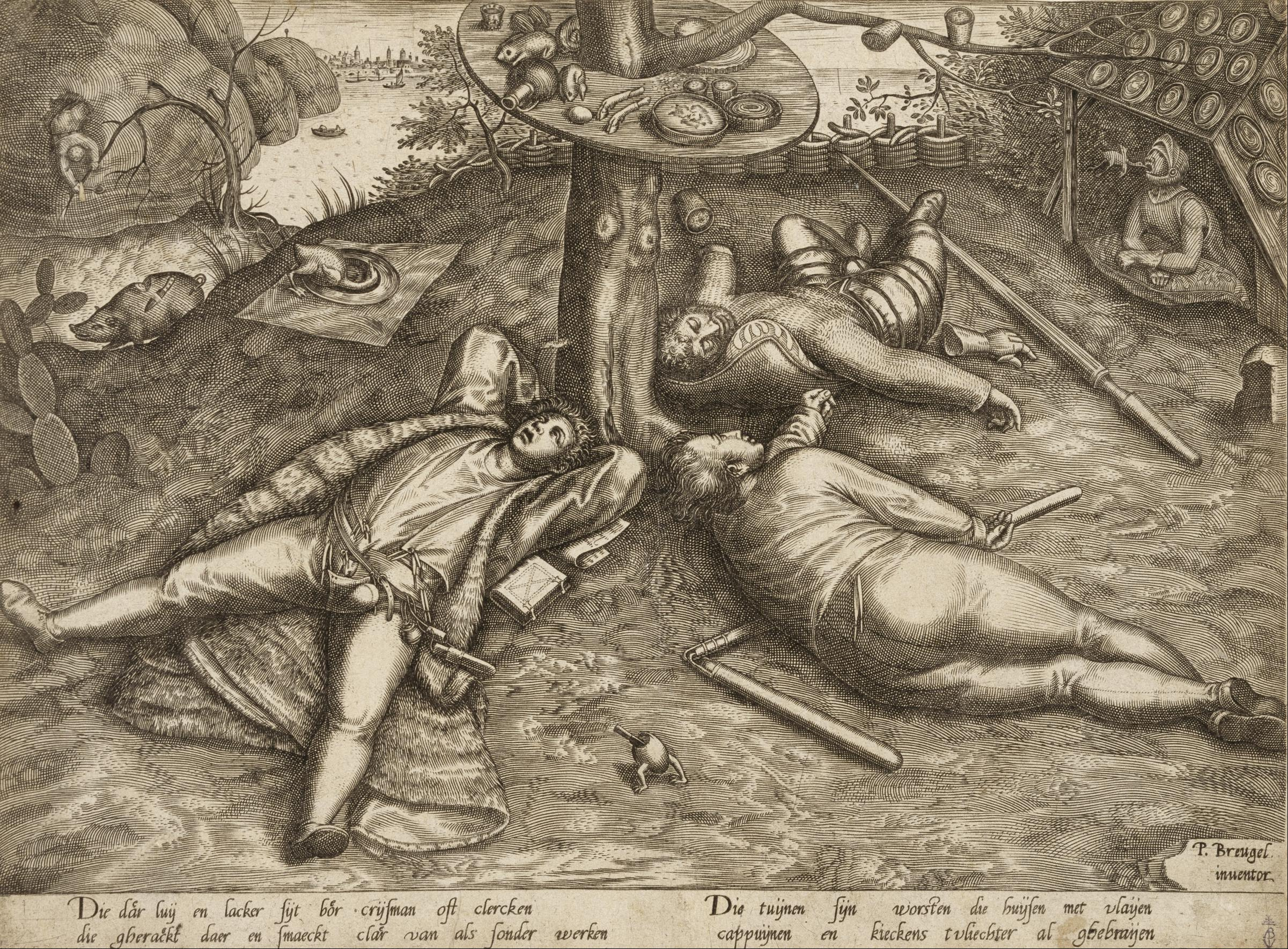
The copy attributed to Pieter van der Heyden (with flying bird)1525/1575

Proverbs:

- There the roofs are covered with pies (there is abundance)
- Grabbing the hen's egg and letting the goose egg go (making the bad choice)
- The pig has been stabbed through the belly (it's a done deal)
- Put a spoke in the wheel (deliberately obstruct)
- To put in armor (to be angry)
- Armed to the teeth (determined in approach)
- To be caught between heaven and earth (to be in a difficult position)

sleeping farmer in The Harvesters (1565)

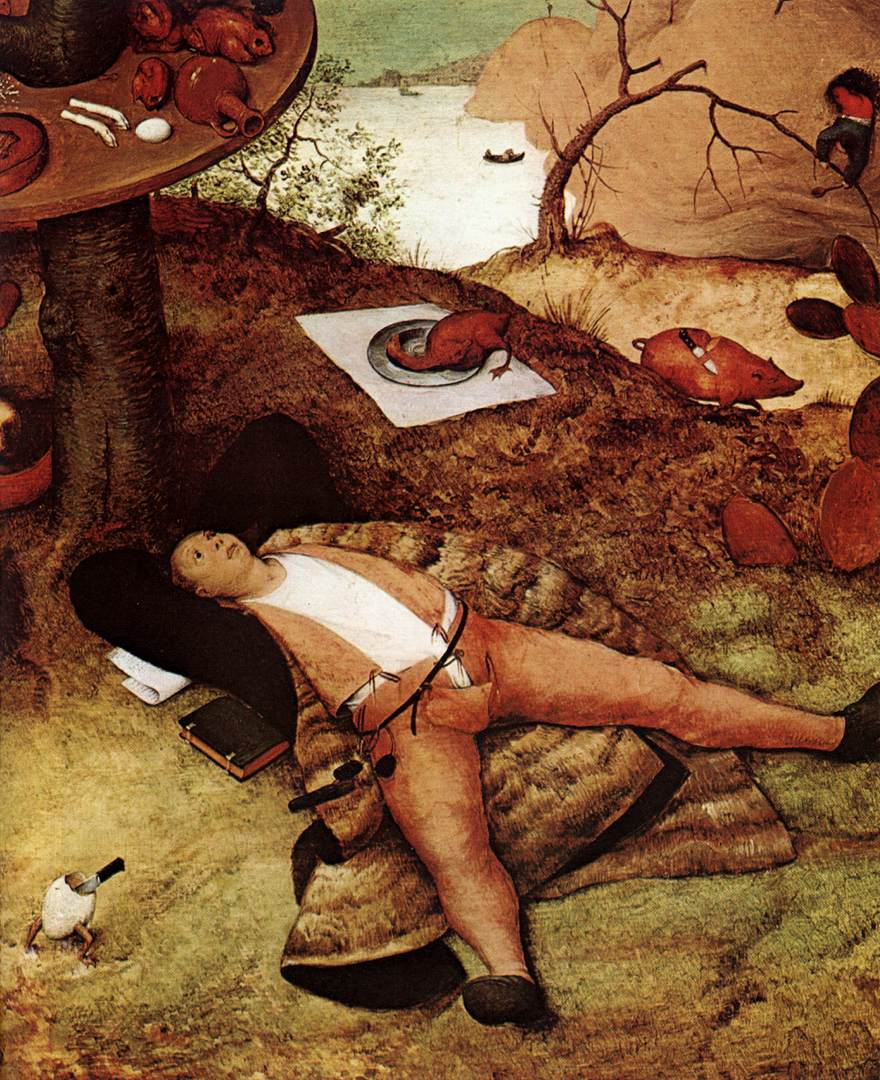
the scholar, in the same pose as the sleeping farmer in The Harvesters (1565)

== Interpretation ==
The arrangement of the clerk, peasant, and soldier underneath the tree suggests the men as the spokes of a wheel, where the tree is the hub. The roasted fowl lies in the place where a fourth spoke could be.

Ross Frank has argued that the painting is a political satire directed at the participants in the first stages of the Dutch Revolt (1568–1648), where the roasted fowl represents the humiliation and failure of the Nobility (who would otherwise form the fourth spoke of the wheel) in their leadership of the Netherlands, and the overall scene depicts the complacency of the Netherlandish people, too content with their abundance to take the risks that would bring about significant religious and political change.

The painting has also been cited as illustrating the Freudian oral stage of psychosexual development, showing a paradise of oral pleasure. It is used to demonstrate how human beings achieve oral pleasure and stimulation from eating and simply having things in the mouth.

== See also ==
- List of paintings by Pieter Bruegel the Elder
