= The Fall of the Rebel Angels =

Painting by Pieter Bruegel the Elder

- La chute des anges rebelles (French), De val van de opstandige engelen (Dutch)
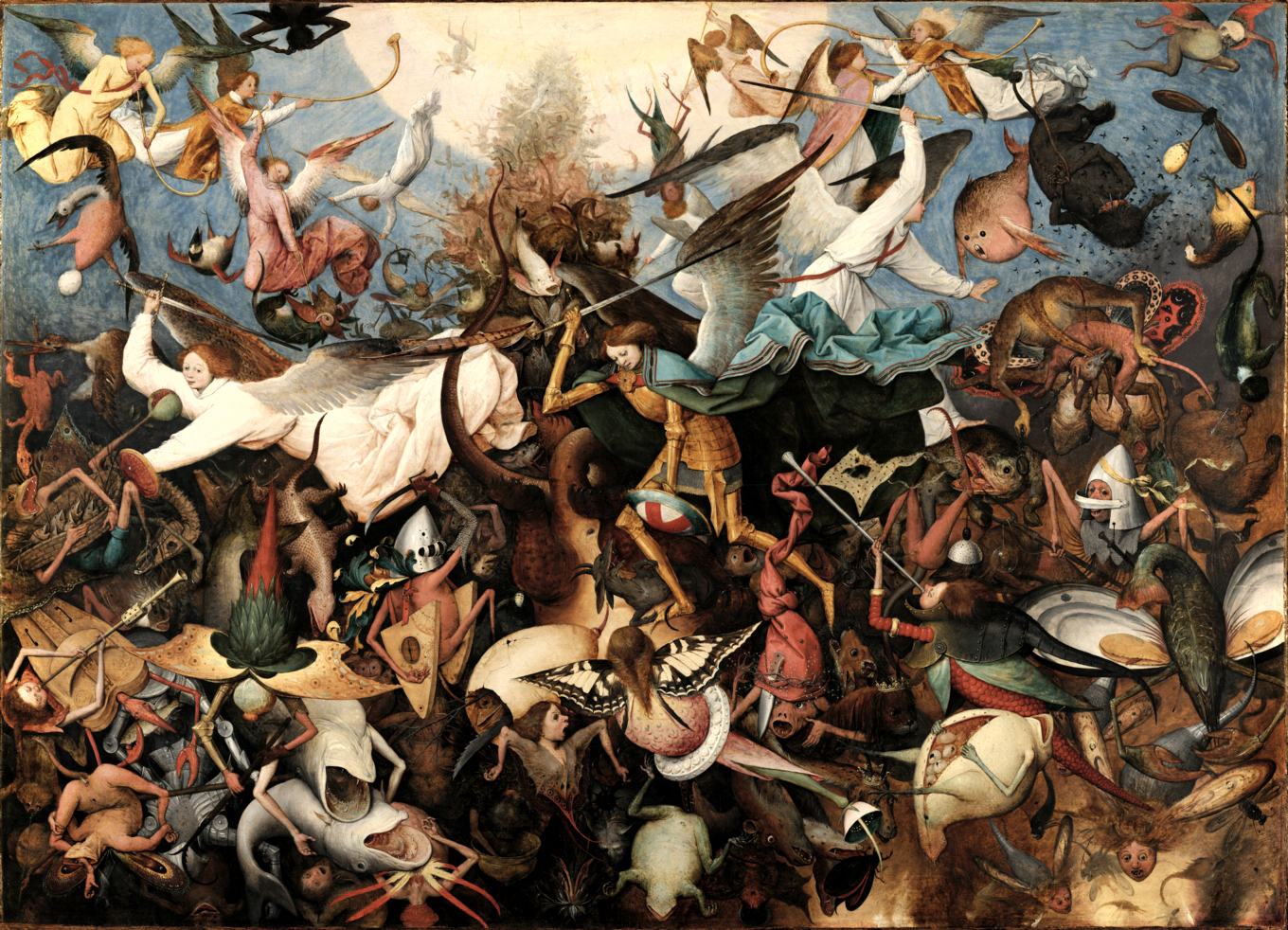
- Artist: Pieter Bruegel the Elder
- Year: 1562
- Type: Oil on oak panel
- Dimensions: 117 cm × 162 cm (46 in × 64 in)
- Location: Royal Museums of Fine Arts of Belgium; Brussels
- Accession: Inv. 584
- Website: https://fine-arts-museum.be/fr/la-collection/pieter-i-bruegel-la-chute-des-anges-rebelles?string=Bruegel+

The Fall of the Rebel Angels is an oil-on-panel painting of 1562 by the Netherlandish Renaissance artist Pieter Bruegel the Elder. The painting is 117cm x 162cm (46 inches by 64 inches) and is now in the Oldmasters Museum (part of the Royal Museums of Fine Arts of Belgium) in Brussels, Belgium. The Fall of Rebel Angels depicts Lucifer along with the other fallen angels that have been banished from heaven. Angels are falling from the sun in a stacked manner along with ungodly creatures that Bruegel created.

Bruegel's painting was previously thought to be by Hieronymus Bosch. Bruegel was influenced by a variety of artists such as Albrecht Dürer, Frans Floris I, and Hieronymus Bosch. He also got ideas for the creation of his creatures in his previous works.

== Description ==
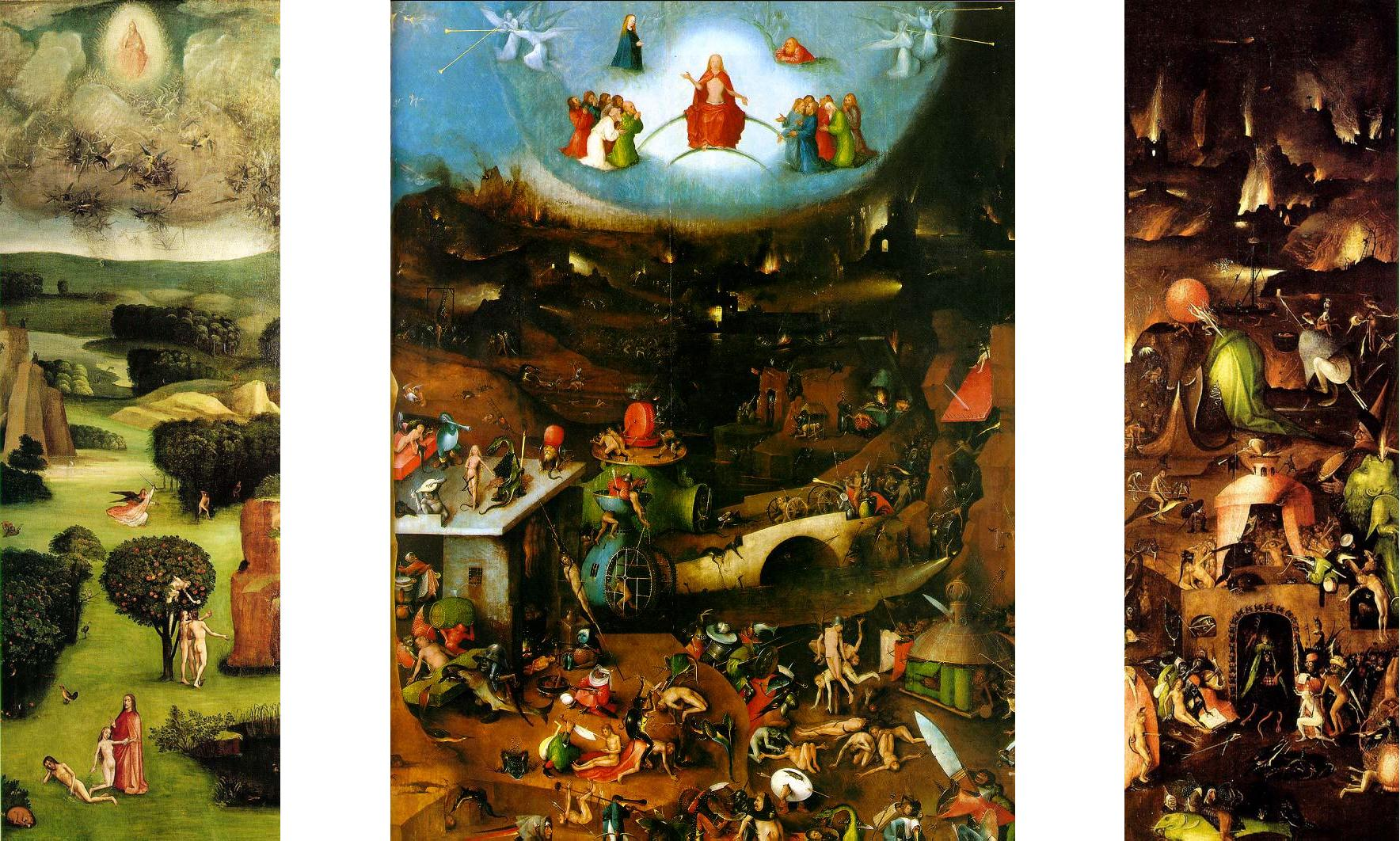
The Last Judgement, by Hieronymus Bosch, Vienna

Painted in 1562, Bruegel's depiction of this subject of Lucifer falling with his fallen angels is taken from a passage from Revelation 12, and reveals the artist's profound debt to Hieronymus Bosch. This is shown through the grotesque, ugly or distorted, figures painted as half-human and half-apocalyptic creatures.

Lucifer was designed to be a perfect angel. He fell from heaven because of his pride and rebellion against God's divine plan, which was to appoint Jesus as the people's savior. Lucifer coerced one-third of the angels to follow his lead in the rebellion and to assist in appointing him to be the new "God." The sin of pride caused the fall of Lucifer and his companions and resulted in the "war in heaven." The archangel Michael was given the duty to drive Lucifer and the fallen angels out of heaven. The conflict of good and evil as well as vice and virtue are constant recurring themes throughout Bruegel's work.

The composition with a central figure placed among many smaller figures was favored by Bruegel during this time. This is not only shown through The Fall of Rebel Angels but through art pieces such as Dulle Griet and in the series of engravings of the Vices and the Virtues completed for the Antwerp publisher Hieronymus Cock.

The painting is a split landscape with the top portion being heaven and the bottom portion representing hell. Heaven is illustrated with light blues, vibrant colors, and surrounded by flying angels, while hell is much darker than heaven. This is illustrated through dark tones and demonic creatures to set the distinct difference between the two. The entire space is filled and little absent space is present.

=== Figures ===
The central figure is the archangel Michael depicted with a sword. He is in triumph as he defeats the fallen angels and demonic creatures. Above the archangel, there are figures coming out of what looks like a hole in the sky which is the sun. The figures represent Lucifer, the fallen angels, and demonic creatures. There are also an abundance of exotic animals alongside deformed and mutated figures. There are two other prominent figures on either side of archangel Michael who are dressed in all white to contrast the dark colors underneath them. These figures are good angels who are assisting in the fight against the rebellious angels. In the upper portion in both corners, there are angelic musicians playing their instruments as if the war between good and evil has already been played out. The action of playing the trumpets foreshadow a successful triumph.

== Attribution Debate ==
Due to not finding a signature on the painting, the Royal Museum of Fine Arts first inherited the painting with the idea that the artist of the painting was Hieronymus Bosch. The signature was found under the frame in 1900 with the name of Pieter Bruegel on it. With this finding, they assumed the painting came from Pieter the Younger. Later, after finding a date on the painting, it was clarified that the artist was not Pieter the Younger but Pieter Bruegel the Elder.

== Influences ==
The Garden of Earthly Delights by Hieronymus Bosch

Bruegel had multiple inspirations for the creation of The Fall of Rebel Angels, including Albrecht Dürer, Frans Floris I, Hieronymus Bosch and past works of Bruegel himself. Dürer's woodcut series of the Apocalypse, specifically Saint Michael Fighting the Dragon, is theorized to provide an insight on the position of the archangel Michael as a central figure standing on the dragon with a sword to the body of the dragon. Frans Floris I has created his own Fall of Rebel Angels consisting of monster heads on human nude bodies which called for a comparison between his and Bruegel's work. Bruegel made his own images with the same monstrous component of different heads on different figures. Hieronymus Bosch was the main influencer to Bruegel's work. Bosch's The Garden of Earthly Delights triptych portrays hybrid creatures and explored the idea of vices and virtues as well as good vs evil. The hybrid creatures are depicted on the far right side of the triptych with the hellish dark scenery. Bosch's The Last Judgement has also influenced Bruegel's work.

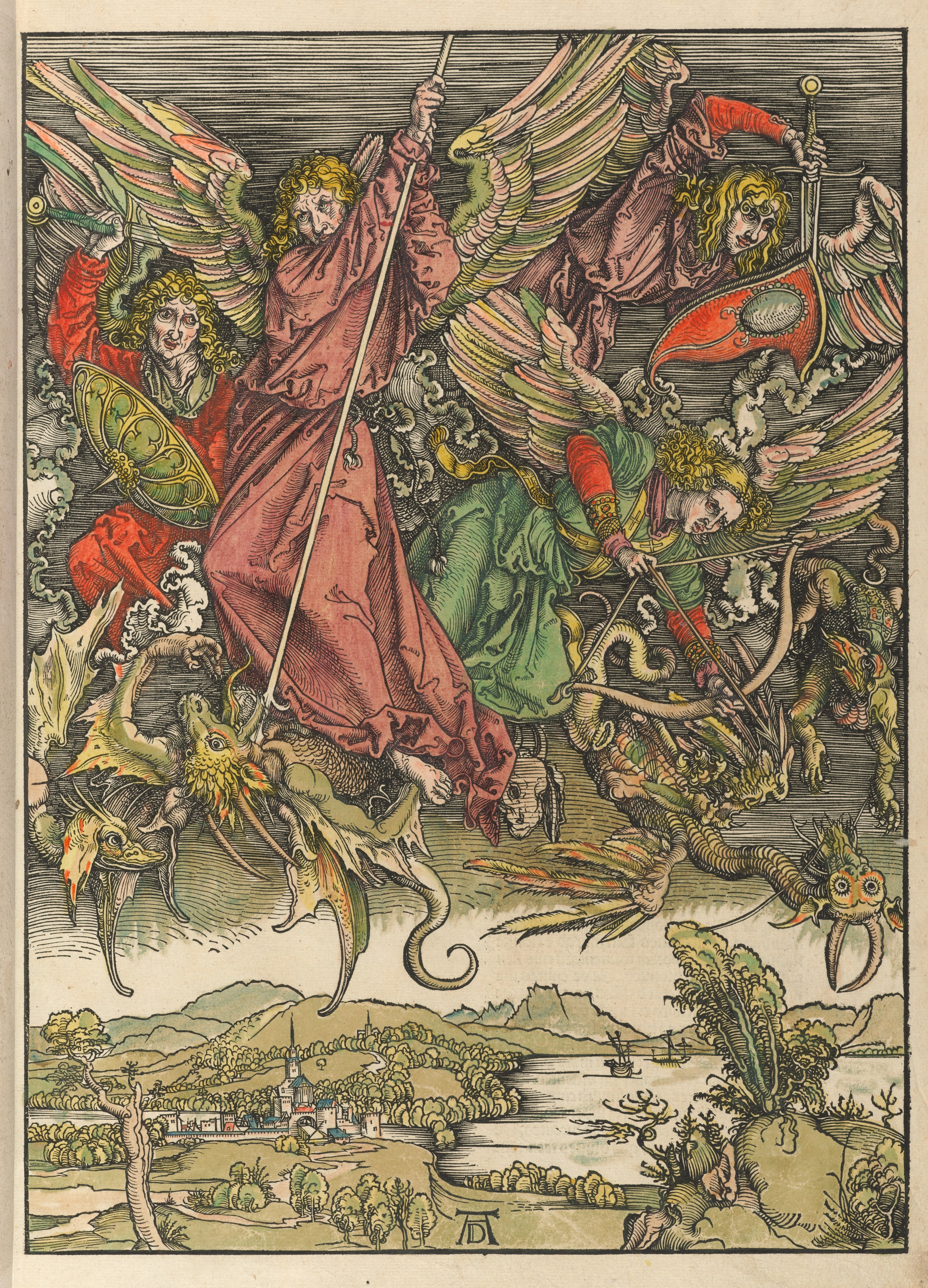
Saint Michael Fighting the Dragon, woodcut by Albrecht Dürer, with later colouring

On the far left part of the triptych, Bosch has his version of the fallen rebel angels falling from the sky. Bruegel enlarges the scene and has the subject of the fallen angels as his main focus. Ultimately, Bruegel was known as a "second Bosch" or an "imitator" of Bosch because of the similar techniques and concepts they used. Both Bosch and Bruegel first sketched with a brush, then applied a thin layer of pigment, and later continued to add layers. Their techniques were so similar that in many cases, it was hard to differentiate who painted a piece. The drawing done by Bruegel in 1558 of The Last Judgement was the source for the angelic musicians in The Fall of Rebel Angels. The angel figures with the trumpets in this painting are thought to be siblings to the angels in the drawing. The Mad Meg(Dulle Griet) by Bruegel was created in the same year with the same concept of distorted hellish figures. Towards the bottom there is a fish with a human leg coming out of it which is similar to the figure with a human head on an animal's body in The Fall of Rebel Angels.

== Interpretation ==
There has been a comparison between this art work and cabinets of curiosities. Because this painting is so full and depicted with natural and artificial objects, Tine Luk Meganck states this is Bruegel's own cabinet of curiosity portrayed as an art piece. Bruegel utilizes natural objects such as a butterfly, fish, and other known creatures. He also uses artificial objects such as the instruments, armor, and weapons. The incorporation of both natural and artificial objects reflect his stance on how he feels about the new found foreign land of the Americas.

== In popular culture ==
A reproduction of the painting appears at the beginning of the music video for the Korean version of the song Blood Sweat & Tears by South Korean group BTS. As the group somewhat cheerfully walks through a museum, member Jin stops in front of the painting and observes it briefly with a more serious demeanor, at which point the song begins.

The painting was also featured in a collaboration between Supreme and Undercover, a Japanese clothing brand by Jun Takahashi. The collection released during the Fall/Winter 2016 season and featured the painting on an all-over-print jacket and a sticker.

The painting is featured in the show Interview with the Vampire as a puzzle that the character Daniel Molloy works on in the pilot episode, and serves as foreshadowing for the series.

== Gallery ==
Details

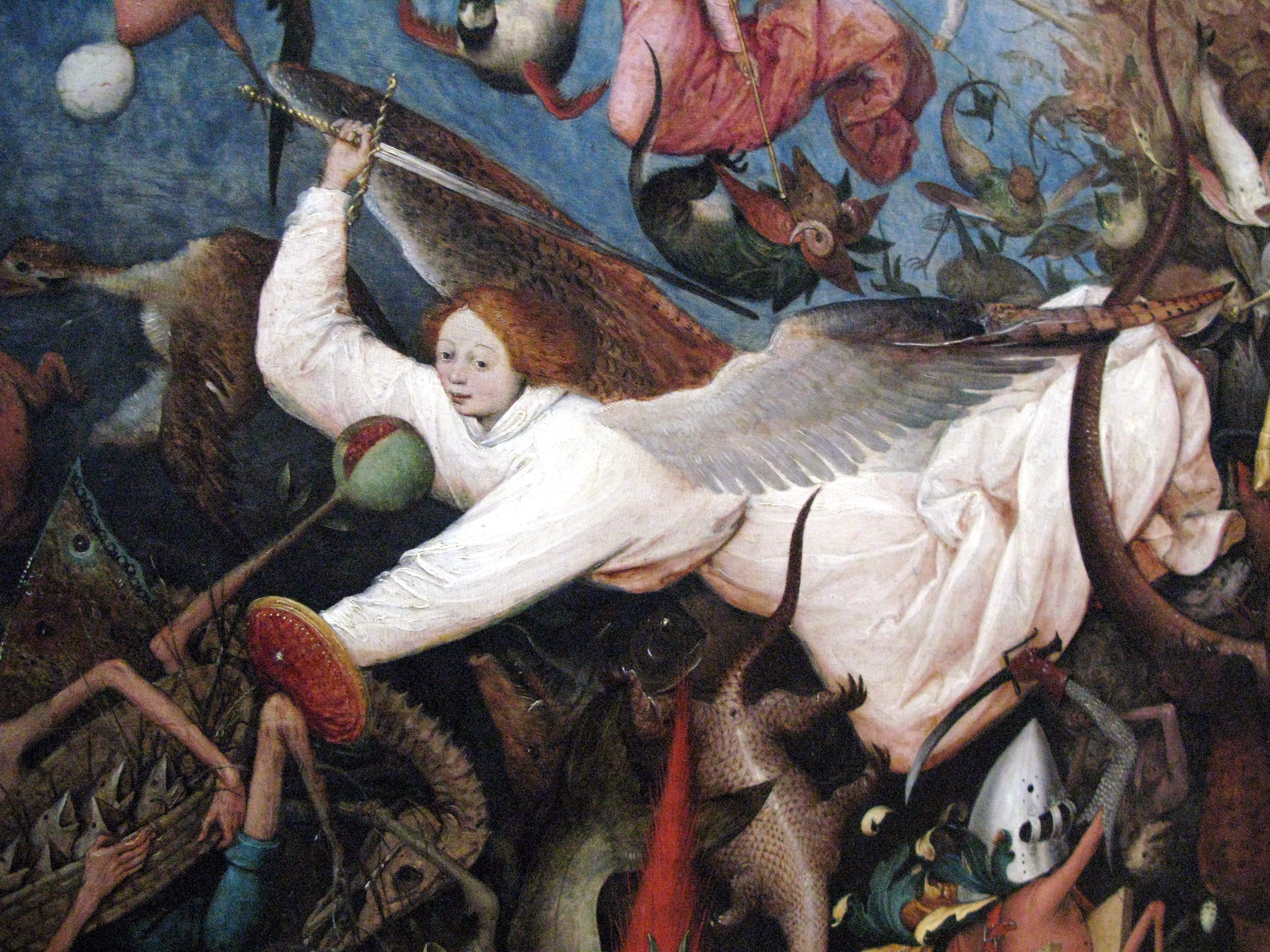
A Good Angel Fighting the Rebels

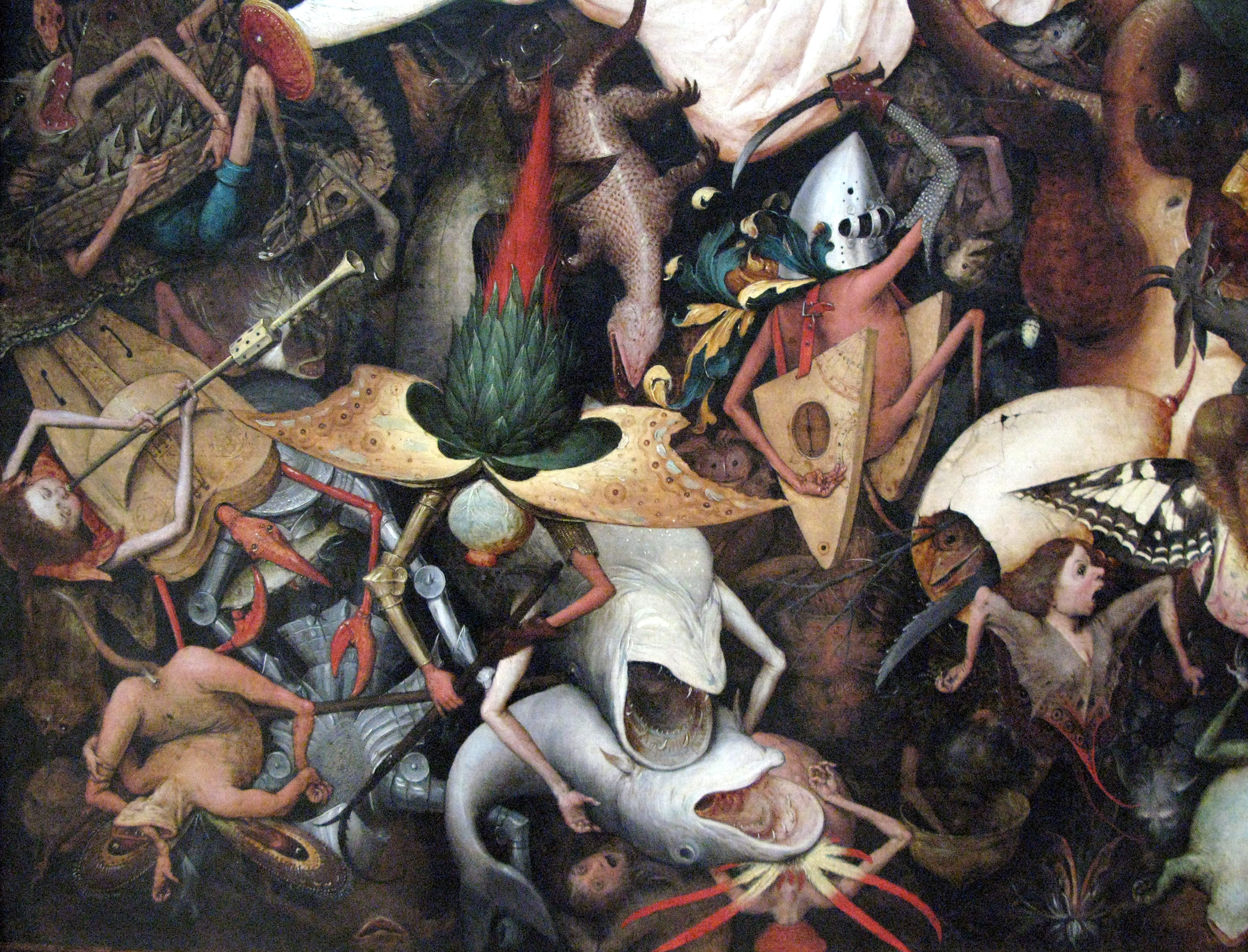
The Fallen Angels

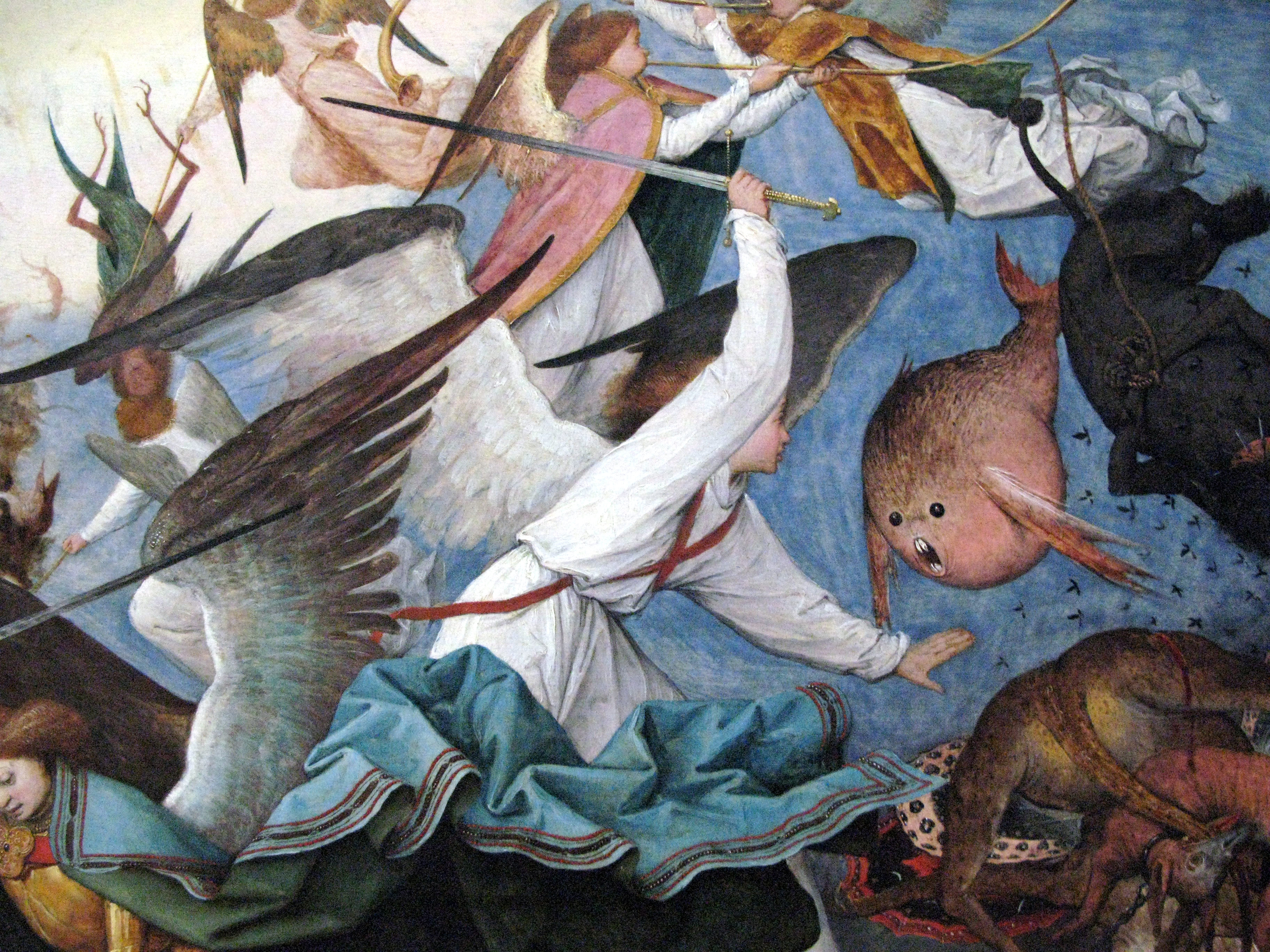
A Good Angel Fighting the Rebels

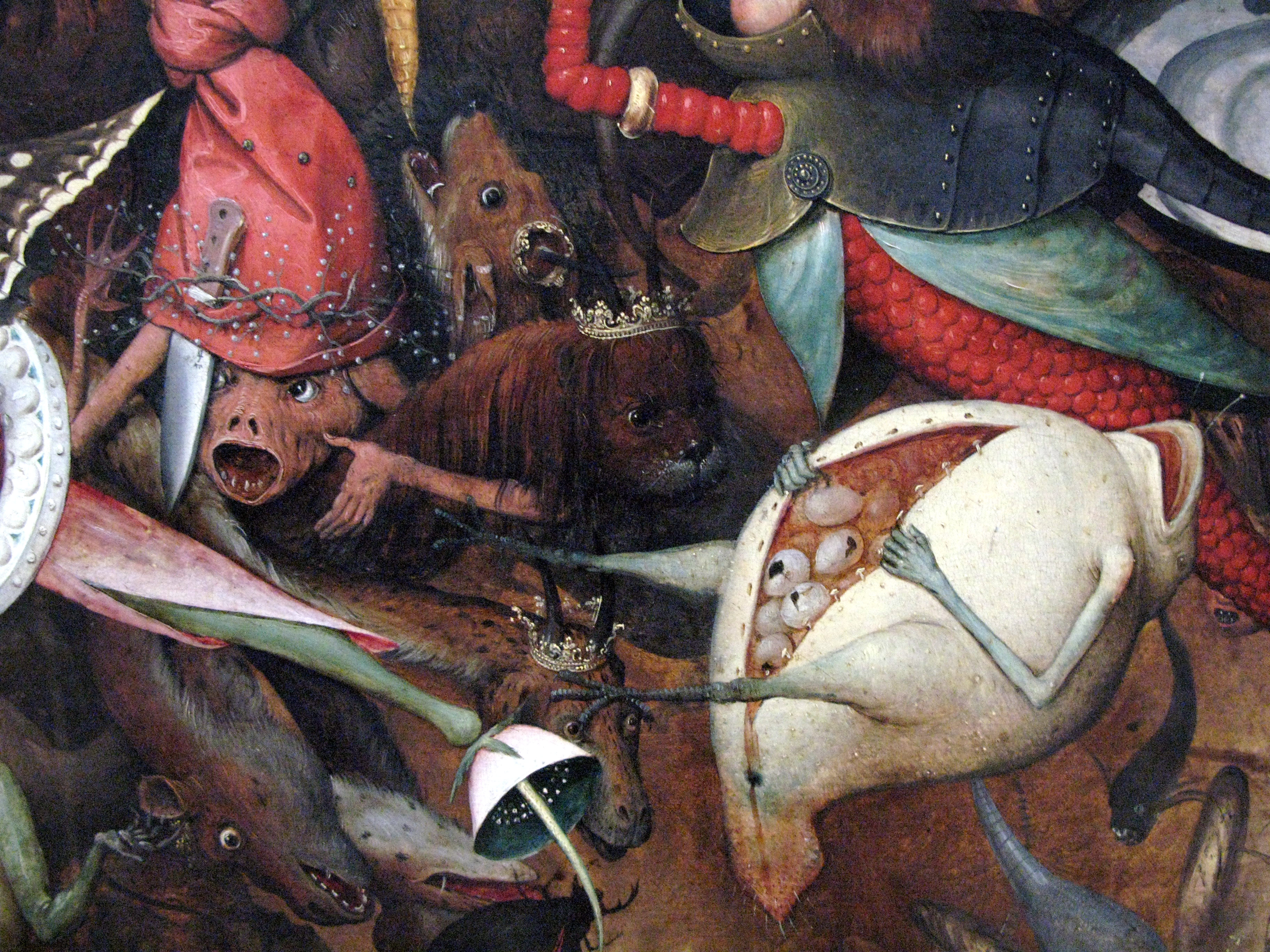
Monstrous Demons

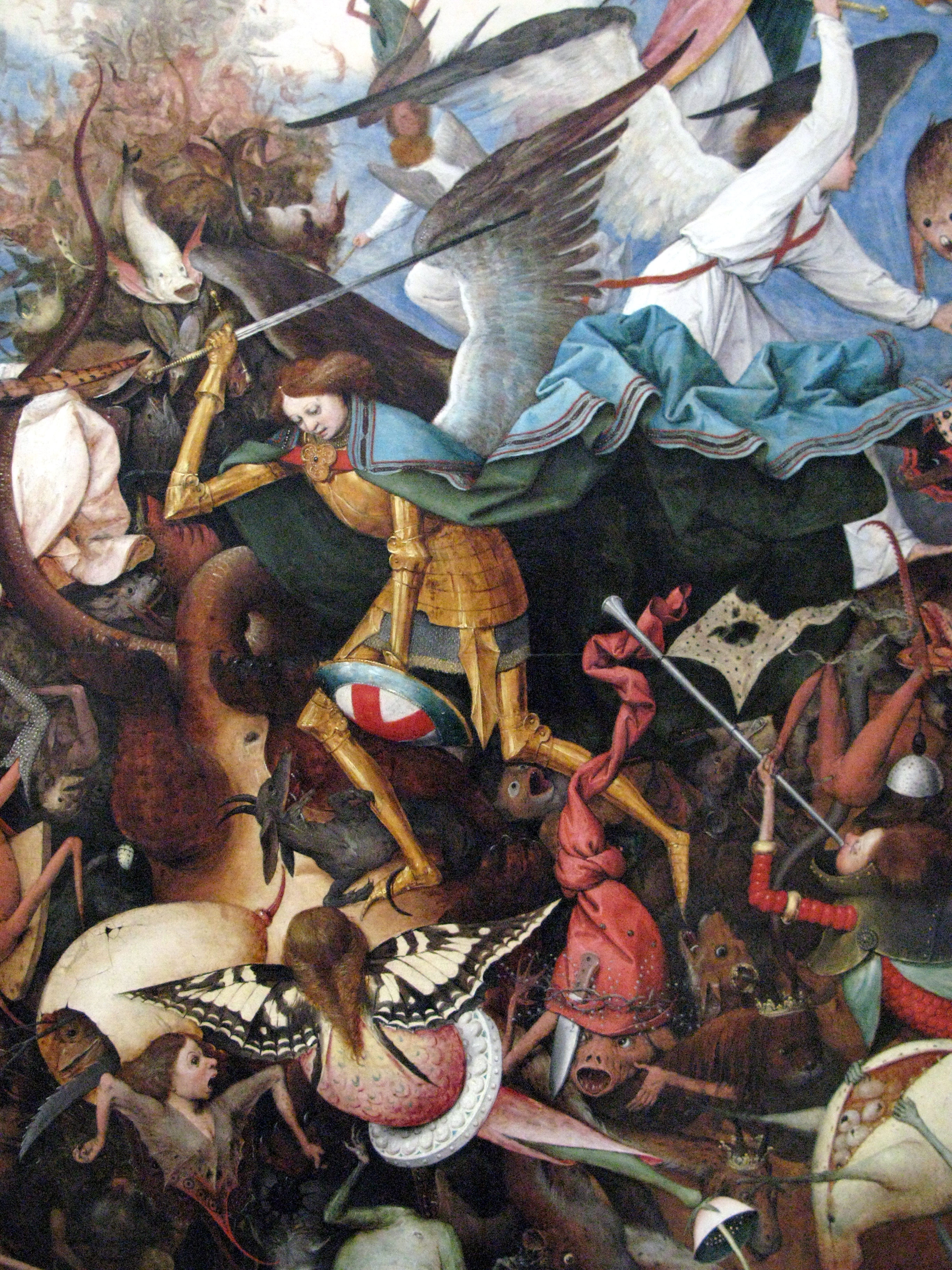
The Archangel Michael

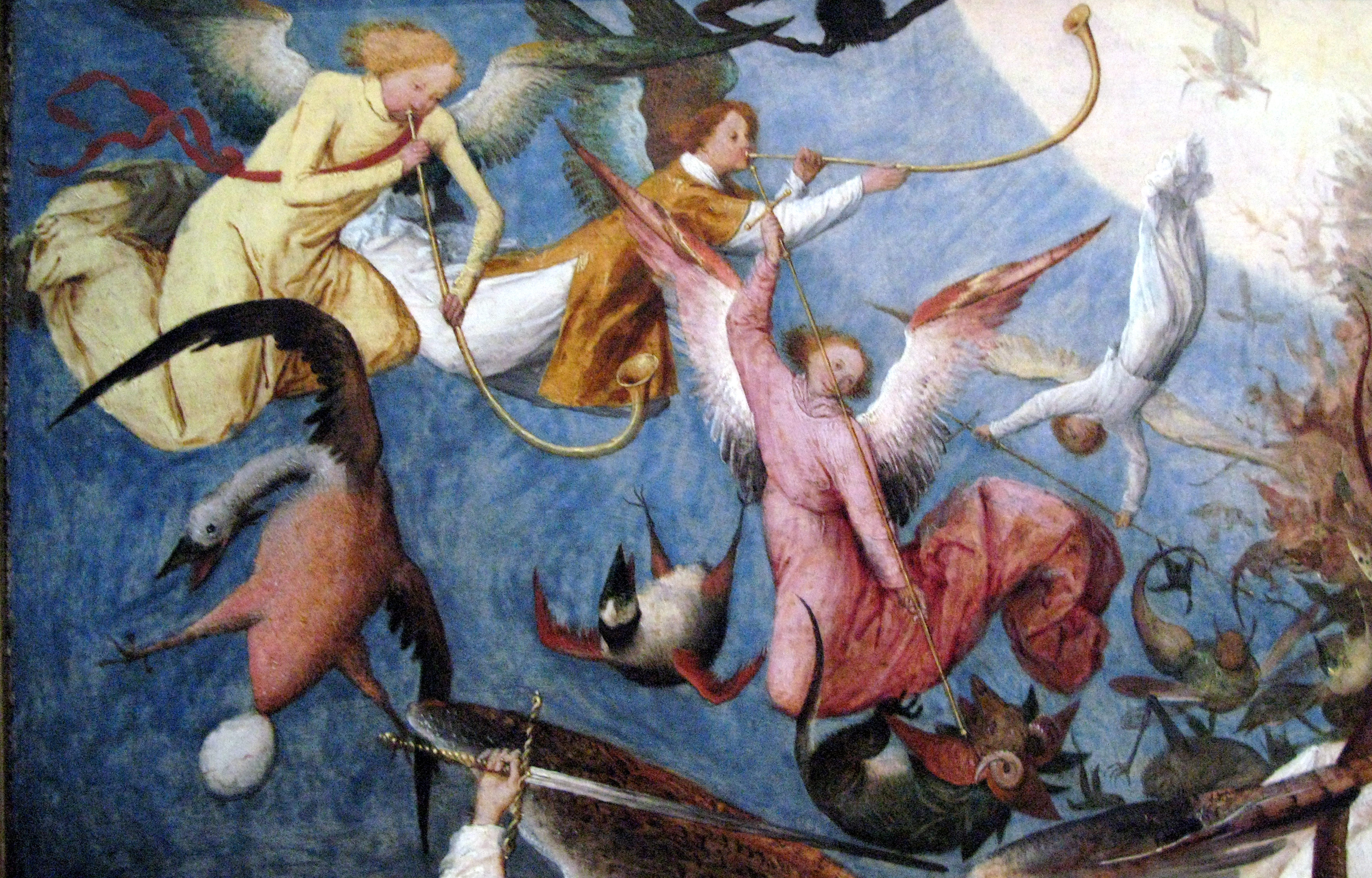
Angelic Musicians

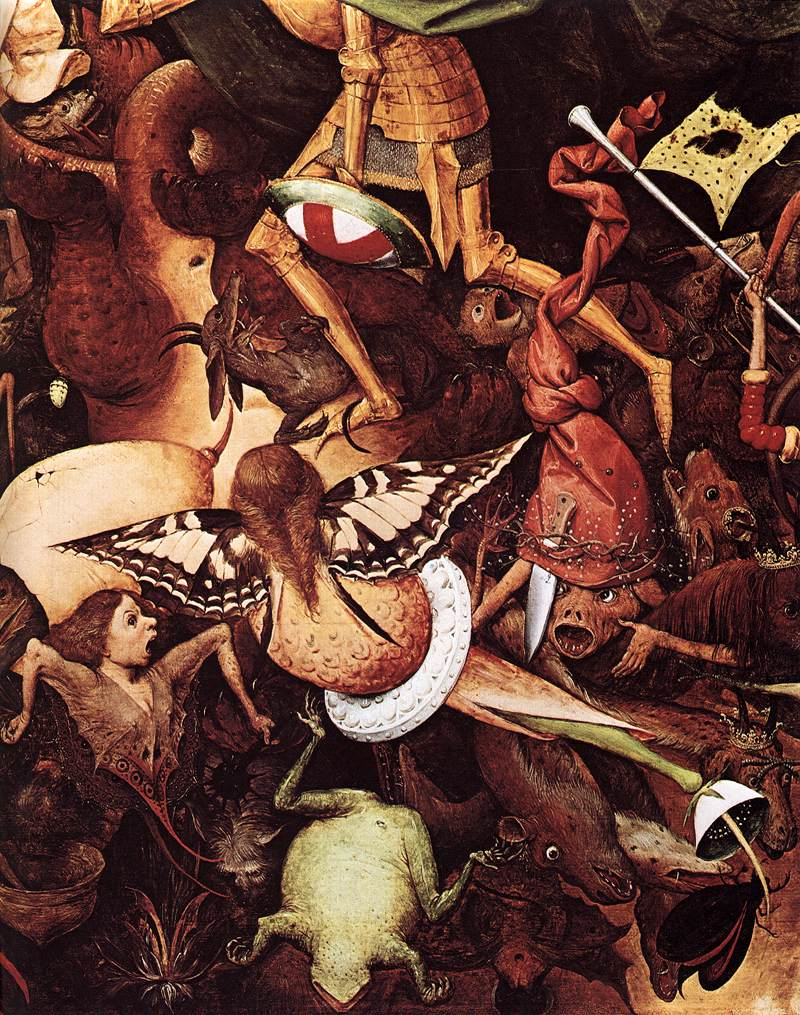
Half-Human and Half-Animal Monsters

== See also ==
- List of paintings by Pieter Bruegel the Elder
