= The Peasant Wedding =

Painting by Pieter Bruegel the Elder

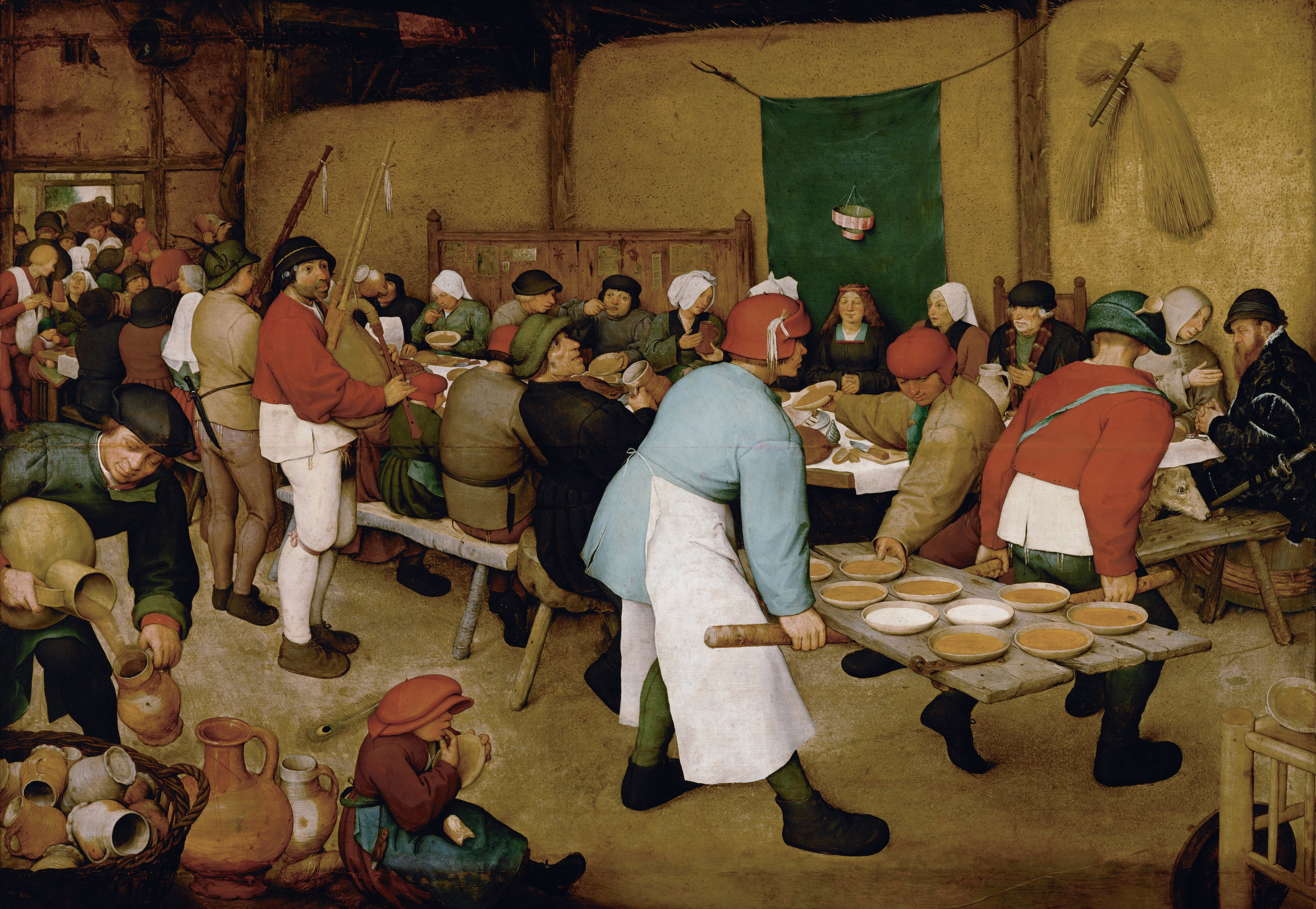
- Artist: Pieter Bruegel the Elder
- Year: 1567
- Medium: Oil on panel
- Dimensions: 114 cm × 164 cm (45 in × 65 in)
- Location: Vienna, Kunsthistorisches Museum

The Peasant Wedding is a 1567 genre painting by the Dutch and Flemish Renaissance painter and printmaker Pieter Bruegel the Elder, one of his many depicting peasant life. It is now in the Kunsthistorisches Museum, Vienna. Pieter Bruegel the Elder enjoyed painting peasants and different aspects of their lives in so many of his paintings that he has been called Peasant-Bruegel, but he was an intellectual, and many of his paintings have a symbolic meaning as well as a moral aspect.

== Scene ==
The bride is in front of the green textile wall-hanging, with a paper-crown hung above her head. She is also wearing a crown and sitting passively amidst the hearty eating and drinking around her. The bridegroom is not immediately obvious. The feast is in a barn in the summertime; two sheaves of grain with a rake recalls the work of harvesting, and the hard peasant life. Porters carry plates on a door taken off its hinges. The main food is bread, porridge and soup. Two pipers play the pijpzak, an unbreeched boy in the foreground licks a plate, a wealthy man at the far right is talking to a Franciscan friar, a dog emerges from under the table to snatch pieces of bread on the bench. The scene is said to accurately depict 16th-century peasant wedding customs.

== The groom ==
There has been much conjecture as to the identity of the groom in this painting. The critics Gilbert Highet and Gustav Glück have argued that the groom is the man in the centre of the painting, wearing a dark coat and seen in profile, or the ill-bred son of a wealthy couple, seen against the far wall to the right of the bride, eating with a spoon. It has also been suggested that according to contemporary custom, the groom is not seated, but may be the man pouring out beer.

According to the same custom, he may also be the man handing the plates of food to his guests from the near end of the table, wearing a red cap.

In a Freudian vein, Rudy Rucker speculates:

... the groom is the man in the red hat, passing food towards the bride. The motion of a husband, to penetrate the wife. Near him are no less than three phallic symbols pointing towards the wife: the man’s arm, the knife on the table, and the salt-cellar [salt shaker] on the table. At the end of the man’s arm is an ellipse of an angle-seen dish that is oriented and located in the right location to represent the bride’s vagina.

Some authors have even suggested that the groom is not even included in the painting. Van der Elst speculated that this could be the depiction of an old Flemish proverb: It is a poor man who is not able to be at his own wedding. Some connect it with the biblical Wedding of Cana. Lindsay and Bernard Huppé speculated that the painting was a Christian allegory of corruption, depicting the corrupted Church destined to be the bride of Christ, but the groom has not appeared to claim his corrupt bride.

== Mystery of the "third foot" ==
Many viewers have wondered why Bruegel appears to have given a third foot to the red-clad servant on the right, carrying the tray. Bruegel’s son, Brueghel the Younger, thought that this foot was an error or, at best, too confusing for viewers. His 1620 copy of his father’s painting solves the problem simply by eliminating the third foot altogether. However, an analysis by Claudine Majzels of the angles and the relative positions of the people involved suggests that the red-clad servant’s “third foot” is actually the extended left foot of the brown-clad man who is in a half-crouch transferring the plates to the table.

== In popular culture ==
External videos
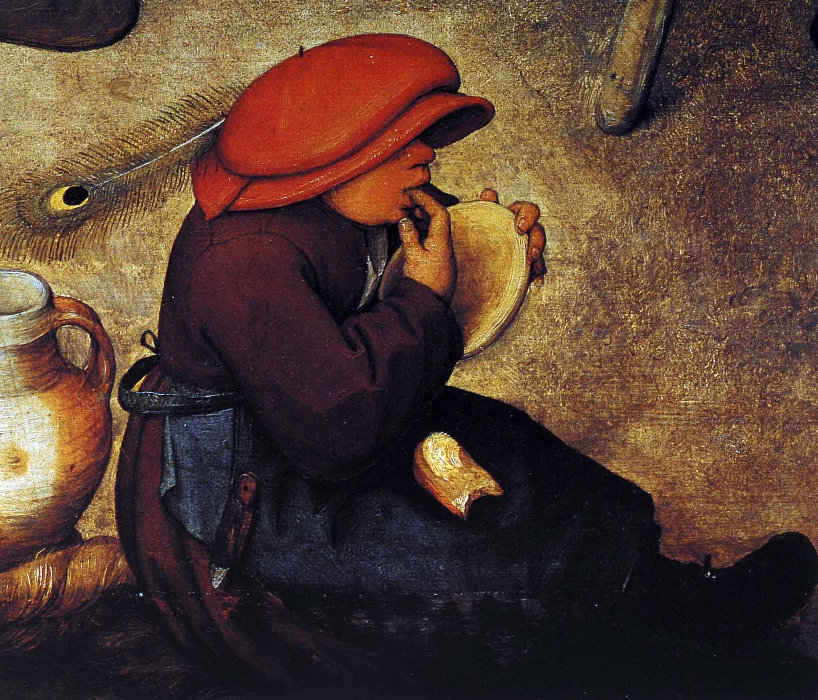
- Pieter Bruegel the Elder's Peasant Wedding, c. 1566-69, Smarthistory

The painting was parodied in Asterix in Belgium. Another parody was the postcard for the Belgian entry in the Eurovision Song Contest 1979.

== See also ==
- List of paintings by Pieter Bruegel the Elder
