= Pieter Bruegel the Elder =

Dutch and Flemish painter (c. 1525/30–1569)

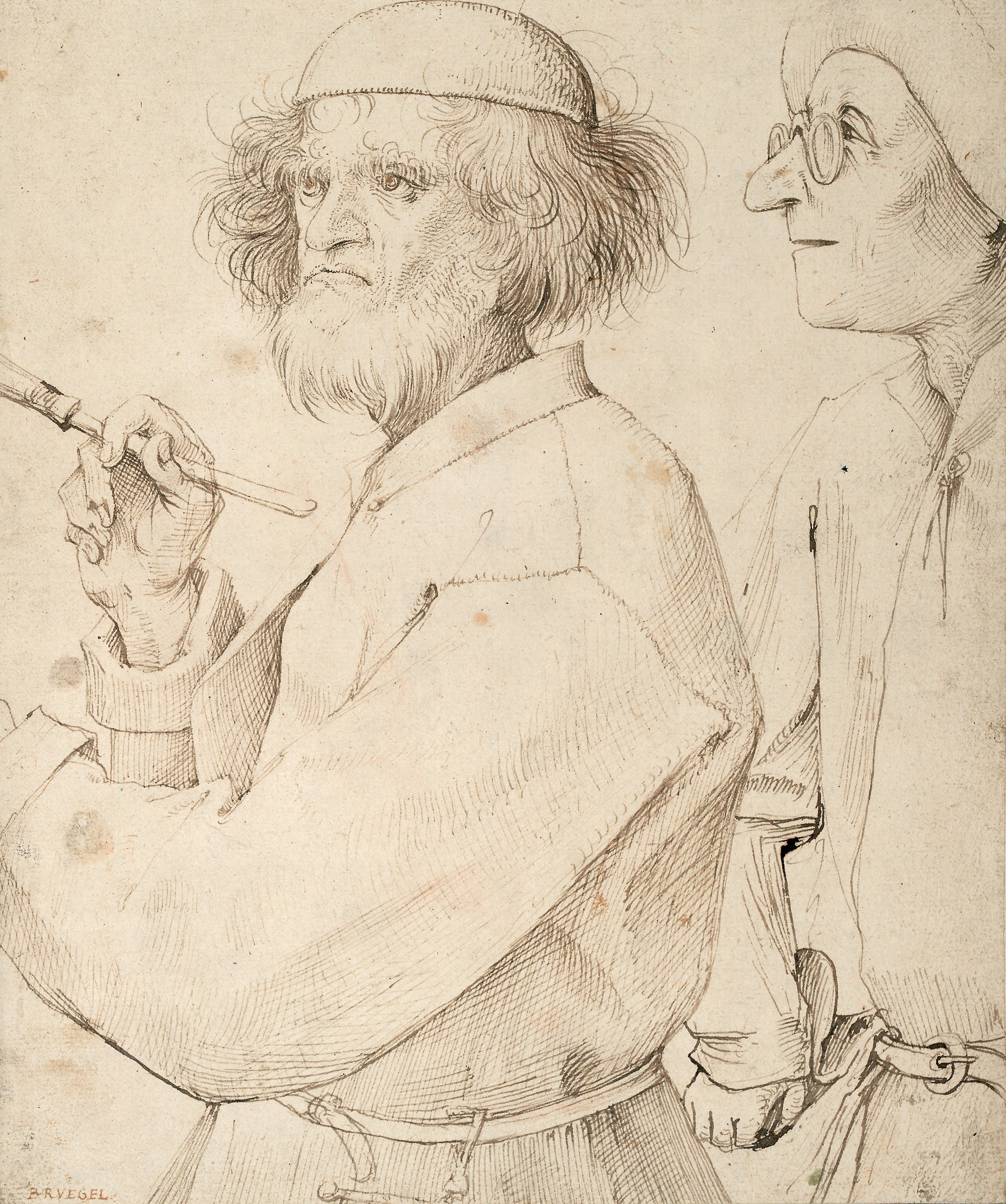
- The Painter and The Connoisseur, c. 1565, possibly Bruegel's self-portrait
- Born: Pieter Bruegel c. 1525–1530 probably Breda, (nowadays The Netherlands)
- Died: 9 September 1569 (aged 39 to 44); Brussels, Duchy of Brabant, Habsburg Netherlands, (nowadays Belgium)
- Known for: Painting, printmaking
- Notable work: The Hunters in the Snow, The Peasant Wedding, The Tower of Babel, The Triumph of Death
- Movement: Dutch and Flemish Renaissance

Pieter Bruegel (also Brueghel or Breughel) the Elder (/ˈbrɔɪɡəl/ BROY-gəl, US also /ˈbruːɡəl/ BROO-gəl; Dutch: [ˈpitər ˈbrøːɣəl]; c. 1525–1530 – 9 September 1569) was among the most significant artists of Dutch and Flemish Renaissance painting, a painter and printmaker, known for his landscapes and peasant scenes (so-called genre painting); he was a pioneer in presenting both types of subject as large paintings. In the 20th and 21st centuries, Bruegel works including Landscape with the Fall of Icarus (c. 1560) and The Hunters in the Snow (1565) have inspired artists in both the literary arts and in cinema.

He was a formative influence on Dutch Golden Age painting and later painting in general in his innovative choices of subject matter, as one of the first generation of artists to grow up when religious subjects had ceased to be the natural subject matter of painting. He also painted no portraits, the other mainstay of Netherlandish art. After his training and travels to Italy, he returned in 1555 to settle in Antwerp, where he worked mainly as a prolific designer of prints for the leading publisher of the day. At the end of the 1550s, he made painting his main medium, and all his famous paintings come from the following period of little more than a decade before his early death in 1569, when he was probably in his early forties.

== Life ==
=== Early life ===
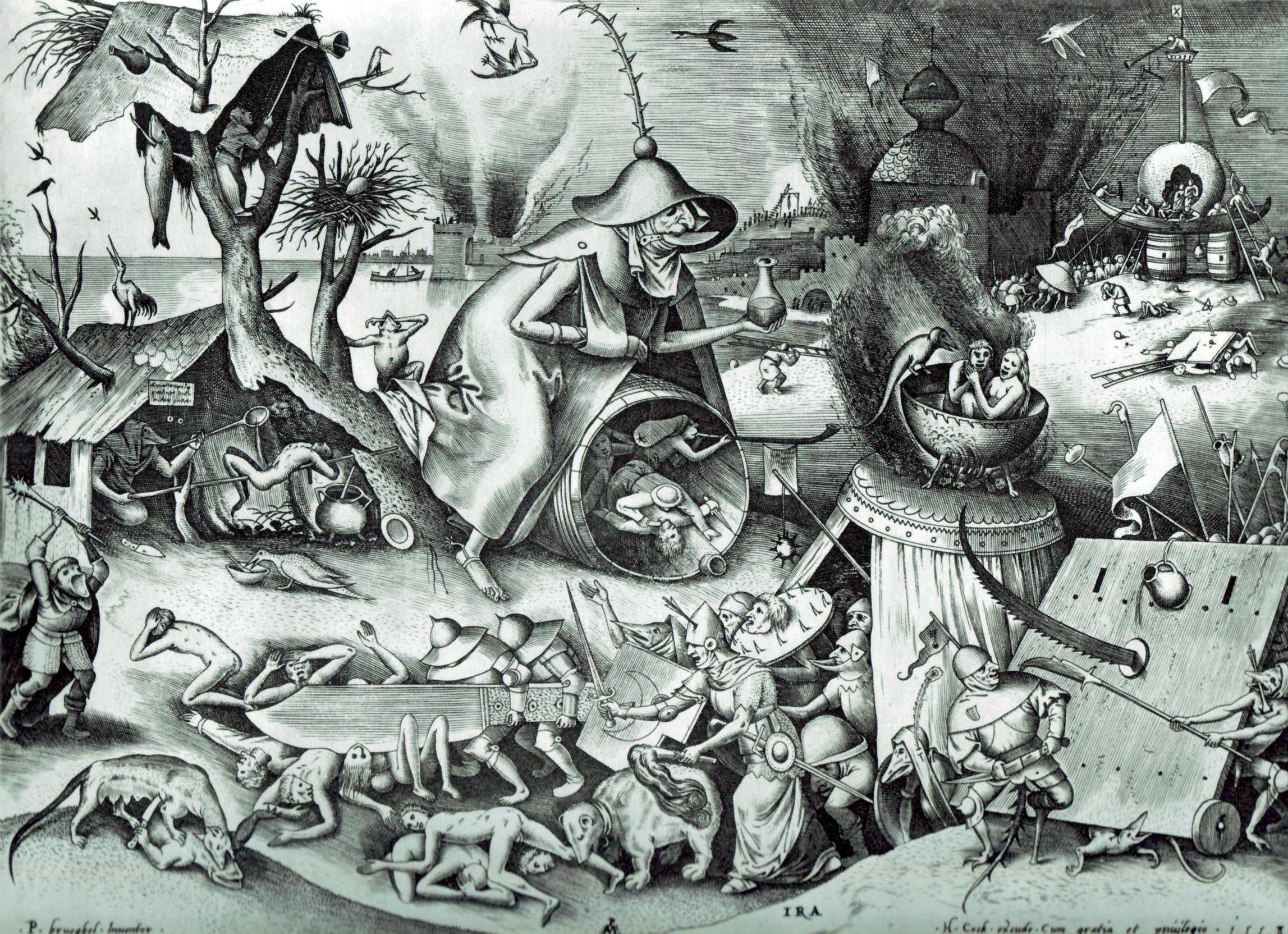
Engraving designed by Bruegel and published by Hieronymus Cock, The Seven Deadly Sins or the Seven Vices – Anger, 1558

Bruegel's birth date is not documented, but inferred from the fact that Bruegel entered the Antwerp painters' guild in 1551. This usually happened between the ages of twenty and twenty-five, giving a range for his birth between 1525 and 1530. His master, according to Karel van Mander, was the Antwerp painter Pieter Coecke van Aelst.

The two main early sources for Bruegel's biography are Lodovico Guicciardini's account of the Low Countries (1567) and Karel van Mander's 1604 Schilder-boeck. Guicciardini recorded that Bruegel was born in Breda, but van Mander specified that Bruegel was born in a village (dorp) near Breda called "Brueghel", which does not fit any known place. Nothing at all is known of his family background. Van Mander seems to assume he came from a peasant background, in keeping with the over-emphasis on Bruegel's peasant genre scenes given by van Mander and many early art historians and critics.

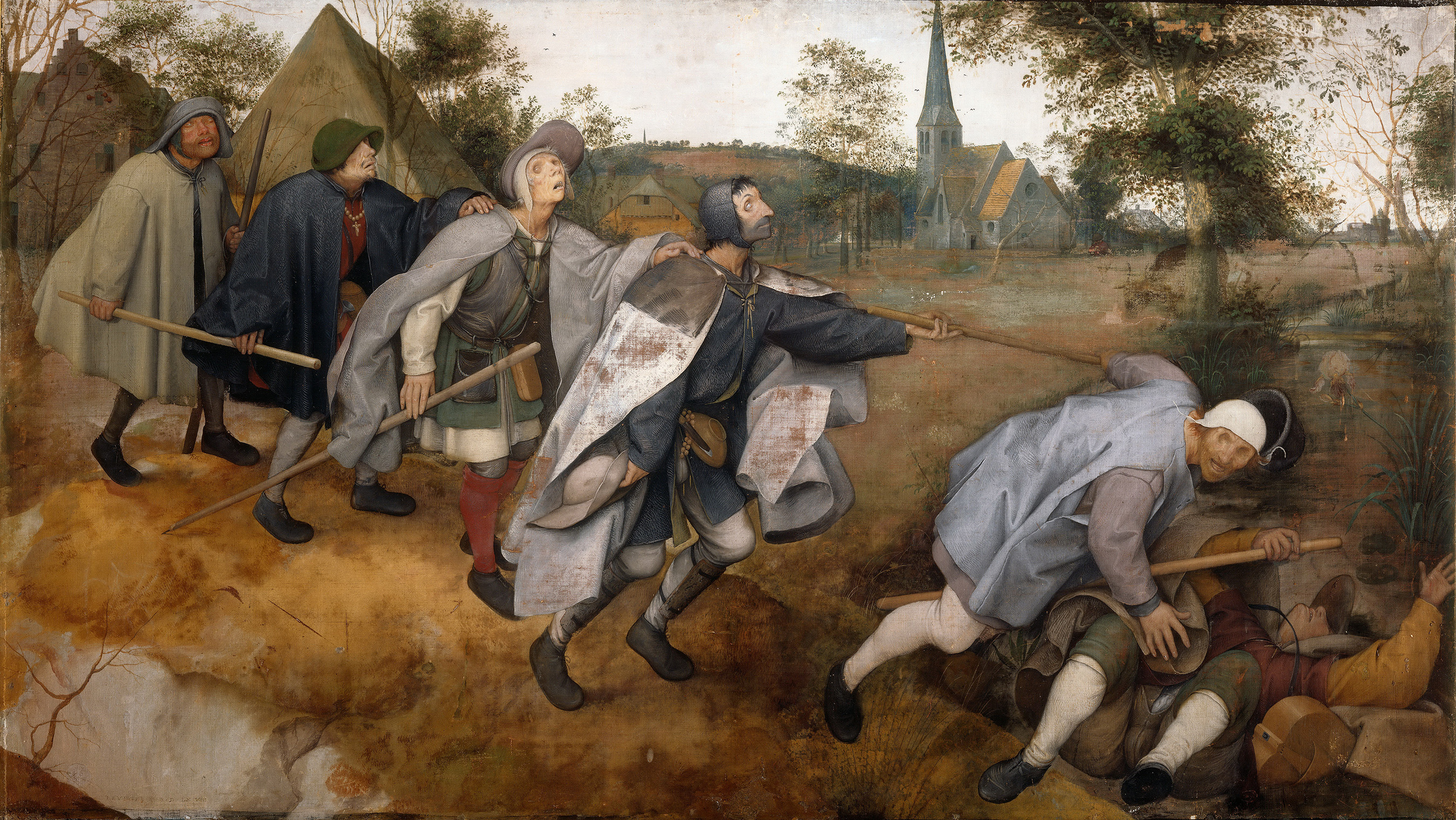
The Blind Leading the Blind, 1568

In contrast, scholars of the last six decades have emphasised the intellectual content of his work, and conclude: "There is, in fact, every reason to think that Pieter Bruegel was a townsman and a highly educated one, on friendly terms with the humanists of his time", ignoring van Mander's dorp and just placing his childhood in Breda itself. Breda was already a significant centre as the base of the House of Orange-Nassau, with a population of some 8,000, although 90% of its 1300 houses were destroyed in a fire in 1534. This reversal can be taken to excess; although Bruegel moved in highly educated humanist circles, it seems "he had not mastered Latin", and had others add the Latin captions in some of his drawings.

Between 1545 and 1550, he was a pupil of Pieter Coecke, who died on 6 December 1550. Before this, Bruegel was already working in Mechelen, where he is documented between September 1550 and October 1551 assisting Peeter Baltens on an altarpiece (now lost), painting the wings in grisaille. Bruegel possibly got this work via the connections of Mayken Verhulst, the wife of Pieter Coecke. Mayken's father and eight siblings were all artists or married artists, and lived in Mechelen.

=== Travel ===
In 1551, Bruegel became a free master in the Guild of Saint Luke of Antwerp. He set off for Italy soon after, probably by way of France. He visited Rome and, rather adventurously for the period, by 1552 had reached Reggio Calabria at the southern tip of the mainland, where a drawing records the city in flames after a Turkish raid. He probably continued to Sicily, but by 1553 was back in Rome. There he met the miniaturist Giulio Clovio, whose will of 1578 lists paintings by Bruegel; in one case, a joint work. These works, apparently landscapes, have not survived, but marginal miniatures in manuscripts by Clovio are attributed to Bruegel.

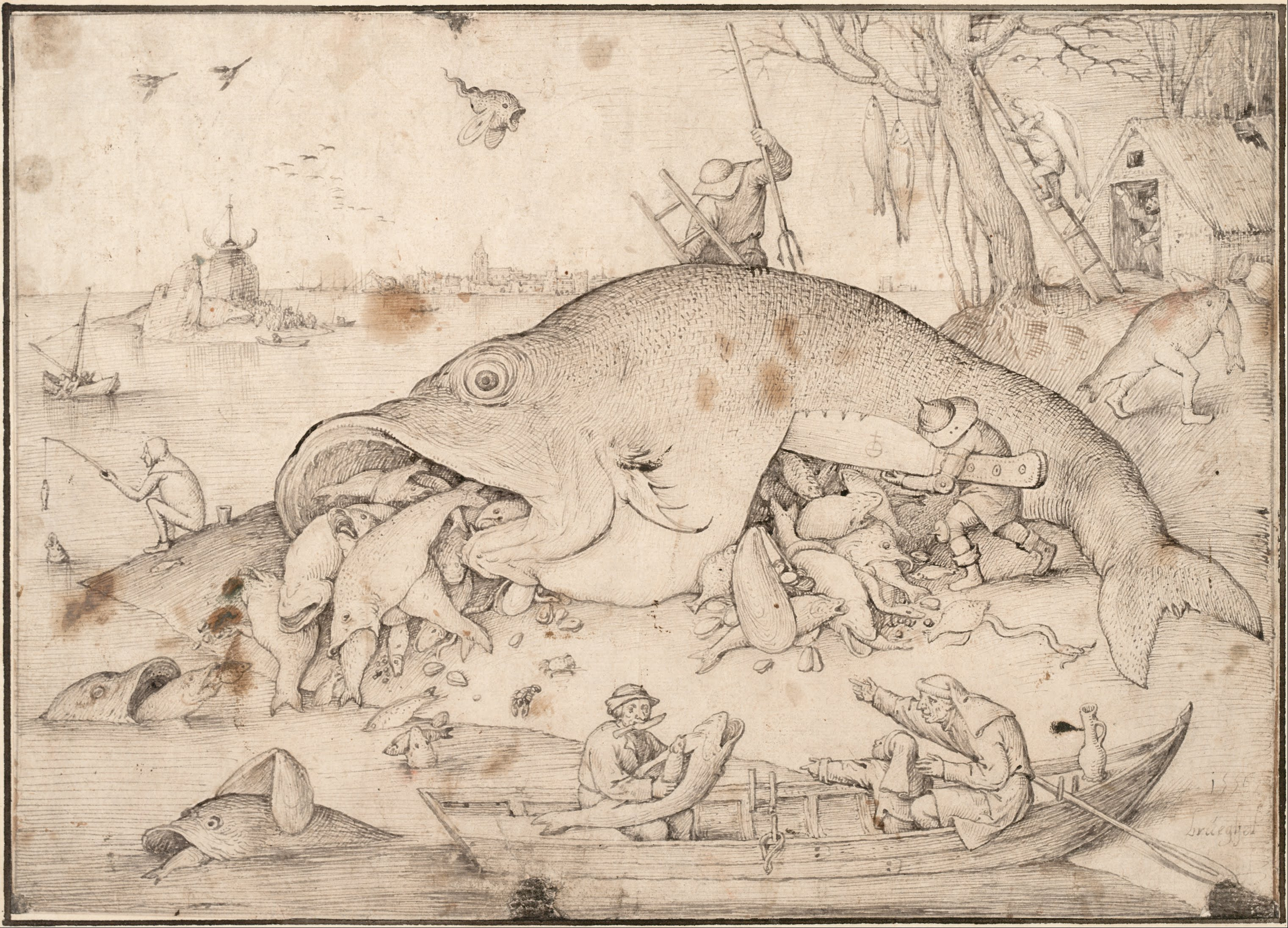
Big Fish Eat Little Fish, Bruegel's drawing for a print, 1556

He left Italy by 1554, and had reached Antwerp by 1555, when the set of prints to his designs known as the Large Landscapes were published by Hieronymus Cock, the most important print publisher of northern Europe. Bruegel's return route is uncertain, but much of the debate over it was made irrelevant in the 1980s when it was realised that the celebrated series of large drawings of mountain landscapes thought to have been made on the trip were not by Bruegel at all. All the drawings from the trip that are considered authentic are of landscapes; unlike most other 16th-century artists visiting Rome, he seems to have ignored both classical ruins and contemporary buildings.

=== Antwerp and Brussels ===
From 1555 until 1563, Bruegel lived in Antwerp, then the publishing centre of northern Europe, mainly working as a designer of more than forty prints for Cock, though his dated paintings begin in 1557. With one exception, Bruegel did not work the plates himself, but produced a drawing which Cock's specialists worked from. From 1559, he dropped the "h" from his name and signed his paintings as Bruegel; his relatives, including his children, continued to use "Brueghel" or "Breughel". He moved in the lively humanist circles of the city, and his change of name (or at least its spelling) in 1559 can be seen as an attempt to Latinise it; at the same time as he changed the script, he signed in from the Gothic blackletter to Roman capitals.

In 1563, he married Pieter Coecke van Aelst's daughter Mayken Coecke in Brussels, where he lived for the remainder of his short life. Antwerp was the capital of Netherlandish commerce and the art market; Brussels was the centre of government. Van Mander tells a story that his mother-in-law pushed for the move to distance him from his established servant girl mistress. By now, painting had become his main activity, and his most famous works come from these years. His paintings were much sought after, with patrons including wealthy Flemish collectors and Cardinal Granvelle, in effect the Habsburg chief minister, who was based in Mechelen. Bruegel had two sons, both well known as painters, and a daughter about whom nothing is known. These were Pieter Brueghel the Younger (1564–1638) and Jan Brueghel the Elder (1568–1625); he died too early to train either of them. He died in Brussels on 9 September 1569 and was buried in the Kapellekerk.

Van Mander records that before Bruegel died he told his wife to burn some drawings, perhaps designs for prints, carrying inscriptions "which were too sharp or sarcastic ... either out of remorse or for fear that she might come to harm or in some way be held responsible for them", which has led to much speculation that they were politically or doctrinally provocative, in a climate of sharp tension in these areas.

== Historical background ==
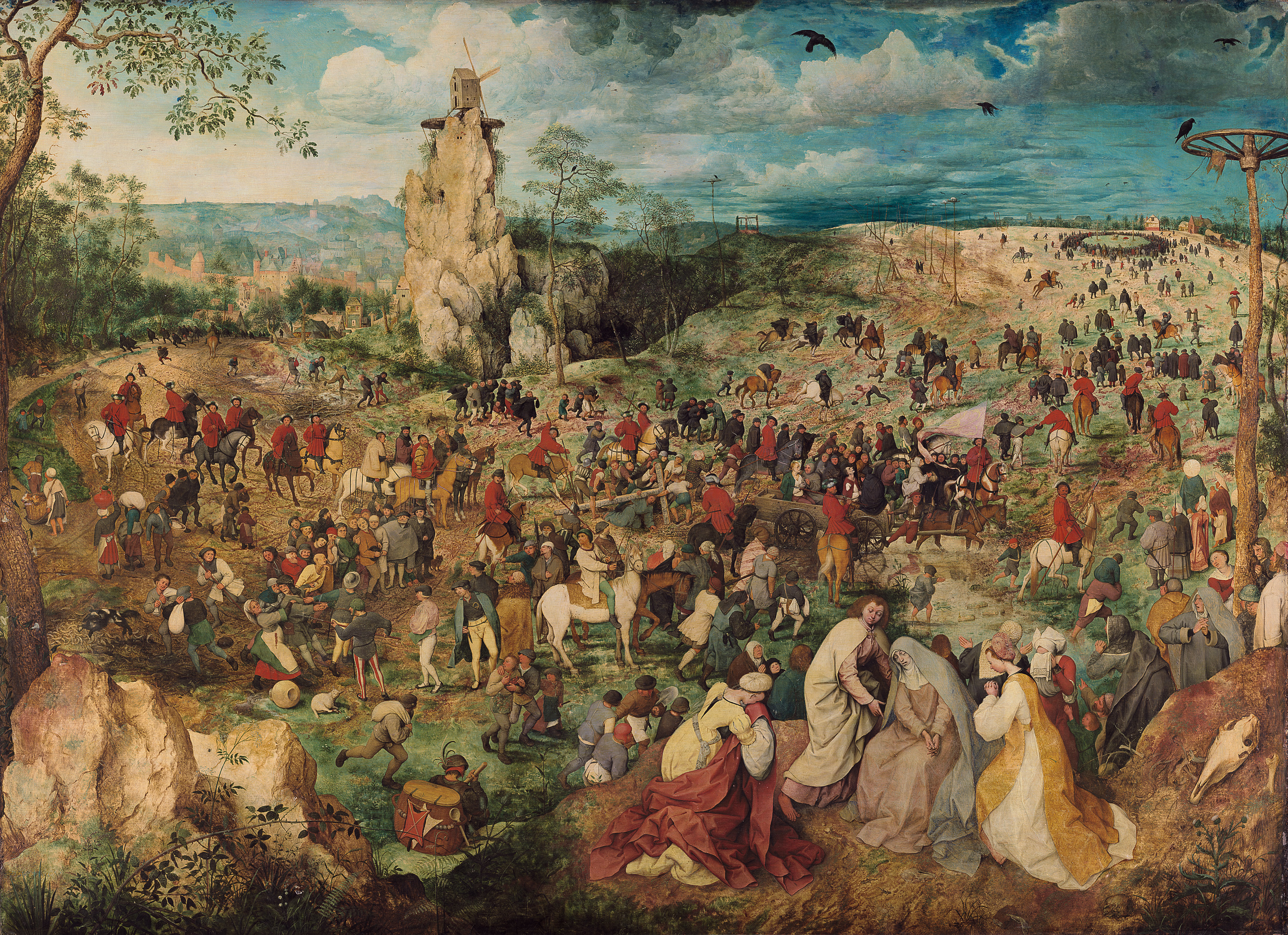
The Procession to Calvary, 1564, Bruegel's second largest painting at 124 cm × 170 cm (49 in × 67 in)

Bruegel was born at a time of extensive change in Western Europe. Humanist ideals from the previous century influenced artists and scholars. Italy was at the end of its High Renaissance of arts and culture, when artists such as Michelangelo and Leonardo da Vinci painted their masterpieces. In 1517, about eight years before Bruegel's birth, Martin Luther created his Ninety-five Theses and began the Protestant Reformation in neighbouring Germany. Reformation was accompanied by iconoclasm and widespread destruction of art, including in the Low Countries. The Catholic Church viewed Protestantism and its destructive iconoclasm of art as a threat to the Church. The Council of Trent, which concluded in 1563, determined that religious art should be more focused on religious subject-matter and less on material things and decorative qualities.

At this time, the Low Countries were divided into Seventeen Provinces, some of which wanted separation from the Habsburg rule based in Spain. The Reformation, meanwhile, produced a number of Protestant denominations that gained followers in the Seventeen Provinces, influenced by the newly Lutheran German states to the east and the newly Anglican England to the west. The Habsburg monarchs of Spain attempted a policy of strict religious uniformity for the Catholic Church within their domains and enforced it with the Inquisition. Increasing religious antagonisms and riots, political manoeuvrings, and executions eventually resulted in the outbreak of the Eighty Years' War.

In this atmosphere, Bruegel reached the height of his career as a painter. Two years before his death, the Eighty Years' War began between the United Provinces and Spain. Although Bruegel did not live to see it, seven provinces became independent and formed the Dutch Republic, while the other ten remained under Habsburg control at the end of the war.

== Subjects ==
=== Peasants ===
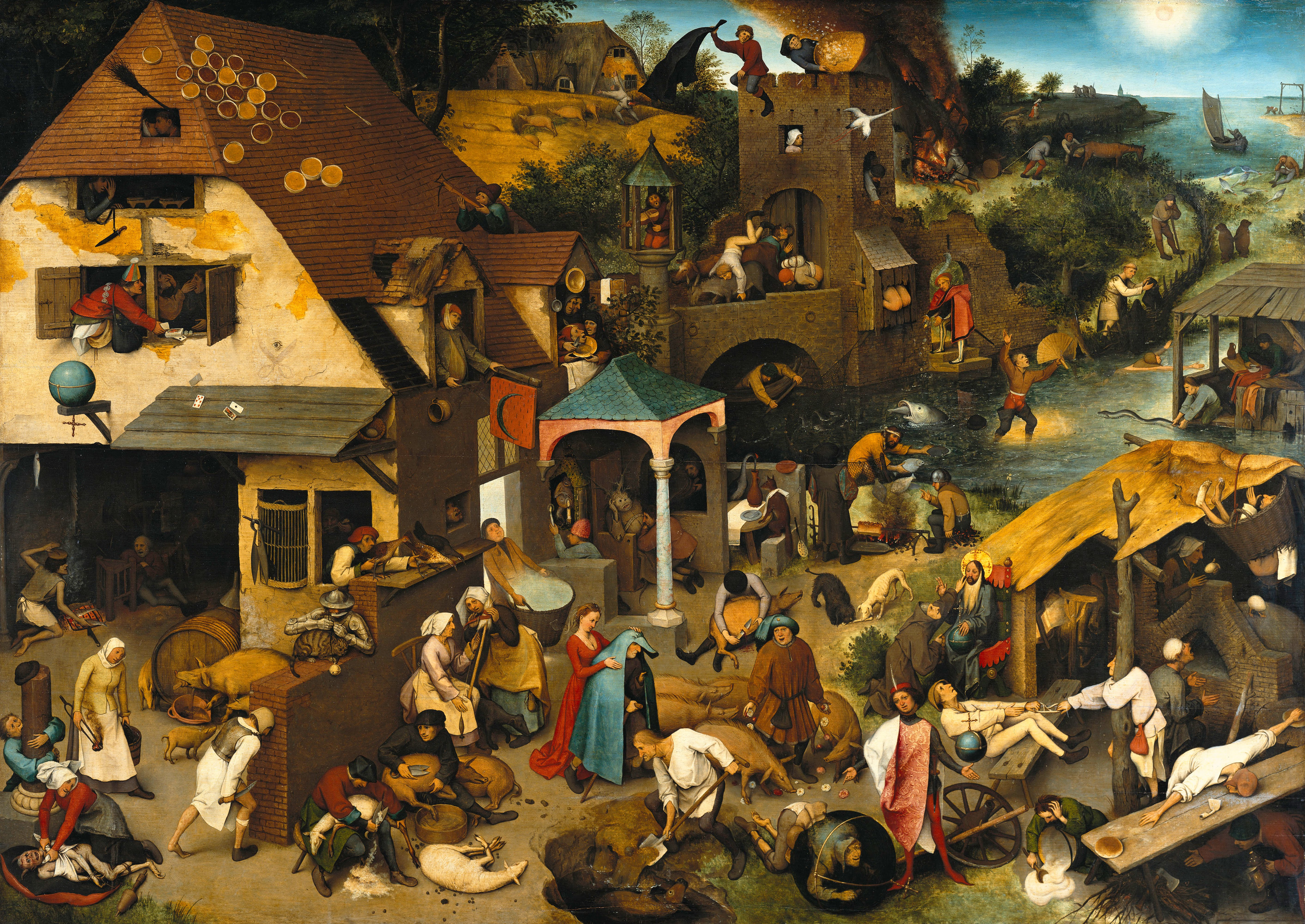
Netherlandish Proverbs, 1559, oil on oak wood

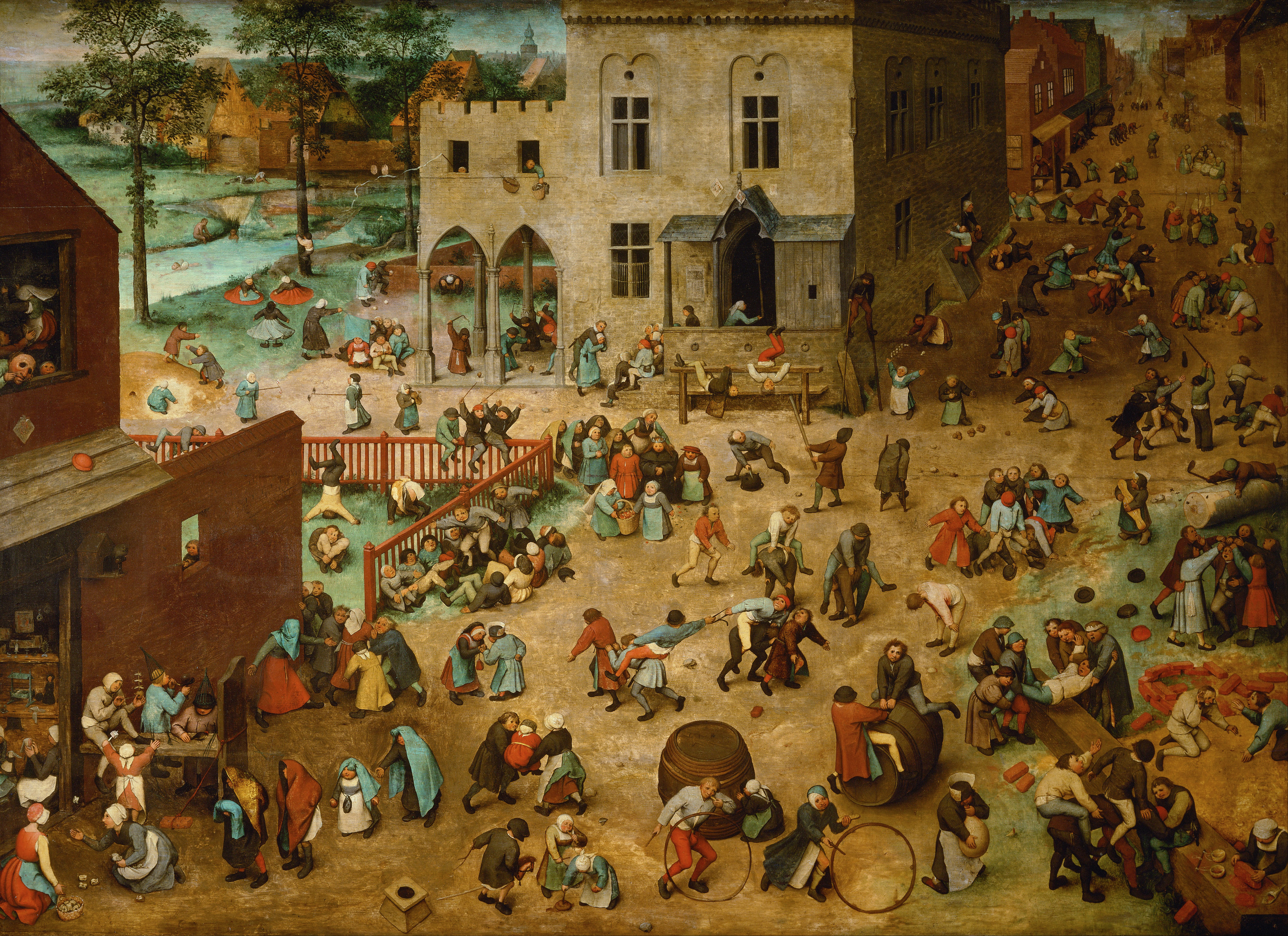
Children's Games, 1560

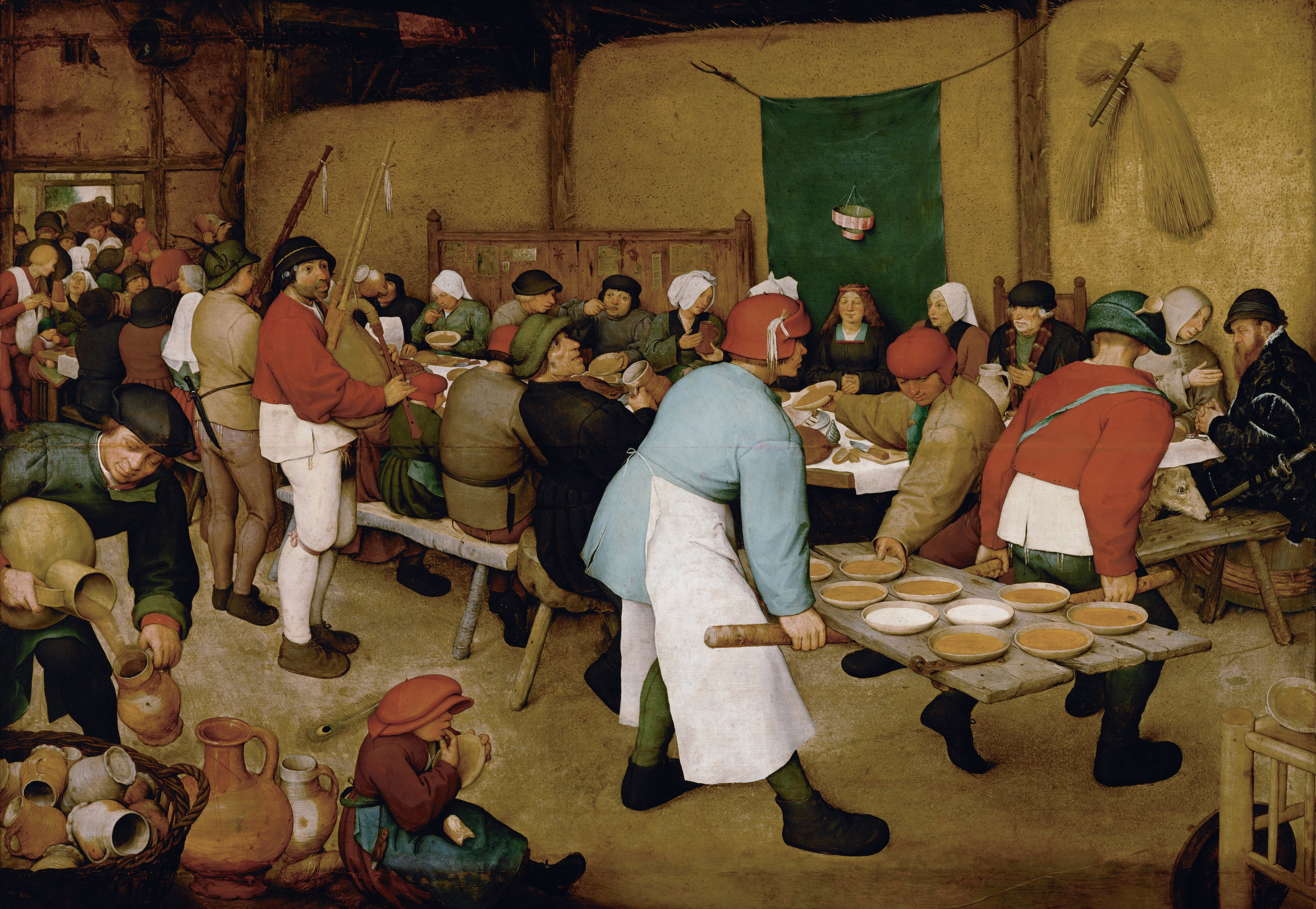
The Peasant Wedding, 1566–69, oil on panel. A late peasant subject, with a more monumental treatment.

Pieter Bruegel specialised in genre paintings populated by peasants, often with a landscape element, though he also painted religious works. Making the life and manners of peasants the main focus of a work was rare in painting in Bruegel's time, and he was a pioneer of the genre painting. Many of his peasant paintings fall into two groups in terms of scale and composition, both of which were original and influential on later painting. His earlier style shows dozens of small figures, seen from a high viewpoint, and spread fairly evenly across the central picture space. The setting is typically an urban space surrounded by buildings, within which the figures have a "fundamentally disconnected manner of portrayal", with individuals or small groups engaged in their own distinct activity, while ignoring all the others.

His earthy, unsentimental but vivid depiction of the rituals of village life—including agriculture, hunts, meals, festivals, dances, and games—are unique windows on a vanished folk culture, though still characteristic of Belgian life and culture today, and a prime source of iconographic evidence about both physical and social aspects of 16th-century life. For example, his famous painting Netherlandish Proverbs, originally The Blue Cloak, illustrates dozens of then-contemporary aphorisms, many of which still are in use in current Flemish, French, English and Dutch.

The Flemish environment provided a large artistic audience for proverb-filled paintings because proverbs were well known and recognisable as well as entertaining. Children's Games shows the variety of amusements enjoyed by young people. His winter landscapes of 1565, like The Hunters in the Snow, are taken as corroborative evidence of the severity of winters during the Little Ice Age. Bruegel often painted community events, as in The Peasant Wedding and The Fight Between Carnival and Lent. In paintings such as The Peasant Wedding, Bruegel painted individual, identifiable people, while the people in The Fight Between Carnival and Lent are unidentifiable, muffin-faced allegories of greed or gluttony.

Bruegel also painted religious scenes in a wide Flemish landscape setting, as in the Conversion of Paul and The Sermon of St. John the Baptist. Even if Bruegel's subject matter was unconventional, the religious ideals and proverbs driving his paintings were typical of the Northern Renaissance. He accurately depicted people with disabilities, such as in The Blind Leading the Blind, which depicted a quote from the Bible: "If the blind lead the blind, both shall fall into the ditch" (Matthew 15:14). Using the Bible to interpret this painting, the six blind men are symbols of the blindness of mankind in pursuing earthly goals instead of focusing on Christ's teachings. Using abundant spirit and comic power, Bruegel created some of the very early images of acute social protest in art history. Examples include paintings such as The Fight Between Carnival and Lent (a satire of the conflicts of the Protestant Reformation) and engravings like The Ass in the School and Strongboxes Battling Piggybanks.

In the 1560s, Bruegel moved to a style showing only a few large figures, typically in a landscape background without a distant view. His paintings, dominated by their landscapes, take a middle course as regards both the number and size of figures.

Late monumental peasant figures

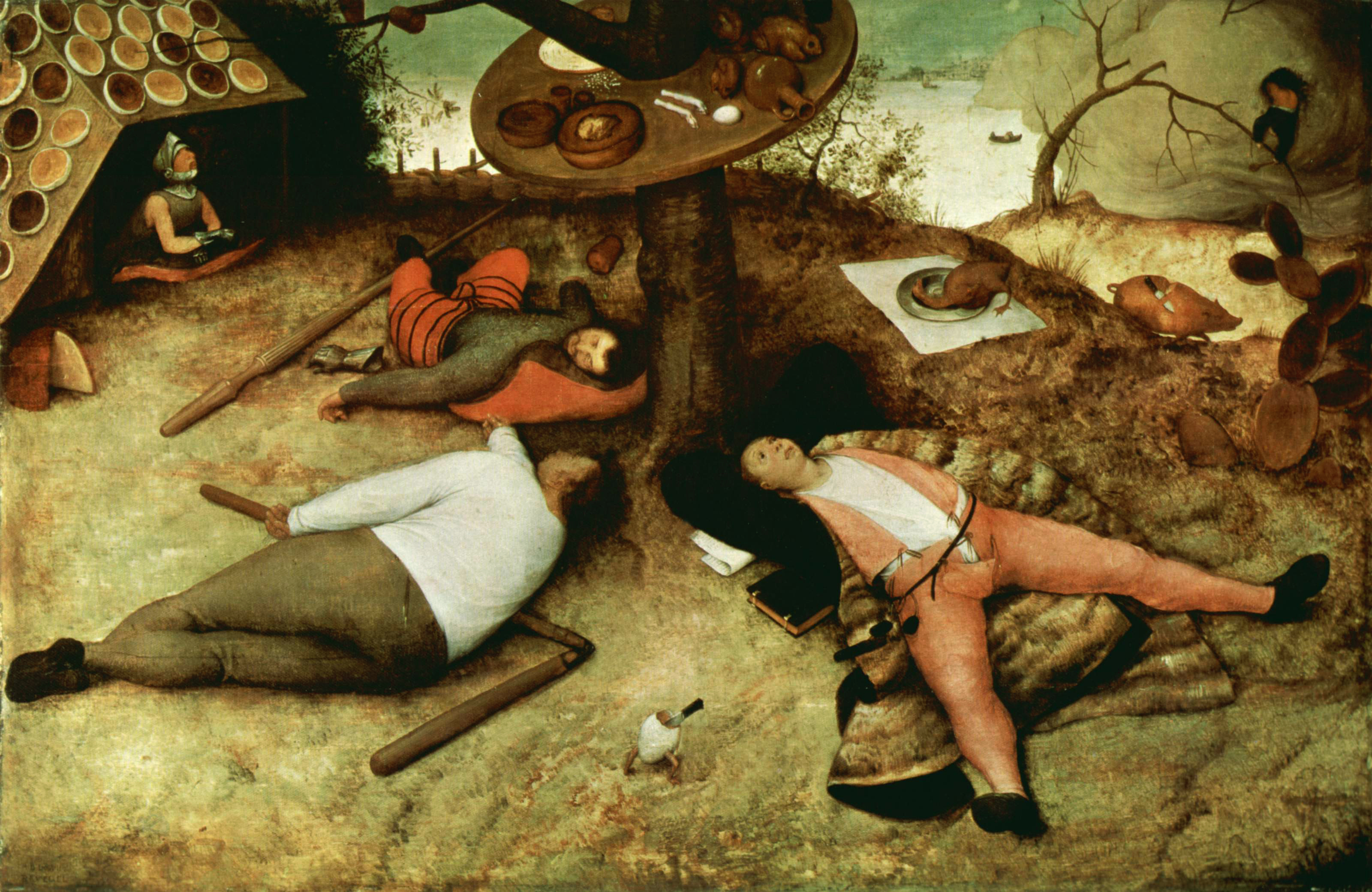
The Land of Cockaigne (1567), Alte Pinakothek, an illustration of the medieval mythical land of plenty called Cockaigne

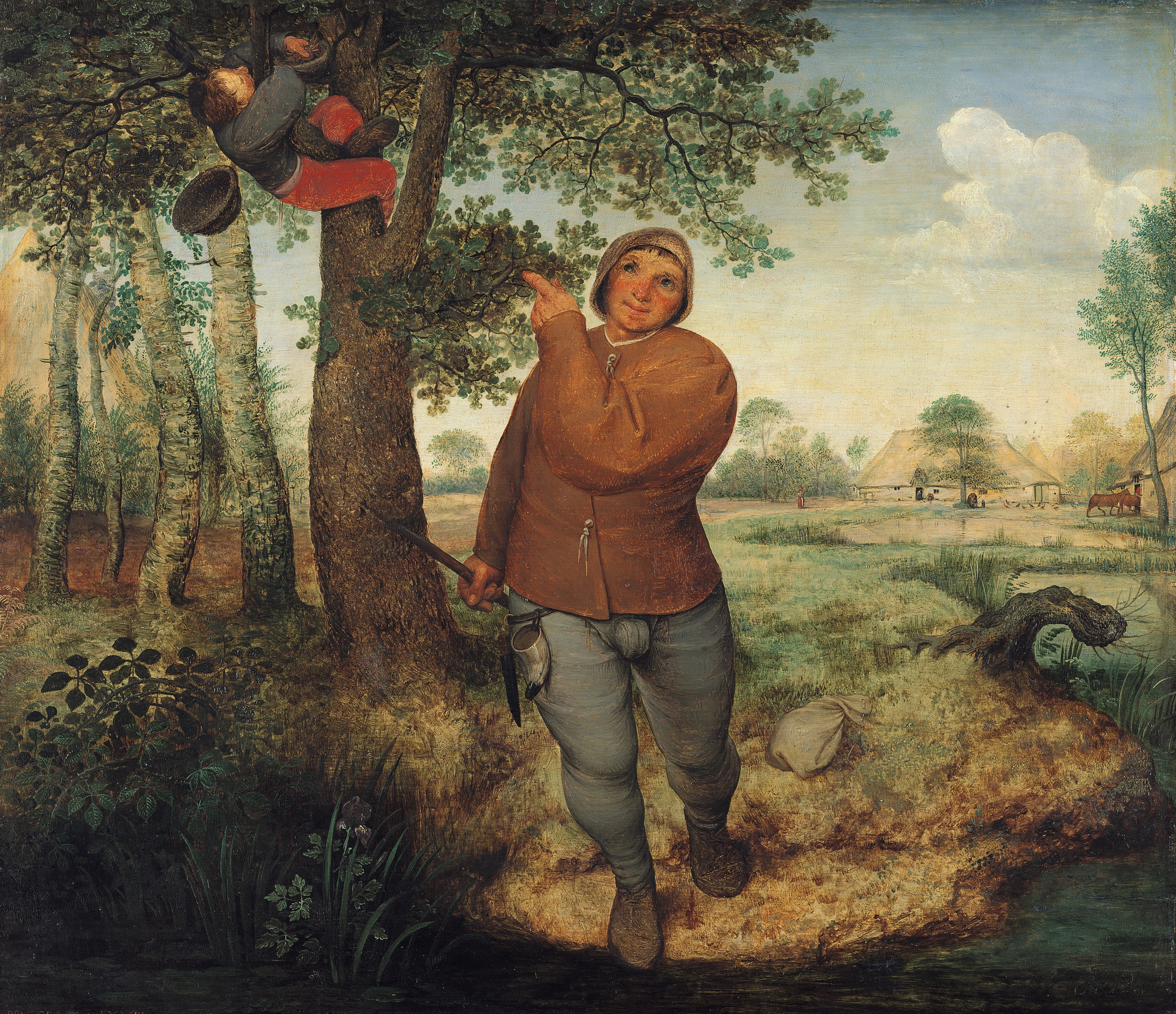
The Peasant and the Nest Robber (1568), Kunsthistorisches Museum, Vienna

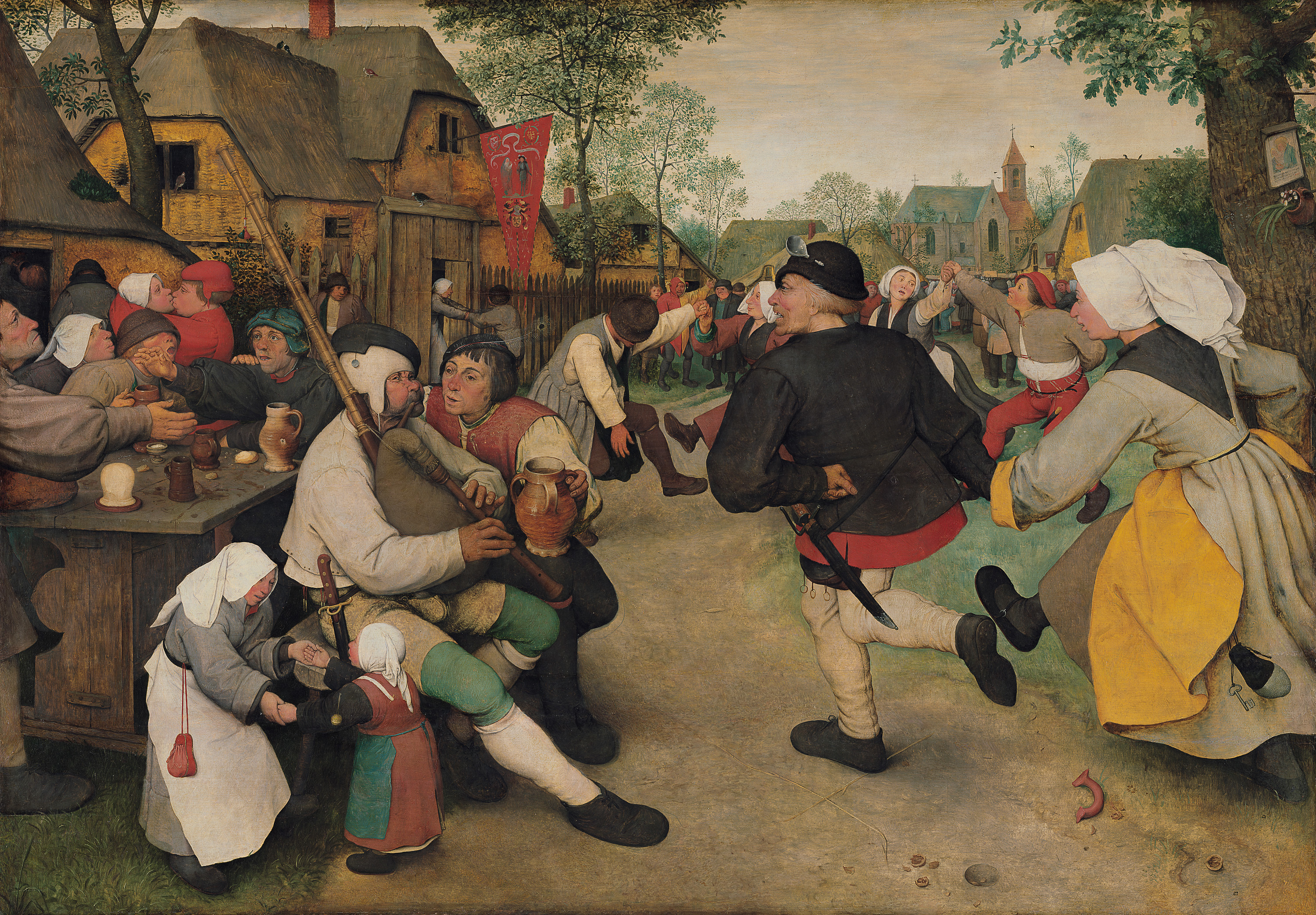
The Peasant Dance (1568), Kunsthistorisches Museum, Vienna, oil on oak panel

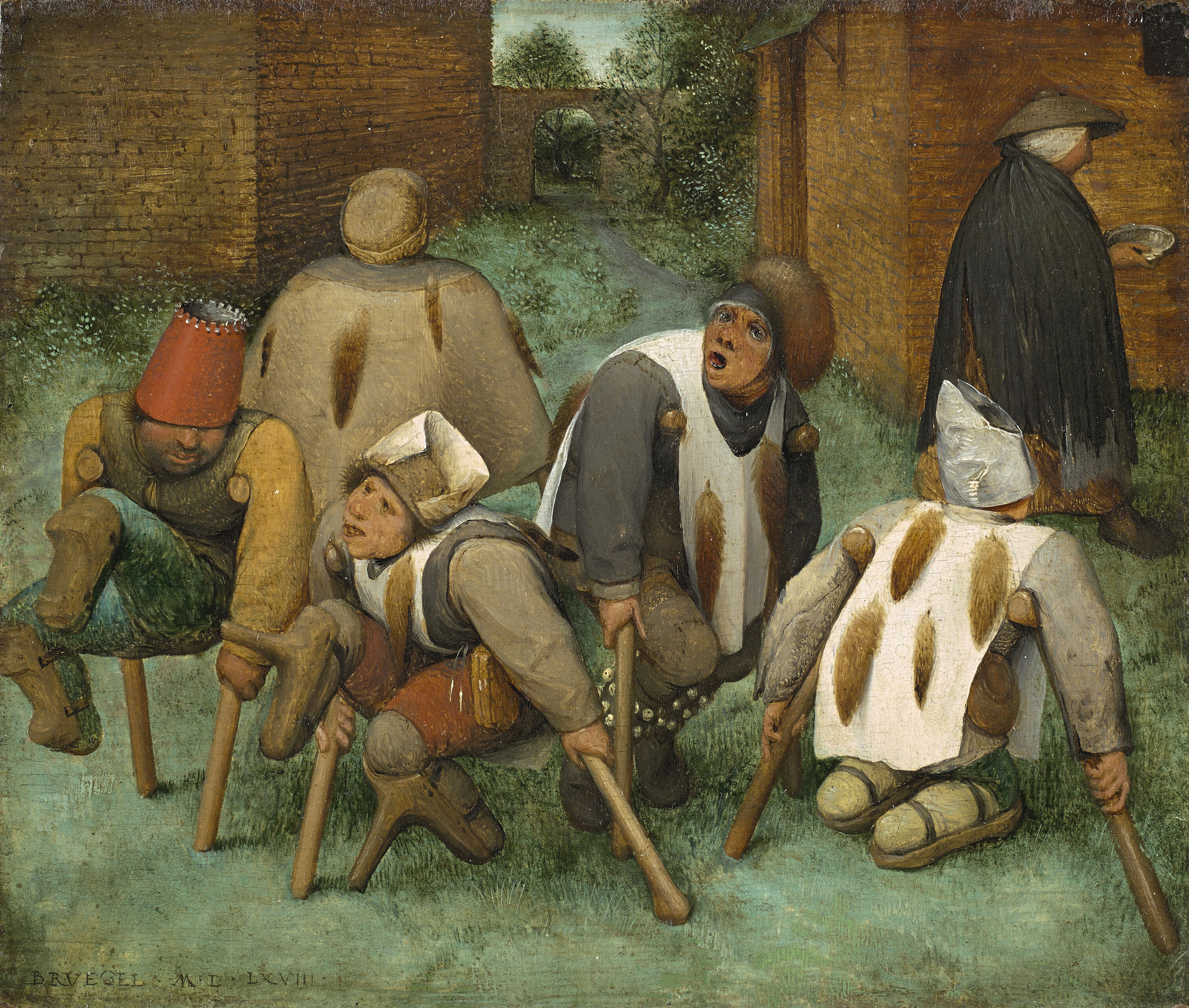
The Beggars (The Cripples) (1568), Louvre, Paris, oil on panel

=== Landscape elements ===
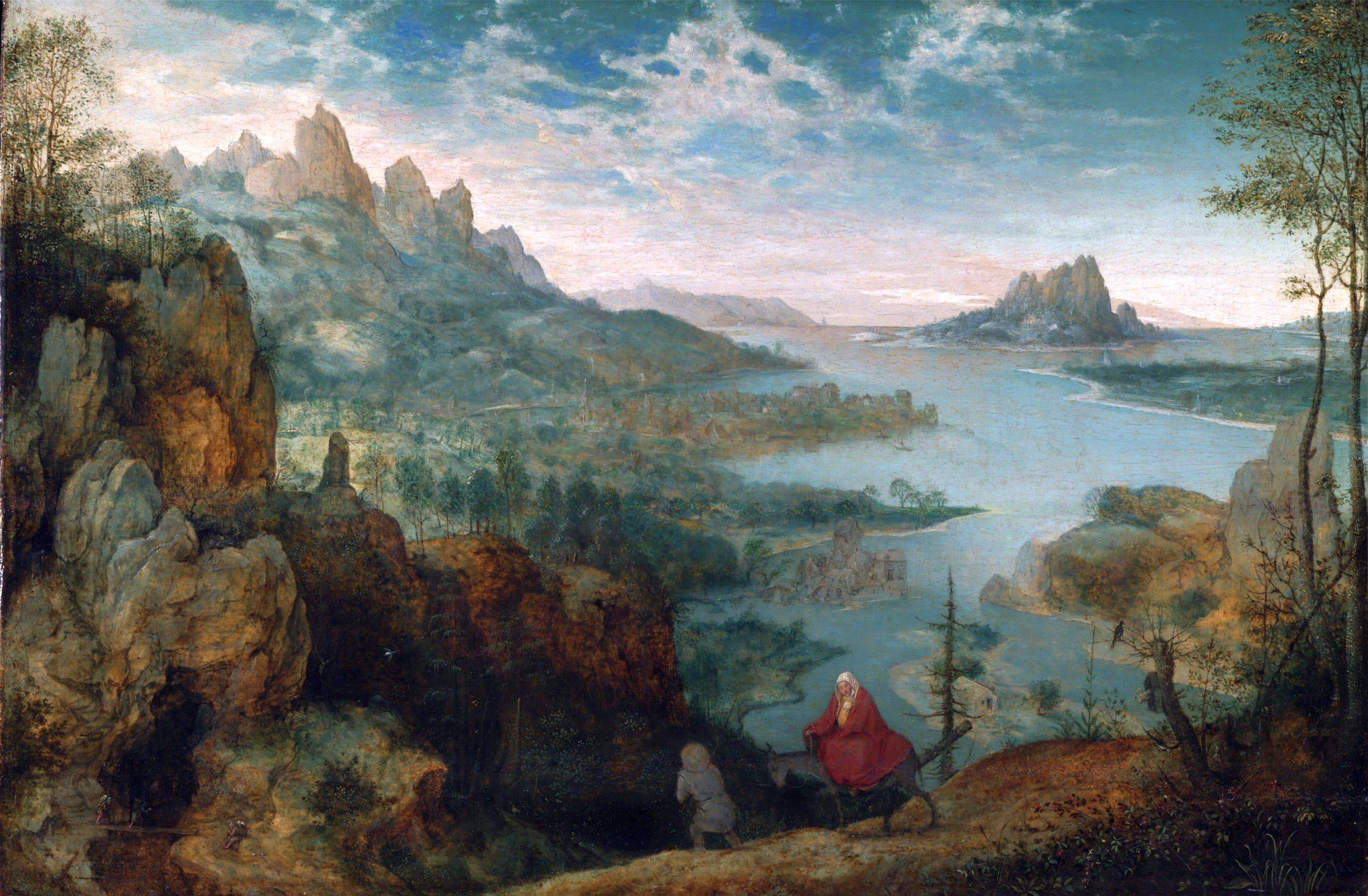
Landscape with the Flight into Egypt, 1563, 37.1 × 55.6 cm (14.6 × 21.9 in), owned by Cardinal Granvelle

Bruegel adapted and made more natural the world landscape style, which shows small figures in an imaginary panoramic landscape seen from an elevated viewpoint that includes mountains and lowlands, water, and buildings. Back in Antwerp from Italy he was commissioned in the 1550s by the publisher Hieronymus Cock to make drawings for a series of engravings, the Large Landscapes, to meet what was now a growing demand for landscape images.

Some of his earlier paintings, such as his Landscape with the Flight into Egypt (Courtauld, 1563), are fully within the Patinir conventions, but his Landscape with the Fall of Icarus (known from two copies) had a Patinir-style landscape, in which already the largest figure was a genre figure who was only a bystander for the supposed narrative subject, and may not even be aware of it. The date of Bruegel's lost original is unclear, but it is probably relatively early, and if so, foreshadows the trend of his later works. During the 1560s, the early scenes crowded with multitudes of very small figures, whether peasant genre figures or figures in religious narratives, give way to a small number of much larger figures.

==== Months of the year ====
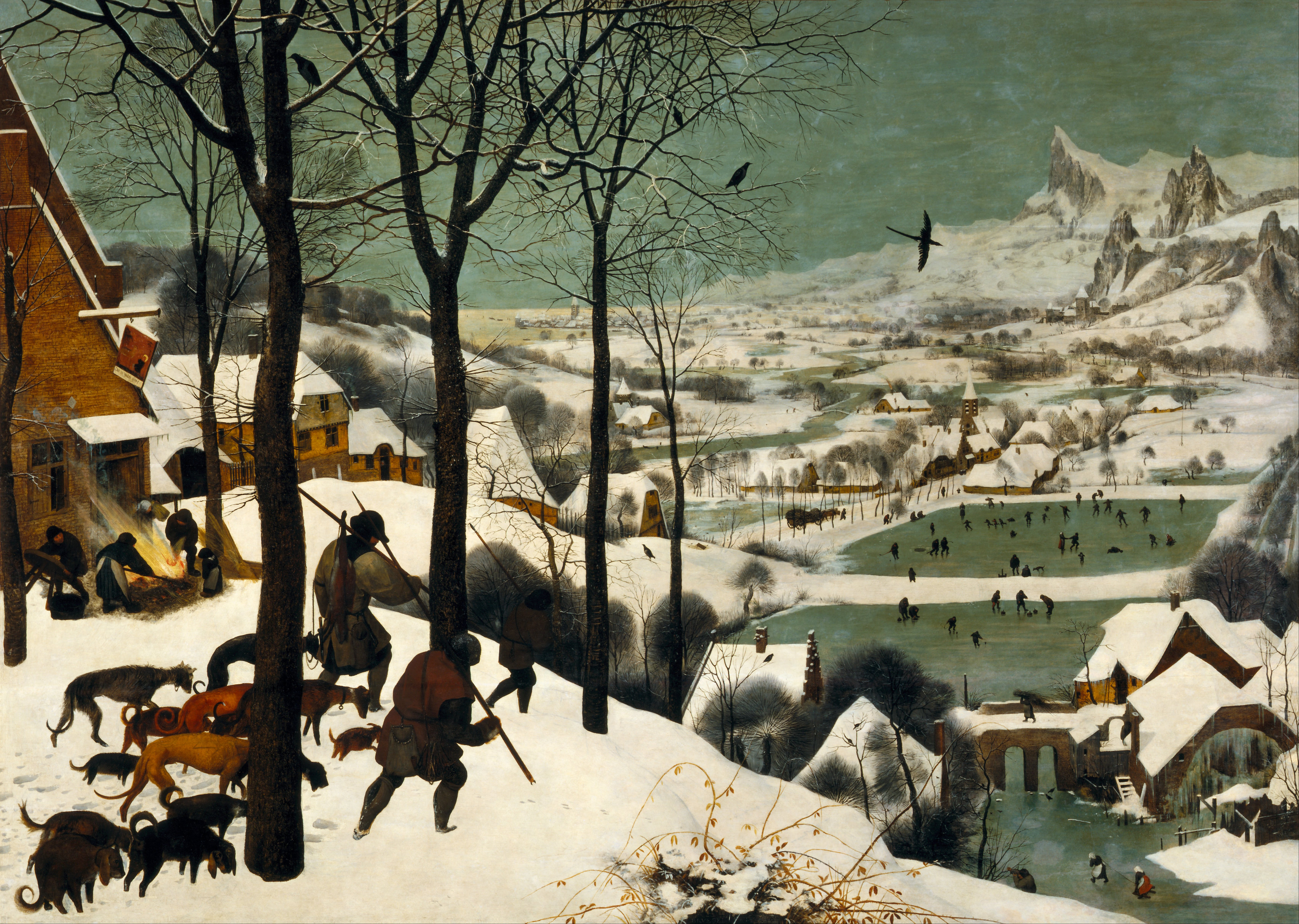
The Hunters in the Snow, 1565, oil on wood

His well-known set of landscapes with genre figures depicting the seasons are the culmination of his landscape style; the five surviving paintings use the basic elements of the world landscape (only one lacks craggy mountains) but transform them into his own style. They are larger than most previous works, with a genre scene with several figures in the foreground, and the panoramic view seen past or through trees. Bruegel was also aware of the Danube School's landscape style through old master prints. The surviving five paintings are The Gloomy Day (February–March), The Hunters in the Snow (December–January), and The Return of the Herd (October–November) which are on display in the Kunsthistorisches Museum in Vienna; The Hay Harvest (June–July) is on display in the Lobkowicz Palace in Prague; and The Harvesters (July–August) which is on display at the Metropolitan in New York. The painting associated with the April–May seasonal transition is assumed to be lost.

The series on the months of the year includes several of Bruegel's best-known works. In 1565, a wealthy patron in Antwerp, Niclaes Jonghelinck, commissioned him to paint a series of paintings of each month of the year. There has been a dispute among art historians as to whether the series originally included six or twelve works. Joseph Koerner in his 2018 book Bosch and Bruegel states that Archduke Ernst, who took possession of the paintings after Niclaes defaulted on taxes, had as early as 1569 inventoried only six paintings in this series during the year of Bruegel's death. The collection is next inventoried to be in the possession of Archduke Leopold who in 1659 indicated that five of them were extant. Only five of these paintings are known to have survived into the 21st century. Traditional Flemish luxury books of hours (e.g., the Très Riches Heures du Duc de Berry; 1416) had calendar pages that included the Labours of the Months, depictions set in landscapes of the agricultural tasks, weather, and social life typical for that month.

Bruegel's paintings were on a far larger scale than a typical calendar page painting, each one approximately three feet by five feet. For Bruegel, this was a large commission (the price of a commission was based on how large the painting was) and an important one. In 1565, the Calvinist riots began, and it was only two years before the Eighty Years' War broke out. Bruegel may have felt safer with a secular commission so as not to offend Calvinists or Catholics. Some of the most famous paintings from this series included The Hunters in the Snow (December–January) and The Harvesters (August–September).

== Prints and drawings ==
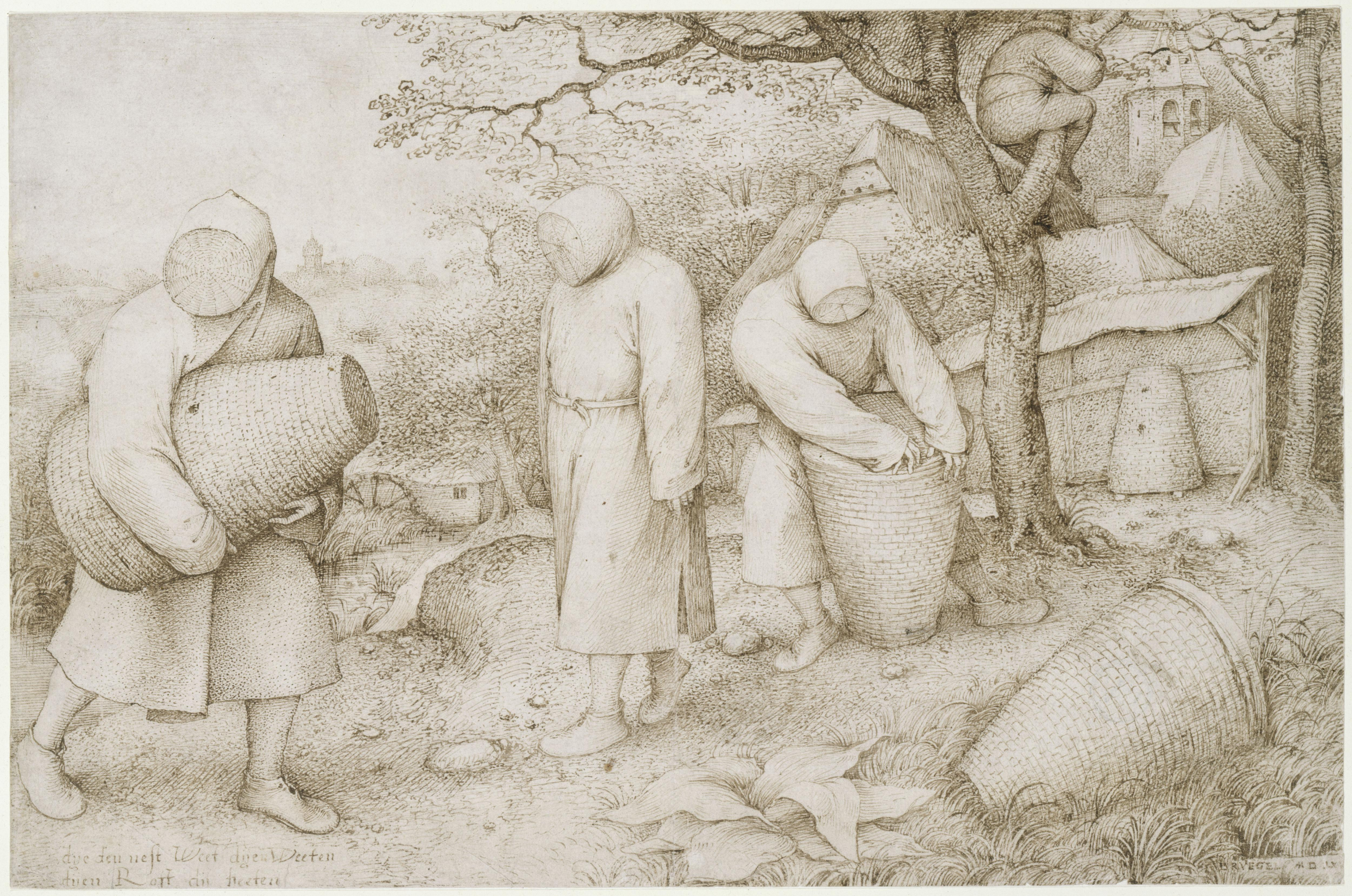
Beekeepers, c. 1568

On his return from Italy to Antwerp, Bruegel earned his living producing drawings to be turned into prints for the leading print publisher of the city, and indeed northern Europe, Hieronymus Cock. At his "House of the Four Winds", Cock ran a production and distribution operation, efficiently producing prints of many sorts that were more concerned with sales than the finest artistic achievement. Most of Bruegel's prints come from this period, but he continued to produce drawn designs for prints until the end of his life, leaving only two completed out of a series of the Four Seasons. The prints were popular and it is reasonable to assume that all those published have survived. In many cases, Bruegel's drawings also exist. Although the subject matter of his graphic work was often continued in his paintings, there are considerable differences in emphases between the two oeuvres. To his contemporaries and for long after, until public museums and good reproductions of the paintings made these better known, Bruegel was much better known through his prints than his paintings, which largely explains the critical assessment of him as merely the creator of comic peasant scenes.

The prints are mostly engravings, though from about 1559 onwards some are etchings or mixtures of both techniques. Only one complete woodcut was made from a Bruegel design, with another left incomplete. This, The Dirty Wife, is a most unusual survival (now Metropolitan Museum of Art) of a drawing on the wooden block intended for printing. For some reason, the specialist block-cutter who carved away the block, following the drawing while also destroying it, had only done one corner of the design before stopping work. The design then appears as an engraving, perhaps soon after Bruegel's death.

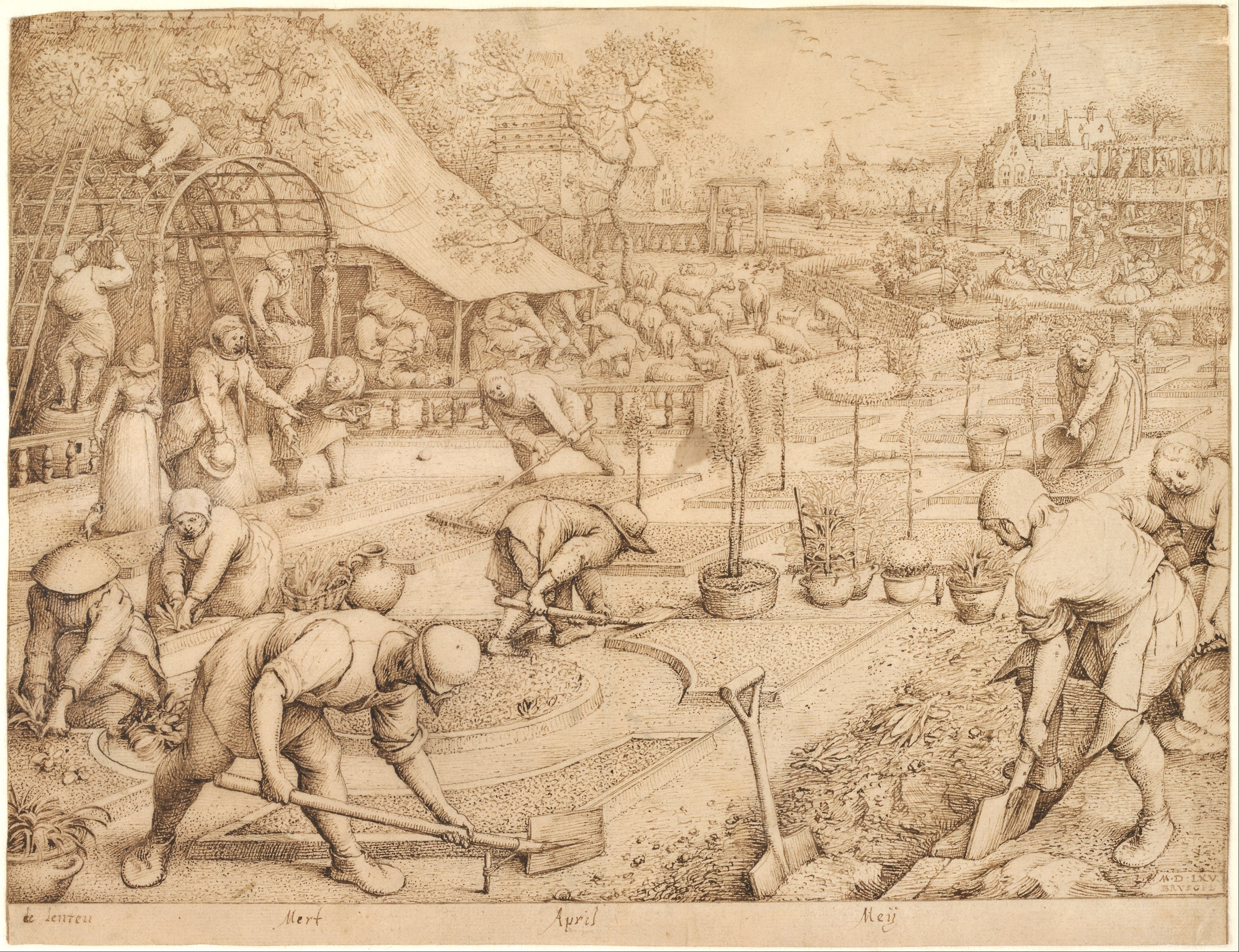
Spring, 1565, a drawing made to be engraved. It was apparently never painted by Bruegel himself, but after his death came dozens of versions in paint by his son and others.

Among his greatest successes were a series of allegories, among several designs adopting many of the very individual mannerisms of his compatriot Hieronymus Bosch: The Seven Deadly Sins and The Virtues. The sinners are grotesque and unidentifiable while the allegories of virtue often wear odd headgear. That imitations of Bosch sold well is demonstrated by his drawing Big Fish Eat Little Fish (held in the Albertina museum collection), which Bruegel signed but Cock shamelessly attributed to Bosch in the print version.

Although Bruegel presumably made them, no drawings that are clearly preparatory studies for paintings survive. Most surviving drawings are finished designs for prints, or landscape drawings that are fairly finished. After a considerable purge of attributions in recent decades, led by Hans Mielke, sixty-one sheets of drawings are now generally agreed to be by Bruegel. A new "Master of the Mountain Landscapes" has emerged from the carnage. Mielke's key observation was that the lily watermark on the paper of several sheets was only found from around 1580 onwards, which led to the rapid acceptance of his proposal. Another group of about twenty-five pen drawings of landscapes, many signed and dated as by Bruegel, are now attributed to Jacob Savery, probably from the decade of so before his death in 1603. A giveaway was that two drawings, including the walls of Amsterdam, were dated 1563 but included elements only built in the 1590s. This group appears to have been made as deliberate forgeries.

== Family ==
Around 1563, Bruegel moved from Antwerp to Brussels, where he married Mayken Coecke, the daughter of the painter Pieter Coecke van Aelst and Mayken Verhulst. As registered in the archives of the Cathedral of Antwerp, their deposition for marriage was registered on 25 July 1563. The marriage was concluded in the Chapel Church, Brussels in 1563.

Pieter the Elder had two sons: Pieter Brueghel the Younger and Jan Brueghel the Elder (both kept their name as Brueghel). Their grandmother, Mayken Verhulst, trained the sons because "the Elder" died when both were very small children. The older brother, Pieter Brueghel, copied his father's style and compositions with competence and considerable commercial success. Jan was much more original and very versatile. He was an important figure in the transition to the Baroque style in Flemish Baroque painting and Dutch Golden Age painting in a number of its genres. He was often a collaborator with other leading artists, including with Peter Paul Rubens on many works, including the Allegory of Sight.

Other members of the family include Jan van Kessel the Elder (grandson of Jan Brueghel the Elder) and Jan van Kessel the Younger. Through David Teniers the Younger, son-in-law of Jan Brueghel the Elder, the family is also related to the whole Teniers family of painters and the Quellinus family of painters and sculptors, through the marriage of Jan-Erasmus Quellinus to Cornelia, daughter of David Teniers the Younger.

Brueghel family tree

Pieter Bruegel the Elder
Pieter Brueghel the Younger	Jan Brueghel the Elder
Ambrosius Brueghel	Jan Brueghel the Younger	Anna Brueghel x David Teniers the Younger	Paschasia Brueghel	Hieronymous van Kessel the Younger
Jan Pieter Brueghel	Abraham Brueghel	Jan Baptist Brueghel	Jan van Kessel the Elder

== Political meanings ==
There are still major differences of opinion about the meaning of his 'allegorical' paintings, and whether Bruegel's more enigmatic scenes, such as The Massacre of the Innocents at Bethlehem, The Fall of Icarus or Mad Meg are much more than illustrations of stories from the Bible, mythology or popular theatre. There is little doubt that these paintings contain several layers of meaning. However, there is no consensus on whether these deeper meanings, in addition to all kinds of references to proverbs and sayings and in moralising rhetoricians wisdom, should also be sought in satirical commentaries on current events or situations.

Political interpretations of Bruegel's works are still particularly sensitive, and opposed by specialists such as Roger Marijnissen and Manfred Sellink. Only one painting, namely The Preaching of John the Baptist, was the subject of consensus that it may have been inspired by a Protestant hedge sermon that Bruegel is said to have attended at Brussels in 1566. The Procession to Calvary and The Conversion of Saul have also often been associated with the struggle against the religious reformers, with various degrees of success.

In his 2025 study The Bruegel Code, however, classicist Leo Spaepen finds that Bruegel critically followed the entire escalation of the religious and political conflict in the Netherlands in no fewer than fifteen of his paintings. To do this, he relates all these works chronologically with contemporary history, from the outbreak of the Huguenot War in France to the first battles of the Eighty Years' War. This method made clear the coherence of a considerable part of Bruegel's works, that at first sight could be perceived as rather disparate. With detailed analysis, he interprets the mysterious Mad Meg as a giant cartoon (avant la lettre) about the persecution policy of governor Margaretha (Griet) of Parma. In all these allegories, the author found the same modus operandi: Bruegel mixed two stories together on the basis of association. By making such comparisons between a current and a well known story, the artist was able to insert implicit comments into his paintings.

Discussing Brughel's religion, many indications point in the direction of possible heretical sympathies. In particular, from 1562 onwards, Bruegel is said to have fallen under the spell of the German mystic Hendrik Niclaes and his spiritualist and pacifist ideas. Contact with his writings would first of all have given rise to a caesura in the artist's private life: his farewell to an old lover and his marriage to Mayken Coecke would bear witness to The two Monkeys and The Flight to Egypt. Furthermore, it is also said to have been under the influence of Niclaes' allegorical utopia Terra Pacis (The Land of Peace) that Bruegel took a striking pacifist course with his work in 1562. According to Spaepen, the motifs of confusion and blindness, which are strongly present in Bruegel's paintings, may be indebted to Niclaes' book, as is the process of proclaiming his ideas in the form of parables.

== Reception history ==
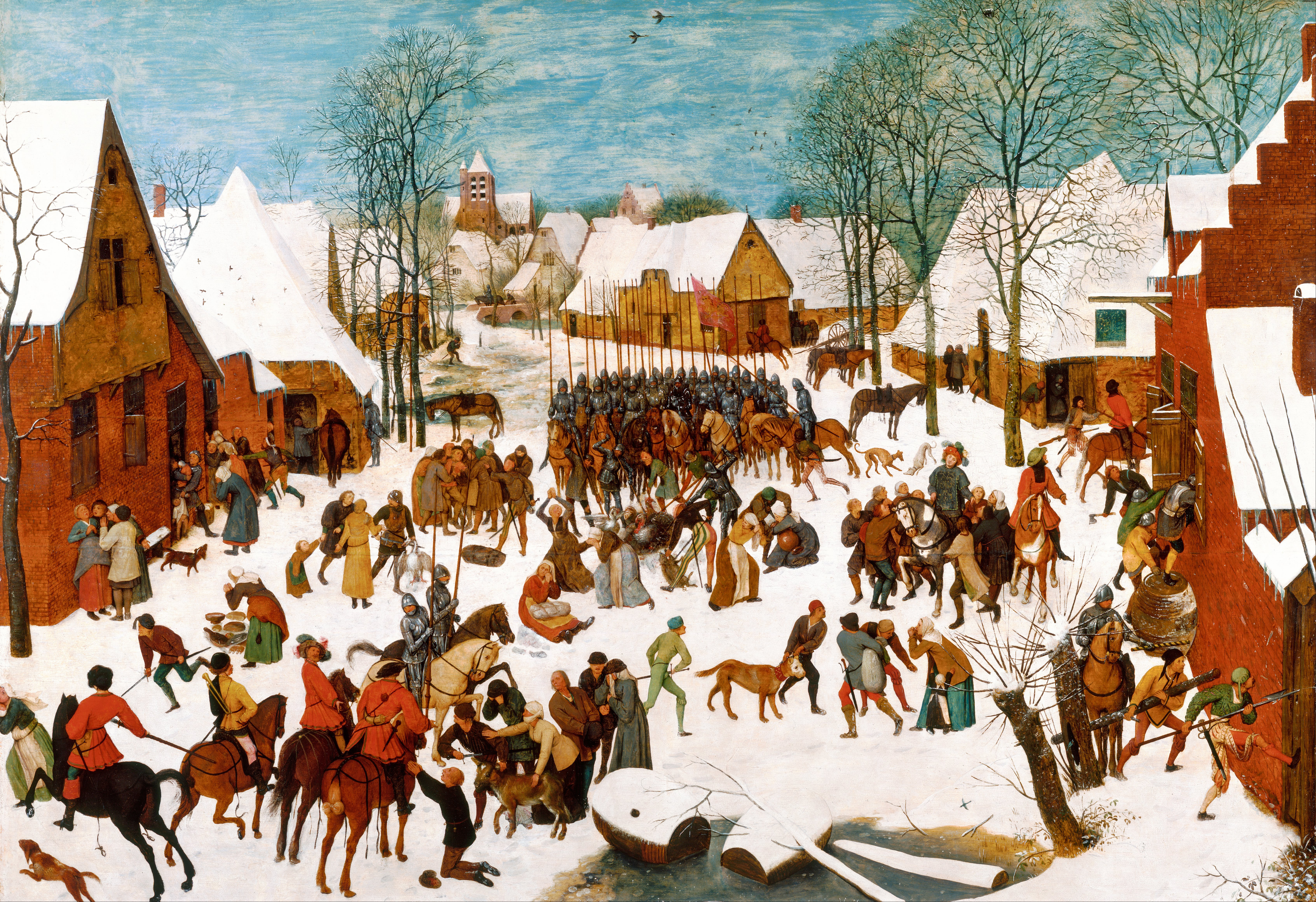
Massacre of the Innocents, (c. 1565–1567), British Royal Collection; a much-copied painting

Bruegel's art was long more highly valued by collectors than critics. His friend Abraham Ortelius described him in a friendship album in 1574 as "the most perfect painter of his century", but both Vasari and Van Mander see him as essentially a comic successor to Hieronymus Bosch. As well as being forward-looking, his art reinvigorates medieval subjects such as marginal drolleries of ordinary life in illuminated manuscripts, and the calendar scenes of agricultural labours set in landscape backgrounds, and puts these on a much larger scale than before, and in the expensive medium of oil painting. He does the same with the fantastic and anarchic world developed in Renaissance prints and book illustrations.

Bruegel's work was, as far as we know, always keenly collected. The banker Nicolaes Jonghelinck owned sixteen paintings; his brother Jacques Jonghelinck was a gentleman-sculptor and medallist, who also had significant business interests. He made medals and tombs in an international style for the Brussels elite, especially Cardinal Granvelle, who was also a keen patron of Bruegel. Granvelle owned at least two Bruegels, including the Courtauld Flight into Egypt, but we do not know if he bought them directly from the artist. Granvelle's nephew and heir was strong-armed out of his Bruegels by Rudolf II, the very acquisitive Austrian Habsburg Emperor. The series of the Months entered the Habsburg collections in 1594, given to Rudolf's brother and later taken by the emperor himself. Rudolf eventually owned at least ten Bruegel paintings. A generation later Rubens owned eleven or twelve, which mostly passed to the Antwerp senator Pieter Stevens, and were then sold in 1668.

Winter Landscape with (Skaters and) a Bird Trap (1565), Bruegel's most copied painting, smaller than many of his landscapes at 38 × 56 cm

Bruegel's son Pieter could still keep himself and a large studio team busy producing replicas or adaptations of Bruegel's works, as well as his own compositions along similar lines, sixty years or more after they were first painted. The most frequently copied works were generally not the ones that are most famous today, though this may reflect the availability of the full-scale, detailed drawings that were evidently used. The most-copied painting is the Winter Landscape with (Skaters and) a Bird Trap (1565), of which the original is in Brussels; 127 copies are recorded. They include paintings after some of Bruegel's drawn print designs, especially Spring.

The next century's artists of peasant genre scenes were heavily influenced by Brueghel. Outside the Brueghel family, early figures were Adriaen Brouwer (c. 1605/6 – 1638) and David Vinckboons (1576 – c. 1632), both Flemish-born but spending much of their time in the northern Netherlands. As well as the general conception of such kermis subjects, Vinckboons and other artists took from Bruegel "such stylistic devices as the bird's-eye perspective, ornamentalised vegetation, bright palette, and stocky, odious figures." Forty years after their deaths, and more than a century after Bruegel's, Jan Steen (1626–79) continued to show a particular interest in Bruegelian treatments.

The critical treatment of Bruegel as essentially an artist of comic peasant scenes persisted until the late 19th century, even after his best paintings became widely visible as royal and aristocratic collections were turned into museums. This had been partly explicable when his work was mainly known from copies, prints, and reproductions. Even Henri Hymans, whose work of 1890/1891 was the first important contribution to modern Bruegel scholarship, could describe him thus: "His field of enquiry is certainly not of the most extensive; his ambition, too, is modest. He confines himself to a knowledge of mankind and the most immediate objects", a line no modern scholar is likely to take. As his landscape paintings, in good colour reproduction, have become his best-loved works, so his importance in the history of landscape art has become understood.

== Works ==
There are about forty generally accepted surviving paintings, twelve of which are in the Kunsthistorisches Museum in Vienna. Others are known to have been lost, including what, according to van Mander, Bruegel himself thought his best work, "a picture in which Truth triumphs".

Bruegel only etched one plate himself, The Rabbit Hunt, but designed some forty prints, both engravings and etchings, mostly for the Cock publishing house. As discussed above, about sixty-one drawings are now recognised as authentic, mostly designs for prints or landscapes.

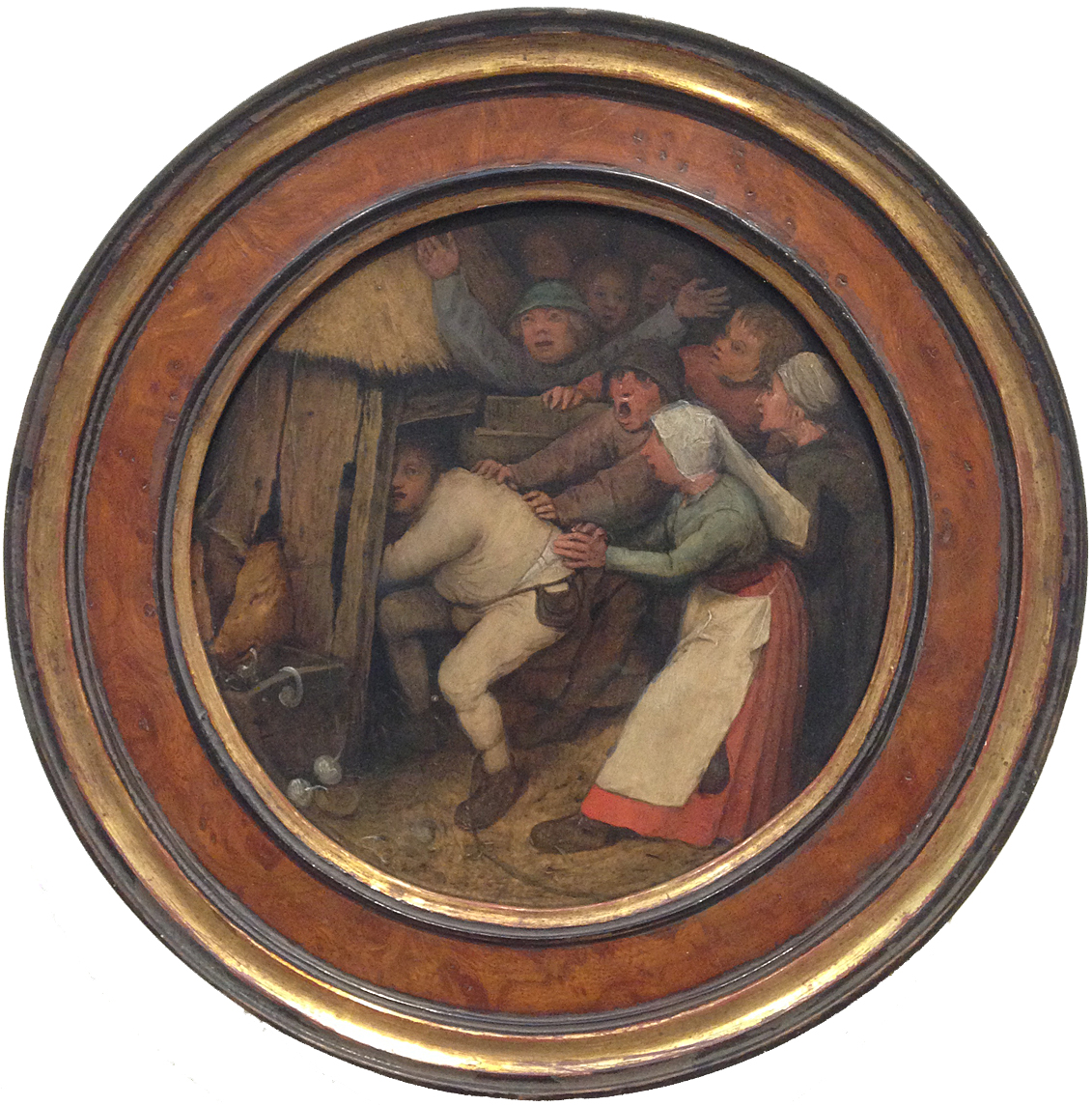
A Pig Has to Go in a Sty (1557), Bruegel's earliest genre scene, private collection

The Fall of the Rebel Angels (1562), Royal Museums of Fine Arts of Belgium

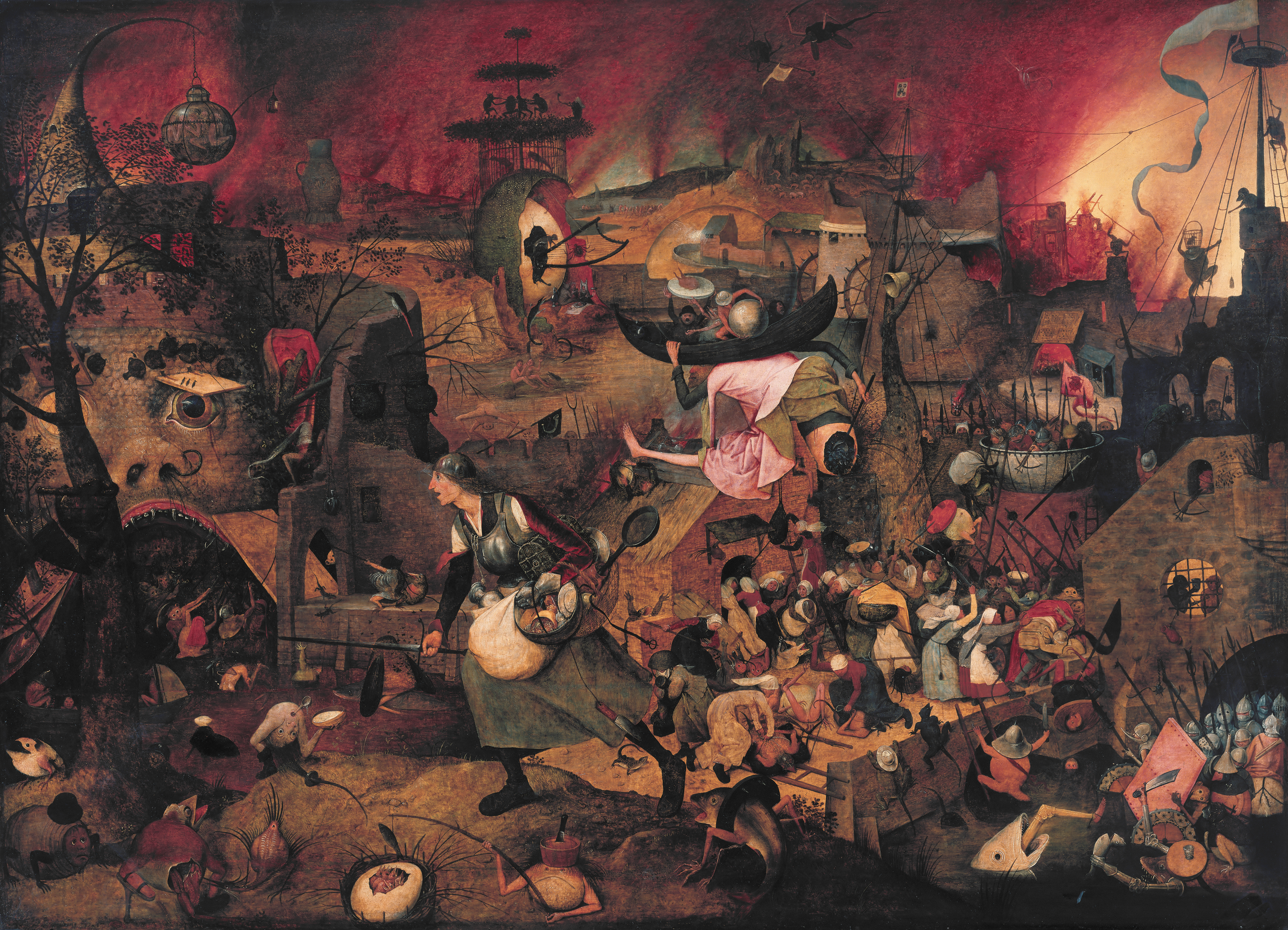
Dulle Griet (1563), Museum Mayer van den Bergh, Antwerp

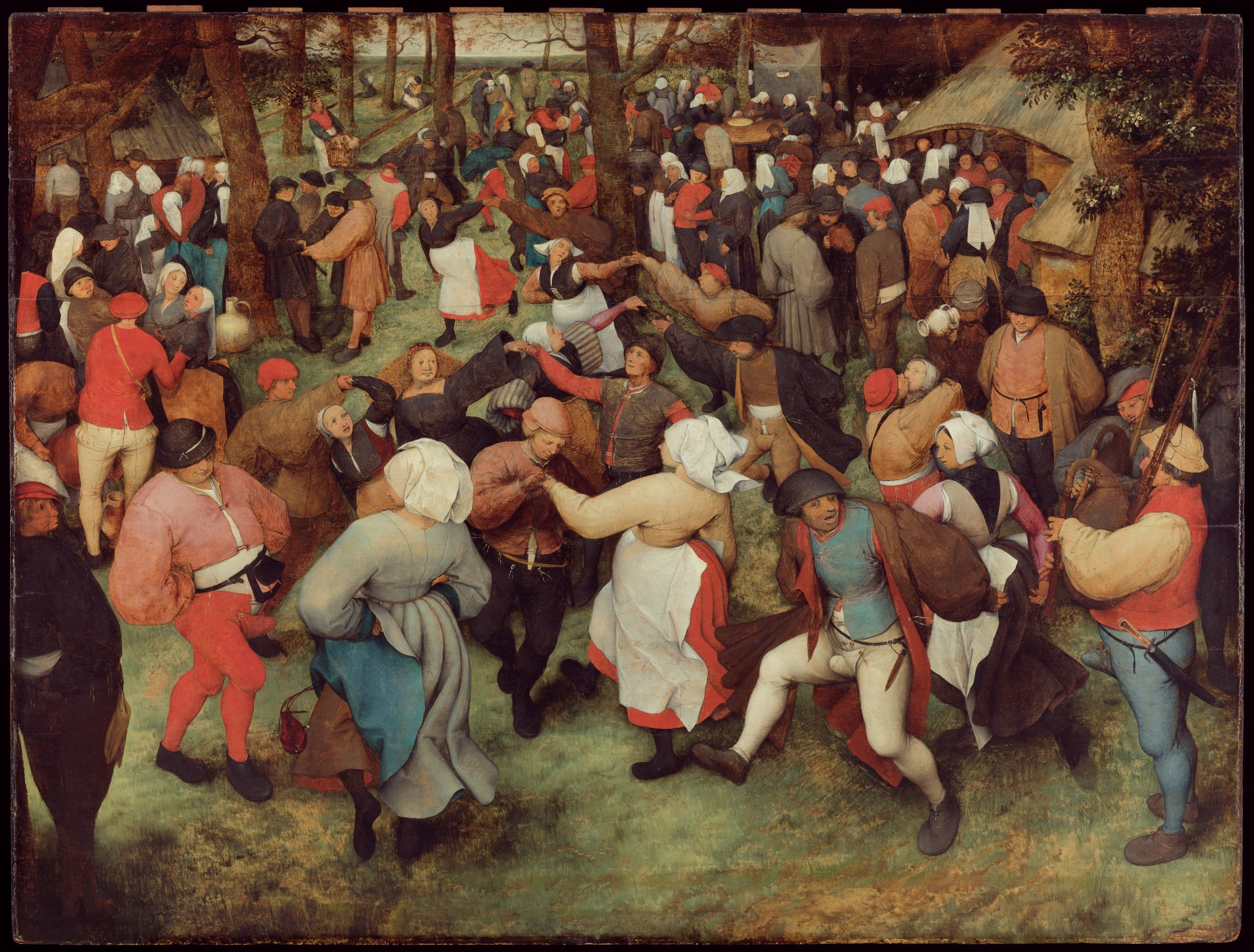
The Wedding Dance (1566), oil on oak panel, The Detroit Institute of Arts

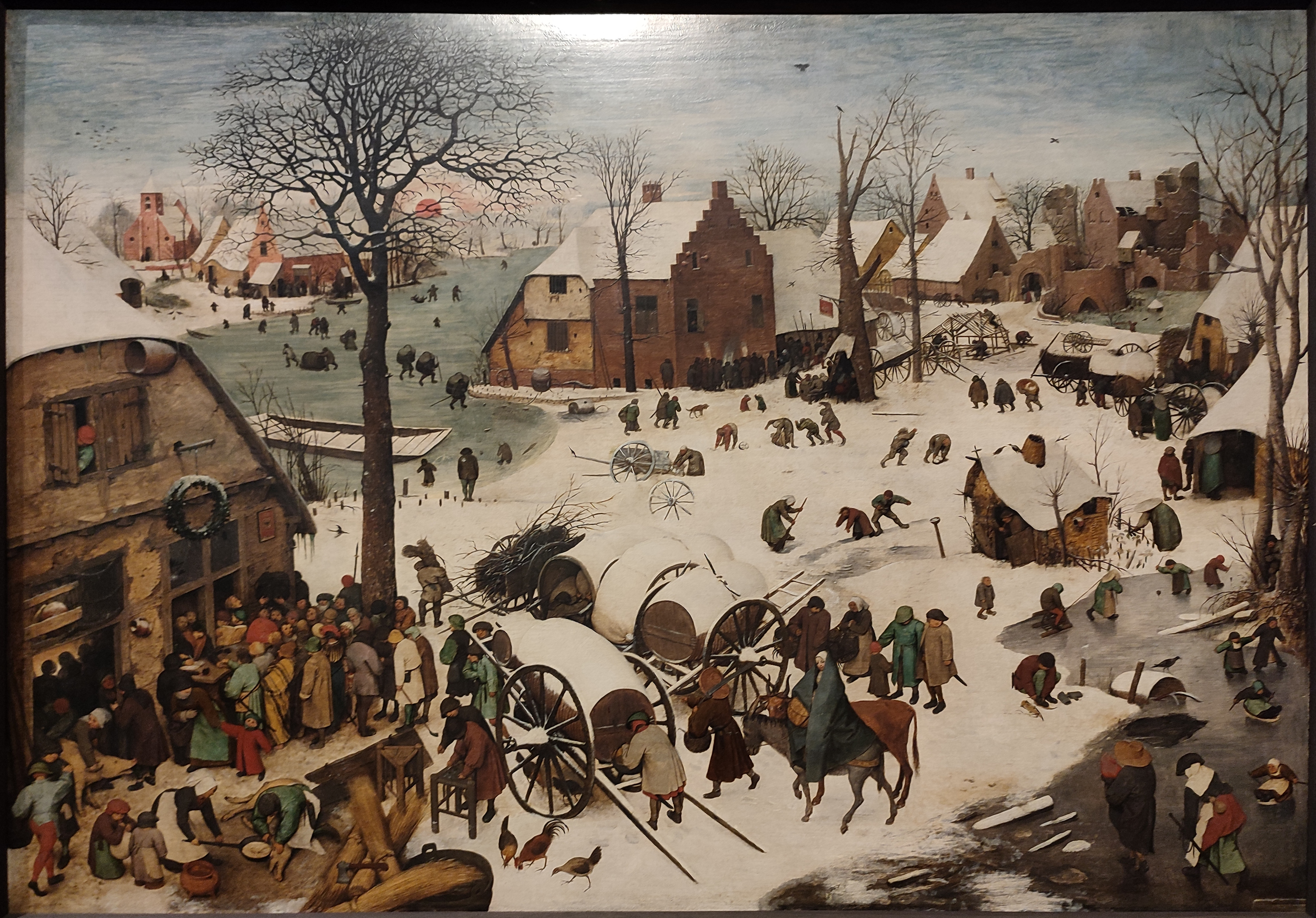
The Census at Bethlehem (1566), oil on wood panel, Royal Museums of Fine Arts of Belgium

== Selected works ==
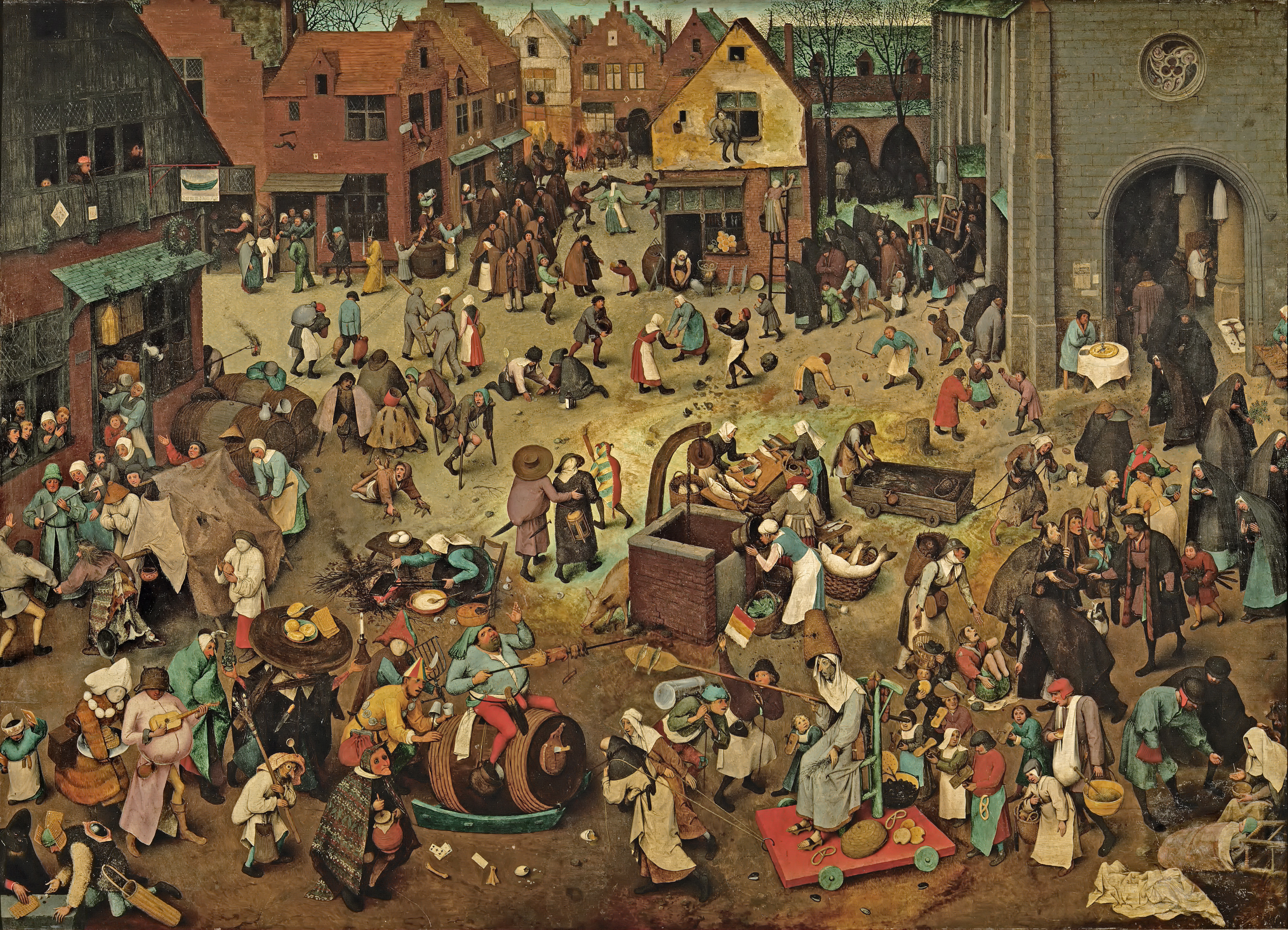
The Fight Between Carnival and Lent (1559) Kunsthistorisches Museum, Vienna

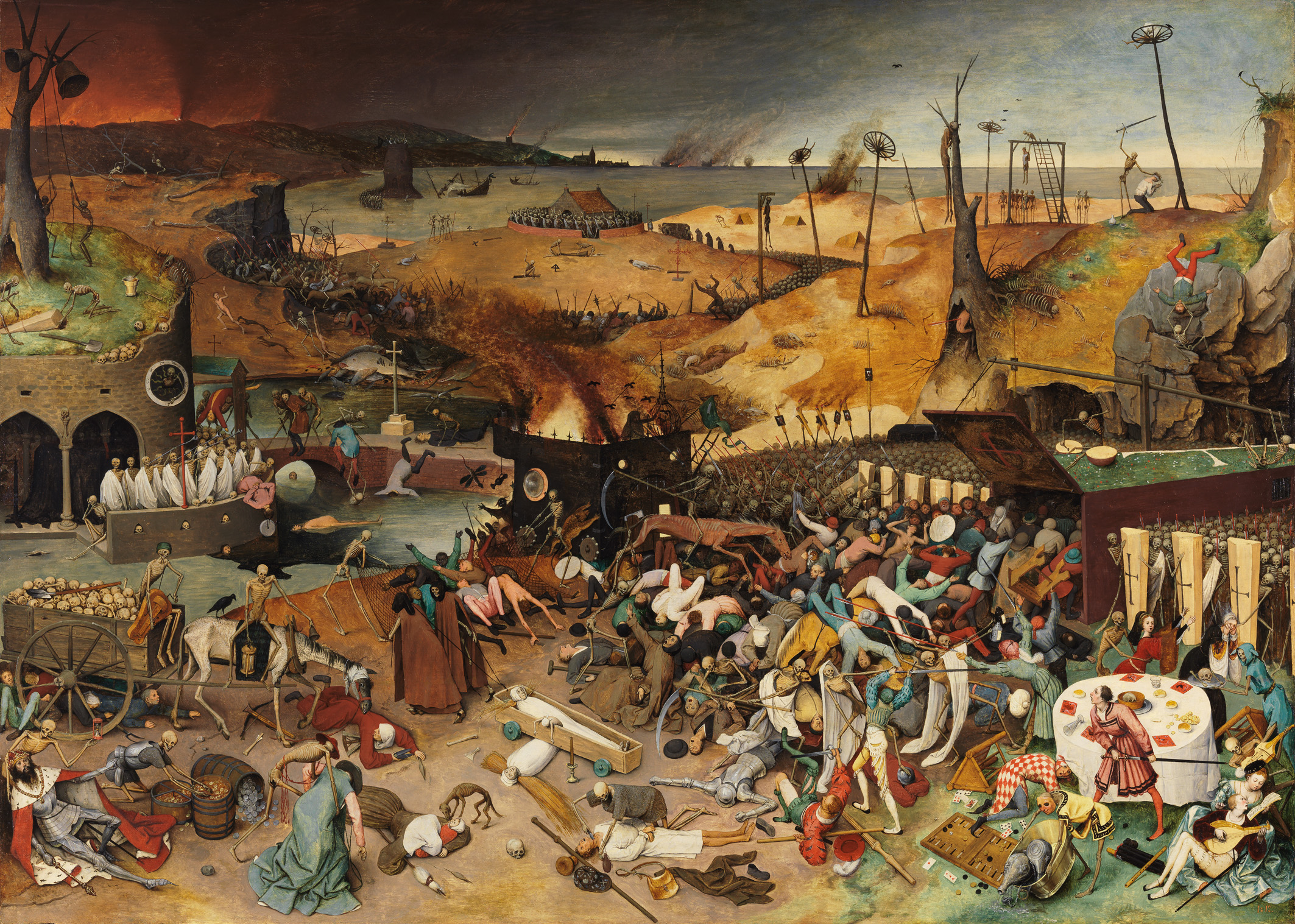
The Triumph of Death (c. 1562), Museo del Prado, Madrid

- Landscape with Christ and the Apostles at the Sea of Tiberias, 1553, probably with Maarten de Vos, private collection
- Parable of the Sower, 1557, Timken Museum of Art, San Diego
- Twelve Proverbs, 1558, Museum Mayer van den Bergh, Antwerp
- Netherlandish Proverbs, 1559, Gemäldegalerie, Berlin. (Originally titled The Blue Cloak.)
- The Fight Between Carnival and Lent, 1559, Kunsthistorisches Museum, Vienna
- Portrait of an Old Woman, 1560, Alte Pinakothek, Munich
- Temperance, 1560
- Children's Games, 1560, Kunsthistorisches Museum, Vienna
- Naval Battle in the Gulf of Naples, 1560, Galleria Doria-Pamphilj, Rome
- The Fall of the Rebel Angels 1562, Royal Museums of Fine Arts of Belgium, Brussels

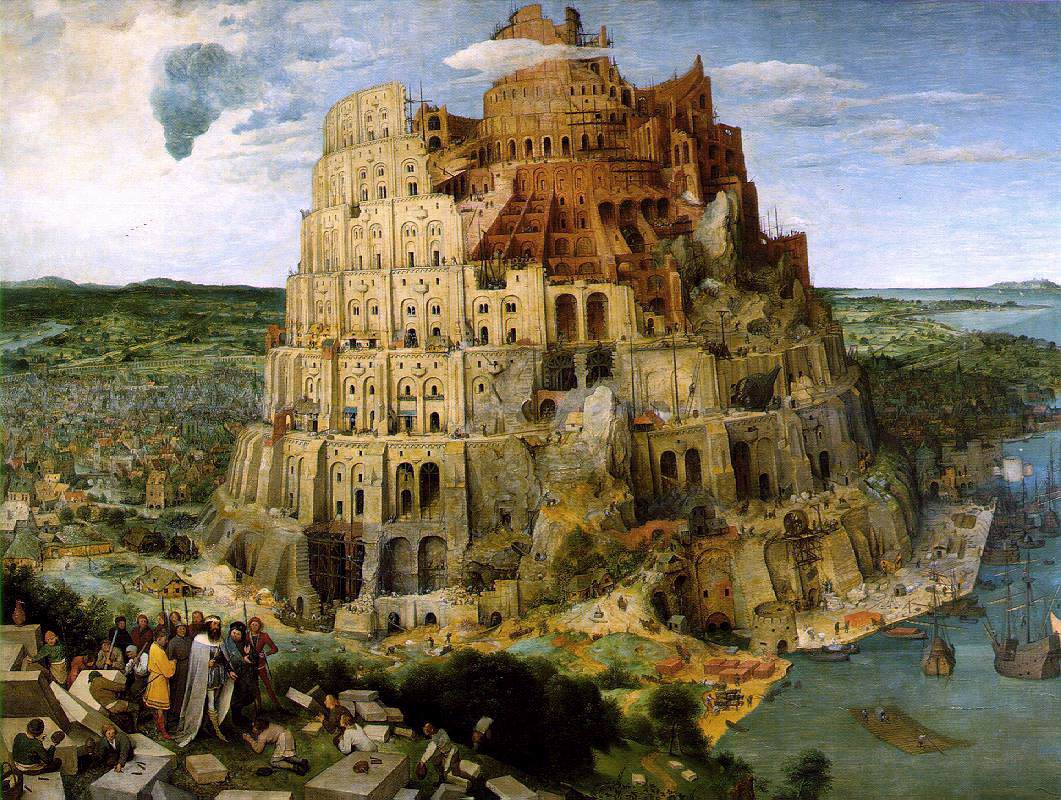
The Tower of Babel (1563, large version), Kunsthistorisches Museum, Vienna, oil on panel

- The Suicide of Saul (Battle Against The Philistines on the Gilboa), 1562, Kunsthistorisches Museum, Vienna
- Two Monkeys, 1562, Staatliche Museen, Gemäldegalerie, Berlin
- The Triumph of Death, c. 1562, Museo del Prado, Madrid
- Dulle Griet (Mad Meg), c. 1563, Museum Mayer van den Bergh, Antwerp
- The "Large" Tower of Babel, 1563, Kunsthistorisches Museum, Vienna
- The "Little" Tower of Babel, c. 1563, Museum Boijmans Van Beuningen, Rotterdam
- Landscape with the Flight into Egypt, 1563, Courtauld Institute Galleries, London
- The Death of the Virgin, 1564, (grisaille), Upton House, Banbury
- Landscape with the Fall of Icarus, probably 1564, Royal Museums of Fine Arts of Belgium, Brussels – Note: Now seen as a copy of a lost authentic Bruegel painting
- The Procession to Calvary, 1564, Kunsthistorisches Museum, Vienna
- The Adoration of the Kings, 1564, The National Gallery, London

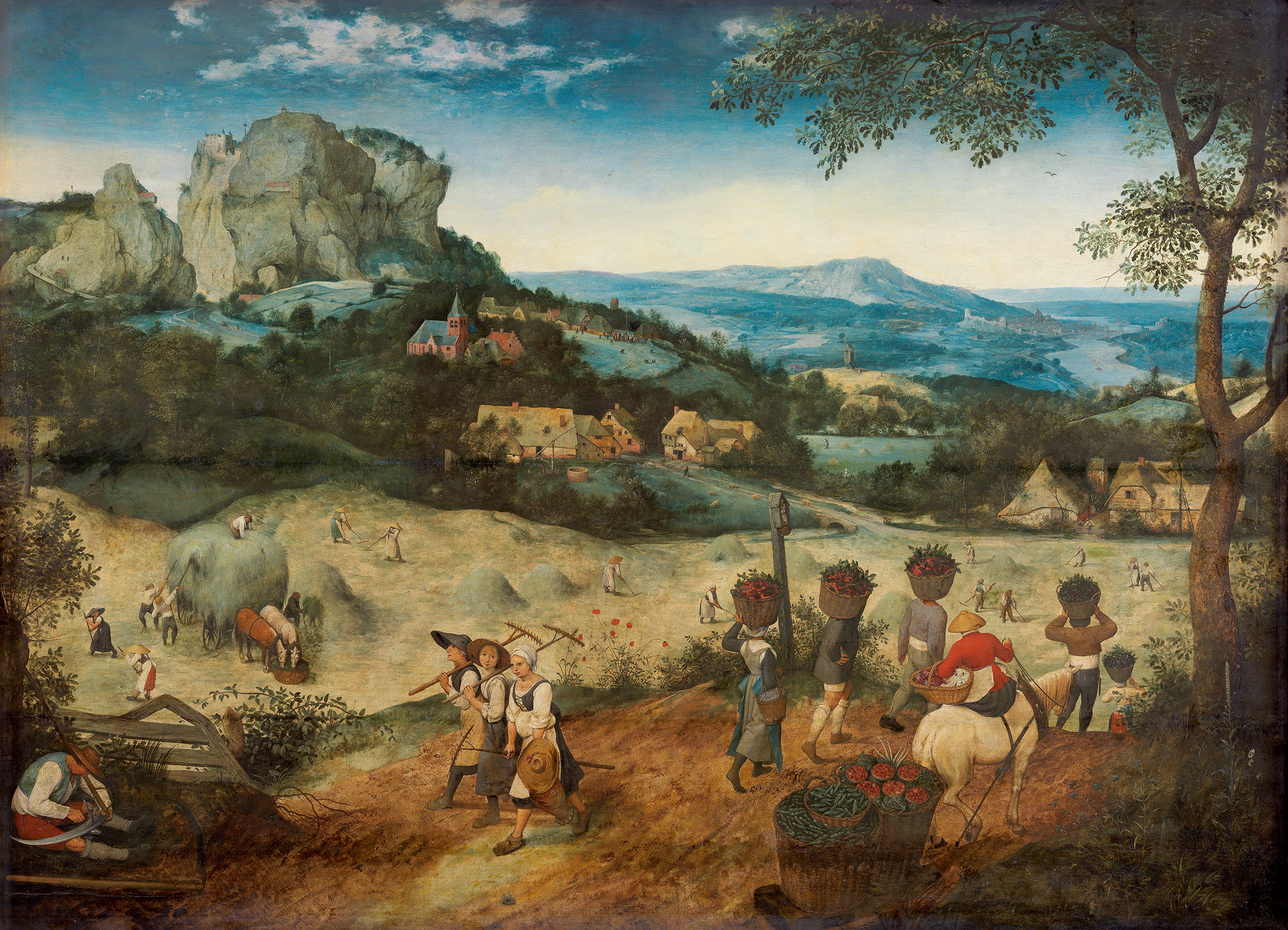
The Hay Harvest (1565), National Museum (Prague), Lobkowicz family collection in Lobkowicz Palace in Prague Castle

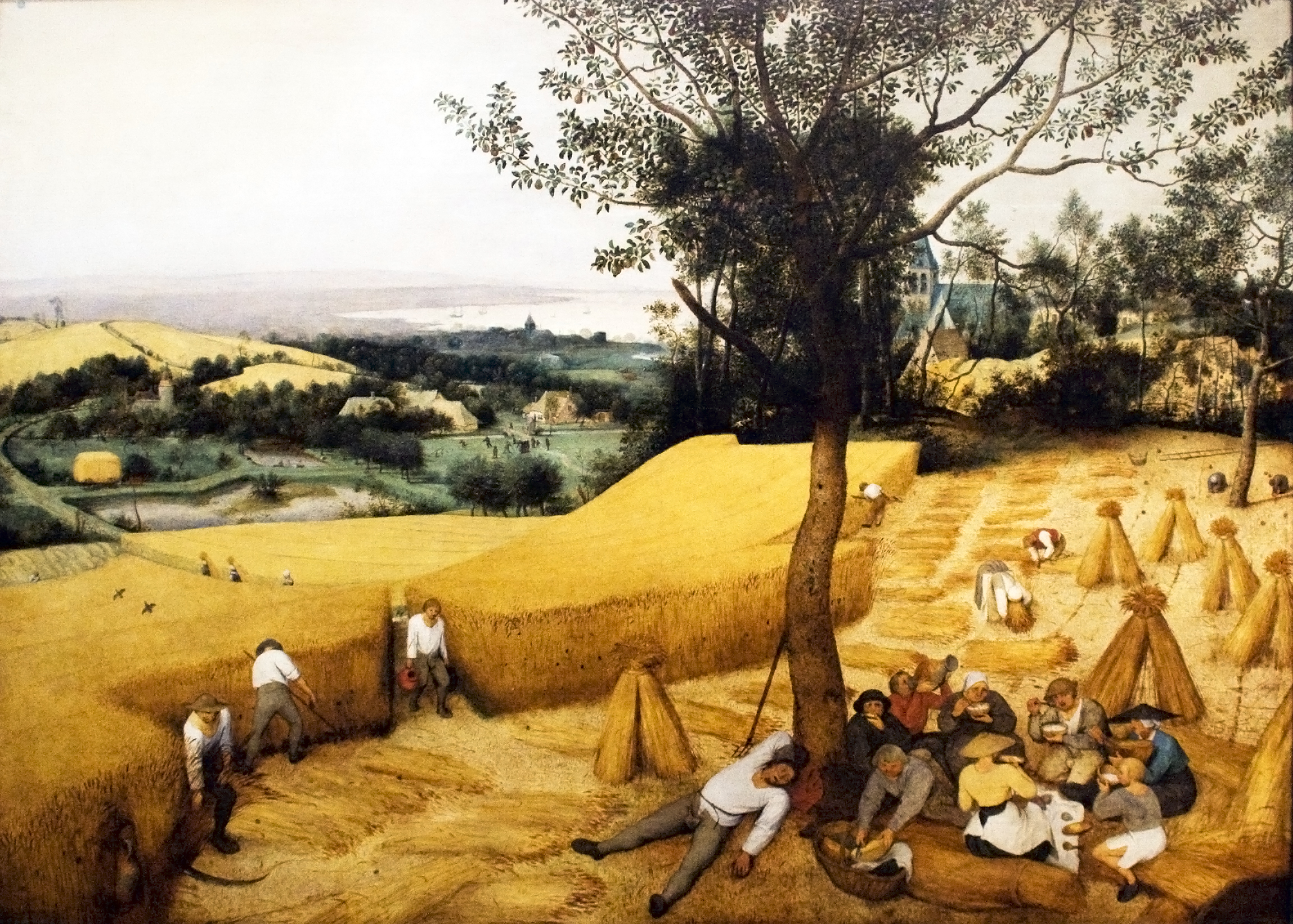
The Harvesters (1565), oil on panel, Metropolitan Museum of Art, New York

- Winter Landscape with a Bird Trap, 1565, Royal Museums of Fine Arts of Belgium, Brussels, inv. 8724
- The Months, a cycle of probably six paintings of the months or seasons, of which five remain:
  - The Hunters in the Snow (Dec.–Jan.), 1565, Kunsthistorisches Museum, Vienna
  - The Gloomy Day (Feb.–Mar.), 1565, Kunsthistorisches Museum, Vienna
  - The Hay Harvest (June–July), 1565, Lobkowicz Palace at the Prague Castle Complex, Czech Republic
  - The Harvesters (Aug.-Sept.), 1565, Metropolitan Museum of Art, New York
  - The Return of the Herd (Oct.–Nov.), 1565, Kunsthistorisches Museum, Vienna
- Christ and the Woman Taken in Adultery (1565), Courtauld Institute of Art, London
- Preaching of John the Baptist, 1566, Museum of Fine Arts (Budapest)
- The Census at Bethlehem, 1566, Royal Museums of Fine Arts of Belgium, Brussels
- The Wedding Dance, c. 1566, Detroit Institute of Arts, Detroit
- Conversion of Paul, 1567, Kunsthistorishes Museum, Vienna
- Massacre of the Innocents, c. 1567, versions at Royal Collection, Kunsthistorisches Museum, Vienna, at Brukenthal National Museum, Sibiu, and at Upton House, Banbury
- The Land of Cockaigne, 1567, Alte Pinakothek, Munich
- The Adoration of the Magi in the Snow, 1563, Oskar Reinhart Collection, Winterthur
- The Magpie on the Gallows, 1568, Hessisches Landesmuseum, Darmstadt
- The Misanthrope, 1568, Museo di Capodimonte, Naples
- The Blind Leading the Blind, 1568, Museo Nazionale di Capodimonte, Naples
- The Peasant Wedding, 1568, Kunsthistorisches Museum, Vienna
- The Peasant Dance, 1568, Kunsthistorisches Museum, Vienna
- The Beggars (The Cripples), 1568, Louvre, Paris
- The Peasant and the Nest Robber, 1568, Kunsthistorisches Museum, Vienna
- The Three Soldiers, 1568, The Frick Collection, New York City
- The Storm at Sea, an unfinished work, probably Bruegel's last painting.
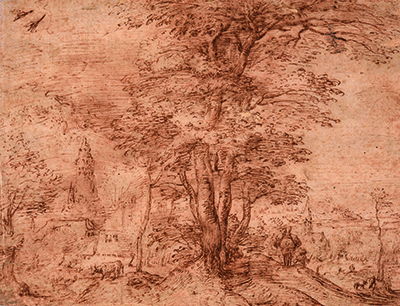
- Village views with trees and a mule, 1526–1569, The Phoebus Foundation
  The Wine of Saint Martin's Day, Museo del Prado, Madrid (discovered in 2010)

Prints and drawings

- Large Fish Eat Small Fish, 1556; we have both Bruegel's design and prints after it
- Ass at School, 1556, drawing, Print room, Berlin State Museums
- The Calumny of Apelles, 1565, drawing, British Museum, London
- The Painter and the Connoisseur, drawing, c. 1565, Albertina, Vienna
- Village views with trees and a mule, 1526–1569, The Phoebus Foundation

== References in other works ==
=== In literature ===
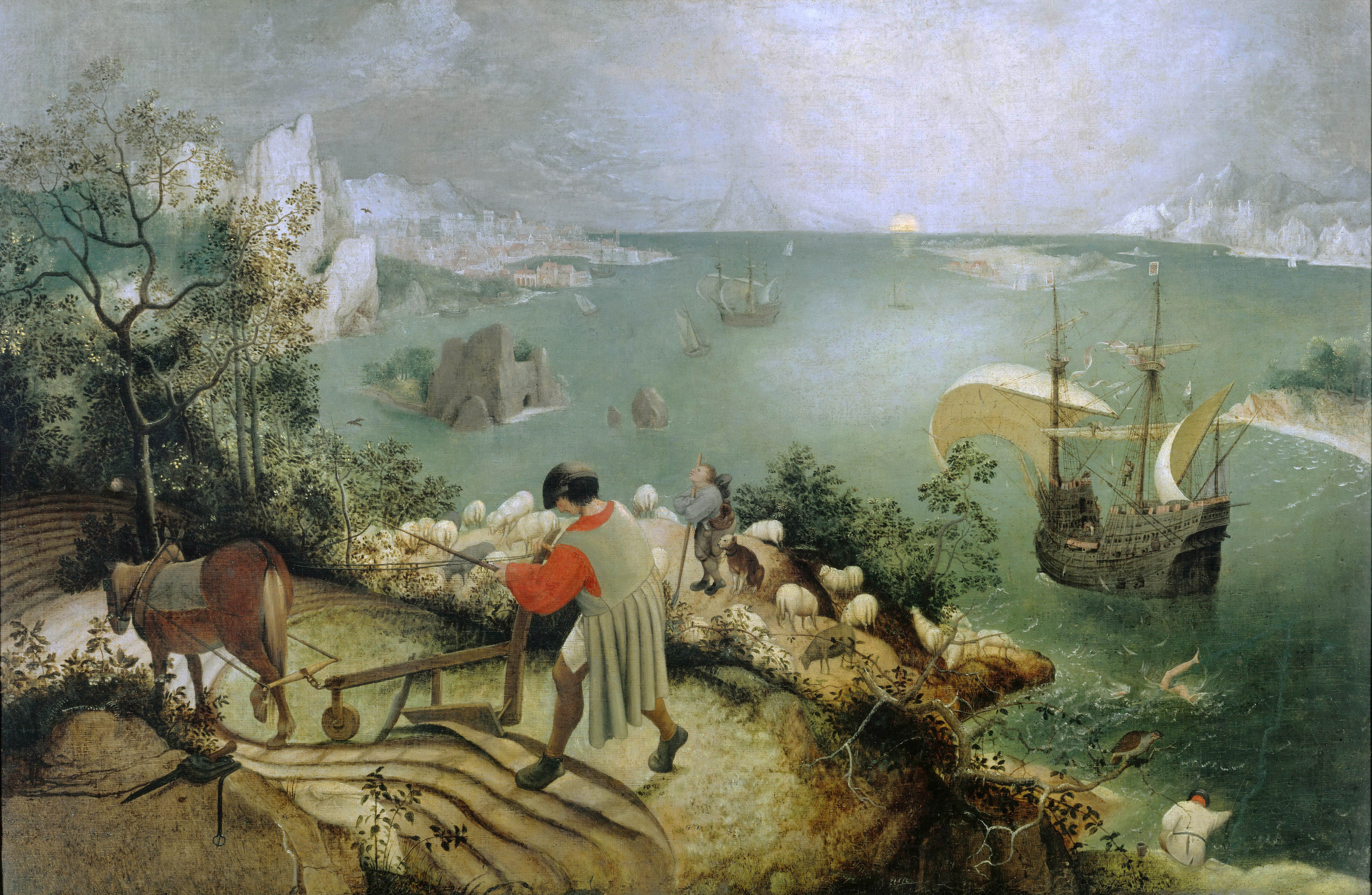
Landscape with the Fall of Icarus, probably an early copy of Bruegel's lost original, c. 1558

His painting Landscape with the Fall of Icarus, now thought only to survive in copies, is the subject of the final lines of the 1938 poem "Musée des Beaux Arts" by W. H. Auden:

In Brueghel's Icarus, for instance: how everything turns away
Quite leisurely from the disaster; the ploughman
Have heard the splash, the forsaken cry,
But for him it was not an important failure; the sun shone
As it had to on the white legs disappearing into the green
Water, and the expensive delicate ship that must have seen
Something amazing, a boy falling out of the sky,
Had somewhere to get to and sailed calmly on.

It also was the subject of a 1960 poem "Landscape with the Fall of Icarus" by William Carlos Williams, and was mentioned in Nicolas Roeg's 1976 science fiction film The Man Who Fell to Earth. Williams' final collection of poetry alludes to several of Bruegel's works.

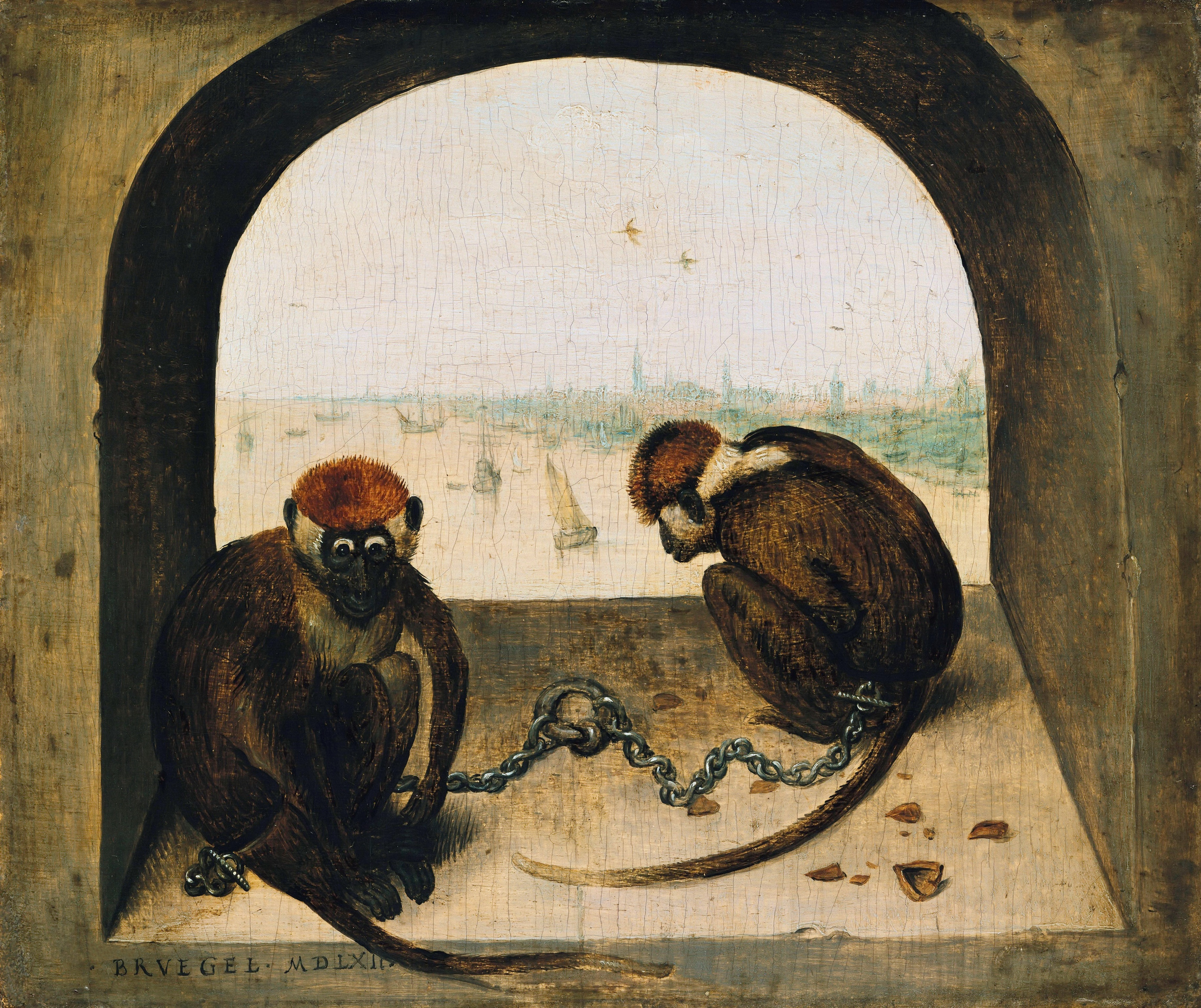
Two Monkeys, 1562, oil on panel

Bruegel's painting Two Monkeys was the subject of Wisława Szymborska's 1957 poem, "Brueghel's Two Monkeys".

Seamus Heaney refers to Brueghel in his poem "The Seed Cutters". David Jones alludes to the painting The Blind Leading the Blind in his World War One prose-poem In Parenthesis: "the stumbling dark of the blind, that Breughel knew about – ditch circumscribed".

Michael Frayn's novel Headlong, imagines a lost panel from the 1565 Months series resurfacing unrecognised, which triggers a conflict between an art (and money) lover and the boor who possesses it. Much thought is spent on Bruegel's secret motives for painting it.

Author Don Delillo uses Bruegel's painting The Triumph of Death in his novel Underworld and his short story "Pafko at the Wall". It is believed that the painting The Hunters in the Snow influenced the classic short story with the same title written by Tobias Wolff and featured in In the Garden of the North American Martyrs.

In the foreword to his novel The Folly of the World, author Jesse Bullington explains that Bruegel's painting Netherlandish Proverbs inspired the title and also the plot to some extent. Various sections are introduced with a proverb depicted in the painting that alludes to a plot element.

Poet Sylvia Plath refers to Bruegel's painting The Triumph of Death in her poem "Two Views of a Cadaver Room", from her 1960 collection The Colossus and Other Poems.

=== In film ===
Russian film director Andrei Tarkovsky refers to Bruegel's paintings in his films several times, notably in Solaris (1972) and The Mirror (1975).

Director Lars von Trier also uses Bruegel's paintings in his film Melancholia (2011). This was used as a reference to Tarkovsky's Solaris, a movie with related themes.

Bruegel's 1564 painting The Procession to Calvary inspired the 2011 Polish-Swedish film co-production The Mill and the Cross, in which Bruegel is played by Rutger Hauer. Bruegel's paintings in the Kunsthistorisches Museum are featured in the 2012 film, Museum Hours, where his work is discussed in conversations between a security guard at the museum and a visitor from Montreal who is visiting a hospitalised relative, and takes time off between hospital visits to visit the museum. Some scenes feature tour guides who present their analysis and interpretation of Bruegel's paintings.

=== In music ===
The album cover of Fleet Foxes' debut self-titled LP features Bruegel's 1559 masterpiece Netherlandish Proverbs, a decision made by vocalist/guitarist Robin Pecknold. In an interview with Mojo, Pecknold noted that he drew inspiration from the painting after seeing it in a book, and viewed it as an appropriate allegory to the album's dense – but unified – sound. Pecknold further added that the Gemäldegalerie, which houses the painting, was thrilled to have the work featured on a contemporary record. The cover claimed the Best Art Vinyl Award 2008, an annual award organised by Artvinyl.com.

The British post rock group known as Black Midi used a print by Bruegel for the 2019 release of their first single "Talking Heads." The cover features Bruegel's print "The Battle About Money", which was published posthumously in 1570.

In 2026, British composer Nigel Clarke (composer) released a CD "Breug[h]el's Brush", containing 25 miniatures for solo violin and solo viola, each of which relates to one of 25 paintings by Peter Breugel and other members of the Breugel family exhibited at the Royal Museum of Fine Arts in Brussels.

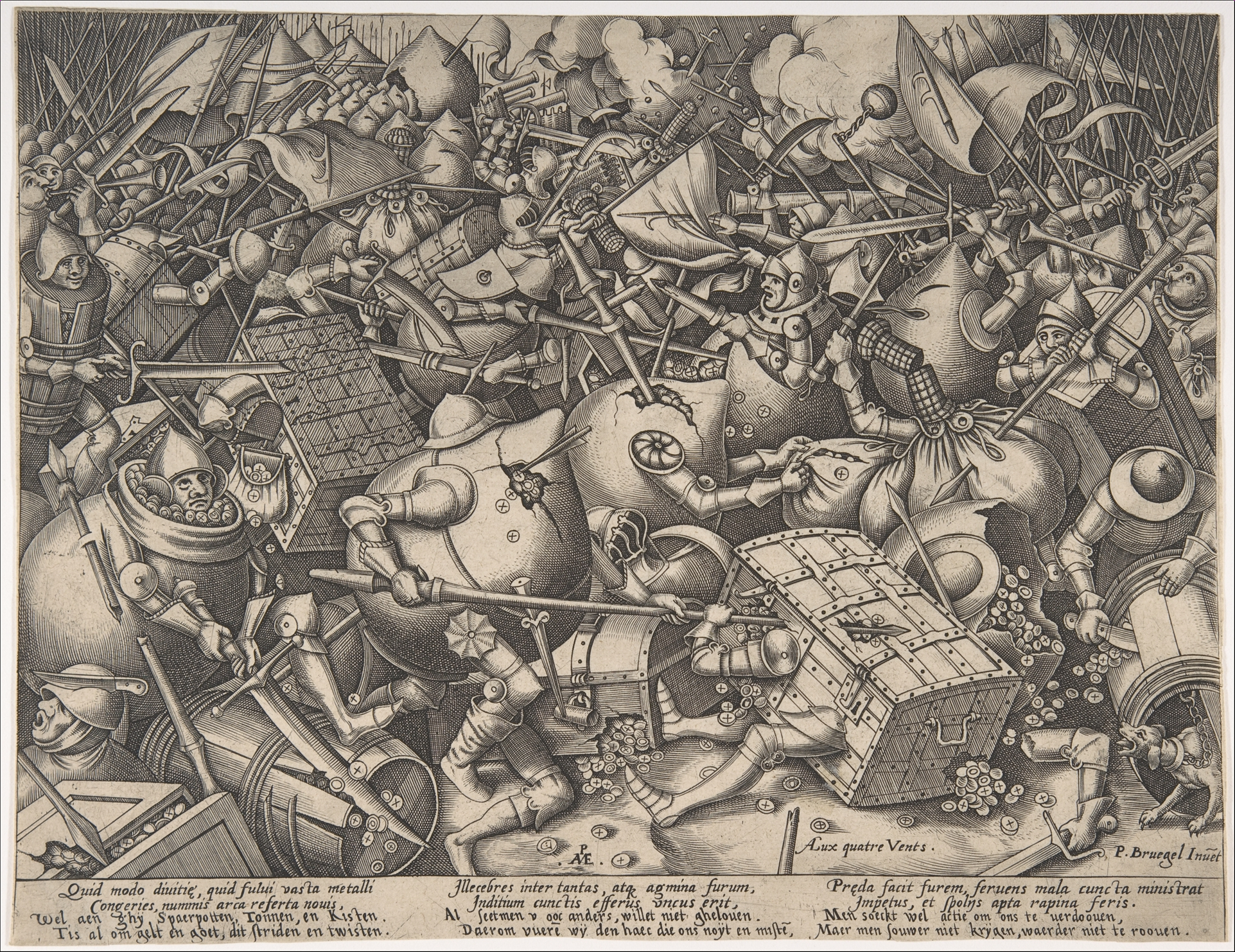
The Battle About Money

== See also ==
- List of paintings by Pieter Bruegel the Elder
- Early Netherlandish painting
- Dutch and Flemish Renaissance painting
