= Landscape with the Flight into Egypt (Bruegel) =

Painting by Pieter Bruegel the Elder

- The Flight into Egypt
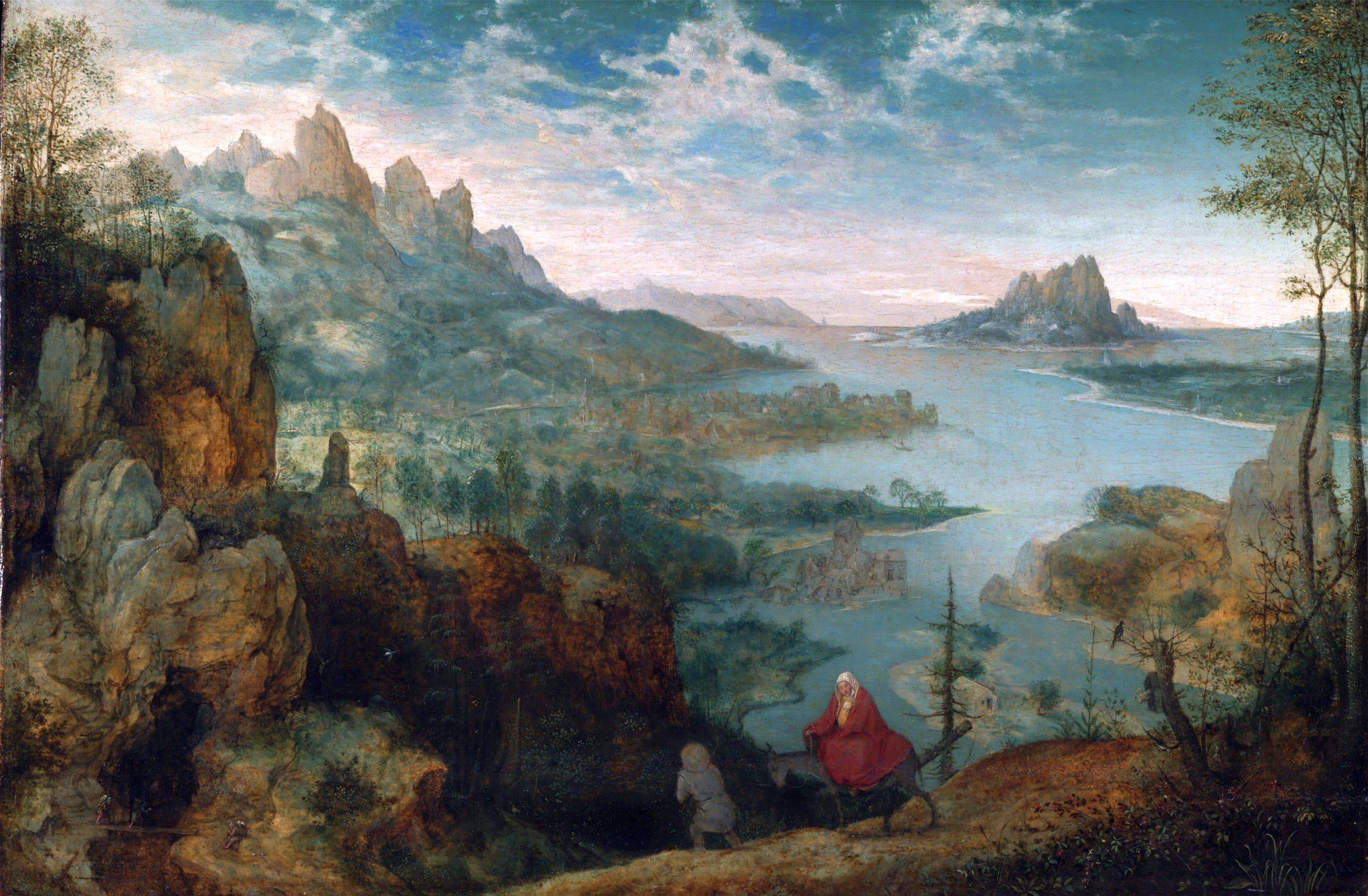
- Artist: Pieter Bruegel the Elder
- Year: 1563
- Medium: oil paint, panel
- Dimensions: 37.1 cm (14.6 in) × 55.6 cm (21.9 in)
- Location: Courtauld Gallery
- Accession: P.1978.PG.47

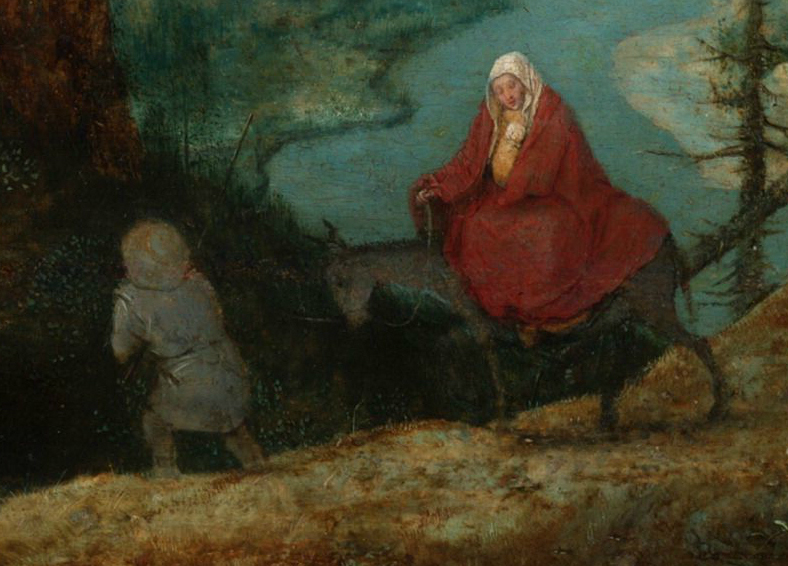
Detail, the Holy Family; the salamanders are just visible below the donkey (click twice to enlarge).

Landscape with the Flight into Egypt is a 1563 oil on wooden panel painting by the Netherlandish Renaissance artist Pieter Bruegel the Elder, showing the biblical Flight into Egypt of Mary and Joseph with the infant Jesus. It measures 37.1 by 55.6 centimetres (14.6 in × 21.9 in) and is held in the Courtauld Gallery, in London.

== History and description ==
The work is a naturalistic world landscape, following the conventions established by Joachim Patinir. The ostensible subject, the Holy Family, are small figures in an imaginary panoramic landscape seen from an elevated viewpoint, with mountains and lowlands, water, and buildings. The subject had long been a popular one in Early Netherlandish art, and increasingly so since Patinir.

Joseph is leading a donkey, bearing Mary who is holding the infant Jesus, tightly wrapped for the journey; his white head can be seen on her chest. They are descending a slope overlooking an Alpine landscape, with a wide river valley bordered by hills and mountains. The painting is dominated by tones of brown and green for the land, and the blue of the water and sky. Mary's unusual red cloak (rather than her traditional blue) and white headgear makes her stand out against the blue of the river, while Joseph's greyish clothes contrast with the green and brown background of wooded hills. In the background, the buildings of towns are faintly visible on each side of the river.

On the tree stump to the right, a pagan statue has fallen out of its shrine as the family passed by, symbolising the triumph of Christ over paganism. This was one of a number of miraculous incidents that medieval legend had added to the very brief biblical story. A branch fallen against a tree creates a cross, presaging the crucifixion. Two tiny salamanders, symbols of evil, can be seen below the figures (very near the bottom edge).

The painting is signed "BRVEGEL MDLXIII". It was owned by Brueghel's patron Cardinal Antoine Perrenot de Granvelle (1517–1586), an important administrator in the Habsburg Netherlands. The painting is mentioned in an inventory of 1607; it is the only painting which can be certainly identified as belonging to him. It was later owned by the artist Peter Paul Rubens, who owned ten or eleven other Bruegels. It was not well known when it was auctioned at Christie's in London in 1939, and bought by Count Antoine Seilern. Together with the other Bruegel in the collection, Christ and the Woman Taken in Adultery, it was donated to the Courtauld Institute of Art in the Princes Gate bequest in 1978.

== See also ==
- List of paintings by Pieter Bruegel the Elder
