= Hugo Bastidas =

American painter

- Born: Hugo Xavier Bastidas; August 18, 1955 (age 71); Quito, Ecuador
- Education: Rutgers University (BA, 1979); Brooklyn Museum School of Art Program (1979-1980); Hunter College, City University of New York (MFA, 1986)
- Known for: Painting
- Spouse: Elizabeth Demaray
- Awards: Robert Smithson Memorial Scholarship (1979-80); Fulbright Fellowship (1990-91); Pollock-Krasner Foundation Grant (1992); Award in Visual Arts, Colombian-Ecuadorian Association (1995)

Hugo Bastidas (born August 18, 1955) is an American painter known for black and white paintings that imitate the effect of grisaille and often resemble black and white photographs. Bastidas’ paintings frequently reference architecture, water, vegetation and art history, and reflect his concern about the human condition, globalization, and their effect on the Earth's well-being.

Bastidas has exhibited throughout the U.S., Europe, South America, the Middle East, and Asia. He is an associate professor of art and former Fulbright fellow.

== Early life and education ==
Hugo Bastidas was born in Quito, Ecuador, in 1955 and moved to the U.S. in 1960. He received a B.A. from Rutgers University in 1979, was awarded a Robert Smithson Scholarship to attend the Brooklyn Museum School of Art Program in sculpture from 1979 to 1980, and completed his MFA from Hunter College, City University of New York in 1986.

== Career ==
=== Work ===
After returning to New York from a Fulbright Fellowship in his native Ecuador in the early 1990s, Bastidas began using a restricted color palette of black and white, alluding to black-and-white photography. His medium- and large-scale paintings featured contrasting zones of high and low detail. By making thousands of marks with a size No. 1 hog's bristle brush on linen primed with rabbit-skin glue, Bastidas achieved a high level of image definition. He also works in digital photography, which informs his subject matter without rendering a photo-realistic effect.

In “Autobiography as Critique,” sculptor and educator Howard McCalebb wrote:

[Bastidas’] painting can be appreciated as a second generation of the rebirth of representational painting in the late 20th Century in the United States...As a second-generation practitioner, Bastidas also joins the mission to rethink representation, and to look more closely at the content of representational modes of expression, to exploit the language of the embedded idea within the pictorial structure itself. His subjects vary from social and or political concerns, to complex pictures that conflict visual perception against cerebral comprehension.

Recurrent subjects in Bastidas' paintings include architecture, water, vegetation, and references to art history. Architecture may serve as scenery for both real and fictional imagery, and is occasionally employed as a social metaphor or to reference natural disasters. His work focuses on such contemporary themes as global warming, technology, and the effects of progress on society and the environment. However, his grisaille paintings also include elements of humor that moderate the serious subject matter and offer hope. Reality and fantasy coexist to form a connection between a real event or disaster and an imagined fiction.

In 1998, art critic Graciela Kartofel wrote about contrasting Latin American and American influences in the Ecuador-born artist's work:

Bastidas paints the maladjustments of contemporary society...by capitalizing on his own experience of the contrasts between Latin America and the United States, comparing the visual melodies of both spheres. The result can be heard in the infinite number of dis-articulated sounds, and in the parodies of an anthropology of the future based on the irony of current social and political relations.

In 1990–1991, Bastidas worked in Ecuador on a Fulbright Fellowship. In 2002, art critic Dominique Nahas wrote that Bastidas’ paintings “put forth a plea for cultural integrity”:

The artist's deftly stippled, textured works resemble travel photographs of exotic locales, snapshots taken in a time before mass tourism and Club Med. The blacks and grays shimmer and flicker as if drenched in sunlight...The scenes appear suspended between the real and dream worlds.

In 2004 and 2006, paintings by Bastidas appeared in Architectural Digest magazine articles that featured homes of noted interior designers.

In his 2011 review of Bastidas’ one-person show titled “Fin de Siècle,” art critic Rafael Diaz Casas commented on the artist's “re-appropriation of works by…master artists in the history of art":

Hugo Bastidas is able to…metaphorically bridge past and present. His reasons and sensibility are conducted by his knowledge and wisdom in art history... Bastidas [exposes] his independent feelings and philosophy of beauty, embodying history and art at the same time.

=== Teaching ===
Bastidas devoted his Fulbright Fellowship (1990–91) to painting and sculpture in Ecuador (teaching and curation). His first teaching assignment was for at La Universidad Central, in advance sculpture. He was later awarded honorary full professor of art by the dean of arts and the art faculty. Since 1998, Bastidas has been a professor of art at New Jersey City University, and since 1999, he has taught and lectured at the Art Students League of New York. He has also taught at Bennington College and the National Academy Museum and School, New York City.

=== Boards and associations ===
From 1996 to 2007, Bastidas served on the board of trustees at the Aljira Center for the Arts in New Jersey. In 2000, he served on the board of trustees of the National Academy in New York, NY. He has been a member of the Century Association in New York City since 2000.

== Awards and recognition ==
In 1979–80, Bastidas was awarded a Robert Smithson Memorial Scholarship in Sculpture by the Brooklyn Museum Art School. In 1990, he was awarded an honorary full professorship at Central University in Quito, Ecuador. The same year, Bastidas was awarded a Fulbright Fellowship. In 1992, he was the recipient of a Pollock-Krasner Foundation grant. In 2009, Bastidas was elected as a National Academician, New York, NY. In 2000, he was elected as a member of the Century Association in New York, NY.

Bastidas has been awarded numerous residences in Europe and the U.S. They include the Time Equities Inc. “Percent for Arts Program” in New York City (2014–16); Le Masion Verte, Marnay-sur-Seine, France (2014); Dada Post, Berlin, Germany (2014); Can Serrat in El Bruc, Spain (2007); Hungarian Multicultural Center in Balatonfurad, Hungary (2006); Centre of Art, Marnay Art Centre (CAMAC) in Marnay-sur-Seine, France (2005); Gallery Boreas Artist Residency in Reykjavik, Iceland (2004); Fundacion Valparaiso in Mojacar, Spain; Sibylla Weisweiter Artist Studio in Berlin, Germany (2003); and Art Omi in New York State (2001).

== Exhibitions ==
Bastidas’ work has been exhibited in solo and group exhibitions in the U.S. and internationally. Prominent one-person exhibitions include "Illuminations I" in 2016 at the Nohra Haime Gallery in New York, NY; "Hugo Bastidas" at the Gyeongnam Art Museum in Changwon, South Korea in 2007; and "Omens in Grisaille" in 2002 at the Nohra Haime Gallery in New York, NY. His work has been represented by the Nohra Haime Gallery in New York City since 1994.

In 2000, Bastidas’ paintings were displayed at the Bienal de Cuenca in Cuenca, Ecuador. In 2001, his paintings were exhibited at the Sharjah Biennial in Sharjah, United Arab Emirates. In 2003, his work was shown in the "Off The Beaten Track: Contemporary Landscapes" exhibit at the Mead Art Museum, Amherst College in Amherst, MA.

From 2017 to 2019, Bastidas has collaborated with CITYarts, Inc., a non-profit organization in NYC, as the lead artist of their Following in the Footsteps of Alexander Hamilton program, a 3-piece mural (each spanning 80ft H X 25ft W) currently in progress at the Alexander Hamilton Playground in West Harlem.

== Personal ==
Bastidas is married to sculptor and interdisciplinary artist Elizabeth Demaray.
