= CityArts =

CityArts may refer to:

- CITYarts, Inc. (1989–present) nonprofit public arts and education organization
- Cityarts Workshop (1971–1988), nonprofit community mural arts organization
- Manhattan Media American media company
