= Demaray =

Demaray is a surname. Notable people with the surname include:

- Arthur E. Demaray (1887–1958), American government administrator
- Elizabeth Demaray (fl. 1991), American artist
- John G. Demaray (1930–2015), American medievalist
