= CITYarts, Inc. =

American nonprofit organization

- Formerly: Cityarts Workshop
- Type: Non-Profit
- Founded: 1989
- Headquarters: New York, New York, US
- Key people: Tsipi Ben-Haim, Executive and Creative Director
- Website: www.cityarts.org

CITYarts, Inc. is a nonprofit public arts and education organization, focusing on creating murals and mosaics with youth and professional artists.

== About ==
For over 30 years, Tsipi Ben-Haim has been the Executive and Creative Director of CITYarts, Inc. As stated on their website, the mission of CITYarts is to "engage youth with professional artists in the creation of public art, including murals and mosaic. Through this creative process, CITYarts empowers, educates, and connects youth and children locally and around the world to become active participants in realizing their potential and transforming communities."

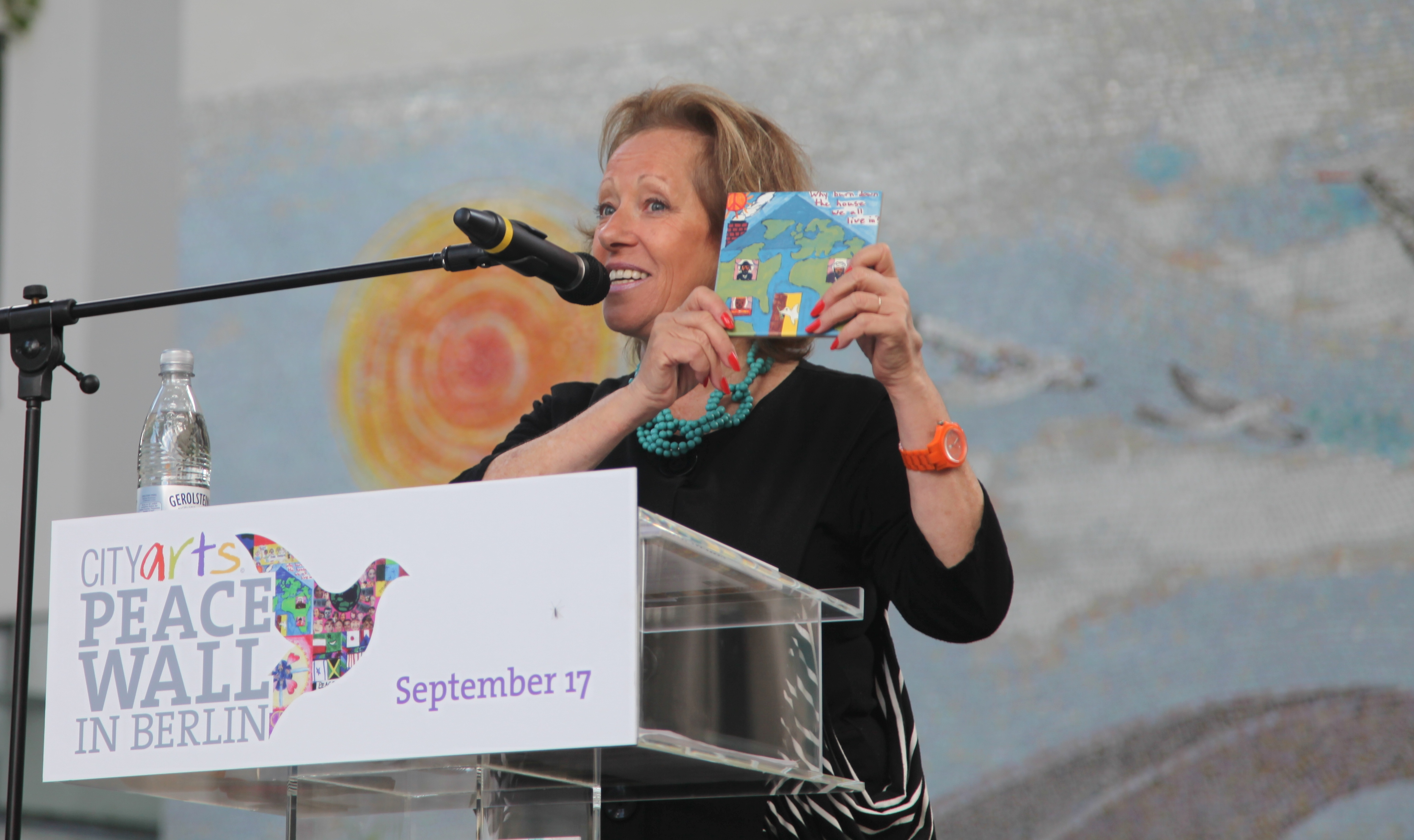
Tsipi Ben-Haim 2013 at the opening ceremony of CITYarts' Peace Wall in Berlin, Germany.

== History ==
CITYarts, Inc. was founded in 1989 by Tsipi Ben-Haim. The organization takes part of its name from Cityarts Workshop, which closed down after losing its funding in 1988. Since its inception, CITYarts has created over 350 mural projects predominantly in New York City, and seven Peace Walls internationally.

== Projects ==
CITYarts' projects are created under five programs: Young Minds Build Bridges, Community Identity , Global HeARTWarming, Kids for Justice, and Windows of Opportunity. These projects are produced and created in under-served communities in the five boroughs of New York City, with the exception of Young Minds Build Bridges, which extends internationally. CITYarts includes a broad constituency of participants in order to expose youth to a wide range of perspectives, experiences, and backgrounds. CITYarts executes its programs through the youth-adult partnership model, in which young people are treated as responsible individuals with the capacity to meet challenges and make decisions. Through this creative process, CITYarts empowers, educates, and connects youth and children locally and around the world to become active participants in realizing their potential and transforming communities.

=== 2022 Projects ===
- Fly Us To The Moon
- We Can Stop the Speed of Climate Change
- The Next Wave
- Windows of Opportunity
- What We Bring To The Table
- A Bridge to Peace
- Our Voices
- Restoration: Mosaic Rolling Bench at General Grant National Memorial
- Walking with Justice

=== 2021 Projects ===
- The Golden Door
- The Joker Stairs
- The Next Wave
- Restoration: Mosaic Rolling Bench at General Grant National Memorial
- Always in Bloom

=== The Rolling Bench (1972–1974) ===
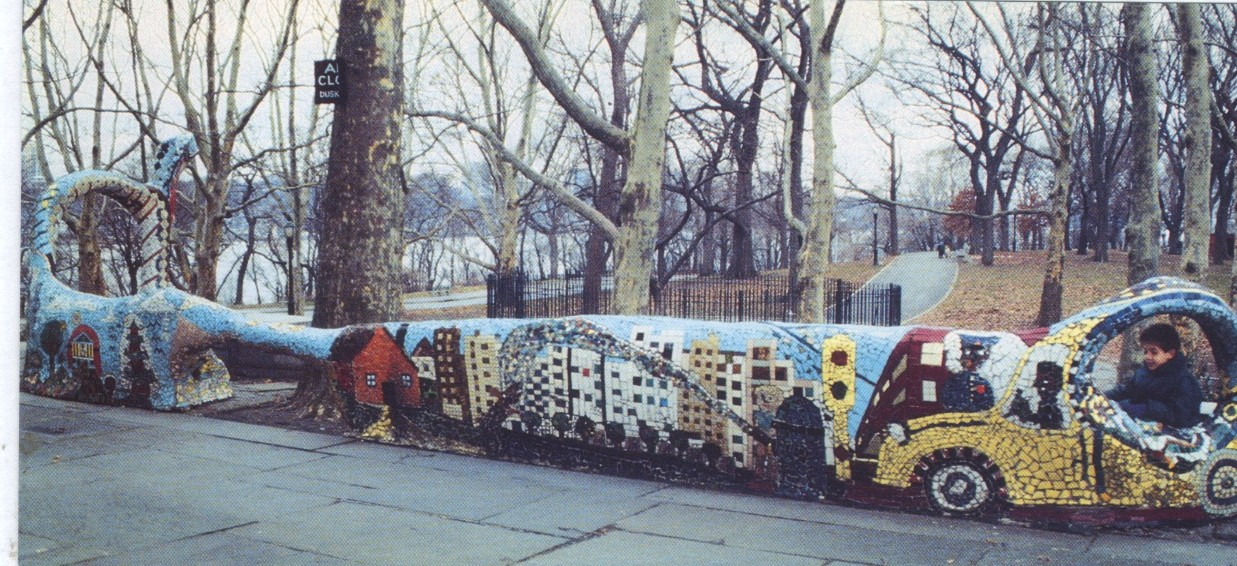
The Rolling Bench at Grant's Tomb, CITYarts, Inc., 1991

One of CITYarts' projects is The Rolling Bench at Grant's Tomb. A 400-foot mosaic bench, The Rolling Bench was described as the largest public arts project in the country when it was built between 1972 and 1974 by City Arts Workshop, the organization that would later become CITYarts, Inc. The Rolling Bench was designed by a group of artists and youth, and the work on the bench was led by Chilean-born New York artist Pedro Silva and the architect Phillip Danzig.

The benches were not universally popular and there was much debate over whether or not to destroy or move the benches, citing architectural conflict between the neoclassical tomb and the modern, colorful bench. In 1997, the benches were nearly removed by the Park Service as part of the 100th anniversary renovations of Grant's Tomb. The Park Service cut out a small section of the benches and lifted it a few inches to assess how difficult it would be to move them. However, The Rolling Bench was not removed and was restored in 2008 with the help of one of the original artists and many of the original volunteers, together with a group of young artists. It is also a current restoration project undertaken by CITYarts as of summer 2021.

=== Forever Tall (2001) ===
Forever Tall was a mural completed in 2001, as a response to 9/11, overlooking Cooper Square in the East Village of Manhattan. The mural depicted the skyline of Manhattan at night with the twin towers as two columns of flowers. The lead artists on this project were Hope Gangloff and Jason Search. The mural no longer exists as the wall was subsequently painted over to be used for advertising.

== Programs ==
=== Young Minds Build Bridges ===
The Young Minds Build Bridges program strengthens bonds among youth worldwide and helps to foster positive relationships among young people from diverse backgrounds. This program connects youth in NYC and their peers around the globe through Pieces for Peace art education workshops, the Pieces for Peace International Traveling Exhibition, and Peace Wall murals and mosaics.

==== Peace Walls ====
===== Harlem, New York Peace Wall, 2005 =====
The Pieces for Peace Mosaic Wall is a vibrant 213-foot long (65m), permanent mosaic wall installed at the Jacob H. Schiff Park in Harlem, at 138th St and Amsterdam Ave in New York. This mosaic is one of CITYarts’ most recognizable projects due to its scale and international scope. The mosaic project was an integral part of CITYarts’ first international youth-led initiative, Pieces for Peace. Launched in 2004, the mosaic design was created by artist/illustrator Peter Sís in collaboration with international youth, and was completed in 2005. The project was initially restored by artist Ricardo Arango, and is currently undergoing restoration with artist Andres Hoyos.

===== Karachi, Pakistan Peace wall, 2007 =====
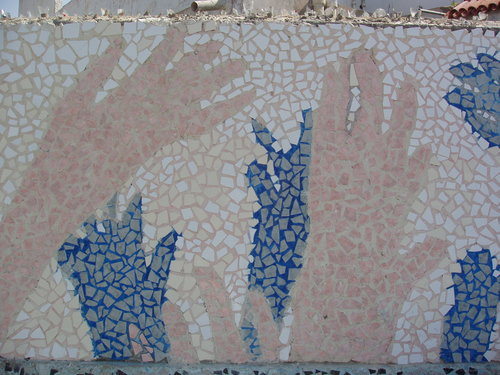
Peace Wall in Pakistan. CITYarts, Inc., 2007

The design of the peace wall in Pakistan represents the need to protect forests and glaciers despite what culture or faith originate from. The wall was built in Karachi and is described as "A once in a lifetime experience" by one of the youths who helped create it.

===== Tel Aviv–Jaffa, Israel peace wall, 2010 =====
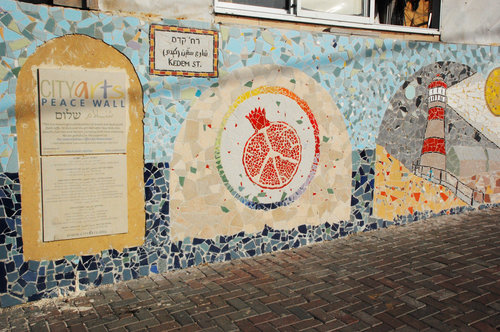
Peace Wall in Israel. CITYarts, Inc., 2010

This Peace Wall mosaic was created in Ajami/Gabalia with the full collaboration of the neighborhood youth and the workshop participants. Under the direction of two artists, Yoav Weiss (Jewish) and Salma Shehade (Arab), 50 after-school workshops took place in Tel Aviv-Yafo, at the Arab-Hebrew Theatre of Yafo, the Peres Center for Peace, and other locations.

During this time, CITYarts also worked with the participants to create a neighborhood garden with The Council for a Beautiful Israel. They created a Leadership Club, led by the Tabeetha School, to be in charge of the maintenance and care of the wall.

===== London, UK Peace Wall, 2012 =====
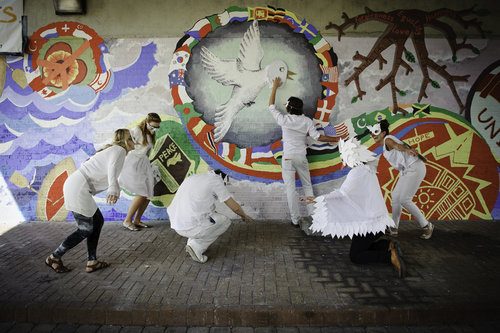
Peace Wall in London. CITYarts, Inc., 2012

This Peace Wall mural was created with the help of professional artists Sadie Edginton and Joanna Nowek. Local youth and the public had the opportunity to participate in Pieces for Peace art workshops and helped create the Peace Wall mural on one of London Overground's walls.

The Peace Wall is located at Regents Canal Bridge on Dunston Road (under Haggerston Overground Bridge).

===== Berlin, Germany Peace Wall, 2013 =====
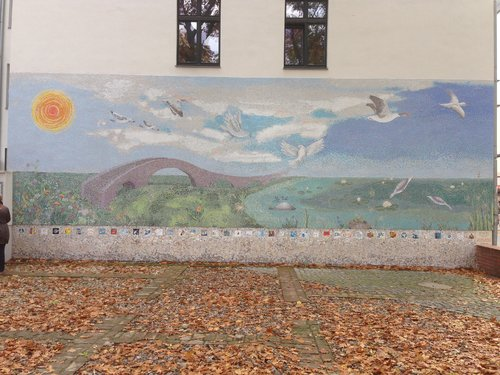
Peace Wall in Berlin. CITYarts, Inc., 2013

This Peace Wall mosaic was produced in the historic Mitte district of Berlin, on a street "known to many as the 'Street of Tolerance' because of its proximity to the Old Jewish Cemetery, a landmark Protestant church, a historic Catholic hospital, and the Jewish School."

In a collaboration between multicultural youth together with students from diverse EU countries and communities, the Peace Wall "connects – not divides – and celebrates the peaceful future that can be realized through the engagement of tomorrow's leaders." The mosaic, located in such an emotionally-charged and historically significant city, serves to reflect on Berlin's "complex and often tragic past while looking forward into a future of peace envisioned by today's generation of European youth."

==== Pieces for Peace (2002 – present) ====
Pieces for Peace is a CITYarts project started in 2002. As stated on the CITYarts website, this project "was designed to build bridges of international understanding by bringing together American youth and their peers from around the world to create drawings, paintings, and poems." Pieces for Peace enables national and international students, ages 12 to 18, to express their own personalized visuals of peace and what peace means or looks like to them, by drawing images on 6 in × 6 in (150 mm × 150 mm) pieces of paper. These drawings are then digitized and uploaded onto CITYarts' online gallery, and are sometimes incorporated into Pieces for Peace Traveling Exhibitions around the world. These works have been exhibited at the UN in New York City. Representative images and poems from this massively collaborative art project were incorporated into the design of the Jacob H. Schiff Park mosaic wall, under the artistic direction of the award-winning children's illustrator Peter Sís, to help share their visions for a more peaceful future and to translate those ideas into personal works of art. To date, there have been over 10,000 Pieces for Peace created, from 88 countries around the world.

===== Pieces for Peace Workshops & Traveling Exhibitions (2005 – present) =====
CITYarts' Pieces for Peace Workshops program welcomes and enables interested individuals, teachers, students, youth group leaders and more to organize a classroom, group, or personalized workshop to create their own Pieces for Peace.

The Pieces for Peace Traveling Exhibition features selected Pieces for Peace created by youths from around the world. This exhibition travels both nationally and internationally.

Some exhibition venues include, but are not limited to:

1. Flushing Town Hall, Queens, NY: September–October 2005.
2. Cork Gallery, Avery Fisher Hall, Lincoln Center, New York, NY: May–June 2006.
3. Jewish Community Center, New York, NY: July–September 2006.
4. Paper Mill Playhouse, Millburn, NJ: September–October 2006.
5. Gabarron Foundation Carriage House Center for the Arts, New York, NY: March–April 2007.
6. Haus der Kunst, Munich, Germany: July 2007.
7. iEARN Youth Summit, Cairo, Egypt: July 2007.
8. Beit-Sokolov Center for Journalists, Tel-Aviv, Israel: September–October 2007.
9. Museo Fundación Cristóbal Gabarrón, Valladolid, Spain: October 2007.
10. Fundación Casa Pintada, Murcia, Spain.
11. EU Parliament, Belgium: October 2009.
12. United Nations Headquarter, New York, NY: December 2009.
13. American International Toy Fair, Javits Center, New York, NY: February 2010.
14. Mission of the State of Quatar, New York, NY: March 2010.
15. Ana Tzarev Gallery, New York, NY: April–May 2010.
16. Fundacion Marcelo Botin, Santander, Spain: October 2010.
17. Association Memoire de l’Avenir, Paris, France: May 2011.
18. Allianz Headquarters, Berlin, Germany: December 2011.
19. European Capital of Culture (ECOC) Maribor 2012 Maribor, Slovenia: May 2012.
20. The Saatchi Gallery, London, United Kingdom: July–August 2012.
21. Centro Sefarad Israel, Madrid, Spain. January 2014 – 2017.
22. Senator Gillibrand's Office, New York, NY: November 2016 – present.
23. The Eastern Connecticut State University Willimantic, CT: February 2017.
24. The German Consulate, New York, NY: September 2017 – October 2017.
25. The Jewish Community Center, Madrid, Spain, September 2017.
26. The Palais des Nations, United Nations Headquarters, Geneva, Switzerland December 2017.
27. Memoire de L'Avenir, Paris, France, April 2018.
28. Crete Cultural Center, Crete, Greece, 2019.
29. Culture Center, Athens, Greece, 2019.
30. Toro Cultural Center, Toro, Spain, 2021.
31. House of Culture, Zamora, Spain, 2022.
32. Wetteren Town Hall, Wettern, Belgium, 2022.
33. Europa Experience Center, Vienna, Austria, 2024.

=== Community Identity ===
The Community Identity program encourages participating youth and adults to examine who they are and what their neighborhood should look like. During the creative process, they beautify and revitalize their neighborhoods while addressing social and civic issues. Youth, families, and community members collaborate on the creation of permanent murals and mosaics in their neighborhoods led by professional artists.

==== Following in the Footsteps of Alexander Hamilton Years 1, 2, and 3 (2017 – 2019) ====
To celebrate the local cultures of West Harlem, NYC, with a focus on the legacy of Alexander Hamilton, CITYarts began producing and creating mural project #338 in the historic Alexander Hamilton Playground community park in 2017. This project was created in collaboration with the local schools, youth, community, a professional artist (Hugo Bastidas), artist assistants, volunteers and residents. The 3-year project endeavored to "celebrate the unique community identity of Harlem where Hamilton lived, and inspire youths to follow in his footsteps." The project was completed in the summer of 2019.

==== Alice on the Wall (in progress) ====
CITYarts’ mural project #328, Alice on the Wall, is located at Washington Market Park on Chambers Street, between West St and Greenwich St. The mural "was originally created after 9/11 as a way to encourage students at Stuyvesant High School to return to school," as is now in the process of being restored.

==== Celebrating the Heroes of Our City – Restoration (in progress) ====
CITYarts’ mural project #327 is the restoration of Celebrating the Heroes of our City, led by artist Janusz Gilewicz. Located at the Henry M. Jackson Playground adjacent to P.S. 134 in Manhattan, NY., the restoration of the mural "will bring the mural back to its formal glory to pair with the new playground."

==== Past Forward (2019) ====
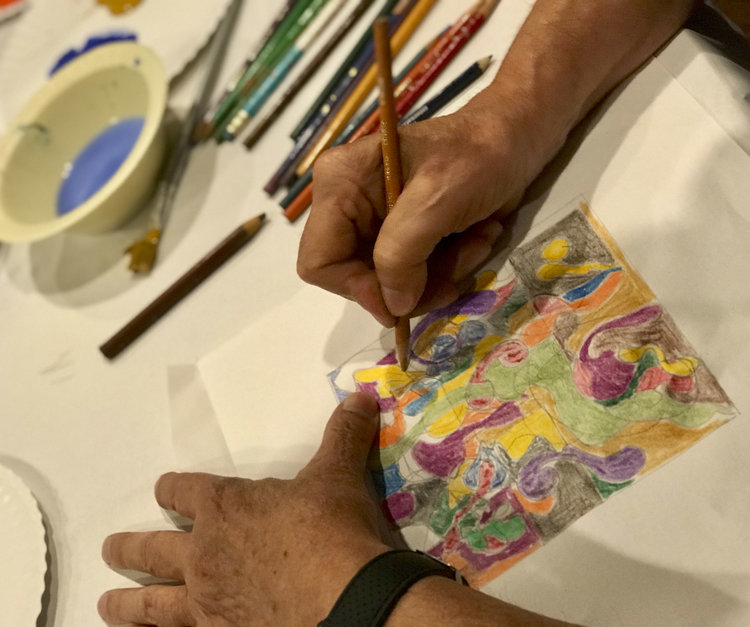
Art done by senior citizens at JASA Club 76, CITYarts, Inc., 2019

CITYarts’ Past Forward program was designed "to foster an intergenerational, mutually beneficial relationship between the senior citizens of JASA Club 76, a senior center on W. 76th street, and local youth." The project is currently in its first phase of production, under lead artist Kristin Holmes-Linder.

==== Windows to the Future (in progress) ====
A CITYarts mural is being planned in collaboration with the students of the Murray Hill Academy, in Manhattan, New York.

==== Visions to the World (in progress) ====
A CITYarts mural is being planned in collaboration with the students of Hamilton Grange Middle School, in Manhattan, New York.

==== Beacon of Light (in progress) ====
CITYarts has plans to collaborate on a mural in one of #333 DYCD's Beacon Centers. Beacon Centers are areas "typically within school that act as an after school community center so youth have somewhere to go if they are not able to go straight home."

=== Global HeARTWarming ===
The Global HeART Warming program celebrates nature and raises awareness about the speed of climate change by inspiring youth to voice their ideas about climate change. Workshops and mural projects inspire youth to encourage change in their families and community, impacting a difference on a global level.

==== Always in Bloom (in progress) ====
CITYarts produced and created two projects in The Urban Assembly School for Green Careers' public community garden in collaboration with professional artists and the local community, to "celebrate nature, sustainability, and raise awareness to the speed of climate change."

In the first year, CITYarts plans to produce a redesign of the garden elements, create a mosaic for peace around the fish pond, and in the second year a completed mural on the wall facing the garden.

==== Kids for Justice ====
The Kids for Justice program encourages students "to develop and express their thoughts on justice through art. At-risk youth meet with judicial representatives to discuss justice and social responsibility. Based on the ideas they draw and in design workshops led by professional artists, they create a permanent mural for their school."

==== Walking With Justice ====
CITYarts will collaborate with the High School for Law, Advocacy and Community Justice at the Martin Luther King Jr. High School in Manhattan, NY. Their project will paint the front doors of the school, "to ensure that the students get a proper welcome each morning."

=== Windows of Opportunity ===
CITYarts' Windows of Opportunity program "identifies artistically talented youth" to participate in creative projects. According to their website, this program aims at "further cultivating their talents through studies at arts institutions, learning centers, and other special projects. CITYarts also works to connect such talented young men and women with professional artists who offer their support in guidance towards higher education, hands-on experience in studio work, and career advice." The Windows of Opportunity program notably employs artist Bernard Wiggins, who originally became involved with CITYarts as a youth participant on a mural project when he was twelve years old in 1995.

== Controversy ==
CITYarts' proposed murals in two Chelsea parks were met with anger from the Chelsea community, which DNAinfo reports was widely excluded from the process. In an article titled, "Locals Irked By 'La-Di-Da' Plans for Kids to Create Murals in Chelsea Parks," DNAinfo reports that CITYarts began moving forward with the project without consulting neighbors and local block associations. Bob Trentlyon, a public member of the Waterfront, Parks and Environment committee expressed dismay that CITYarts was "leaving out the community." Additionally, community members felt insulted by Ben-Haim's claim, on a flier she distributed, that Clement Clarke Moore Park "feels abandoned."

== People ==
CITYarts has worked with the following artists:

- Peter Sís
- Pedro Silva
- Hope Gangloff
- Jason Search
- Bill Moakler
- Joseph La Piana
- Duda Penteado
- Ricardo Arango
- Kevin Galeazzi
- Hugo Bastidas
- Andres Hoyos
- Michaela Shuster

== See also ==
- Grant's tomb
- Peter Sís
- Public art
- Non-profit organization
