= The Death of the Virgin (Bruegel) =

Painting by Pieter Bruegel the Elder

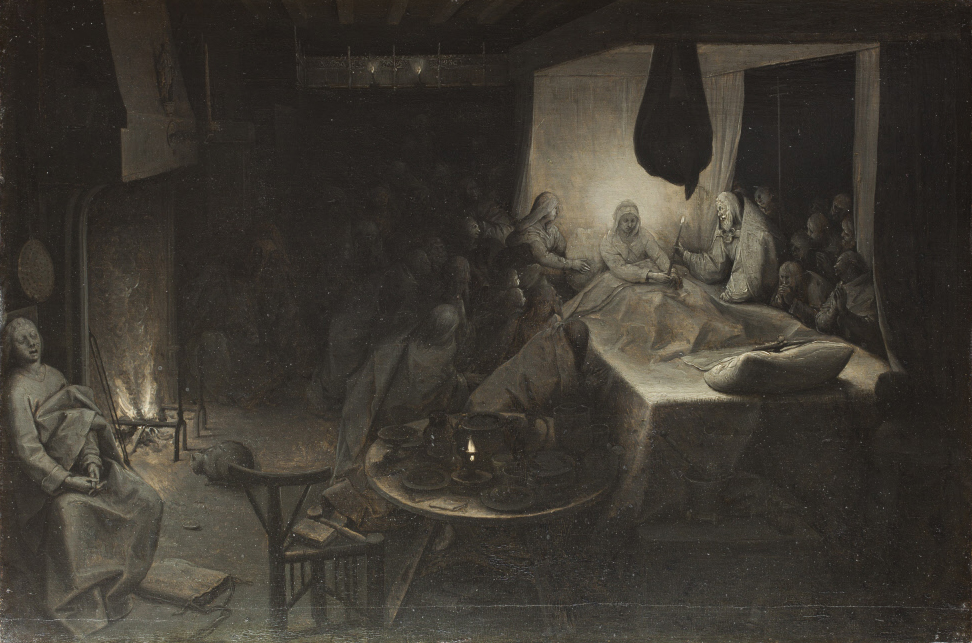
- Artist: Pieter Bruegel the Elder
- Year: 1564
- Medium: Oil on oak panel
- Dimensions: 677 x 853 x 126 mm
- Location: Upton House, Warwickshire

The Death of the Virgin, also known as The Dormition of the Virgin, is a 1564 grisaille painting by the Netherlandish Renaissance artist Pieter Bruegel the Elder, depicting the death of the Virgin Mary with the Apostles and other figures in attendance. It is now displayed in Upton House and under the care of the National Trust. It is one of the three surviving grisailles by Bruegel.

== Background ==
The Virgin Mary's death is recorded as an apocryphal story in the Golden Legend by Jacobus de Voragine. It inspired Bruegel's The Death of the Virgin and works by other artists. Depictions of the scene typically limit those in attendance to the apostles, making Bruegel's painting unique. Bruegel's painting shows similarities to Martin Schongauer's and Albrecht Dürer's engravings of the same scene which may suggest inspiration.

Charles de Tolnay stated that the composition was inspired by the miniature La Mort, painted by Simon Bening in the Grimani Breviary between 1505 and 1510. Walter S. Gibson also noted the similarities.

Infrared reflectography has shown a minimal amount of underdrawing carried out with brushes. The underdrawn lines show that the cat was originally slightly more to the right, the woman plumping the pillow was also more to the right and the bed may have been smaller.

== History ==
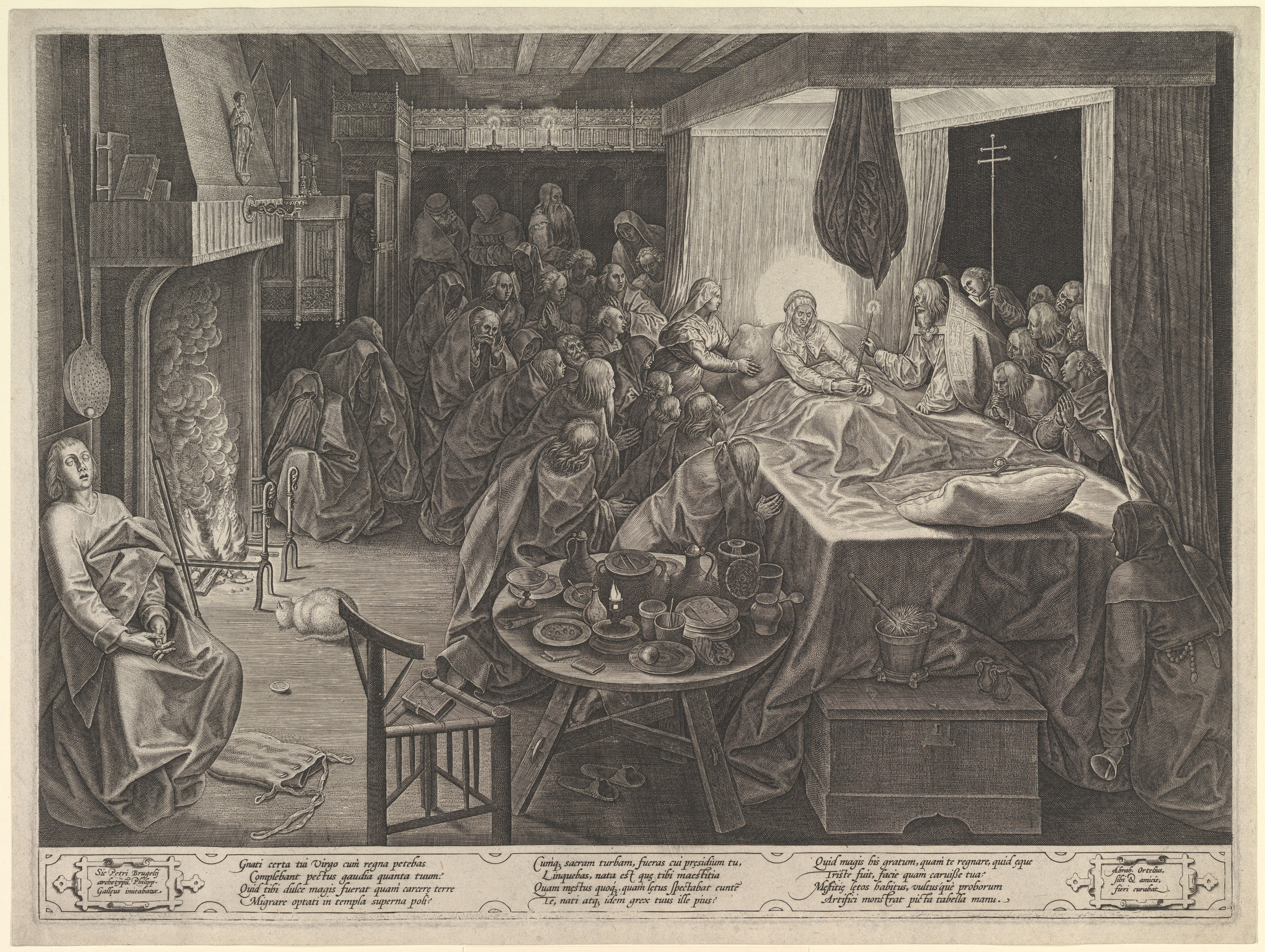
Engraving of The Death of the Virgin, produced by Philips Galle

The Death of the Virgin was originally owned by Abraham Ortelius and may have been commissioned by him. In 1574, Ortelius asked Philips Galle to reproduce the painting as engravings for which he wrote an inscription. He then distributed these prints to his friends including notable figures Dirck Volkertszoon Coornhert and Benedictus Montanus. Coornhert wrote a poem dedicated to Bruegel and Galle which noted the gift. In 1590, Benito Arias Montano requested an impression of the engraving. In a letter to Ortelius, he described the grisaille, which he had seen previously, as 'painted in the most skillful manner and with the greatest piety'. Pieter Bruegel the Younger made multiple copies of The Death of the Virgin, one of which was in colour.

=== Provenance ===
After Ortelius' death, The Death of the Virgin was acquired first by Isabella Brant and then by her husband Peter Paul Rubens. After his death in 1640, the painting was described in the inventory of his possessions as 'blanc et noir du Vieux Breugel'. In English, this translates to 'white and black by Breugel the Elder'.In 1691, the painting is mentioned in the inventory of Jean-Baptiste Anthoine. Lord Lee of Fareham acquired the painting for his collection at Richmond in 1930 from an art dealer in London.

=== Exhibition history ===
In 2013, The Death of the Virgin was displayed in the exhibition New Light on Old Masters at the Squash Court Gallery. The painting was also displayed in the exhibition Bruegel in Black & White: Three Grisailles Reunited alongside Christ and the Woman Taken in Adultery and Three Soldiers, the two other surviving grisailles by Bruegel, in 2016.

== See also ==
- List of paintings by Pieter Bruegel the Elder
