= Robert J. Fox (pastor) =

American pastor (1930—1984)

Robert J. Fox (1930 – April 27, 1984) was an associate pastor of St. Paul's Church in East Harlem and former coordinator of the Spanish Community Action program in the Roman Catholic Archdiocese of New York.

== Community Work and Activism ==
Robert J. Fox was responsible for conceiving Summer in the City (city program), a New York City antipoverty program with efforts concentrated in the South Bronx, East Harlem, and Lower East Side. The project was funded by the federal Office of Economic Opportunity and in 1967 ran a total of 26 storefront centers and employed 580 workers.

== Influence ==
The "spirit" of Summer in the City (city program) was influential to Susan Shapiro Kiok, one of the artists in the city program. Susan went on to incorporate Cityarts Workshop in 1971.
