= Christ and the Woman Taken in Adultery (Bruegel) =

Painting by Pieter Bruegel the Elder

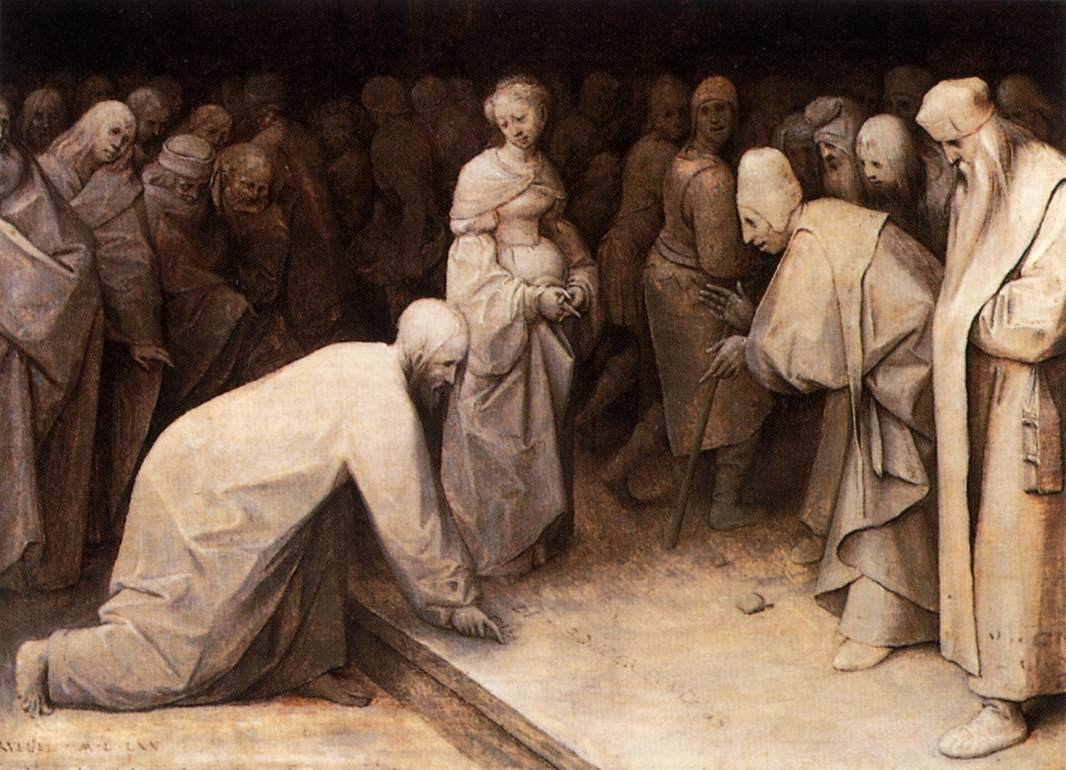
- Artist: Pieter Bruegel the Elder
- Year: 1565
- Medium: Oil on panel
- Dimensions: 24.1 cm × 34.4 cm (9.5 in × 13.5 in)
- Location: Courtauld Gallery, London

Christ and the Woman Taken in Adultery is a small panel painting in grisaille (near monochrome) by the Netherlandish Renaissance printmaker and painter Pieter Bruegel the Elder. It is signed and dated 1565.

Jesus and the woman taken in adultery is a biblical episode from John 8:1–8:20 where Jesus encounters an adulteress brought before Pharisees and scribes, which has been depicted by many artists. Such a crime was punishable by death by stoning; however, in the scene, Jesus stoops to write (in Dutch) he that is without sin among you, let him first cast the stone at her on the ground before her feet. A number of the unthrown stones lie on the floor to the woman's left.

== Description ==
Bruegel depicts the woman as one of the few graceful figures in the scene. She is rendered as an idealised form, atypical of Brugel's usual earthy and homely female figures; though the basic layout of the composition is Netherlandish, "the austere composition and monumental figures are perhaps the most Italianate in all Bruegel's paintings". Apart from an even smaller Three Soldiers in the Frick Collection, Bruegel's only other surviving grisaille painting is The Death of the Virgin at Upton House, Warwickshire, which is also an unusually conventional treatment of a religious subject by Bruegel's standards. However, the earliest documented work by Bruegel was grisaille wings for an altarpiece in 1550/51, as he finished his apprenticeship. This was in Mechelen, where he is documented between September 1550 and October 1551 assisting Peeter Baltens on an altarpiece (now lost), painting the wings.

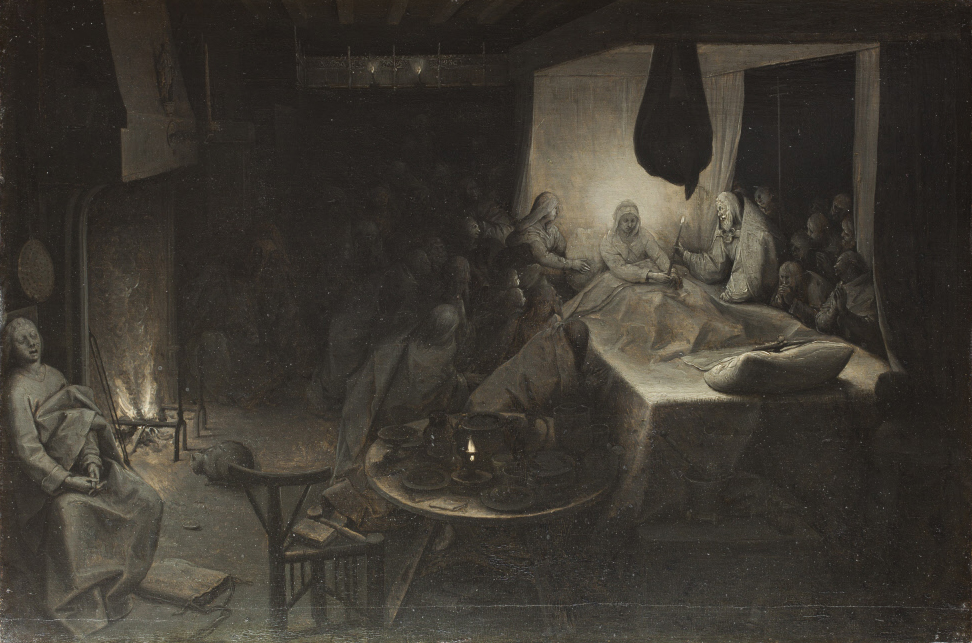
Death of the Virgin at Upton House, Warwickshire, 1564

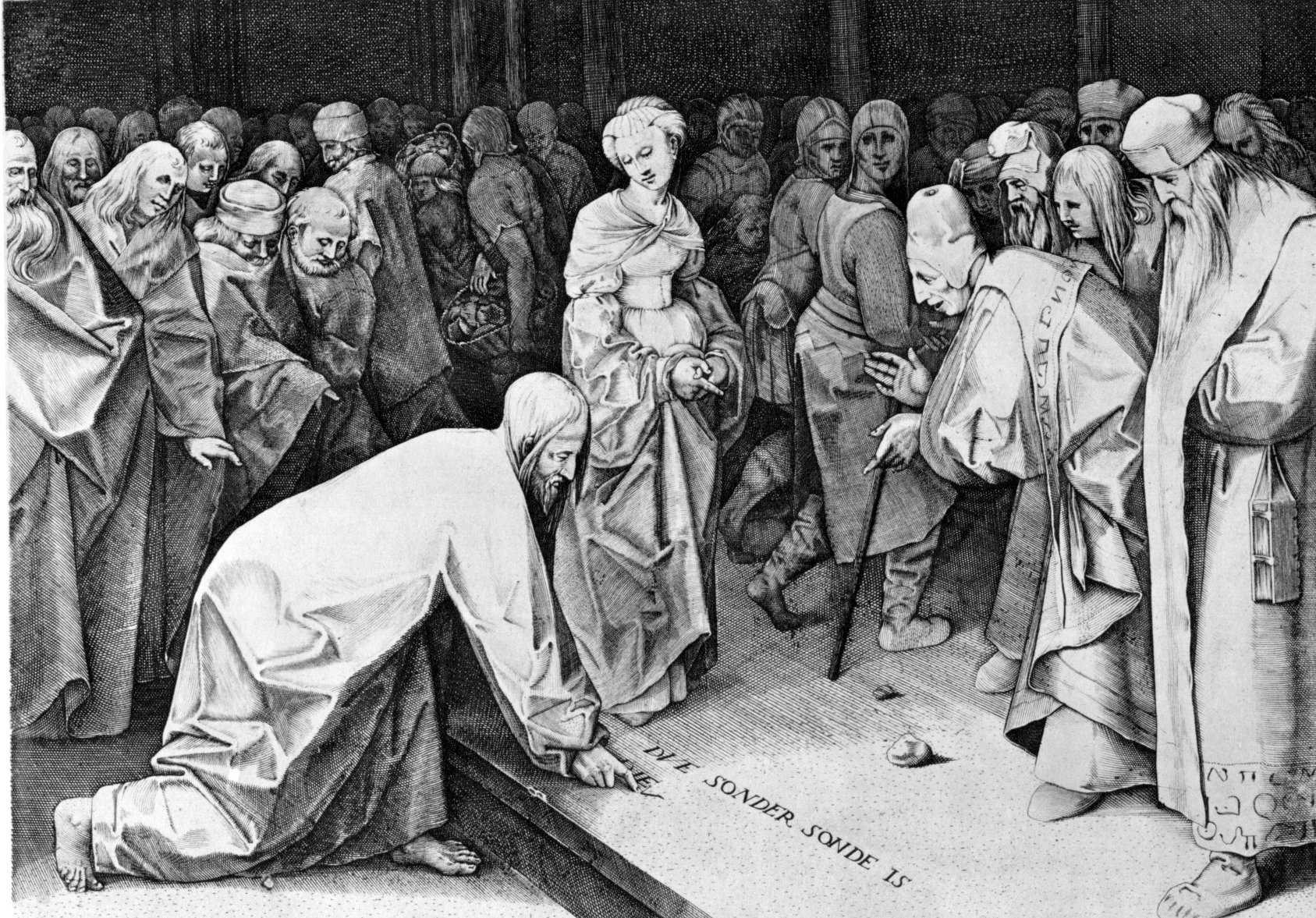
The 1579 engraving by Paul Perret

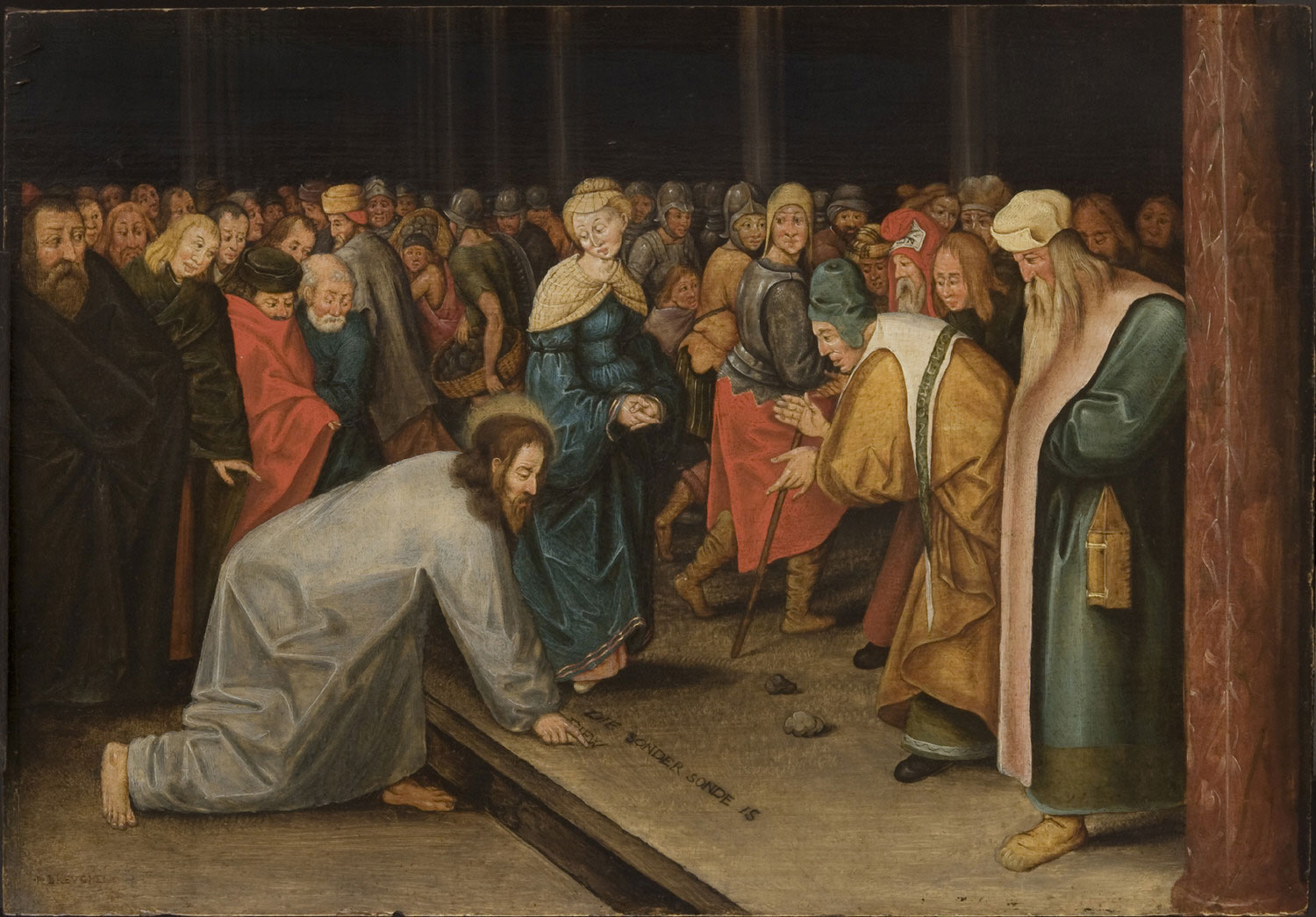
Pieter Brueghel the Younger's oil on panel version of c. 1600

== Provenance ==
The painting was not sold by the artist and seems to be the only one inherited by his son Jan Brueghel the Younger. An engraving was published in 1579 by Paul Perret, who apparently lent the painting for the purpose since there are regular pricks along the edges to make a grid. There are a number of other copies, some attributed to the artist's sons, perhaps made after the engraving, and the painting was lent to Cardinal Federico Borromeo for copying (perhaps the version now in Bergamo). A version attributed to Breuegel's son Pieter Brueghel the Younger of c. 1600 is in the Philadelphia Museum of Art.

It was sold by the family in the 17th century, apparently by Jan Brueghel the Younger, and was in England by the 18th century, being sold at Christie's in 1834 and again in 1952 when it was bought by Count Antoine Seilern, whose collection was bequeathed to the Courtauld in 1978. The work was stolen from the Courtauld Gallery on 2 February 1982. Because of its value and fame, it proved unsaleable on the open market and did not resurface again until 1992, when it was recovered by British police. During that interim, it likely acted as collateral for the criminals.

== Sources ==
- Braham Helen, The Princes Gate Collection, Courtauld Institute Galleries, London 1981, ISBN 0-904563-04-9
- Hagen, Rose-Marie & Hagen, Rainer. Bruegel. Peasants, Fools and Demons. Taschen, 2000. ISBN 3-8228-5991-5
- Sutton, Peter. Dutch and Flemish Paintings: The Collection of Willem, Baron Van Dedem. Frances Lincoln, 2002. ISBN 0-7112-2010-7
