= Jardin botanique de Marnay-sur-Seine =

Botanical garden in Aube, Champagne-Ardenne, France

Coordinates: 48°30′N 03°33′E

The Jardin botanique de Marnay-sur-Seine (2 hectares) is a botanical garden located on the Chemin des Gougins, Marnay-sur-Seine, Aube, Champagne-Ardenne, France. It is open daily in the warmer months; an admission fee is charged.

The garden was founded in 1995, construction started in 1998, in 2000 the garden opened to the public, and in 2002 it was designated a Jardin Botanique de France. Its conservatory of local flora opened in 2003, and in 2007 it published an Index Seminum.

Today the garden contains about 2500 plants organized in a rose garden, vegetable garden, herb and medicinal plant collections, a trail illustrating evolution, shade and ornamental gardens, and collections of local and Russian plants.

== See also ==
- List of botanical gardens in France
