= Tabeetha School =

International Private School

Coordinates: 32°3′9.1″N 34°45′13.3″E

The Tabeetha School is a school on Yefet Street #21 in Jaffa, a district of Tel Aviv, Israel, run by the Church of Scotland which "welcomes all children regardless of race, nationality, gender or religion". It was founded in 1863.
