= Grisaille =

Painting technique

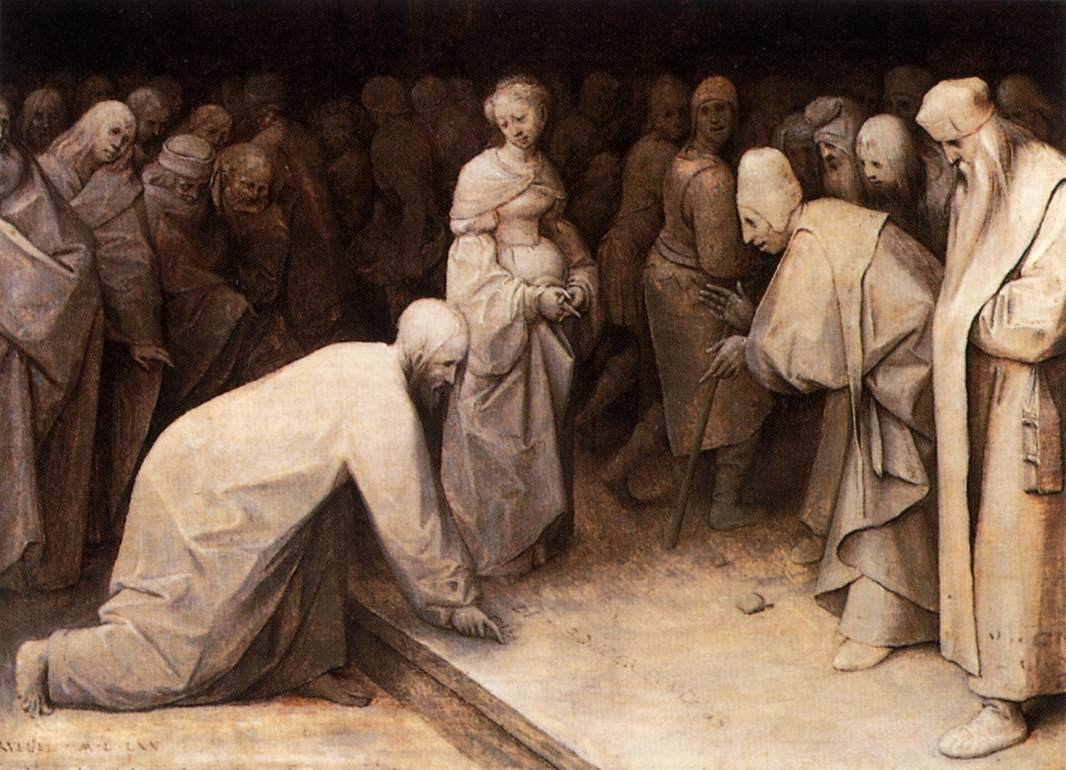
Christ and the Woman Taken in Adultery, Pieter Bruegel the Elder, 1565, 24 cm × 34 cm (9.4 in × 13.4 in)

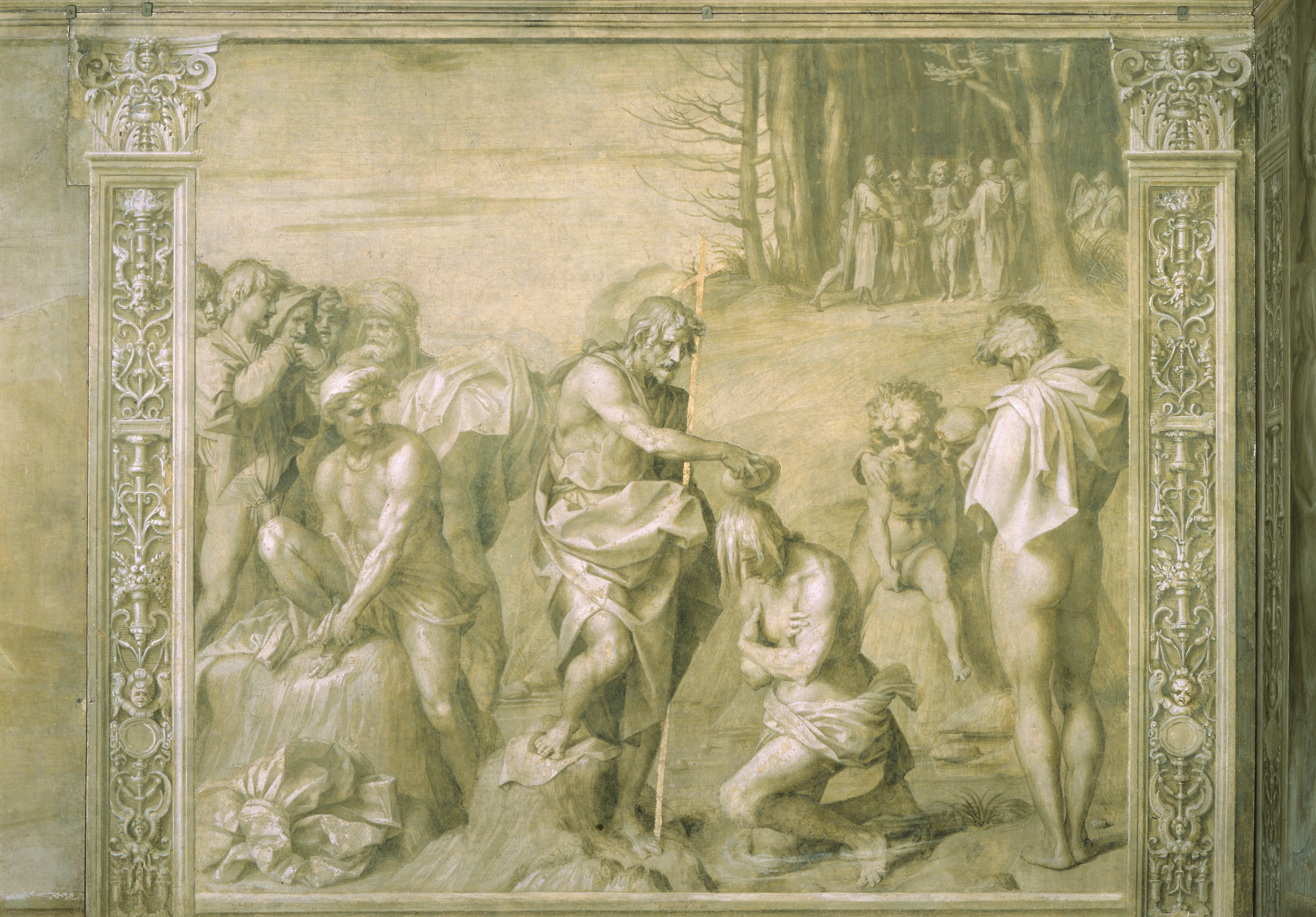
Battesimo della gente, one of Andrea del Sarto's gray and brown grisaille frescoes in the Chiostro dello Scalzo, Florence (1511-26)

Grisaille (/ɡrɪˈzaɪ/ or /ɡrɪˈzeɪl/; French: grisaille, lit. 'greyed' French pronunciation: [ɡʁizaj], from gris 'grey') is a painting executed entirely in shades of black and grey or of another neutral greyish colour. It is particularly used in large decorative schemes in imitation of sculpture. Many grisailles include a slightly wider colour range.

A grisaille may be executed for its own sake, as underpainting for an oil painting (in preparation for glazing layers of colour over it), or as a model for an engraver or other printmaker to work from. "Rubens and his school sometimes use monochrome techniques in sketching compositions for engravers." By the 19th century many illustrations for books or magazines were made reproducing grisailles in watercolour. Full colouring of a subject makes many more demands of an artist, and working in grisaille was often chosen as being quicker and cheaper, although the effect was sometimes deliberately chosen for aesthetic reasons. Grisaille paintings resemble the drawings, normally in monochrome, that artists from the Renaissance onward were trained to produce; like drawings they can also betray the hand of a less talented assistant more easily than a fully coloured painting.

== History ==
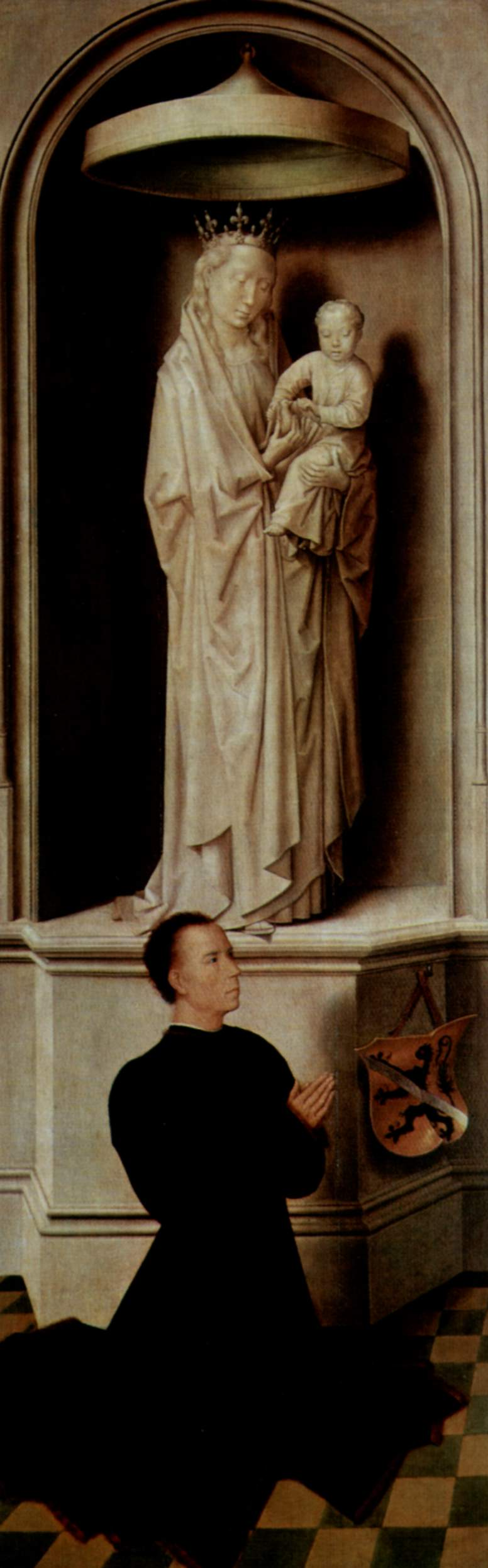
Hans Memling wing, with donor portrait in colour below grisaille Madonna imitating sculpture

Giotto used grisaille in the lower registers of his frescoes in the Scrovegni Chapel in Padua (c. 1304) and Robert Campin, Jan van Eyck and their successors painted grisaille figures on the outsides of the wings of triptychs, including the Ghent Altarpiece. Originally these were the sides on display for most of the time, as the doors were normally kept closed except on feast days or at the (paid) request of tourists. However, today these images are typically unseen in museums, the triptych displayed in its open state, flat against a wall. In these cases, imitation of sculpture was intended, as sculpture remained more expensive than a painting, even one by an acknowledged master.

Limners often produced illuminated manuscripts in pen and wash with a very limited colour range, and many artists such as Jean Pucelle (active c. 1320–1350) and Matthew Paris specialised in such work, which had been especially common in England since Anglo-Saxon times. Renaissance artists such as Mantegna and Polidoro da Caravaggio often used grisaille to imitate the effect of a classical sculptured relief or Roman painting.

In the Low Countries, a continuous tradition of grisaille painting can be traced from Early Netherlandish painting to Martin Heemskerck (1498–1574), Pieter Brueghel the Elder (Christ and the Woman Taken in Adultery, 1565) and Hendrik Goltzius, and through the copious output of Adriaen van de Venne, to the circle of Rembrandt and Jan van Goyen.

Portions of the ceiling frescoes of the Sistine Chapel are executed in grisaille, as is the lower section of the great staircase decoration by Antonio Verrio (c. 1636 – 1707) at Hampton Court.

=== Modern examples ===
Grisaille, while less widespread in the 20th century, persists as an artistic technique. Pablo Picasso's painting Guernica (1937) stands as a prominent example.

Contemporary American painter Hugo Bastidas has become known for black-and-white paintings that imitate the effect of grisaille and often resemble black-and-white photographs. His medium- and large-scale paintings feature contrasting zones of high and low detail.

=== Enamel and stained glass ===
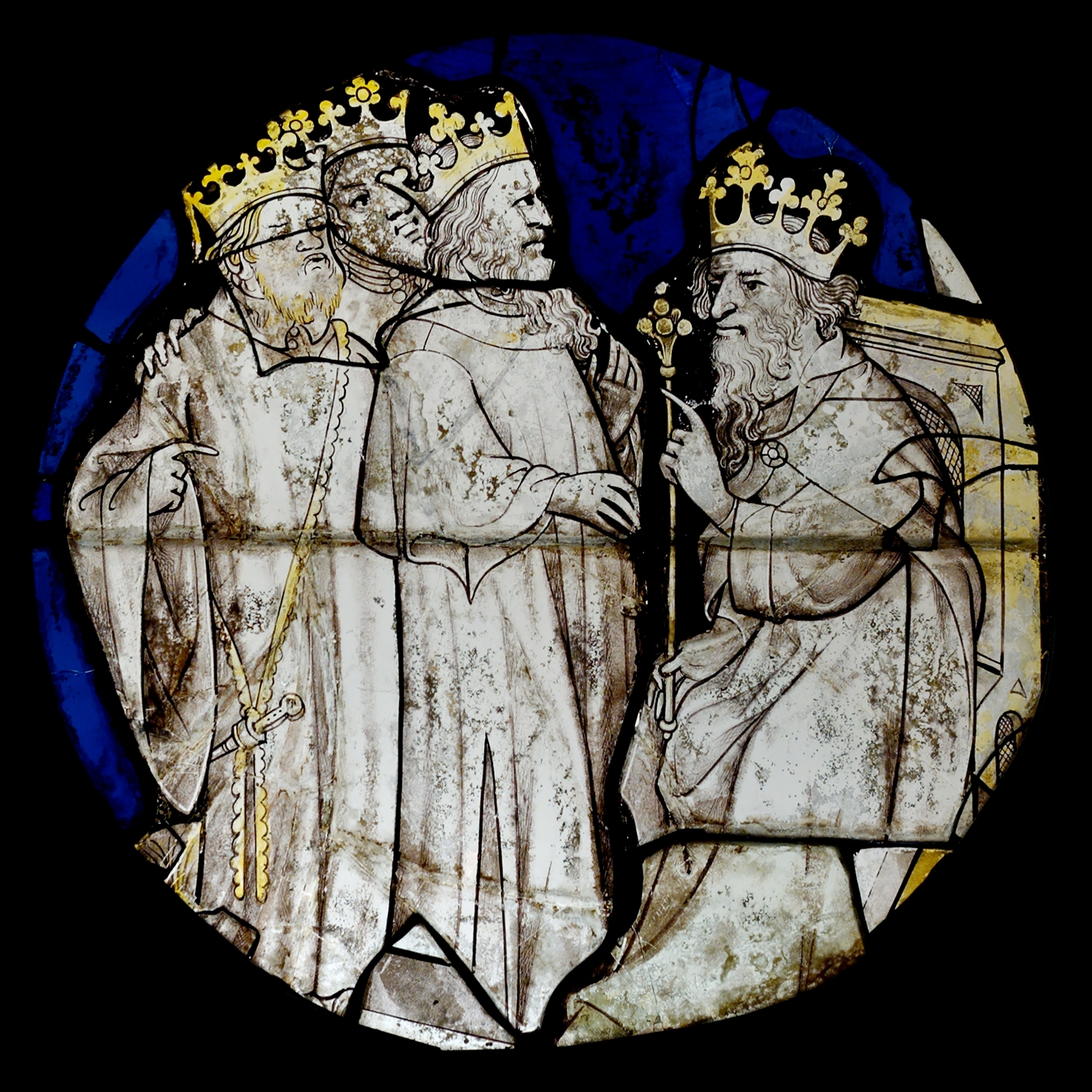
Grisaille stained glass (15th century)

The term is also applied to monochrome painting in other media such as those involving enamels, in which an effect similar to a relief in silver may be intended. Grisaille is also common in stained glass, as the need for sections in different colours is greatly reduced, such as York Minster's Five Sisters window. Portions of a window may be done in grisaille using, for example, silver stain or vitreous paint, while other sections are coloured glass.

== Brunaille and verdaille ==
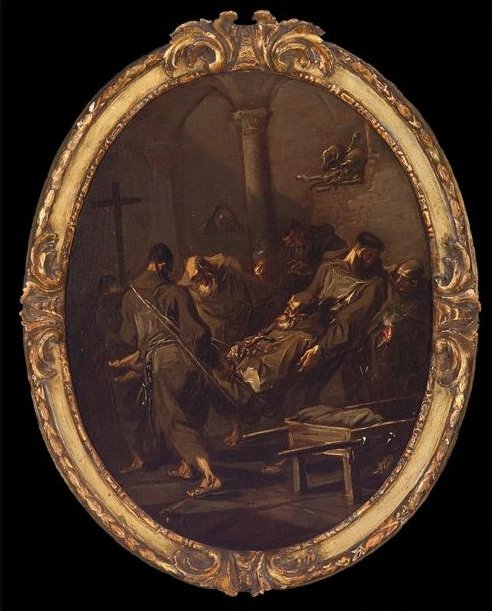
Burial of a Franciscan Friar, oil on canvas brunaille by Allessandro Magnasco, c. 1730

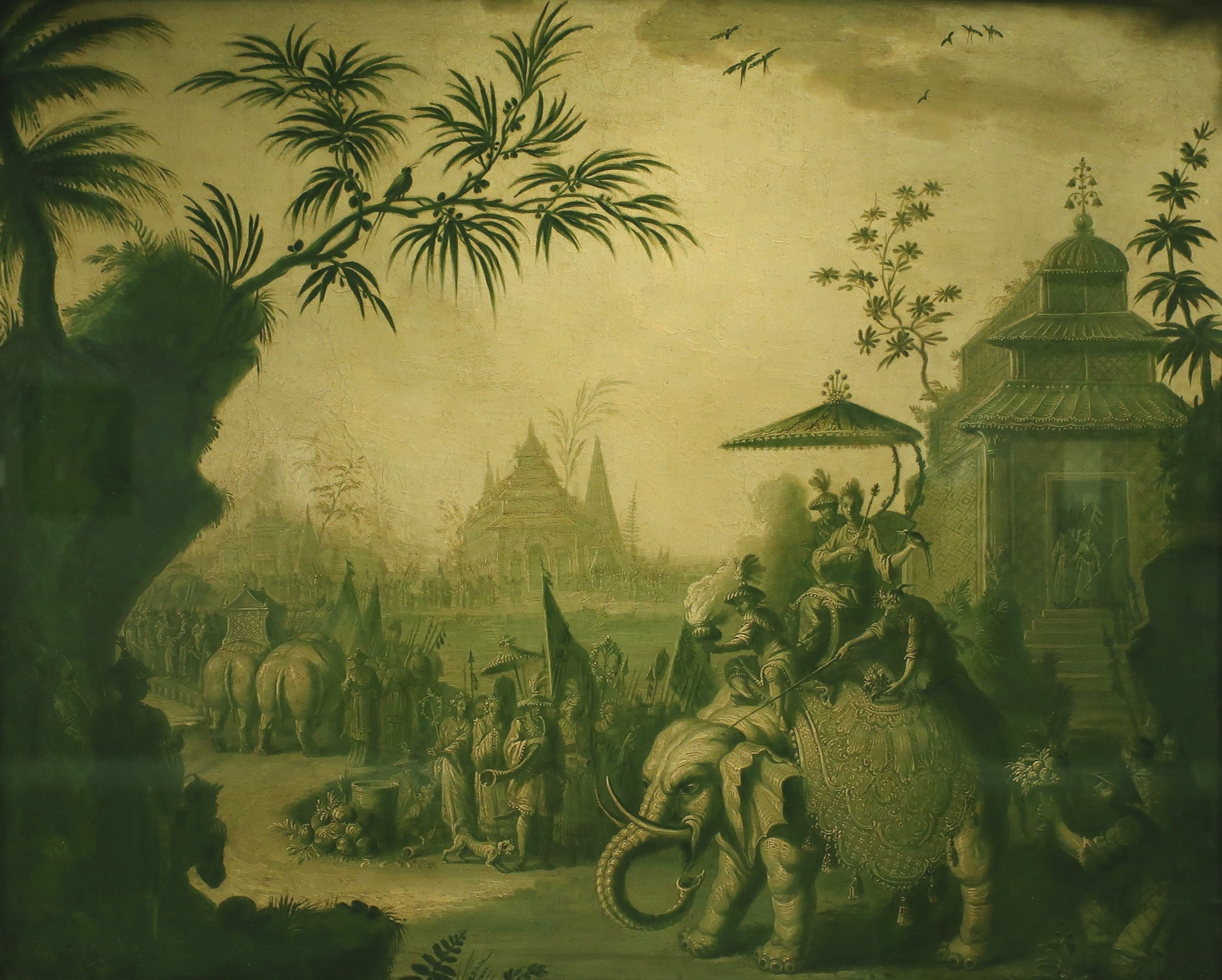
A Chinoiserie Procession of Figures Riding on Elephants with Temples Beyond, oil on canvas verdaille by Jean-Baptiste Pillement.

Monochrome work is sometimes executed in colours other than grey: a brunaille is a painting executed entirely or primarily in shades of brown, while a verdaille is the same for green. Such works are said to have been painted en brunaille or en verdaille, respectively.

Brunaille and verdaille painting both have their roots in 12th century stained glass made for Cistercian monasteries, which prohibited the use of coloured art in 1134. The term "brunaille" was first used to refer to all-brown paintings in the 17th century.

== Gallery ==
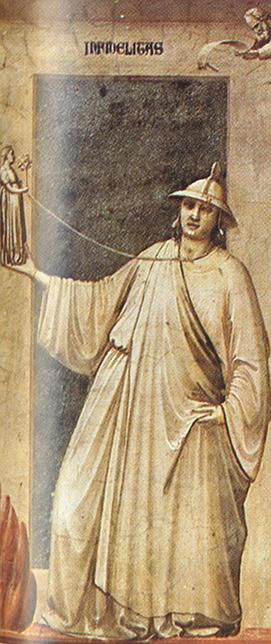
Giotto, Scrovegni Chapel, Infidelity

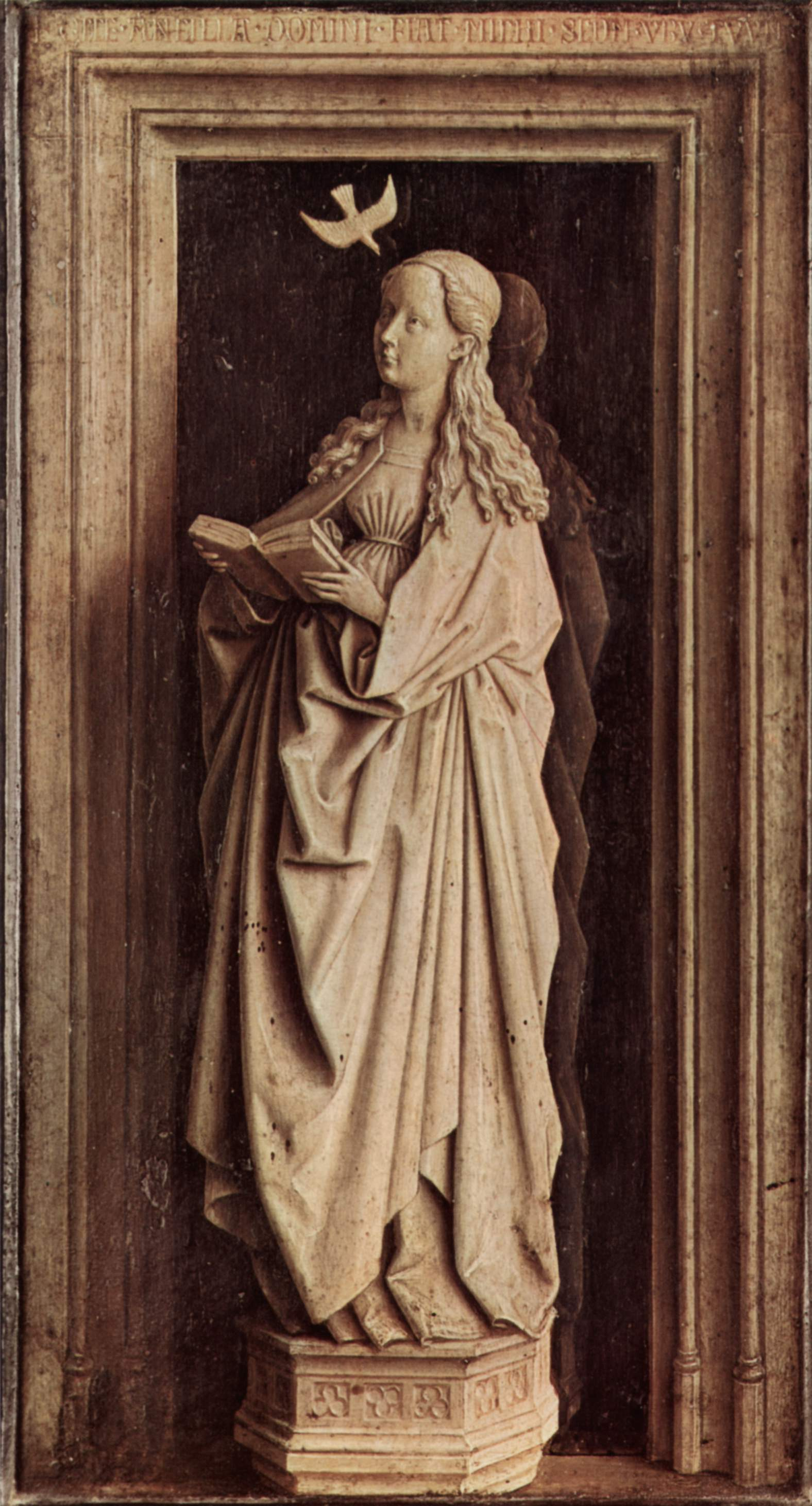
Jan van Eyck, Annunciation (Gabriel is on the opposite wing)

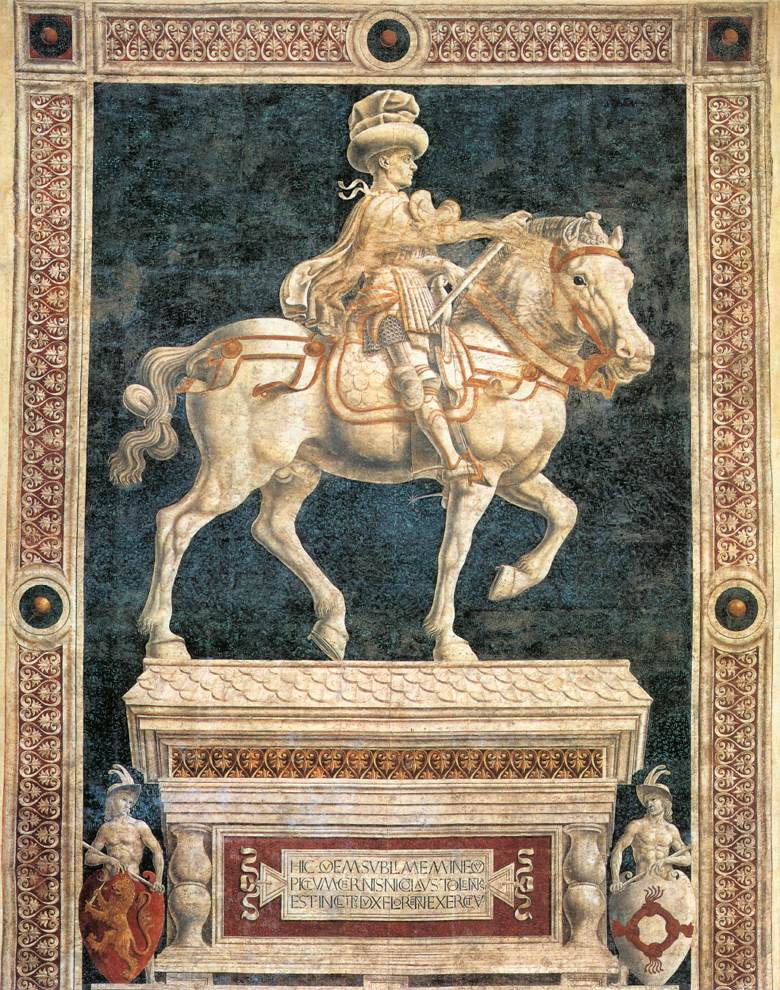
Andrea del Castagno, monument to Niccolò da Tolentino

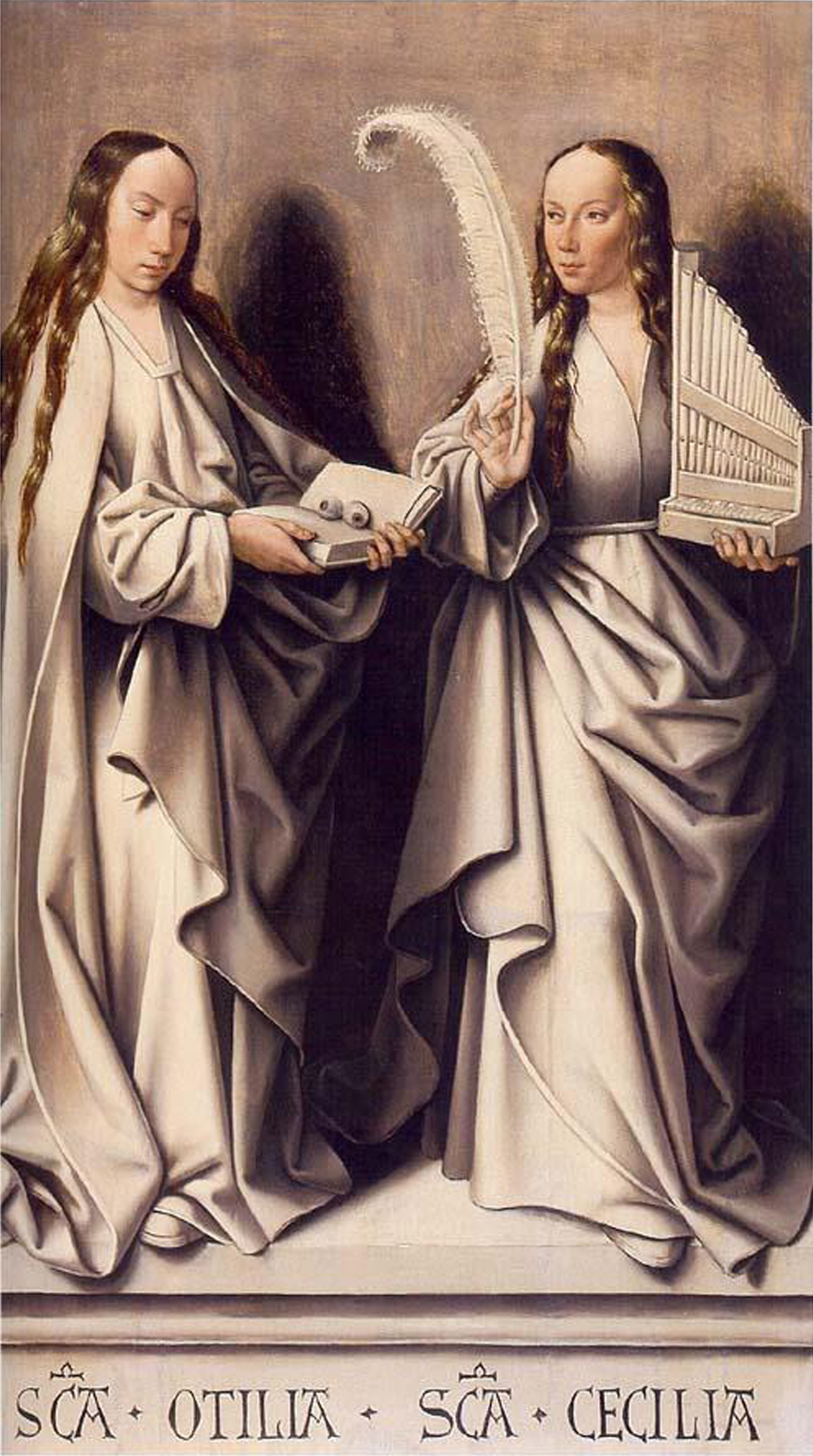
Master of Frankfurt, Saint Odile and Saint Cecilia, ca. 1503–1506, oil on panel, Historical Museum, Frankfurt

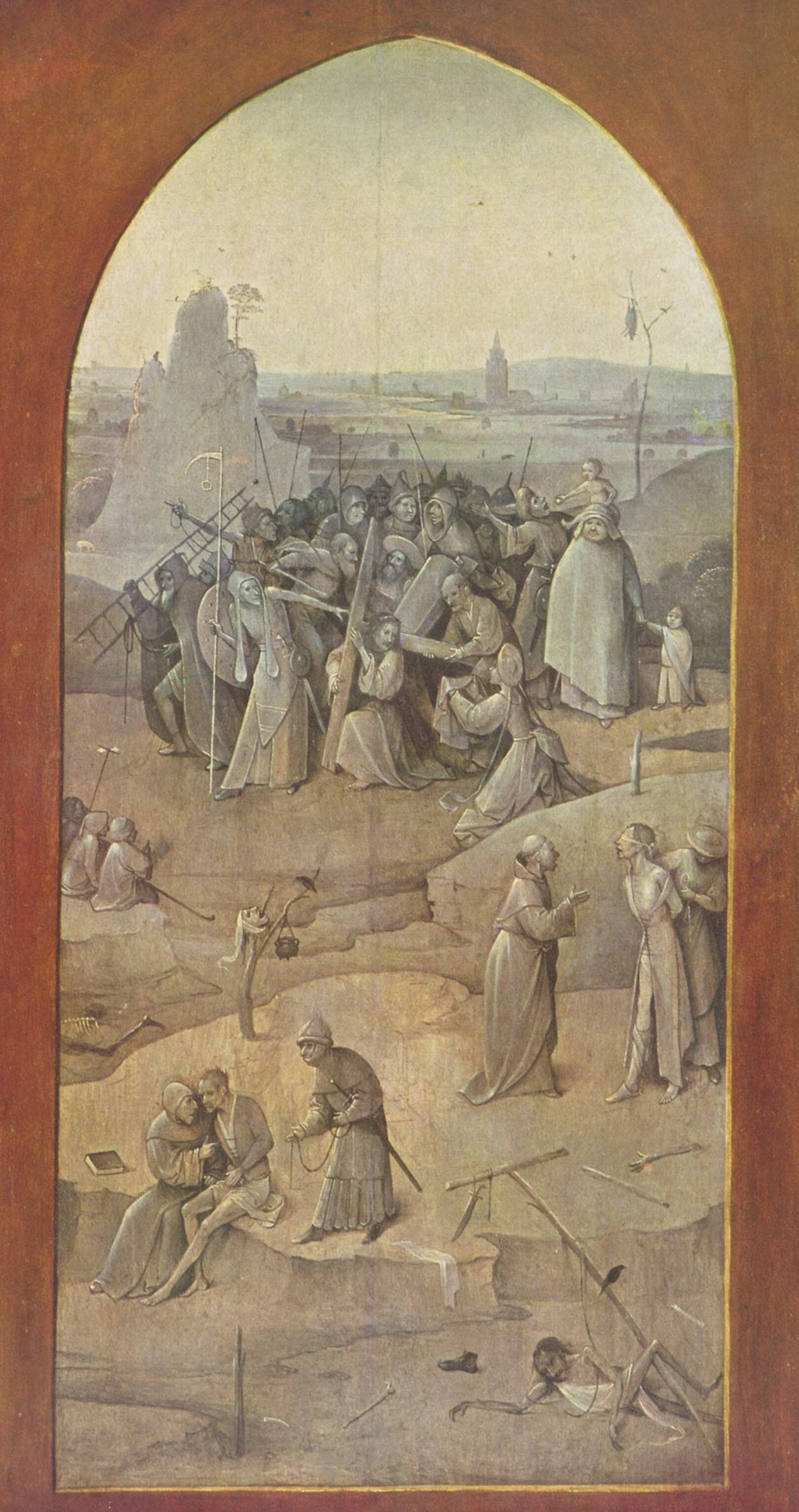
Triptych shutter outside panel by Hieronymus Bosch

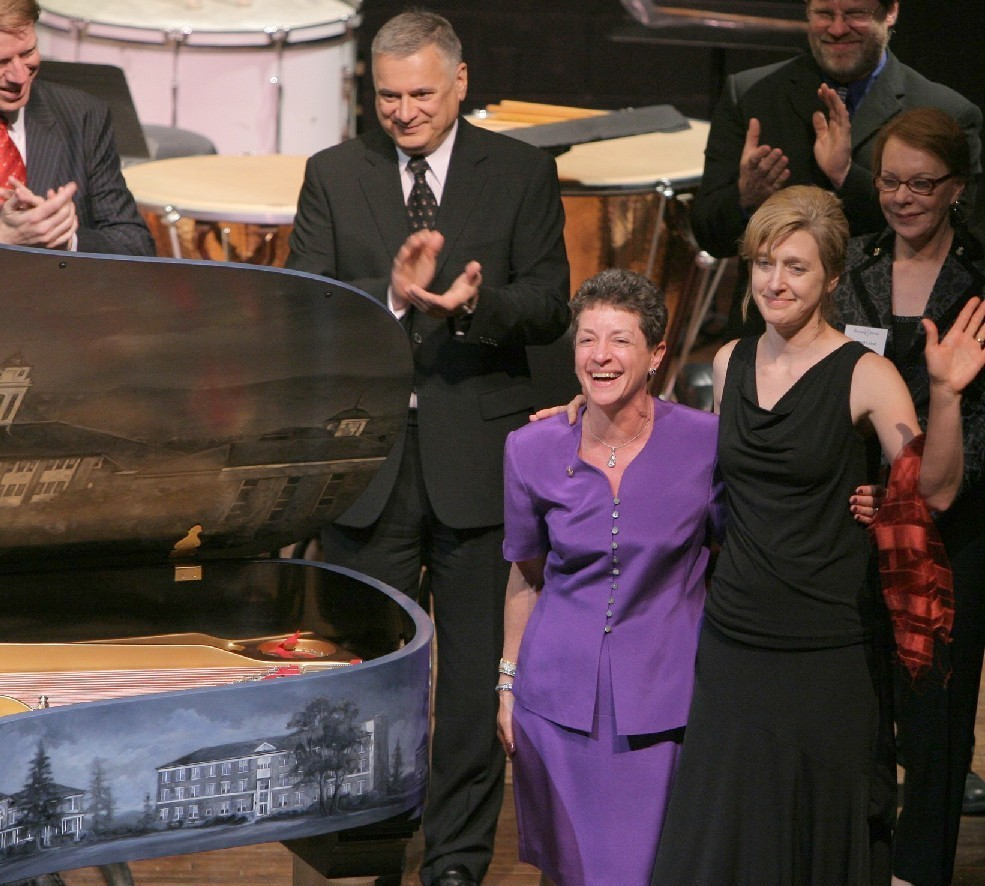
2008 unveiling ceremony at The Kennedy Center of a Steinway Art Case piano painted in grisaille

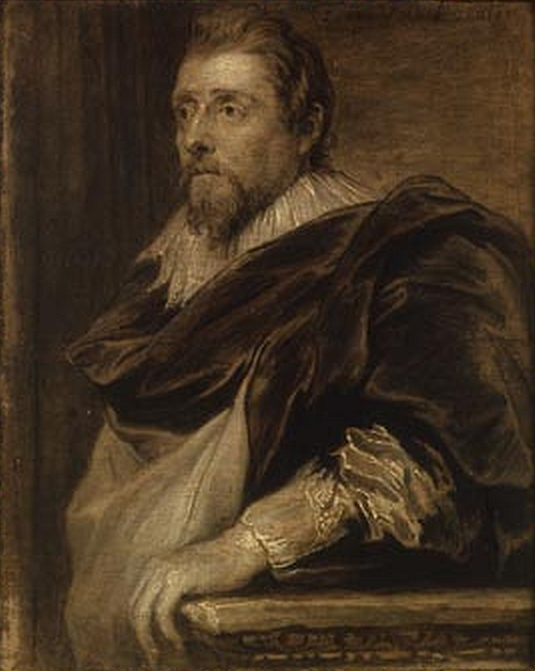
Frans Francken II by Anthony van Dyck, one of a series of studies for portrait prints

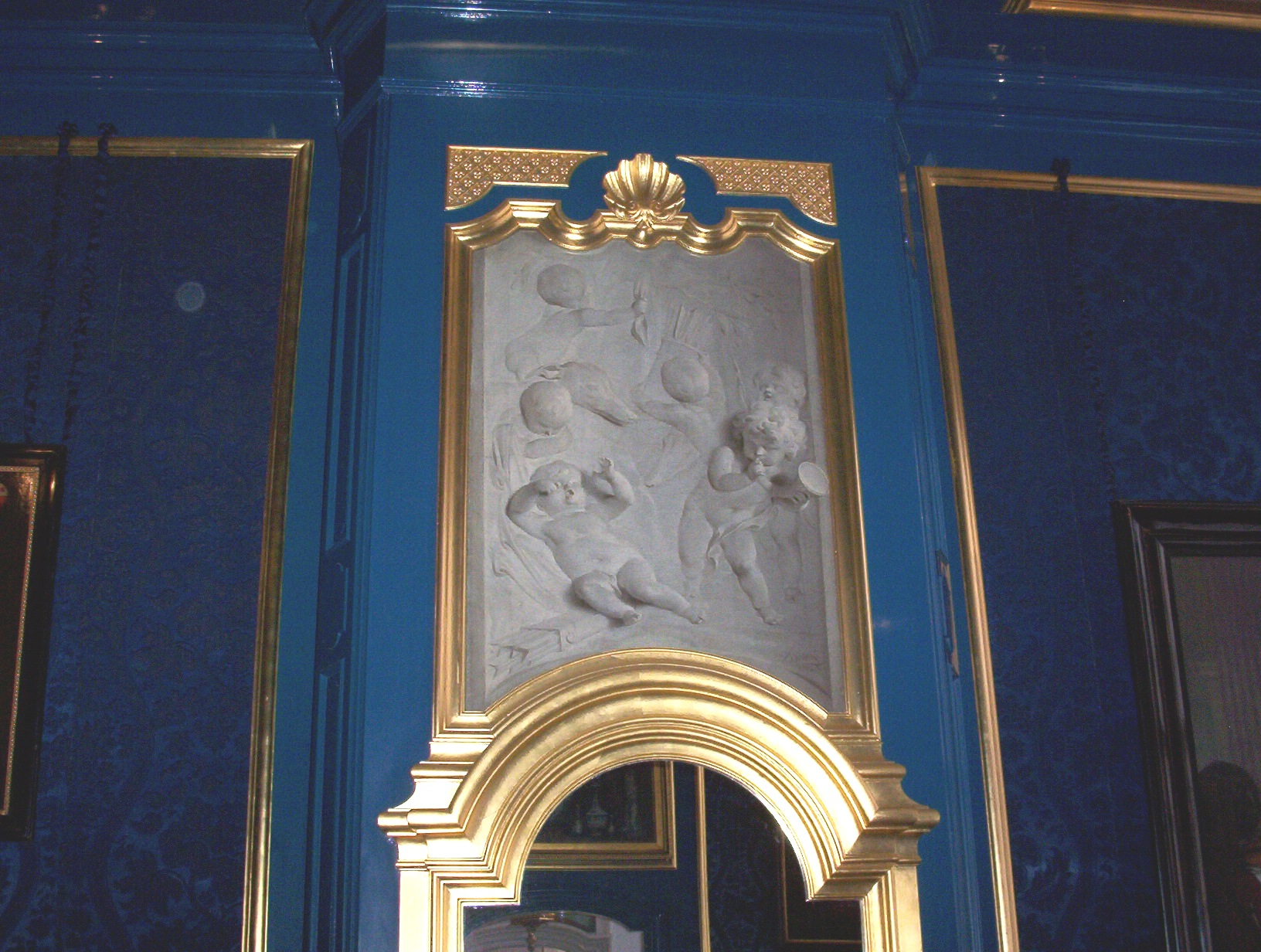
Trompe-l'œil wall grisaille in Amsterdam by Jacob de Wit, 1730s

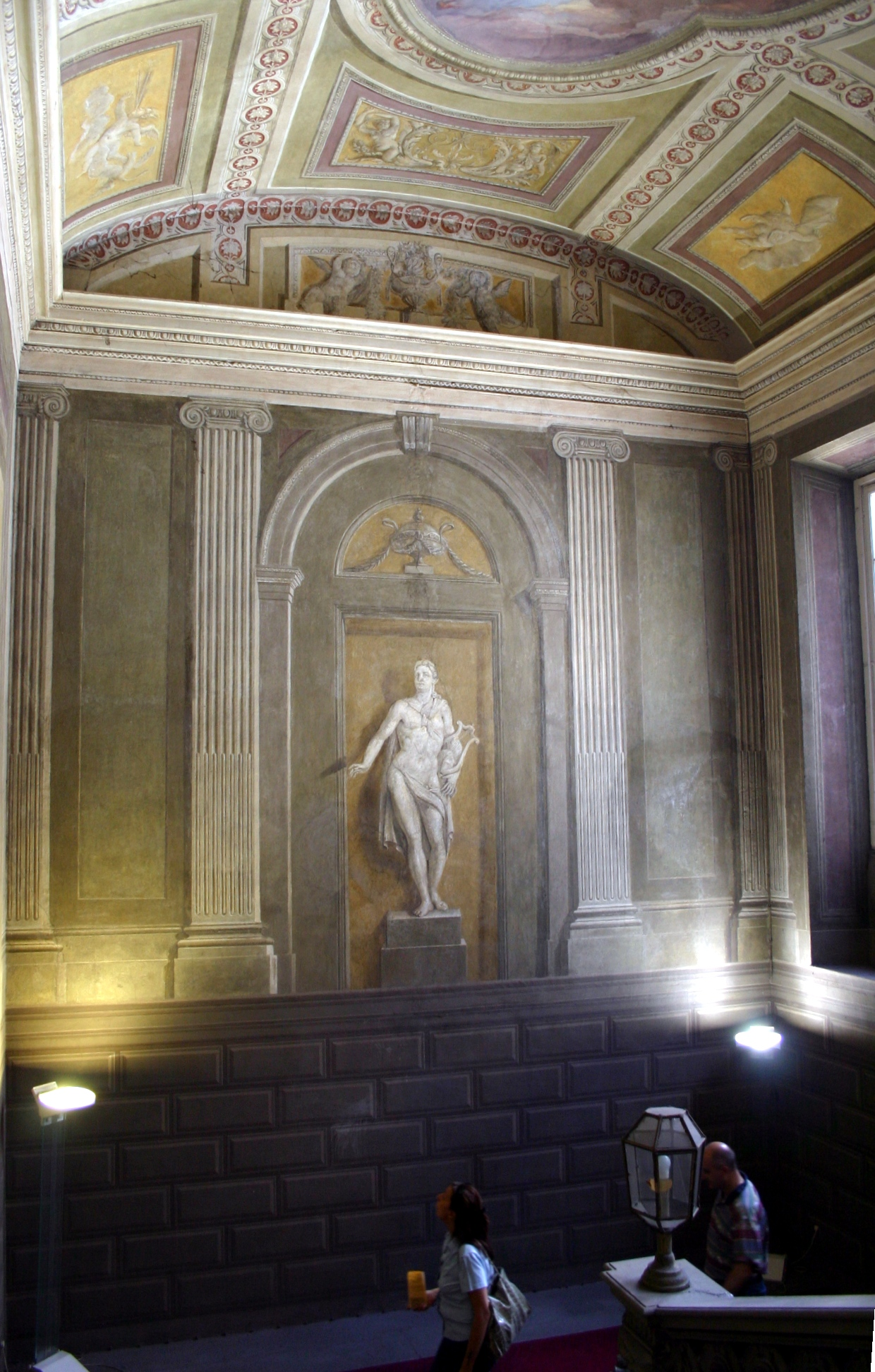
Italian palace staircase, 18th century

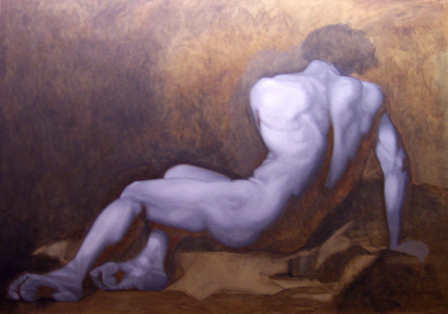
Student copy in grisaille after Jacques-Louis David

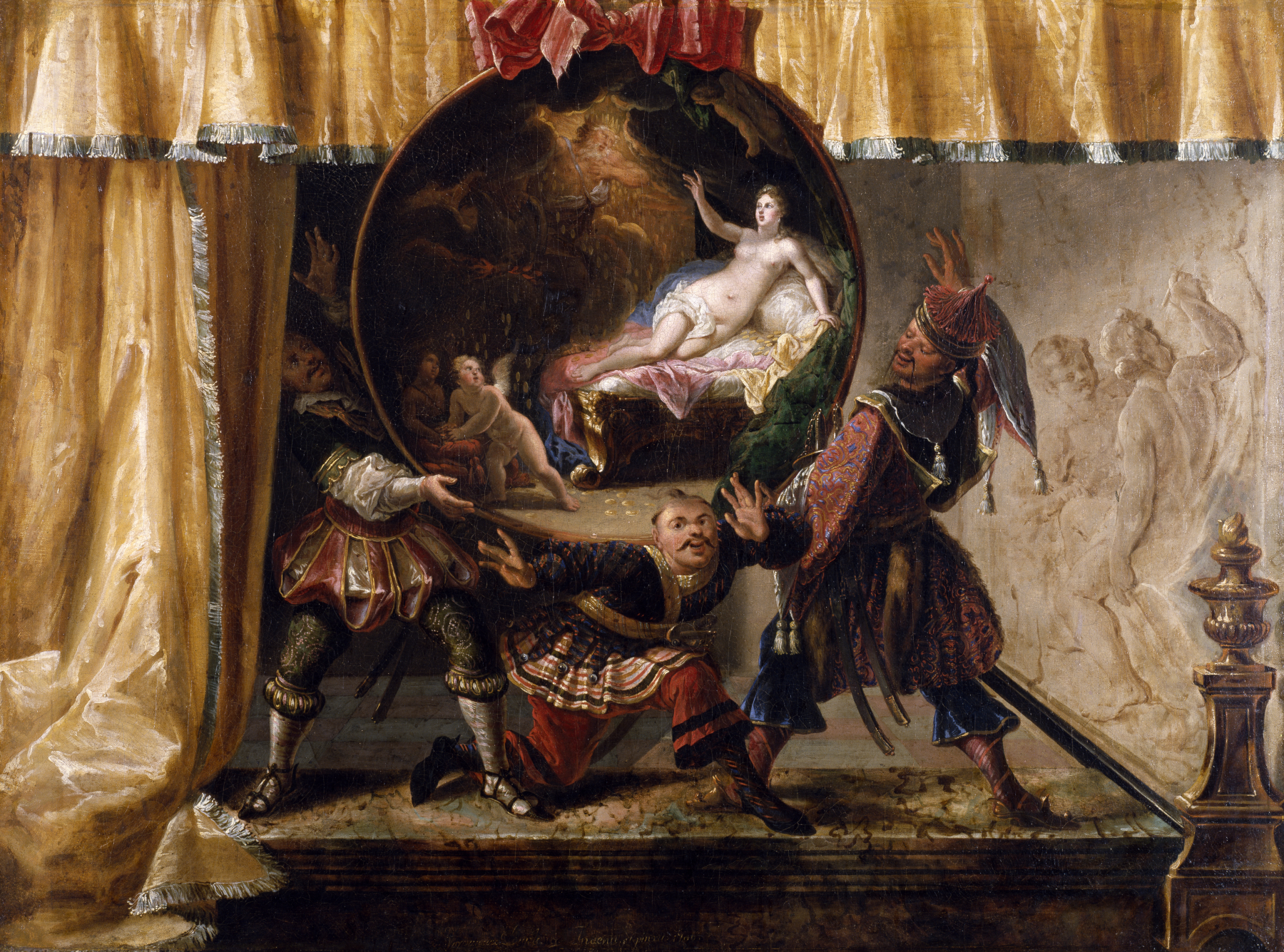
Painted Fire Screen by Jacques Vigoureux Duplessis, The Walters Art Museum. The pair of figures on the right are in grisaille.

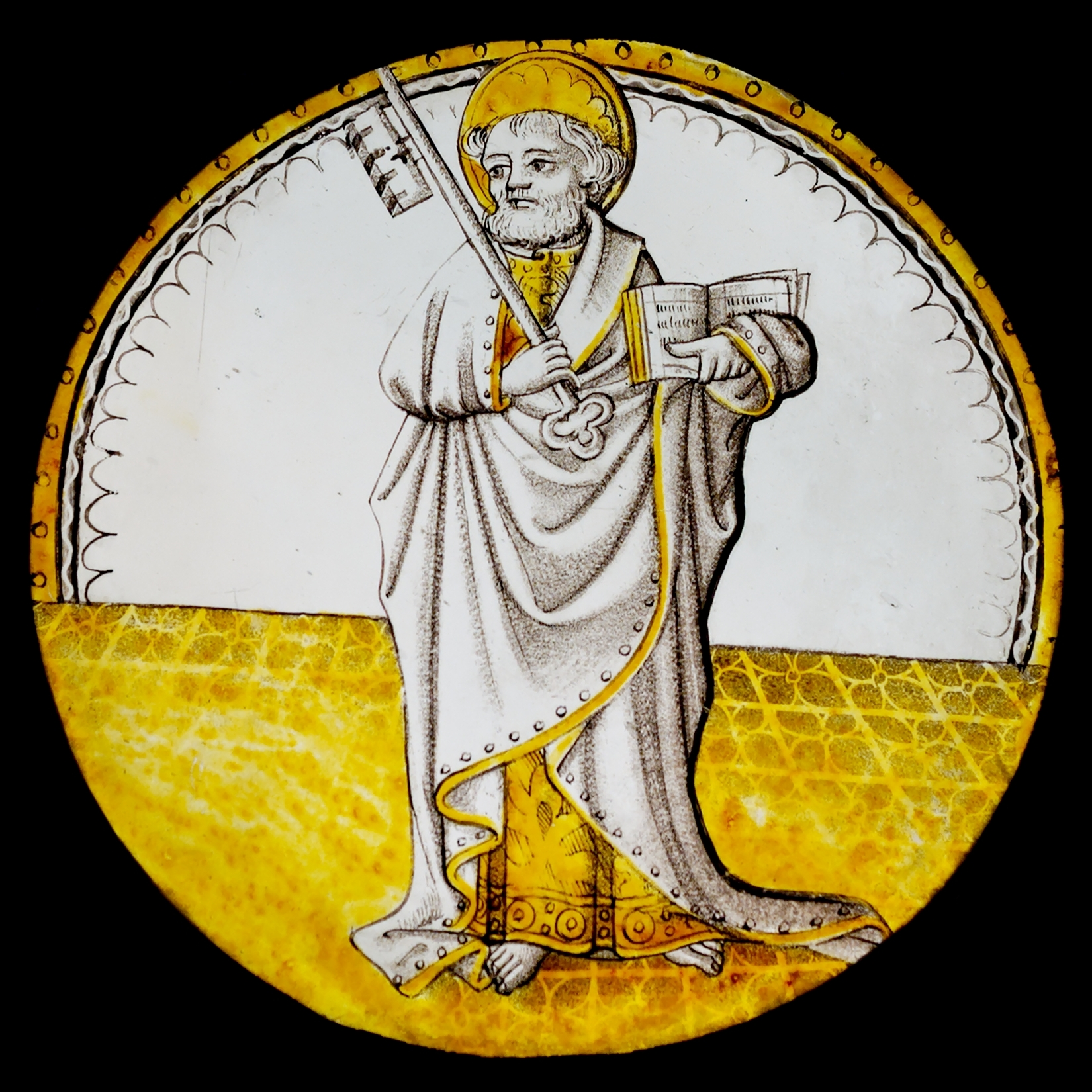
Window of St. Peter: Stained glass (white glass, grisaille and silver sulfide) and lead, France, ca. 1500–1510

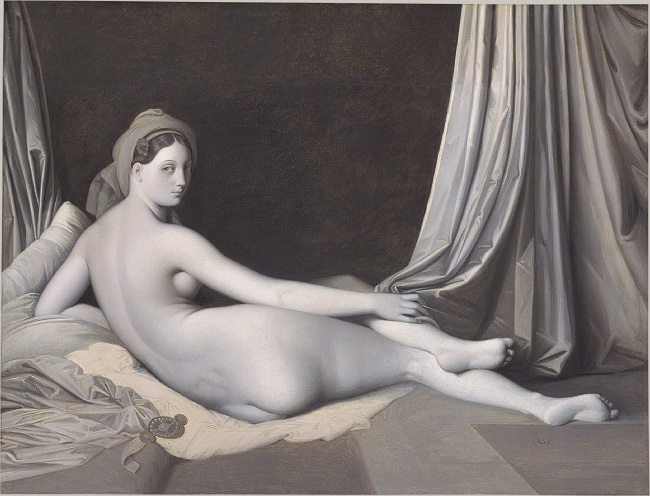
A version of his Grande Odalisque in grisaille, by Ingres and his workshop

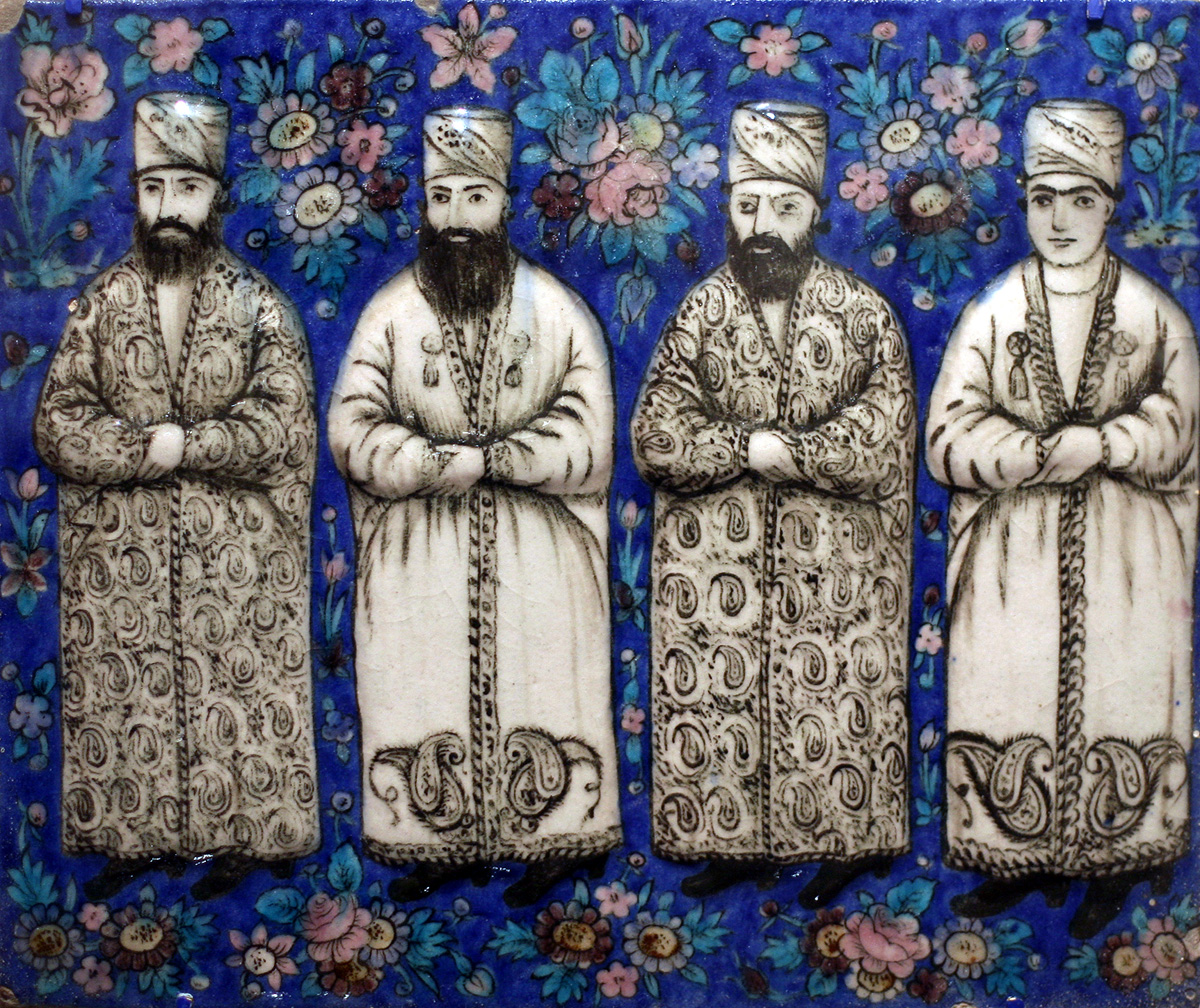
Molded tile, mid-19th century Iran, Brooklyn Museum

== See also ==
- Aizuri-e — ukiyo-e prints executed primarily or entirely in blue
- Monochrome painting — abstract art executed in a single color
- Pablo Picasso's Blue Period and Rose Period
- Sepia tone (photography)
