= Cityarts Workshop =

American nonprofit organization

- Type: Non-Profit
- Founded: 1971
- Headquarters: New York, NY, US
- Key people: Susan Shapiro Kiok, Susan Caruso-Green, James Jannuzzi

Cityarts Workshop was a nonprofit community mural arts organization incorporated in 1971. Cityarts Workshop often employed lead artists to work within various communities to create murals. In the 1970, Cityarts Workshop created several murals by and for communities of color, three of which were in Chinatown with lead artists Tomie Aria and Alan Okada.

== History ==
In 1968 the New York City Parks, Recreation, and Cultural Affairs Administration, now known as the New York City Department of Cultural Affairs, began a program called the New York City Community Arts Project. As its director they hired Susan Shapiro Kiok. In 1971, Susan incorporated CITYarts Workshop as a non-profit arts organization. Susan was inspired by the community mural work being done by Robert J. Fox (pastor)'s Summer in the City (city program) in 1967 in the New York neighborhoods of East Village, East Harlem, and South Bronx. Cityarts Workshop closed down in 1988 and was re-established as CITYarts, Inc. in 1989

== People ==
=== Lead mural artists ===
- Tomie Arai
- Susan Caruso-Green
- Maria Dominguez
- Alfredo Hernandez
- Lee Quiñones
- James Jannuzzi
- Alan Okada
