= Joseph La Piana =

American painter

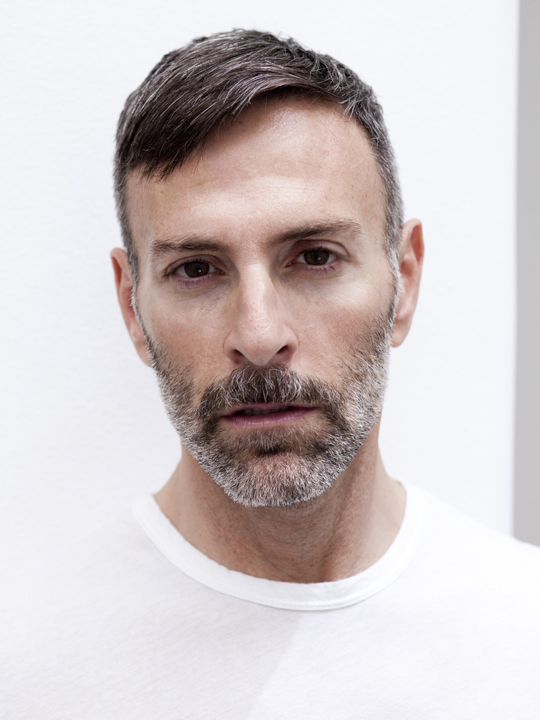
- Born: 1966; Brooklyn, New York, US
- Known for: Artist
- Website: josephlapiana.com

Joseph La Piana (born 1966) is an American artist based in Brooklyn.

== Work ==
La Piana’s body of work includes sculptures, works on paper, and paintings. Earlier exhibitions by La Piana include “The Los Angeles Text Project 2,” curated by Eric Shiner and presented by the Andy Warhol Foundation in 2011. In 2008 and 2013, La Piana exhibited works at New York’s Robert Miller Gallery.

== Tension Series ==
In 2015, La Piana exhibited “Tension,” a site-specific installation utilizing 2,600 feet of yellow latex to adorn the interior of a warehouse in Red Hook, Brooklyn. In 2019, La Piana installed his multi-site “Tension Sculpture” series along New York’s Park Avenue, located between 53rd and 70th street. The installation was presented by the New York City Department of Parks and the Fund for Park Avenue. Consisting of five sculptures with varying dimensions, the pieces incorporate yellow synthetic rubber stretched between stainless steel armatures.

== Personal life ==
Born to Italian immigrants, La Piana was born in Brooklyn, raised in Queens, and now lives and works in Brooklyn. In an interview with Life + Times, La Piana said he often would draw, paint, and sculpt anything he could get his hands onto from an early age.

== Education and art career ==
La Piana received a bachelor's degree from Florida State University in 1988. He has been described as a self-taught artist, in the context that he did not participate in any program where his studies related to art. La Piana has lived in Manhattan for nearly his entire life, aside from a 10-year period during which he lived in California.

== Exhibitions ==
- Park Avenue Tension Sculptures, Park Avenue New York - 2019
- Tension & 30 Contiguous Works, Denis Gardarin Gallery, Red Hook Brooklyn (Solo) - 2015
- Robert Miller Gallery, New York City, NY (Solo and Group) - 2008 & 2013
- The Andy Warhol Museum, Venice Biennale, Italy, The Venice Text Project (Solo) - 2011
- The Andy Warhol Museum, Los Angeles, The Los Angeles Text Project2 (Solo) - 2011
- Fireplace Projects, East Hampton, NY (Group) - 2007
- Leila Heller Gallery, New York, NY (Solo and Group) - 2004, 2005, and 2006
- Chac Mool Gallery, Los Angeles (Solo) - 2004
