= Gyeongnam Art Museum =

- 경남도립미술관
- Location within South Korea
- Established: June 23, 2004
- Location: Changwon, South Korea
- Coordinates: 35.2395°N 128.6908°E
- Type: Art Museum
- Website: eng.gam.go.kr

Gyeongnam Art Museum is an art museum in Changwon, South Korea. Initial planning began in 1998, and the museum opened on June 23, 2004.
