= Elizabeth Demaray =

American sculptor

- Education: University of California, Berkeley, California (BA, 1991; MFA, 1999)
- Known for: Environmental art, conceptual art, sculpture
- Awards: Wallace Alexander Gerbode Foundation Award (2000); National Studio Award (2002); Aldrich Emerging Artist Award (2003)
- Website: elizabethdemaray.org

Elizabeth Demaray is a sculptor and interdisciplinary artist known for her inquiries into the interface between the built and the natural environment.

Demaray has created listening stations for birds that play human music, fabricated alternative forms of housing for hermit crabs from artificial materials, and built light-sensing robotic supports that allow potted plants to roam freely in search of sunlight and water.

Demaray is an associate professor of fine arts] and head of the sculpture concentration at Rutgers University–Camden. She lives and works in Brooklyn.

== Education ==
Demaray received a BA in cognitive psychology at the University of California, Berkeley and a MFA in Art Practice at the University of California at Berkeley. She also studied art at the Skowhegan School of Painting and Sculpture.

== Career ==
In 2005, Demaray, who upholstered stones and knitted sweaters for plants as part of a campaign that she described as "inappropriate care-giving activities," sewed a 27-foot long upholstered cozy for a dormant 10-ton Nike-Hercules Missile in Sausalito, CA. Her Sticks and Stones: The Nike Missile Cozy Project was designed to show the nature of warfare and to familiarize the public with what served as the U.S. land to air defense during the Cold War.

In 2006, Demaray designed and produced tiny man-made houses for hermit crabs to address a housing shortage that may have resulted from the over-collecting of seashells by humans. Demaray worked with a paleontologist and a mechanical engineer to design the structures for The Hand Up Project, Attempting to Meet the New Needs of Natural Life Forms.

In 2007, Demaray worked with video artist John Walsh to create Inside/Outside: Habitat, on view at the Abington Art Center's Sculpture Park in Jenkintown, Pennsylvania. The project was designed to explore the musical tastes of local birds, which were offered a selection classical, rock, country and jazz music when they visited 10-foot perches. Demaray said her purpose was to encourage people to think about the impact that humans have on other species.

In 2010, Demaray worked with an ant researcher at the American Museum of Natural History to create Corpor Esurit, or we all deserve a break today. The artwork offered a colony of ants food from McDonald's to present a commentary on the effects of the American diet on the creatures that depend on humans for food.

In 2011, Demaray collaborated with lichen researcher Natalie Howe to grow lichen on several buildings in New York City. The objective of her project, Lichen for Skyscrapers, was to connect New Yorkers with the natural world in an immediate way.

In a 2012 essay, Richard Klein, exhibitions director at The Aldrich Contemporary Art Museum, described Demaray's work:

Demaray provokes complex questions concerning memory, knowledge, and the collaborative cognitive process that exists between artist and viewer, while making a body of work that has consistently confounded expectations by creating connections between diverse and often contradictory bodies of knowledge.

In 2013, Demaray collaborated with engineer Dr. Qingze Zou to create the IndaPlant Project: An Act of Trans-Species Giving. They built autonomously guided light-sensing robotic platforms for houseplants called "floraborgs," which allow potted plants to roam freely in a domestic environment in search of water and sunlight, and alert other floraborgs to their locations. In an article for Quartz, Christopher Mims wrote, "IndaPlant is the first effort to make plants active participants in their own care. It may be a small step for engineers, but it's a giant evolutionary leap for plant-kind".

=== Teaching ===
Demaray is an associate professor of fine arts and head of the sculpture concentration at Rutgers University–Camden. She also is a work group advisor to Rutgers University–New Brunswick's Department of Aerospace and Mechanical Engineering and co-founder of the DigiHuman Laboratory in its Department of Computer Science, which is dedicated to supporting artistic practice in the fields of computer vision and machine learning. She is an alumna of the board of the College Art Association's New Media Caucus and is a member of the Leonardo Education and Art Forum (LEAF).

== Recognition ==
Demaray has received numerous awards and honors. She received awards from the National Studio Award at the New York Museum of Modern Art /P.S.1 Contemporary Art Center, the New York Foundation for the Arts NYFA Fellowship in Sculpture, and the Aldrich Contemporary Art Museum.

== Exhibitions ==
Demaray's work has been exhibited globally. Her galleries and exhibits include the New York MOMA/P.S.1 Contemporary Art Center, the New Museum (New York), DADAPost (Berlin, DE), the Lloyd Digital Lab (Amsterdam, NL), the Center d'Art Marnay Art Center (Marnay-sur-Seine, FR), and the M.H. de Young Memorial Museum (San Francisco, CA).

== Collections ==
Demaray's work is held in the permanent collections of The New Museum, New York, NY; di Rosa Preserve and Foundation, Napa, CA; Francis J. Greenberg Foundation, New York, NY; Oakland Museum of California, Oakland, CA; and the UC Berkeley Art Museum, Berkeley, CA.

== Personal ==
Demaray is married to art professor and painter Hugo Bastidas, noted for his large-scale black and white paintings that span geographic and historic time-frames.
