= Marnay-sur-Seine =

Commune in Grand Est, France

- Commune
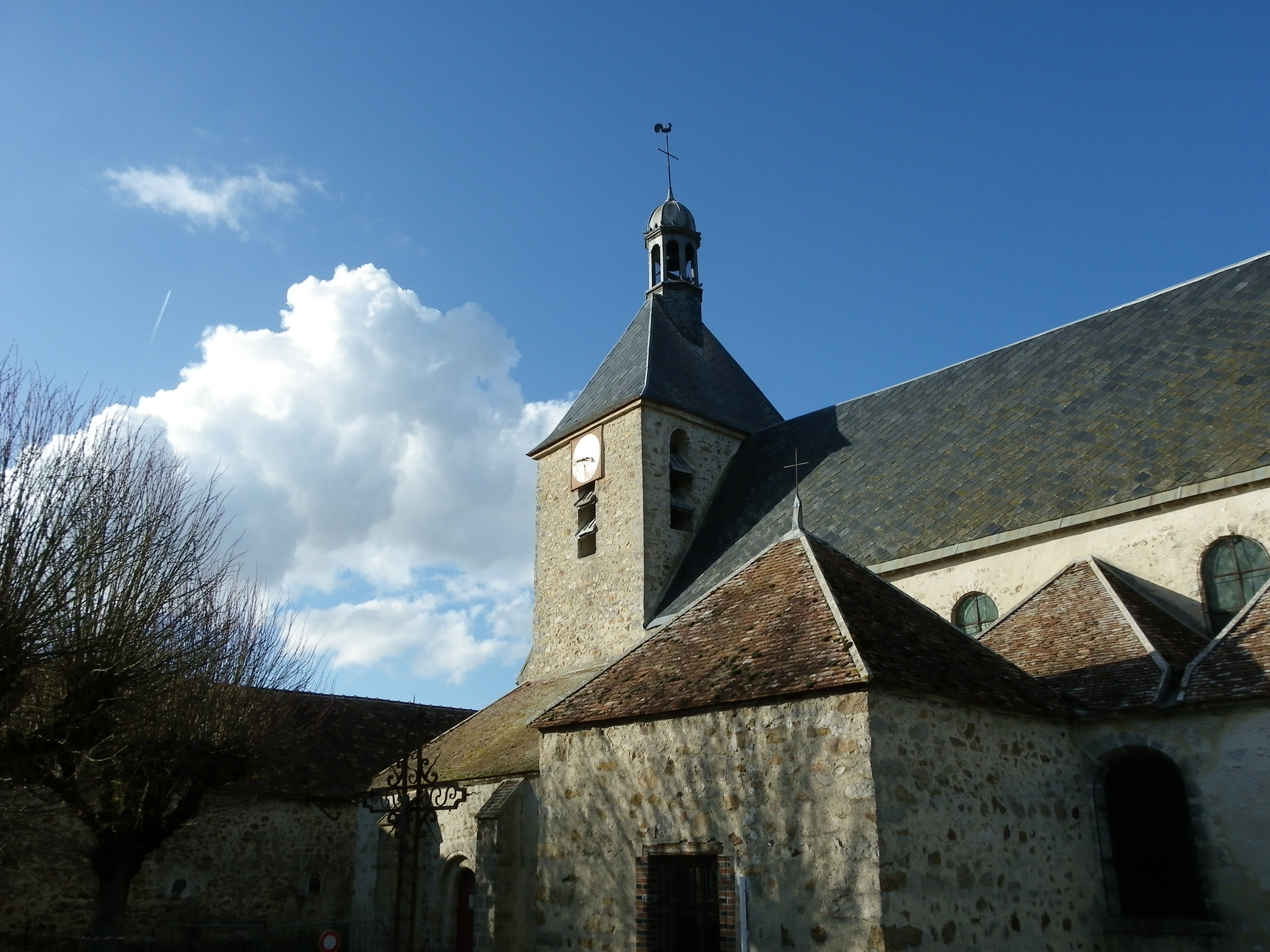
- The church in Marnay-sur-Seine
- Location of Marnay-sur-Seine
- Location within France Location within Grand Est
- Coordinates: 48°30′46″N 3°33′33″E
- Country: France
- Region: Grand Est
- Department: Aube
- Arrondissement: Nogent-sur-Seine
- Canton: Nogent-sur-Seine
- Intercommunality: Nogentais

Government
  - Mayor (2020–2026): Yolande François
- Area^{1}: 10.1 km^{2} (3.9 sq mi)
- Elevation: 68 m (223 ft)
- Population (2023): 234
  - Density: 23.2/km^{2} (60.0/sq mi)
- Time zone: UTC+01:00 (CET)
  - Summer (DST): UTC+02:00 (CEST)
- INSEE/Postal code: 10225 /10400
- ^{1} French Land Register data, which excludes lakes, ponds, glaciers > 1 km^{2} (0.386 sq mi or 247 acres) and river estuaries.

Marnay-sur-Seine (French pronunciation: [maʁnɛ syʁ sɛn], literally Marnay on Seine) is a commune in the Aube department in north-central France.

== Population ==
Historical population
Year	Pop.	±% p.a.
1968	222	—
1975	192	−2.05%
1982	203	+0.80%
1990	220	+1.01%
1999	240	+0.97%
2007	245	+0.26%
2012	231	−1.17%
2017	229	−0.17%
2023	234	+0.36%
Source: INSEE

== Sights ==
- Jardin botanique de Marnay-sur-Seine

== See also ==
- Communes of the Aube department
