= Mayer van den Bergh Breviary =

16th century manuscript

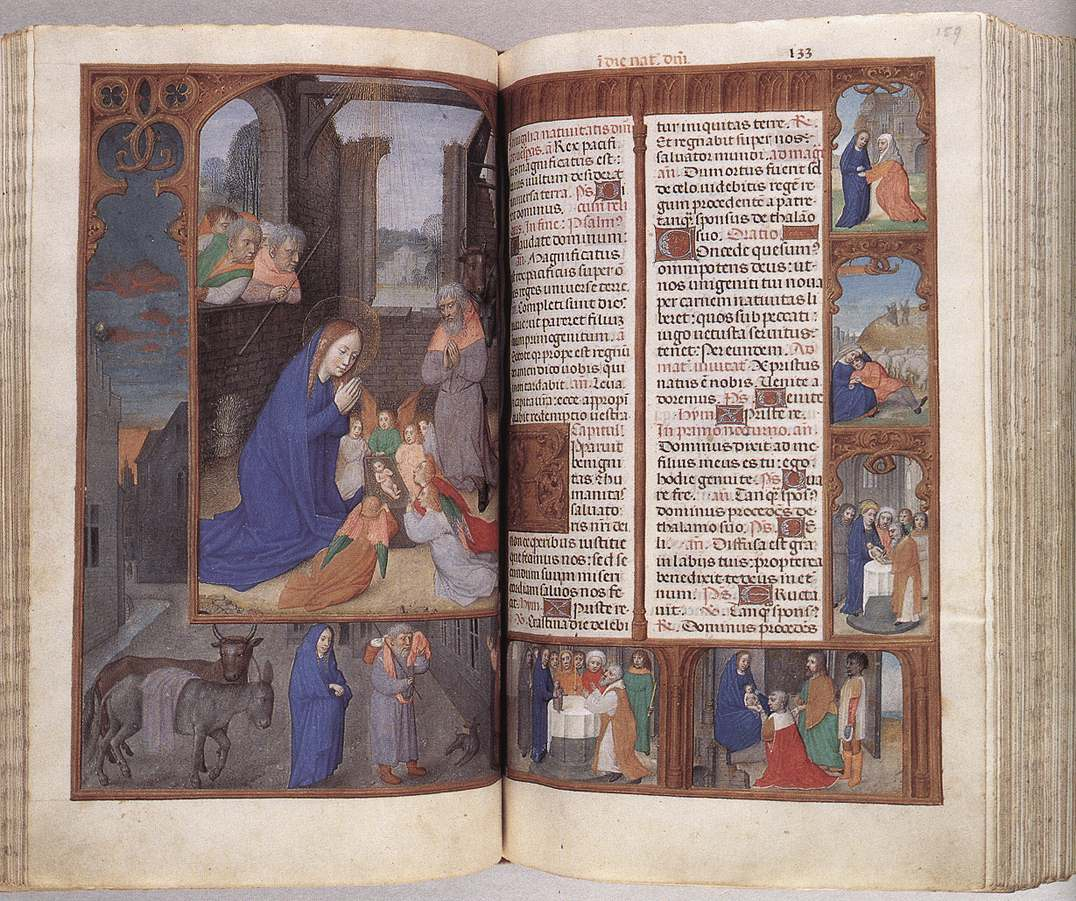
The Annunciation, a miniature in the Mayer van den Bergh Breviary by the Master of the First Prayer Book of Maximilian, the main artist of the book, and described as a "high point of his style".

The Mayer van den Bergh Breviary is a 16th-century illuminated manuscript, a breviary, currently in the collections of Museum Mayer van den Bergh in Antwerp.

The book was made at the beginning of the 16th century and belongs to a small group of luxurious manuscripts made in Flanders at this time. It has been suggested that the patron was King Manuel I of Portugal, but the lack of any direct references to the kings' ownership makes this hypothesis questionable. The breviary contains around 80 miniatures, of which 36 are full-page. The main artist responsible for the decoration was the Master of the First Prayer Book of Maximilian but the book also contains illustrations by Gerard David, the Master of James IV of Scotland and others; in total more than 12 artists were involved in decorating the book. Stylistically it contains both traditional elements and attempts at new treatment of subject matter, especially in the Psalter.

== History ==
The precise origins of the Mayer van den Bergh Breviary are not known. On stylistic grounds, it has been dated to around 1500 or possibly at a somewhat later date of around 1510–1515. It is also not known for whom the luxurious book was made. It has been suggested that the patron was King Manuel I of Portugal; the inclusion of text in Portuguese and the prominent highlighting of the king's patron saint, Jerome, would indicate this. The inclusion in the calendar of feast dates associated with the Augustinians would also indicate an association with a Portuguese layman closely associated with that order; this could well include a Portuguese king. Traditionally the manuscript has been associated with the ownership of a Portuguese king, also on account of its sumptuousness. However, the book lacks any more specific references to the king's ownership (such as the coat of arms or motto of the king). The iconography has also been described as unsuitable for a book for a king. Based on other details, e.g. references to saints particularly venerated in Florence, it has instead been suggested that the book was originally made for an Italian patron.

The book was apparently written in two stages; the first compromising i.a. the Psalter and the Temporale, and following a hiatus (possibly as a consequence of a shift of patronage) the breviary was finished. Nothing is known of the subsequent fate of the book. It appears in a private collection in Vienna towards the end of the 19th century; it may have been bought by an English dealer in 1886. In 1898 it was sold at Christie's to Fritz Mayer van den Bergh, after whom it is today named, and has since the foundation of the Museum Mayer van den Bergh been part of its collections. The manuscript is today described as one of the highlights of the museum's collections.

== Description ==
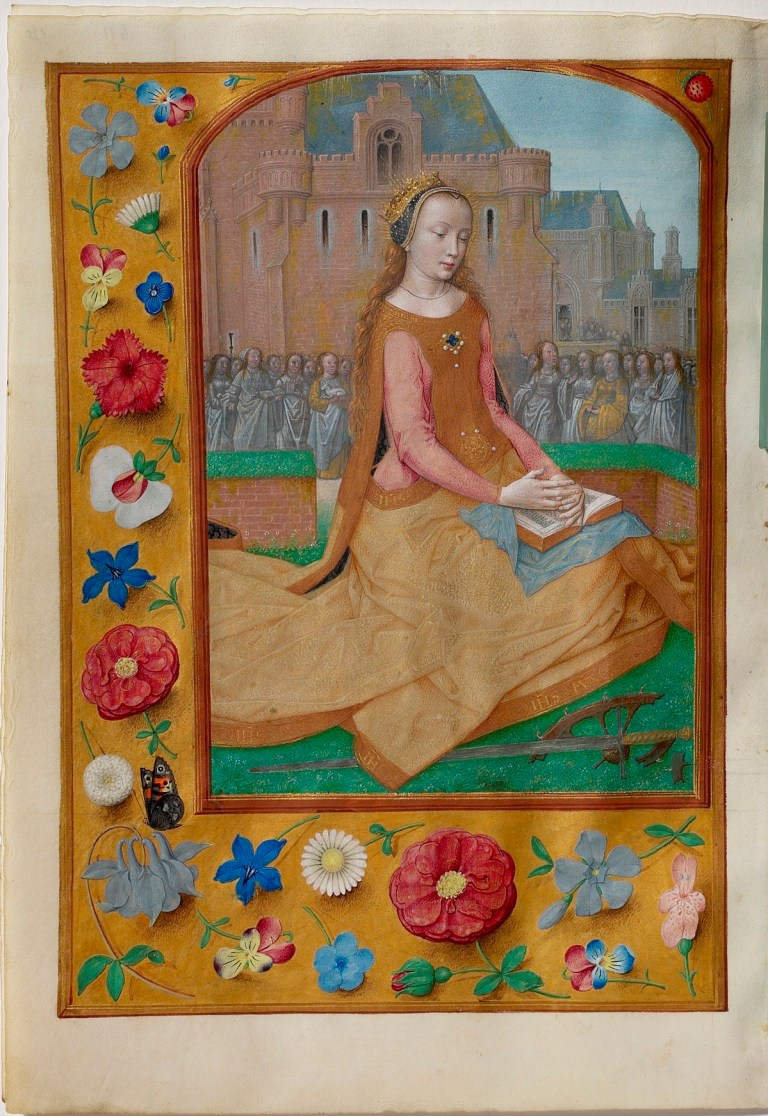
One of the full-page miniatures, depicting Saint Catherine

The book measures 224 by 160 millimetres (8.8 by 6.3 in), is written on parchment and contains in total 706 folios.

The manuscript belongs to a small group of very luxurious illuminated manuscripts produced in Flanders (probably Bruges or Ghent) during the early 16th century. It contains around 80 miniatures, including 36 full-page miniatures. These were done by more than 12 different artists. The Master of the First Prayer Book of Maximilian was the leading artist, supported by five other members of the same workshop. Miniatures are also credited to Gerard David, the Master of James IV of Scotland and others.

The treatment of the subject matter in the breviary "lies between tradition and renewal". Many miniatures, and most of the border decoration, is done according to traditional, well-known models at the time. Several miniatures in the Psalter, however, show a novel way of attempting to depict the overall meaning of certain psalms, rather than the opening words of the psalm, which was the traditional way of illustrating them. However, even the more novel miniatures draw on existing examples, e.g. designs for stained glass windows by Hugo van der Goes or, though differently modelled, examples from an illustrated Bible in the library of Raphael de Mercatellis.

== See also ==
- Ghent-Bruges school

== Sources cited ==
- Beck, Egerton (1933). "The Mayer van den Bergh Breviary". The Burlington Magazine. 62 (363): 266–279.
- Kren, Thomas; McKendrick, Scot, eds. (2003). Illuminating the Renaissance: The Triumph of Flemish Manuscript Painting in Europe. Los Angeles: Getty Publications. ISBN 0-89236-703-2.
