= Pietà (van der Weyden) =

Painting by Rogier van der Weyden

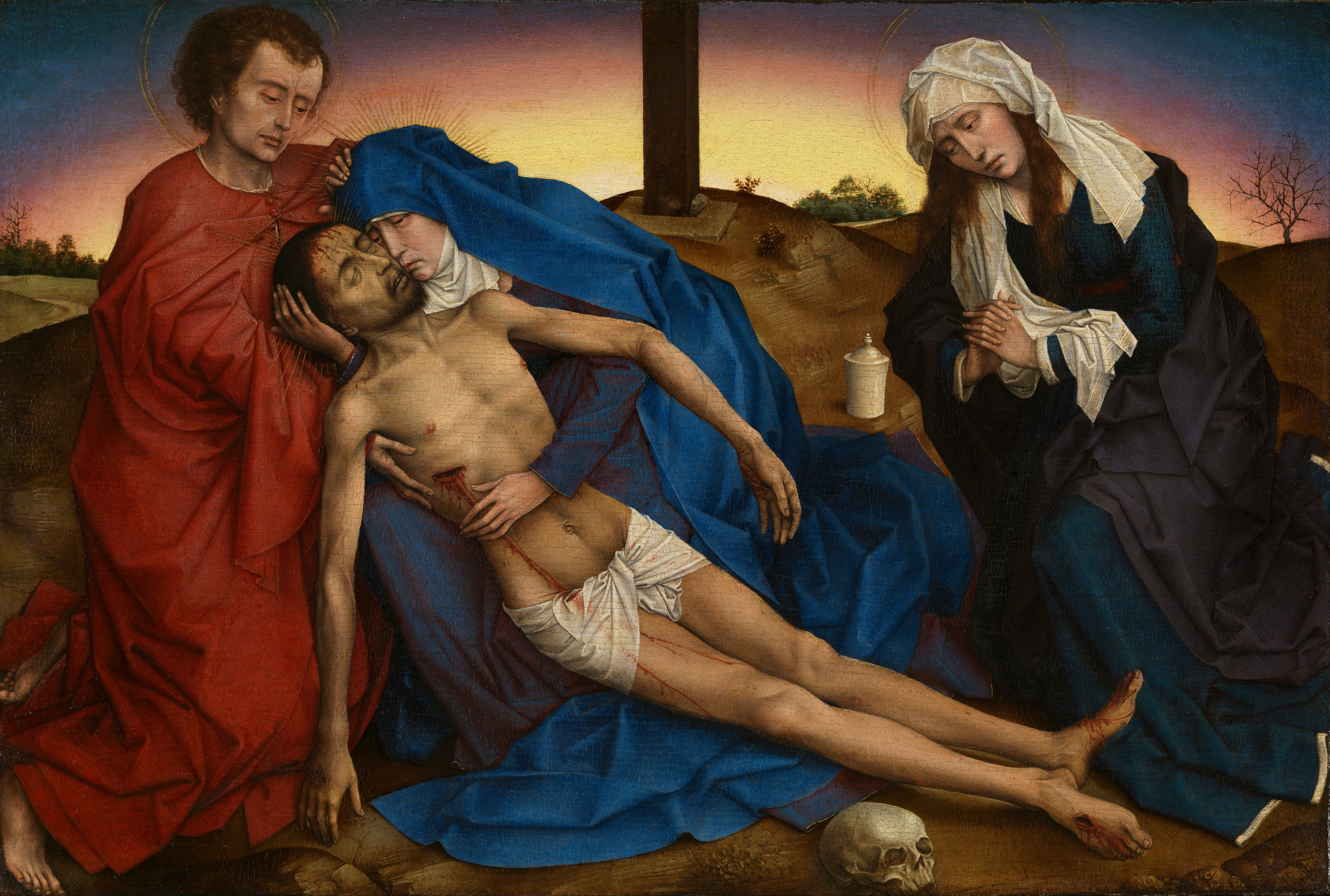
Rogier van der Weyden, Pietà, c 1441. Oil on oak panel, 32.5cm x 45.8cm. Royal Museums of Fine Arts of Belgium

Pietà is a painting by the Flemish artist Rogier van der Weyden dating from about 1441 held in the Royal Museums of Fine Arts of Belgium, Brussels. There are number of workshop versions and copies, notably in the National Gallery, London, in the Prado, Madrid, and in the Manzoni Collection, Naples. Infrared and X-radiograph evidence suggest that the Brussels version was painted by van der Weyden himself, not necessarily excluding the help of workshop assistants. Dendrochronological analysis gives a felling date of 1431 for the oak panel backing, supporting the dating of the painting to around 1441.

Campbell & van der Stock describe the painting as evincing a technical and aesthetic mastery in no way inferior to that of The Descent from the Cross, of comparable emotional force and controlled by an equally strongly balanced composition. Christ's dead body is conceived in a similarly natural way as in the Descent, the dangling arms and limp fingers typical of van der Weyden's acute observation. The conspicuous elongation of Christ's wrists has been explained away as the ineptness of an assistant, but equally it might be a consequence of Christ's hanging on the Cross, the kind of realistic detail characteristic of van der Weyden.

Although a fair number of imitations were made of the Brussels version, only a few were based directly on it. A direct connection can be seen only in the versions belonging to the Rademakers collection in The Hague, the Museum Mayer van den Bergh, Antwerp, and the Manzoni collection, Naples. The Manzoni version combines features from the Brussels version as well as those of the Madrid version and another in the Staatliche Museen, Berlin.

== Gallery ==
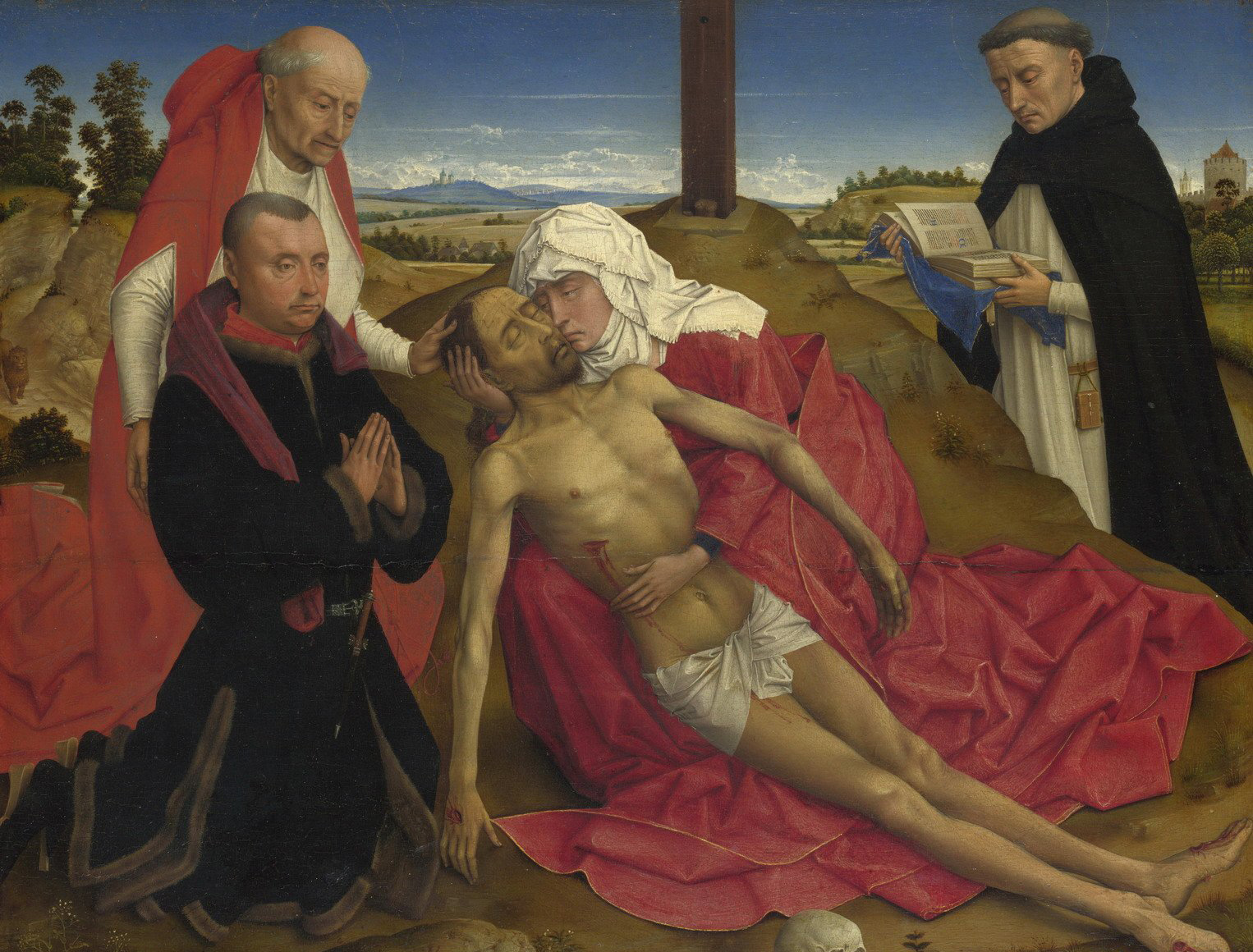
Pietà, National Gallery, London

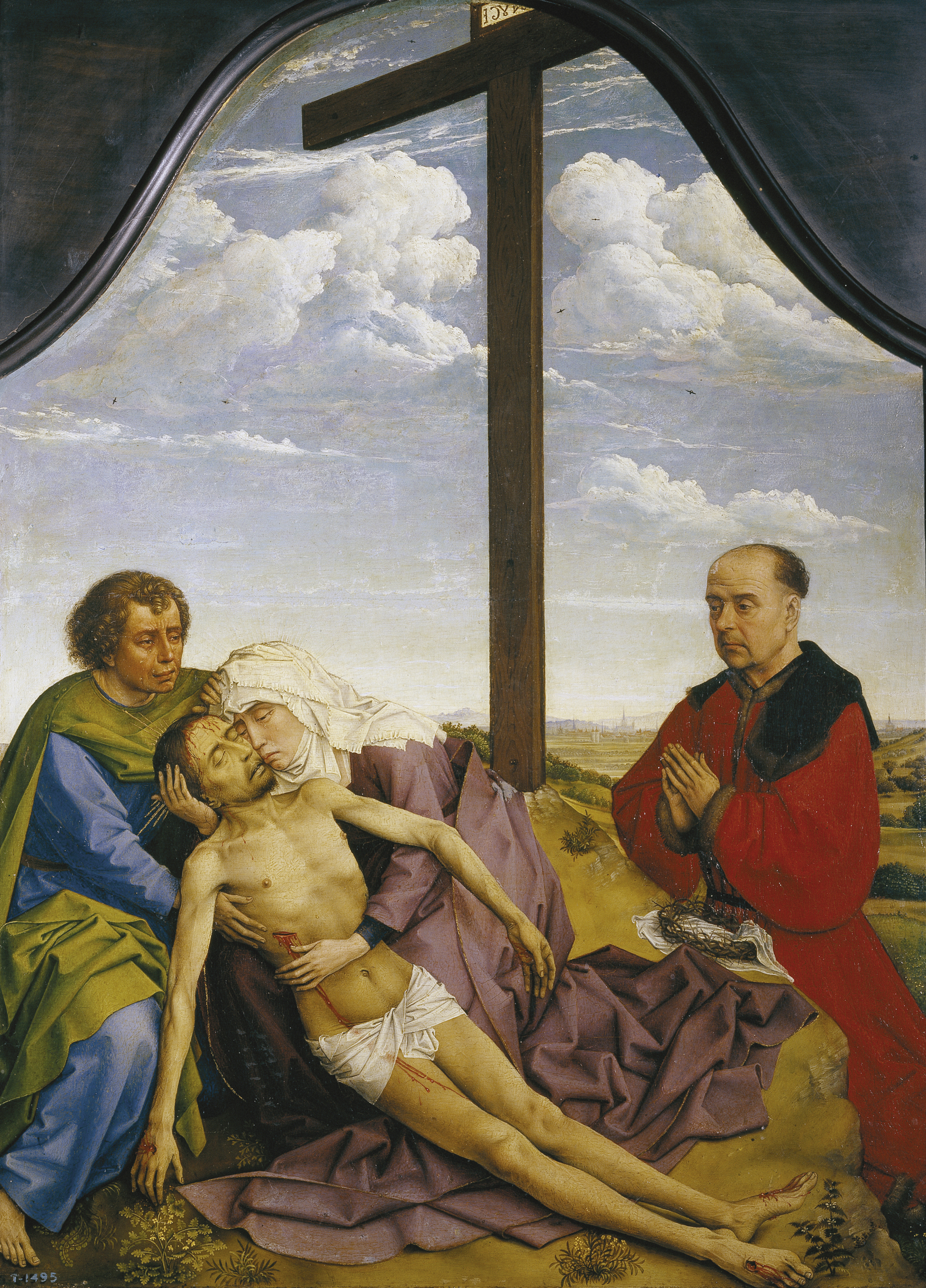
Pietà, Prado, Madrid

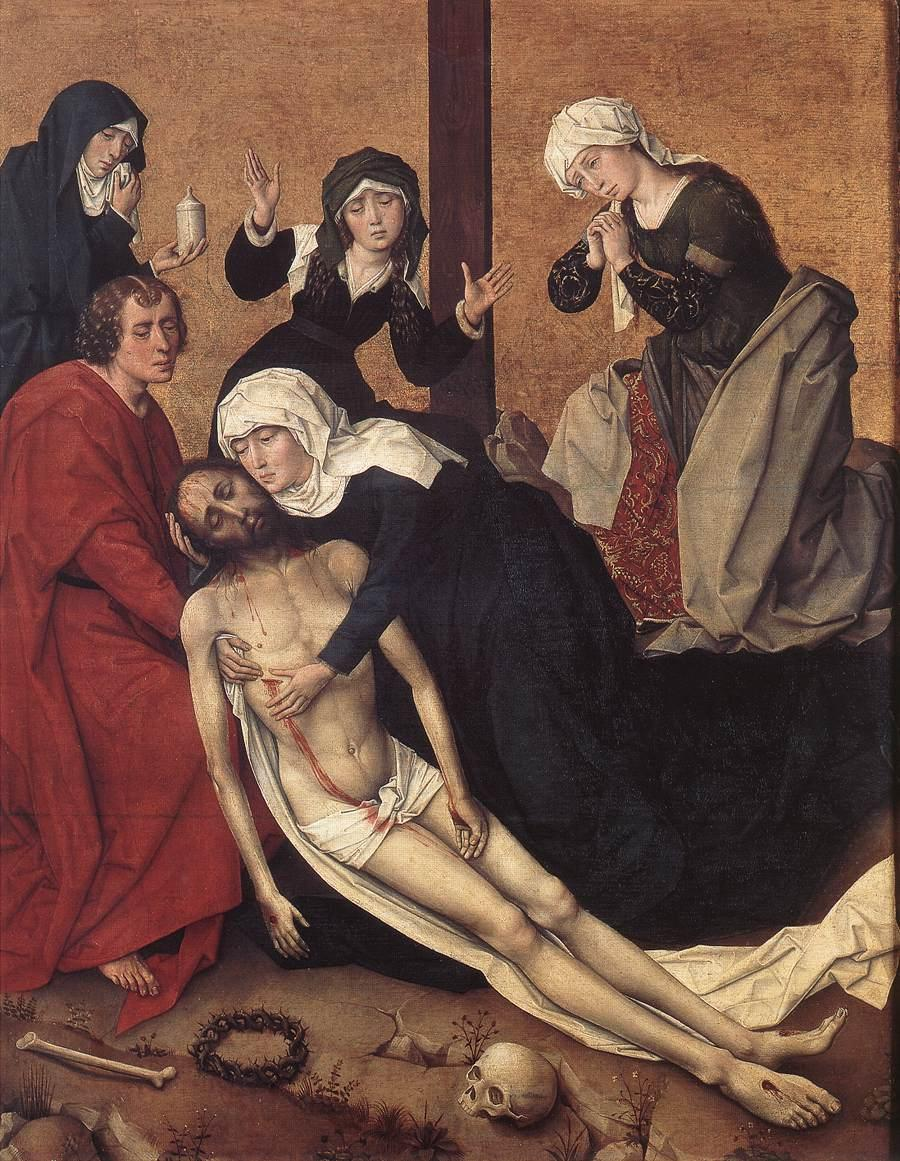
Vrancke van der Stockt, Bewening van Christus, circa 1455–1460

== See also ==
- List of works by Rogier van der Weyden

== Bibliography ==
- Campbell, Lorne. The Fifteenth Century Netherlandish Schools. London: National Gallery Publications, 1998. ISBN 1-85709-171-X
- Campbell, Lorne & Van der Stock, Jan. Rogier van der Weyden: 1400–1464. Master of Passions. Davidsfonds, Leuven, 2009. ISBN 978-90-8526-105-6
- Dijkstra, Jeltje, Originele en kopie. Een onderzoek naar de navolging van de Meester van Flémalle en Rogier van der Weyden, dissertation, Amsterdam, 1990
