= Fritz Mayer van den Bergh =

Belgian collector and historian (1858–1901)

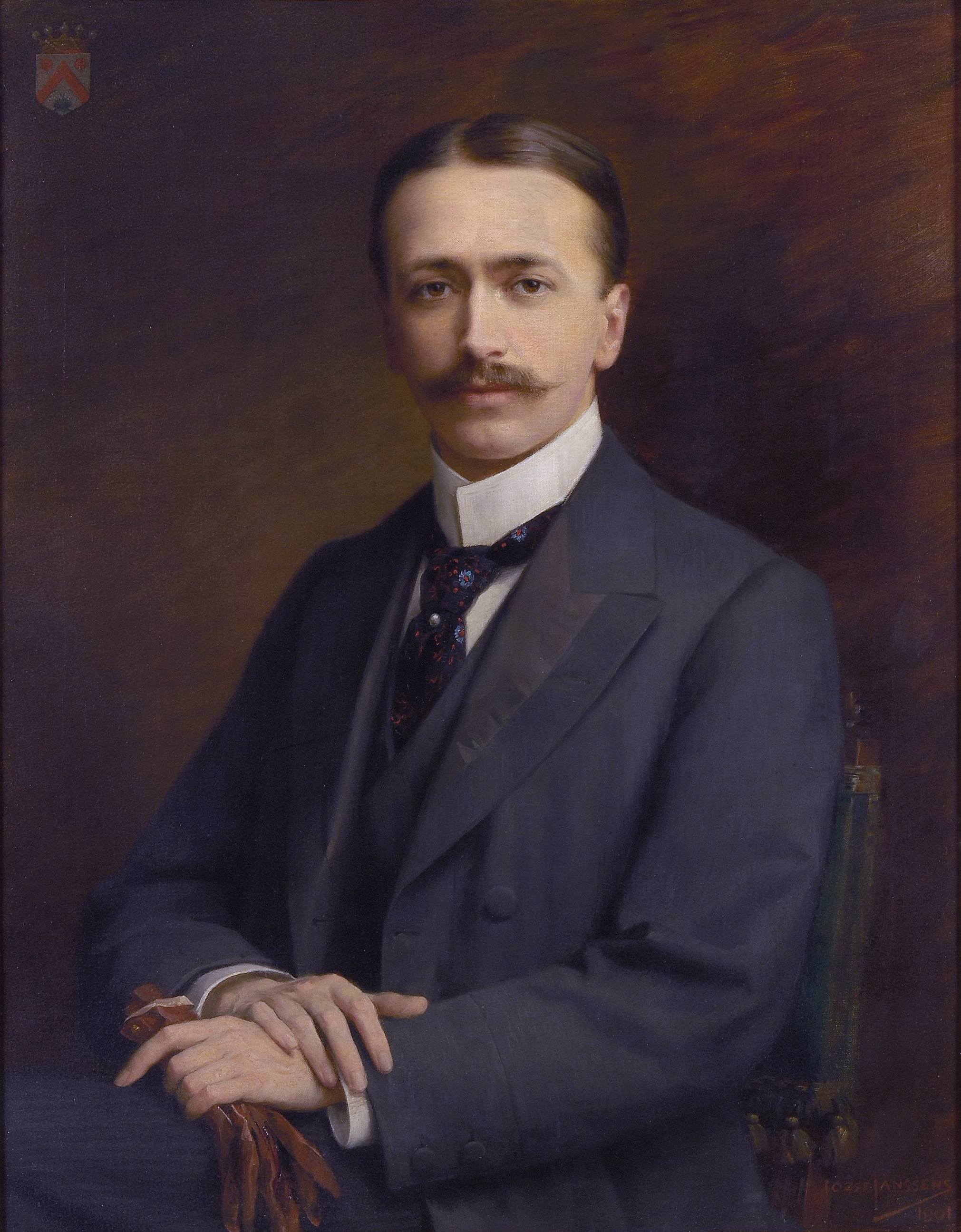
Ridder Mayer van den Bergh by Jozef Janssens de Varebeke

Frédéric Henri Godefroid Émile Constantin (Fritz) ridder Mayer van den Bergh (22 April 1858 – 4 May 1901) was a Belgian art collector and art historian.

== Life ==
Born in Antwerp, he was the eldest son of spice and drug trader Emil Mayer and his wife Henriëtte Isabelle Joanna (1838–1920). Wealthy like her husband (she was bequeathed five castles over the course of her life), Henriëtte was an art collector and daughter to the gin distiller Jean-Felix van den Bergh, who lived in kasteel Maxburg in Meer.

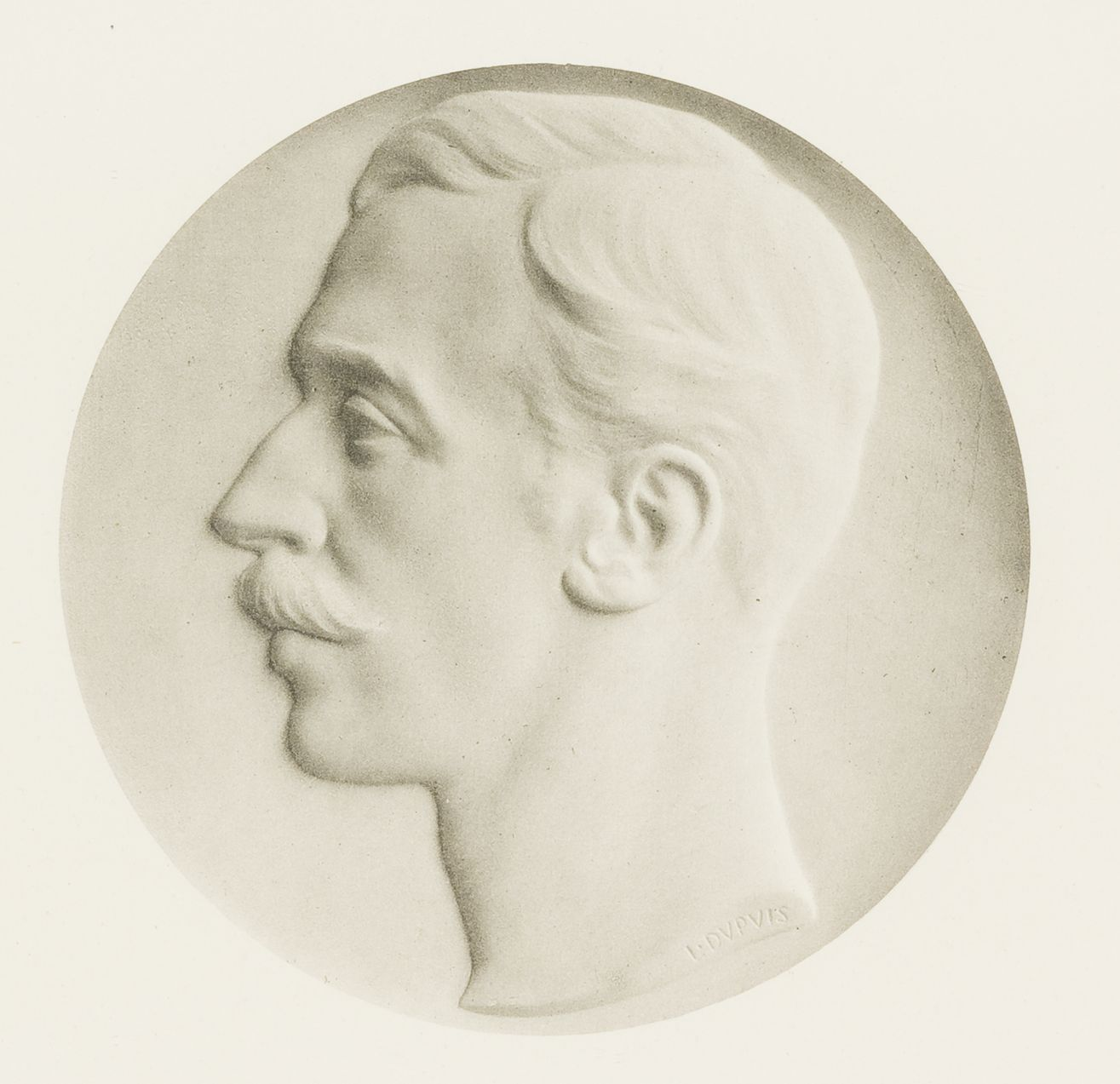
Portrait medallion of Mayer van den Bergh by Louis Dupuis

Frederik inherited millions of francs on his father's death, investing it in art, including many old master paintings and built up a renowned knowledge of art history, particularly Pieter Bruegel the Elder and Cornelis de Vos, owning five works by the latter artist. He was promoted to the Belgian hereditary nobility in 1888, with the inheritable title of "ridder" (knight), he died unmarried from a riding accident in Antwerp aged only 43.

His art collection was preserved but not completed as he had wished. He left it to his mother, who fulfilled his wishes and founded the Museum Mayer van den Bergh. His younger brother Oscar Jean Joseph Henri Émile Clément (Oscar) Mayer van den Bergh (22 March 1859, Antwerp - 8 August 1913, Edegem) published two catalogues of Fritz's collection - Oscar had married jkvr. Romaine du Bois d'Aische (1860-1944) in Edegem in 1887 and had two daughters with her, rising to the hereditary nobility himself in 1888.

A street was named Fredericusstraat after him in Mortsel in 1930, whilst "Van den Bergh" was posthumously added to his family name in 1933. The Mayerhof care centre succeeds the Sint-Frederikinstituut on the same site, the latter founded by Henriëtte in 1904.

== Museum Mayer van den Bergh ==
The art collection of Fritz Mayer van den Bergh is housed at the Museum Mayer van den Bergh. Shortly after Fritz's death, his mother, Henriëtte van den Bergh, established a museum as a tribute to her deceased son. Fritz's extensive collection has been on display since 1904.

In addition to paintings and sculptures, Fritz Mayer van den Bergh also collected applied arts. Henriëtte van den Bergh included these pieces whilst designing the museum. The interior reflects the collector's taste in art and gives the museum a home-like feel. Fritz Mayer van den Bergh studied the works he purchased, and he could rely on an extensive network of contacts in the art world. Dulle Griet (also known as Mad Meg), a painting by Pieter Bruegel the Elder is part of the Mayer van den Bergh collection. Fritz was able to acquire this masterpiece thanks to an acquaintance who writes him about an auction in Cologne. He bought the piece for 488 Belgian francs.

Thanks to Henriëtte van den Bergh's vision, both the museum building and Fritz's collection have been preserved. She created a council of regents, consisting of friends and art experts, and drew up a will stating that the collection must remain exactly as Fritz Mayer van den Bergh collected it.

== Bibliography ==
- (in French) Collections du Chevalier Mayer van den Bergh. Catalogue des tableaux exposées dans les galeries de la Maison des Rois Mages. Anvers, 1904.
- (in French) Oscar Mayer van den Bergh, Collections du chevalier Mayer van den Bergh. Catalogue des jetons, médailles, méreaux et monnaies exposés dans les galeries de la Maison des Rois Mages, à Anvers. Anvers, [1911].
- (in French) Oscar Mayer van den Bergh, Collections du chevalier Mayer van den Bergh. Catalogue des volumes formant la Bibliothèque de la Maison des Rois Mages, Rue de l'Hôpital, 19, Anvers. [Z.p.], 1920.
- (in Dutch) Jozef De Coo, Fritz Mayer van den Bergh: De verzamelaar, de verzameling. Schoten, C. Govaerts, 1979.
- (in Dutch) H. NIEUWDORP & I. KOEKELBERGH, Het Museum Mayer van de Bergh, Collectie Musea Nostra, Brussel, 1992.
- (in French) Oscar COOMANS DE BRACHÈNE, État présent de la noblesse belge, Annuaire 1993, Brusse, 1993.
