= Vrancke van der Stockt =

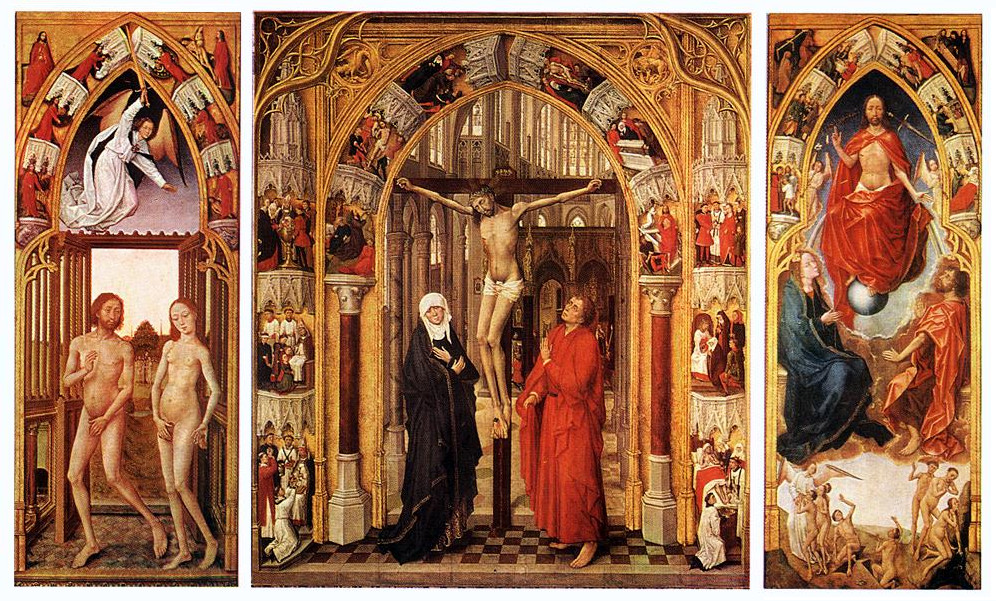
Redemption Triptych (c. 1455-59), oil on wood, 195 cm (76.8 in) x 326 cm (128.3 in). Collection Museo del Prado, Madrid

Vrancke van der Stockt (before 1420 - 14 June 1495) was an early Netherlandish painter. He is most notable as a "direct heir and popularizer" of Rogier van der Weyden.

== Life ==
In 1445 Vrancke van der Stockt became a master in the Brussels Guild of St. Luke and inherited the workshop of his father, Jan van der Stockt, who had recently died. He obtained considerable recognition for his work, becoming the town's official painter after the death of Rogier van der Weyden in 1464. He was also served as town councilor in 1465, 1472, and 1475 and as head of the Confraternity of St. Eloy between 1471 and 1473.

With his wife Catherine de Moeyen he had two sons, Bernaert van der Stockt (before 1469 - after 1538) and Michiel van der Stockt (before 1469 - ?), who were both painters.

== Work ==
Van der Stockt's work was heavily influenced by Rogier van der Weyden, with whom he may have collaborated. Compared to Weyden, his work is "more gently drawn". Although his figures have "slender, elegant, and mannered silhouettes," he was "unable to endow them with the same elegant movement and profound drama of his master's figures." He would often reproduce motifs from paintings by Van der Weyden with only minor alterations, as is evidenced by Kneeling Donor with Saint John the Baptist, now in the collection of the Allen Memorial Art Museum, in which the figure of the saint closely resembles that in Van der Weyden's Medici Madonna. His Pietà is likewise modelled on van der Weyden's Pietà.

Although he was primarily a painter, Van der Stockt also completed cartoons for embroideries and tapestries and designs for woodcuts.

None of Van der Stockt's works are documented; rather, they have been attributed to him based on their stylistic relationship to the Redemption triptych, now in the collection of the Museo del Prado in Madrid. The Redemption triptych itself was not attributed to Van der Stockt until the 1920s.

== Gallery ==
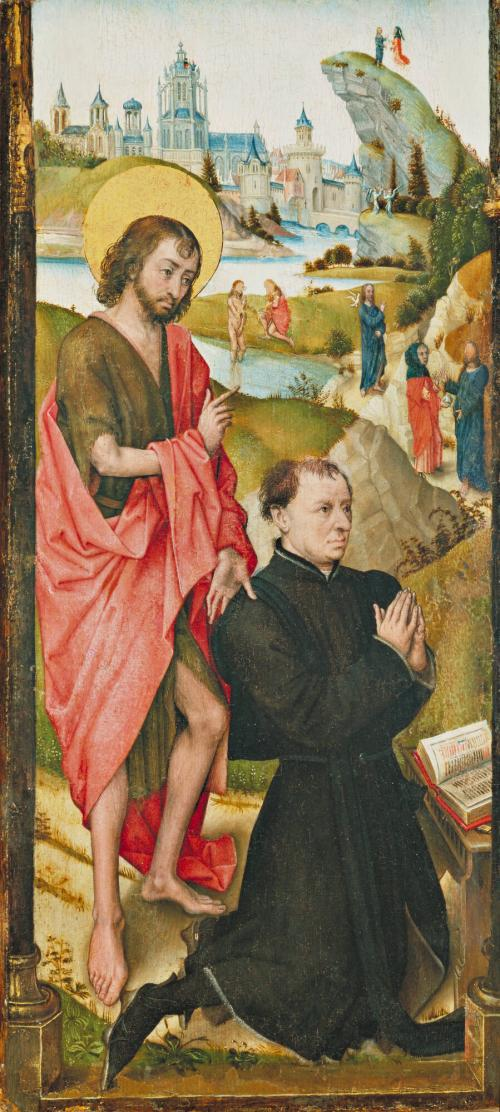
Kneeling Donor with Saint John the Baptist (c. 1470). Note the position of the Saint's feet compared to those in Van der Weyden's Medici Madonna. Van der Stockt has transposed them, unaltered, from steps to a grassy incline, resulting in a relatively awkward pose.

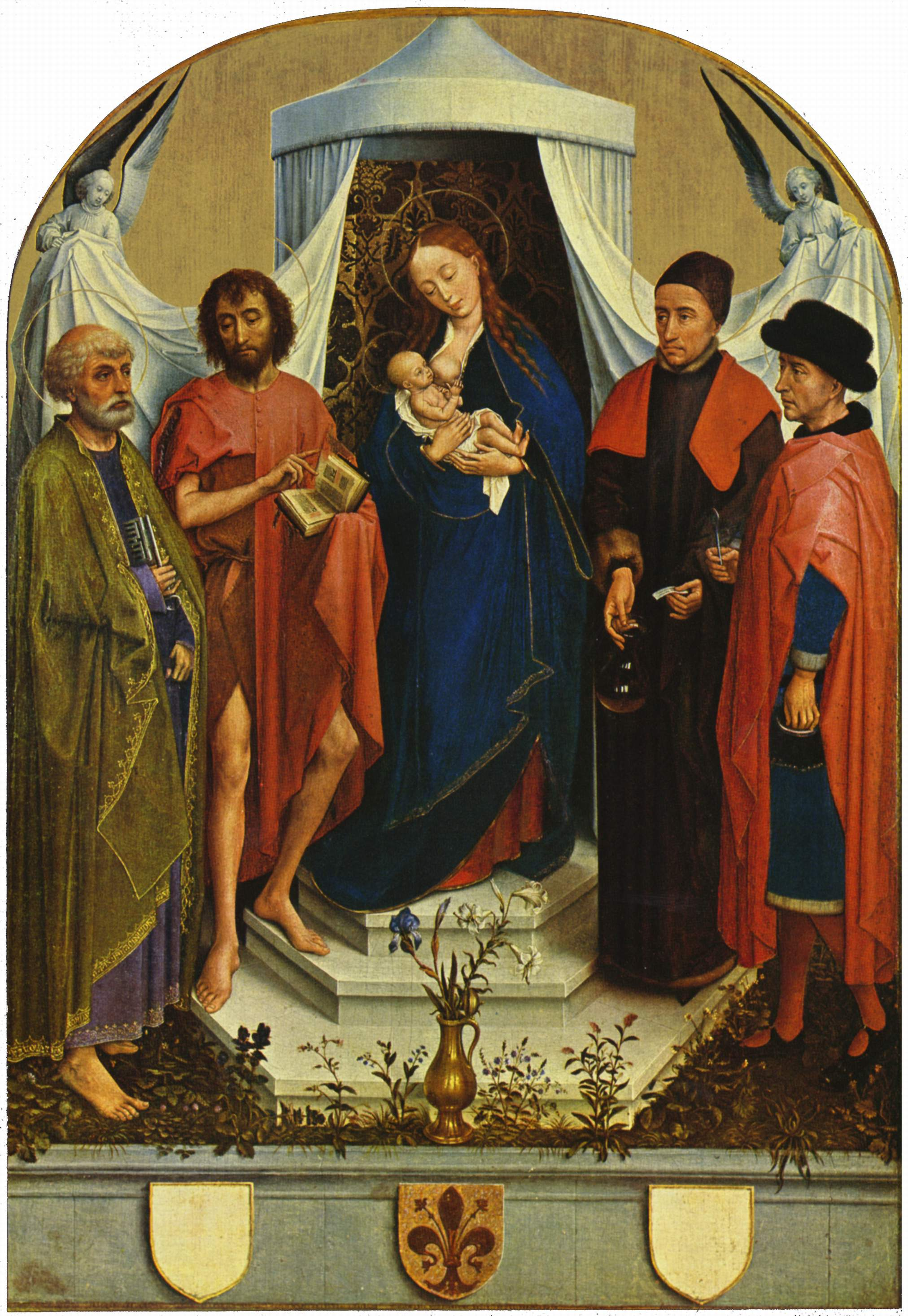
Rogier van der Weyden, Medici Madonna (c. 1450).

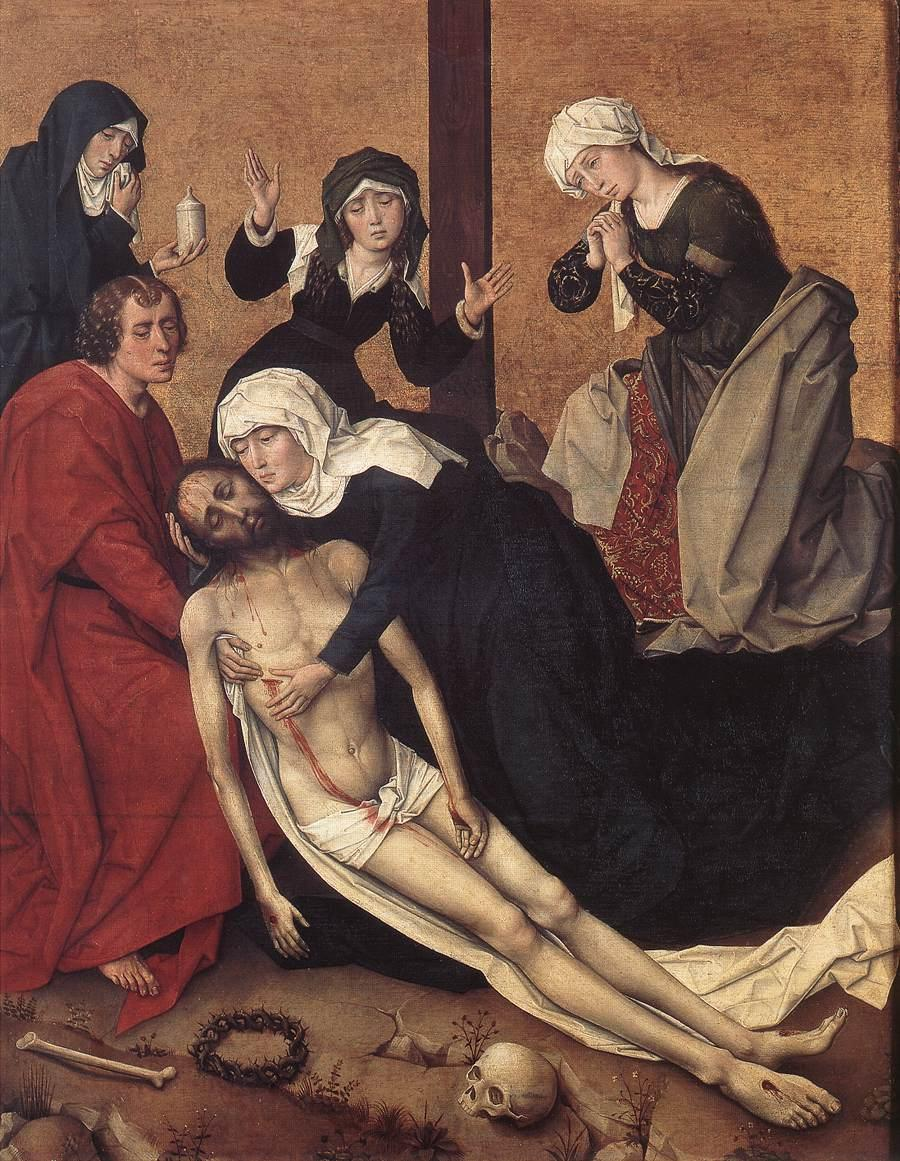
Pietà (c. 1455-59), now in the Museum Mayer van den Bergh

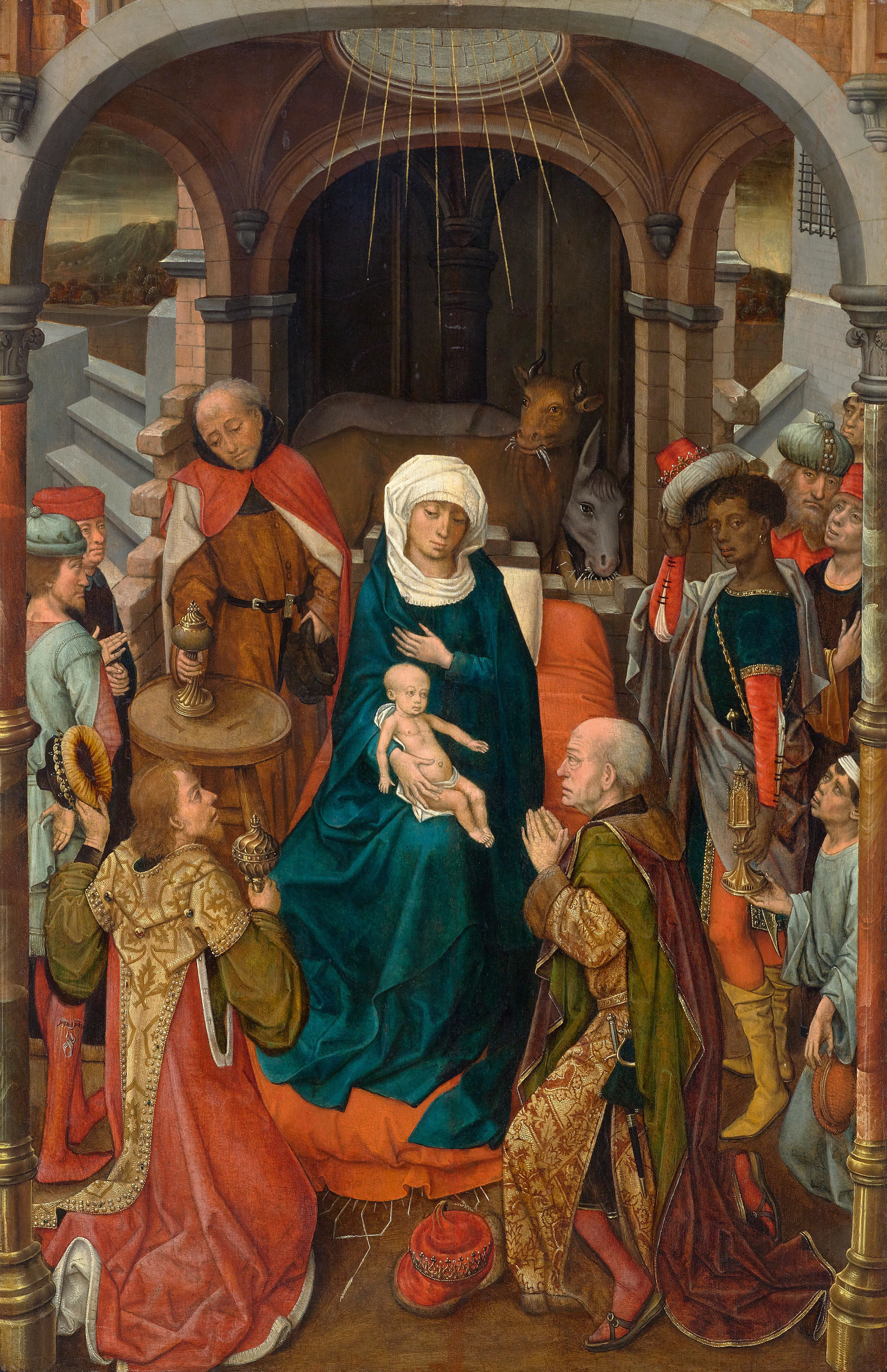
The Adoration of the Magi

== Bibliography ==
- Campbell, Lorne & Van der Stock, Jan. Rogier van der Weyden: 1400–1464. Master of Passions. Davidsfonds, Leuven, 2009. ISBN 978-90-8526-105-6
