= Henriette Mayer van den Bergh =

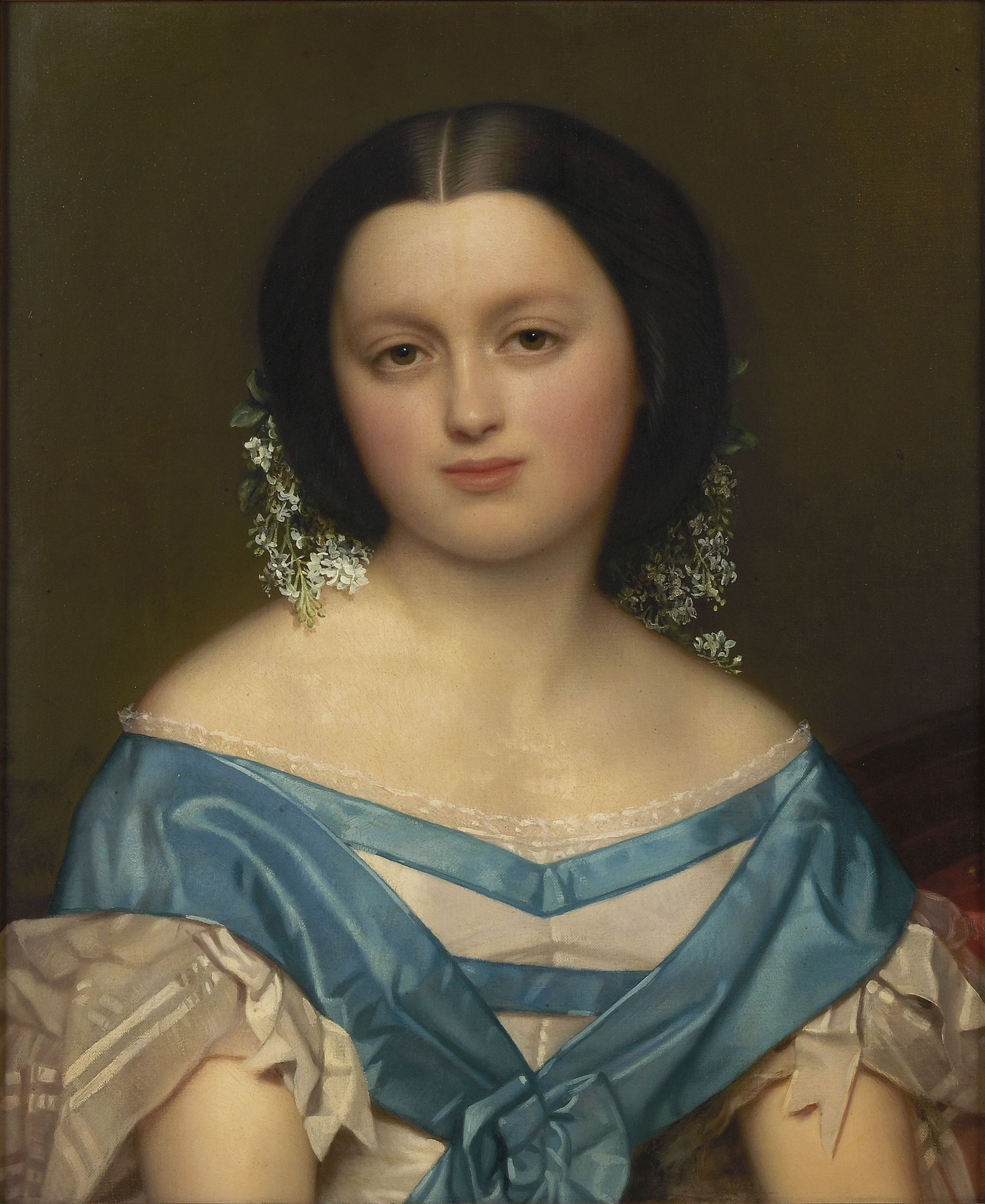
- Wedding portrait of Henriette van den Bergh, aged 19, by Joseph van Lerius
- Born: 9 July 1838
- Died: 27 March 1920 (aged 81); Antwerp

Henriëtte Mayer-van den Bergh (9 July 1838 – 27 March 1920) was a Belgian museum founder, known for commissioning the building and establishing Museum Mayer van den Bergh, which she curated until her death.

She was the daughter of the Antwerp senator Jean Félix Van den Bergh who ran the “La Cloche” brewery with his brother Maximilien. Henriette married the Cologne businessman Emil Mayer in 1857, who had moved to Antwerp to open a franchise for his family's pharmacy and spice business. The Mayer-Van den Berghs purchased the 'Hof van Arenberg' on the corner of Lange Gasthuisstraat and Arenbergstraat in 1861 and renovated it to suit their taste. They had two sons, Fritz and Oscar. After the death of her husband Emil in 1879, Henriette withdrew from society but turned to the study of art. Her eldest son Fritz broke off his studies to move back in with her and Oscar took over the family business. In 1887 Fritz took her name, and in 1888 both sons were granted noble titles. Fritz became thereafter known in the art world as 'Chev. Mayer-van den Bergh'.

== Founding a museum ==
During the years her husband was alive, Henriette was probably already active as a collector, as the archives of her museum have provenance notes by her son Fritz indicating "Maman" for works purchased by her. After her son returned to live with her, he first spent time on his own numismatic collection and then turned his attention to cataloguing the family's art. In 1892, mother and son sold a large part of their collection, presumably to enable Fritz to make serious acquisitions with an eye for founding a museum. During the next nine years he became a dealer in his own right, making sales and purchases to augment his growing collection. After his untimely death, Henriette fulfilled his dream, hiring the architect Joseph Hertogs to build an adjacent building in Gothic style, and hiring advisors to help her oversee her son's estate, while securing his papers regarding the core collection that was destined for the museum. She curated the museum herself until she died, leaving a legacy that has survived to the present day.
