= Museum Mayer van den Bergh =

Museum in Antwerp, Belgium

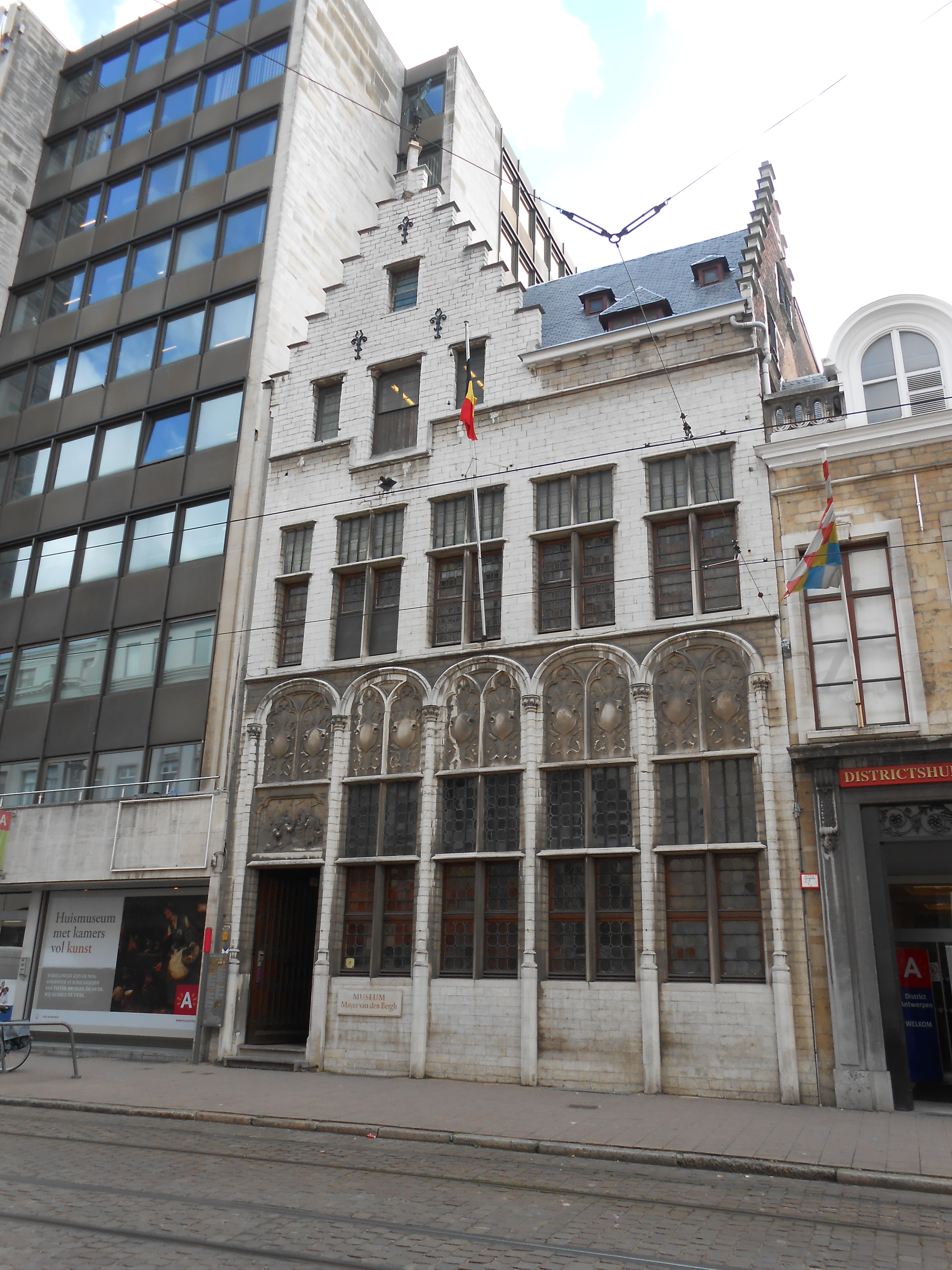
- Location: Lange Gasthuisstraat 19; Antwerp, Belgium
- Coordinates: 51°12′54″N 4°24′18″E
- Website: museummayervandenbergh.be/en/

Museum Mayer van den Bergh is a museum in Antwerp, Belgium, the collection of which is based on the vast collection of the art dealer and collector Fritz Mayer van den Bergh (1858–1901). The majority of the art works and objects are from the Gothic and Renaissance periods in Belgium, including paintings by Pieter Brueghel the Elder.

== History ==
Fritz Mayer van den Bergh was born in 1858 in Antwerp. He was the eldest son of Henriëtte Van den Bergh, who was from an influential Antwerp family, and Emil Mayer, a businessman from Cologne. The family lived in a spacious city palace in the heart of Antwerp, remodelled from an older building. His father already owned an art collection which included works by Jan Brueghel the Elder.

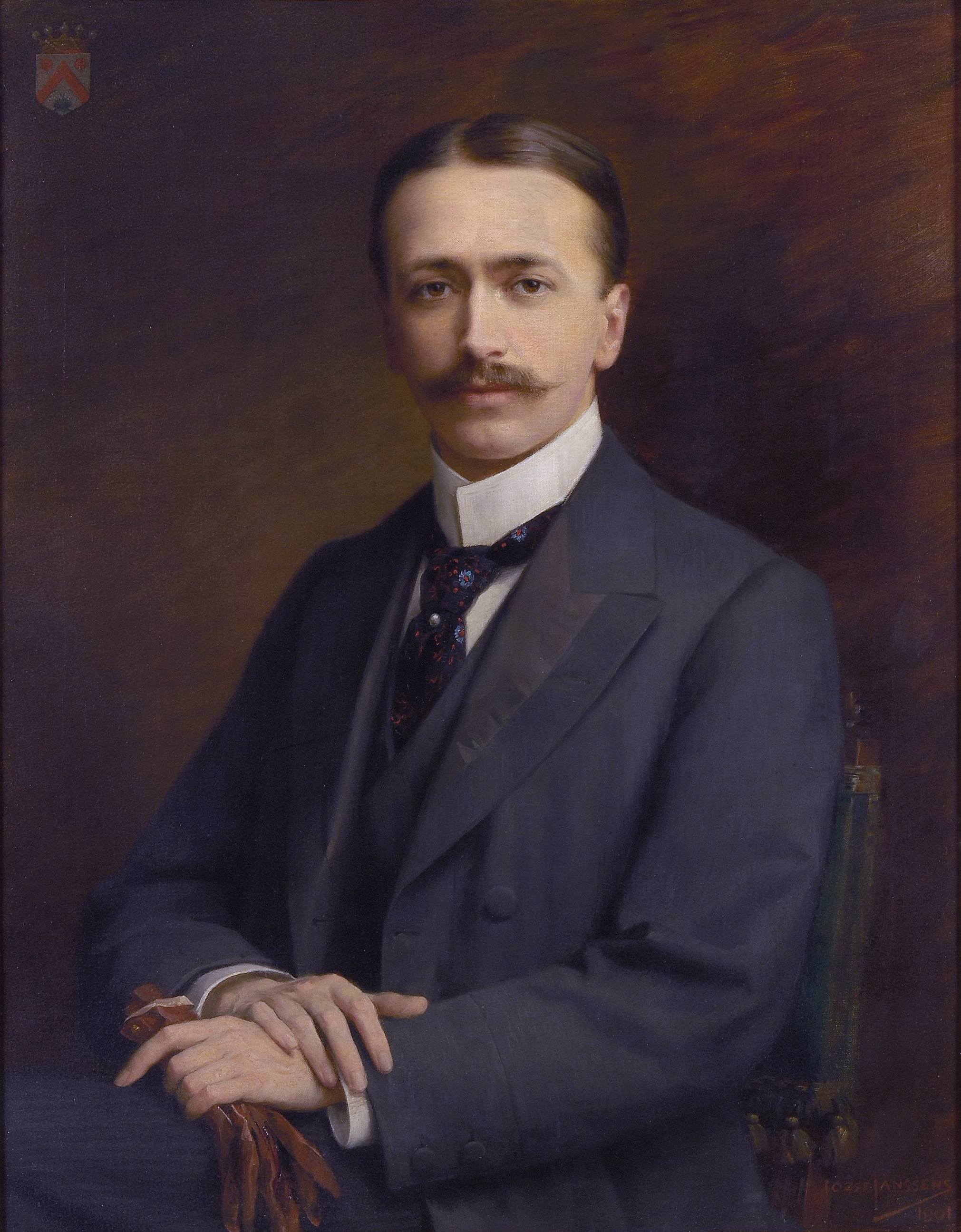
Portrait of Fritz Mayer van den Bergh by Jozef Janssens, 1901

Fritz collected art for most of his life, making his most expensive and important additions between 1897 and his death at the age of 43 in 1901. He was especially interested in art from the 14th to sixteenth century. At the time, Gothic and Renaissance art was not particularly appreciated and affordable. This allowed him to build a collection of 1.000 pieces of mostly Northern Renaissance art. In his childhood, Fritz collected coins. This interest stayed with him as coins and tokens make up a considerable part of his art collection.

The art collector was often the first to purchase widely wanted pieces. His knowledge and passion for art allowed him to make fast and well-made decisions. Mad Meg by Bruegel, that he bought for 488 Belgian Francs is a prime example. The painting was thought to be lost before Fritz bought and discovered it anew.

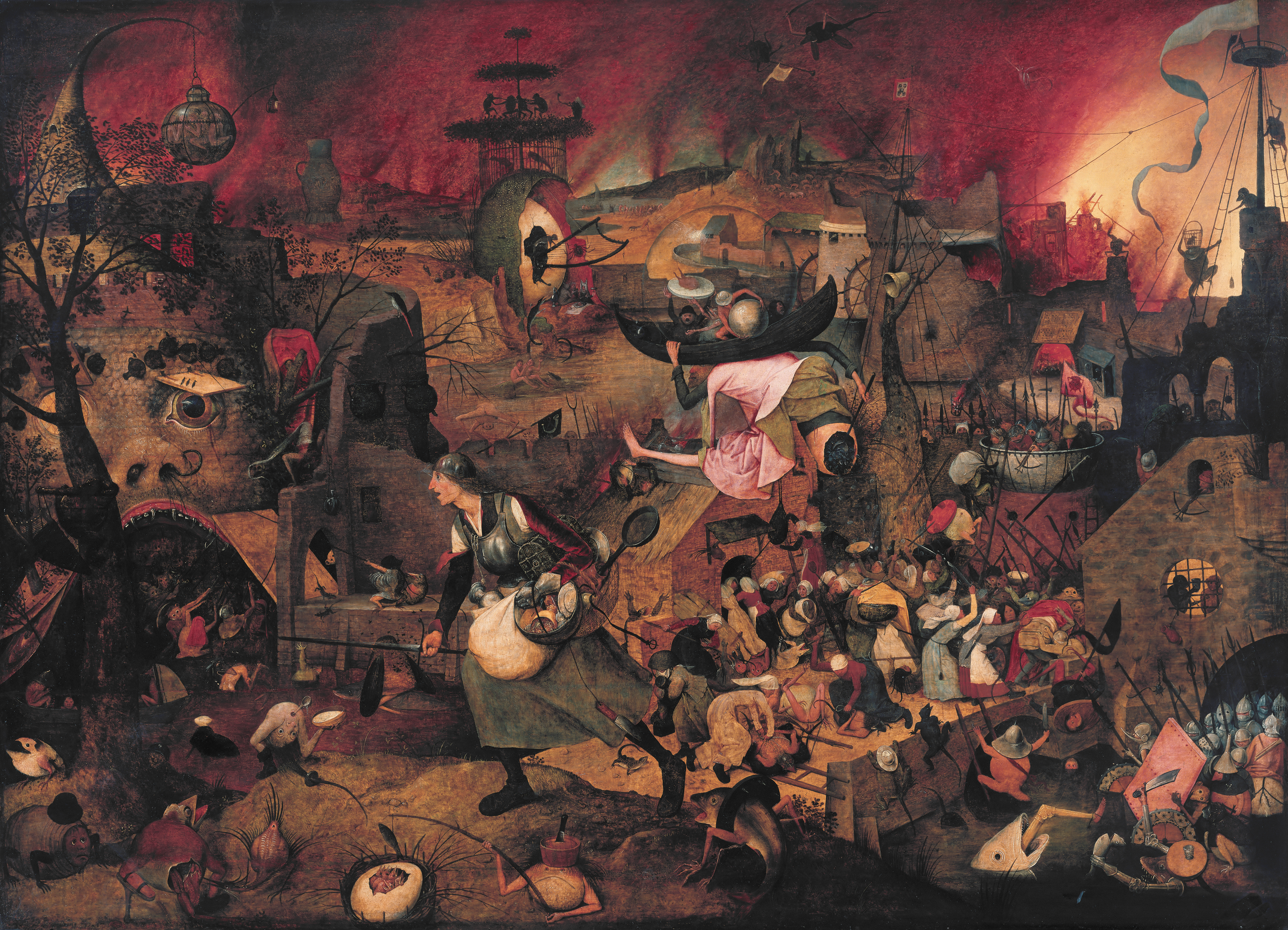
Mad Meg by Pieter Brueghel the Elder, one of the museum's masterpieces.

== The Museum ==
After his death, his mother Henriëtte Mayer van den Bergh built a museum in his honour. Between 1901 and 1904 in the banking district of Antwerp she built a neo-Gothic building to serve as a museum for the expansive art collection of her son. To secure the future of the collection and the museum, Henriette van den Bergh assembled a Board of Regents and composed a will that said the collection should always remain as Fritz Mayer van den Bergh had collected it; nothing can be removed or added. Thus, preserving the collection, the way he once accumulated it.

Henriëtte van den Bergh continued to play an active role within the museum after she founded it. She gave visitors private tours which were described as intimate and home-like. Fritz also collected applied arts, which were incorporated into the museum interior.

The City of Antwerp and a Board of Regents have jointly managed the building and collection since 1951. The museum undergoes renovation starting from 2025. Works to expand the premises of the museum include adding the adjacent corner house - once the childhood home of Fritz Mayer van den Bergh - and a new building.

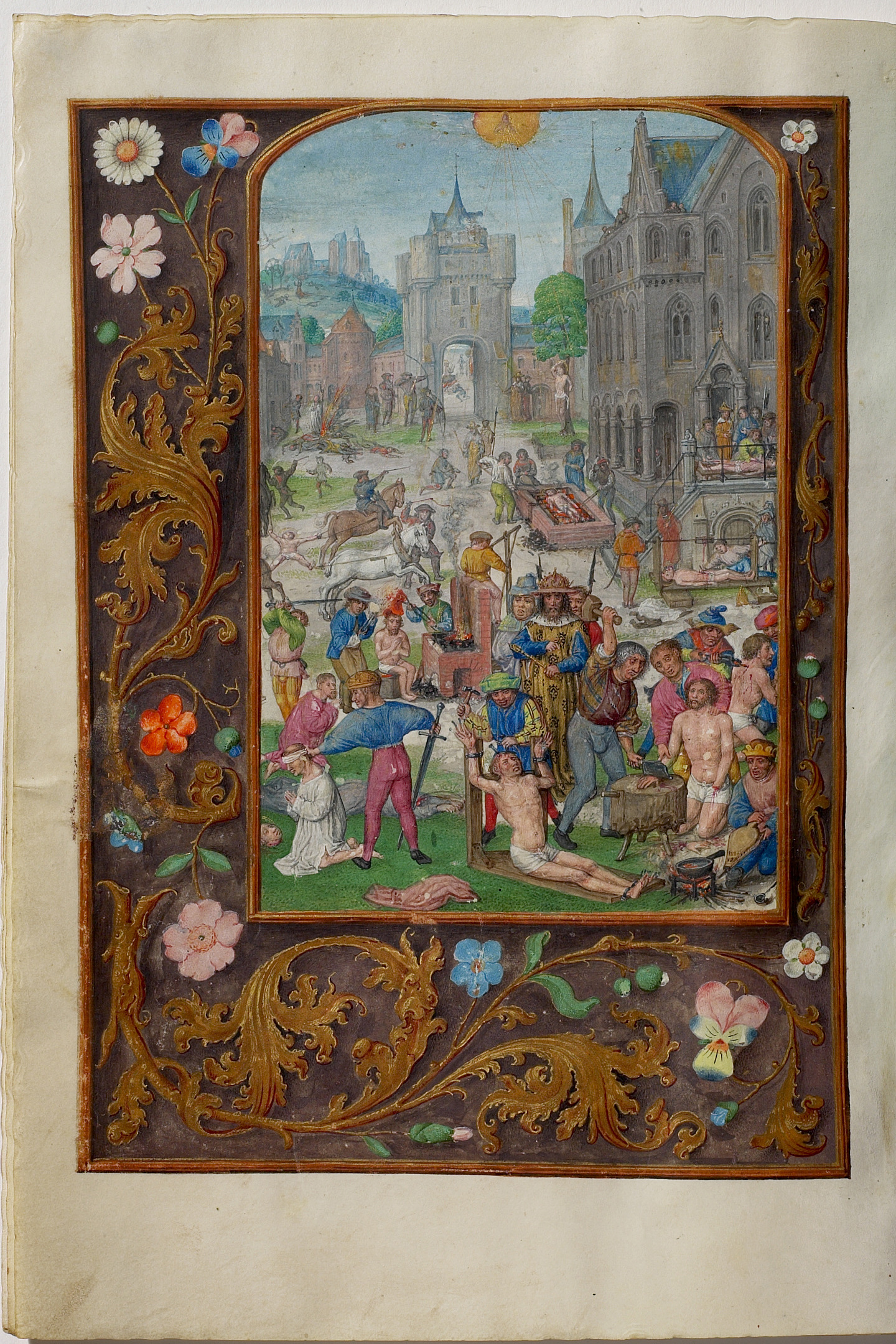
Page from the Mayer van den Bergh Breviary depicting the martyrdom of various saints

== Collection highlights ==
- The Mayer van den Bergh Breviary, a late 15th-century or early 16th-century illustrated manuscript of 1412 pages, probably made for a rich Portuguese based in Antwerp. Various known and anonymous artists contributed the art to the manuscript including Gerard David, Simon Bening, the Master of James IV of Scotland, the Master of the First Prayer Book of Maximilian, Gerard Horenbout and Jan Provost.
- Pieter Brueghel the Elder, Dulle Griet (Mad Meg or Dull Gret), ca. 1562
- Pieter Brueghel the Elder, Proverbs
- Master Heinrich of Constance, Christ and Saint John Group, 14th century
- Pieter Huys, The Temptation of Saint Anthony, 1577
- Jan Mabuse, Magdalen
- Quentin Matsys, Crucifixion
- A pleurant, 15th century.
- Angelo di Puccinelli, Saints Sebastian and Saint Leonard, 14th century
- Ambrosius Benson, Saint Jerome

== Gallery ==
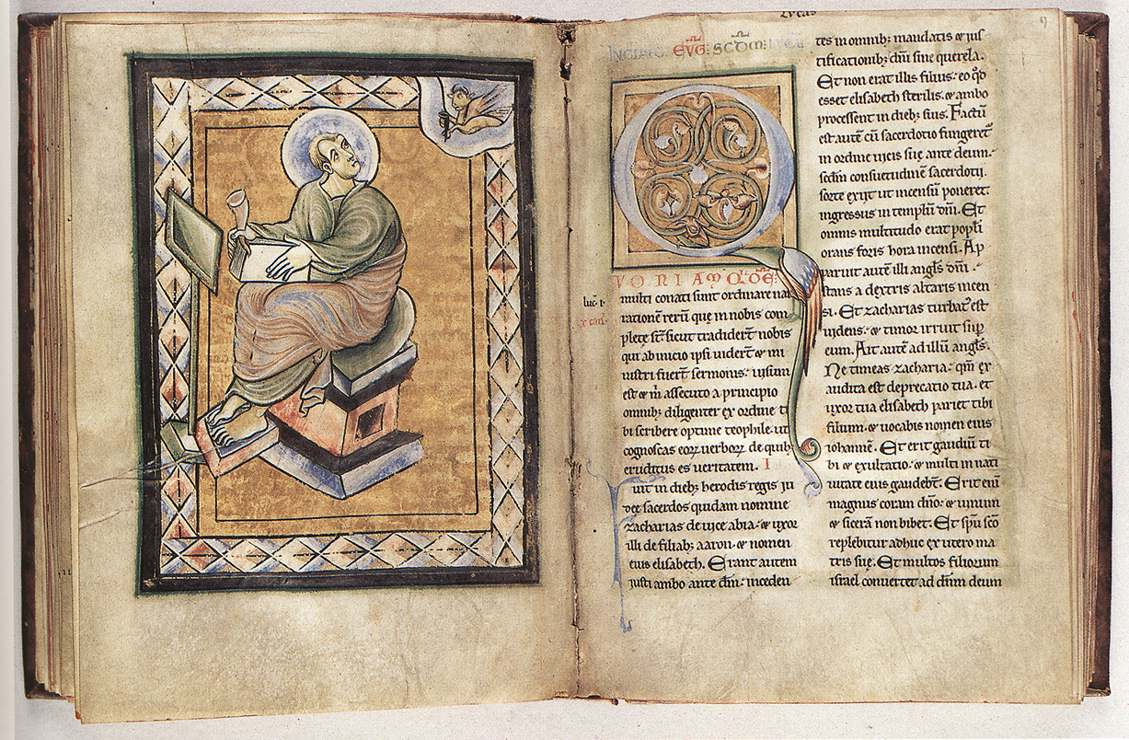
Illumination from the 12th century Evangeliary from Saint-Amand Abbey

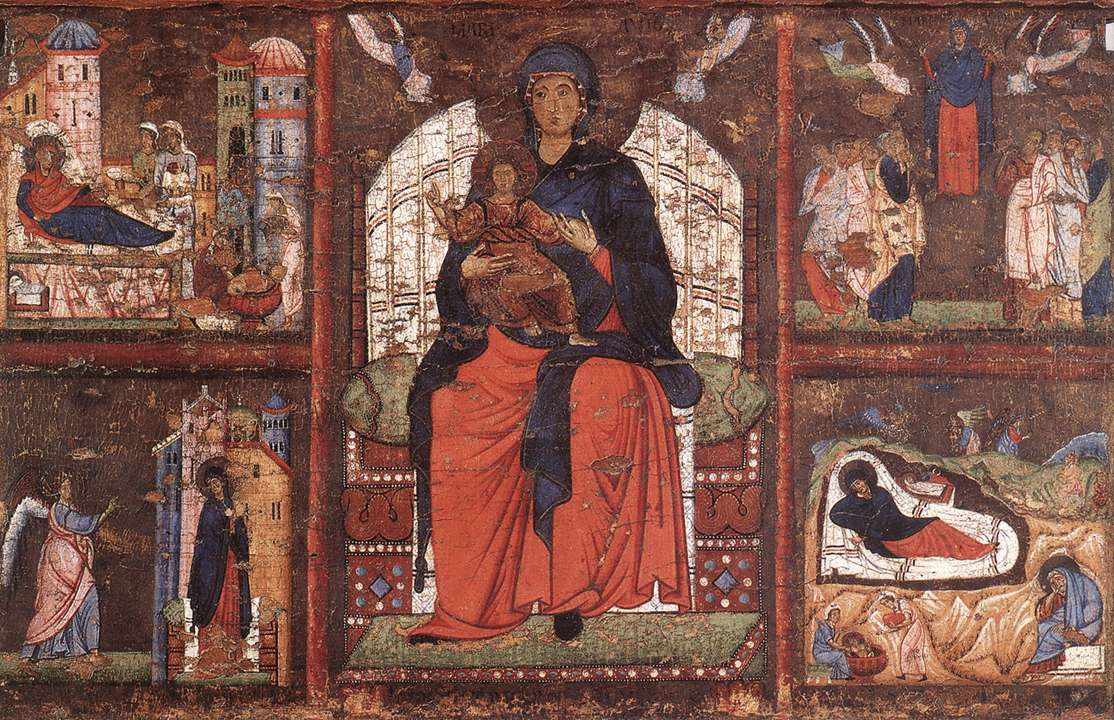
Virgin and Child Enthroned with Scenes from the Life of the Virgin (unknown master, Italian active in the 1270s)

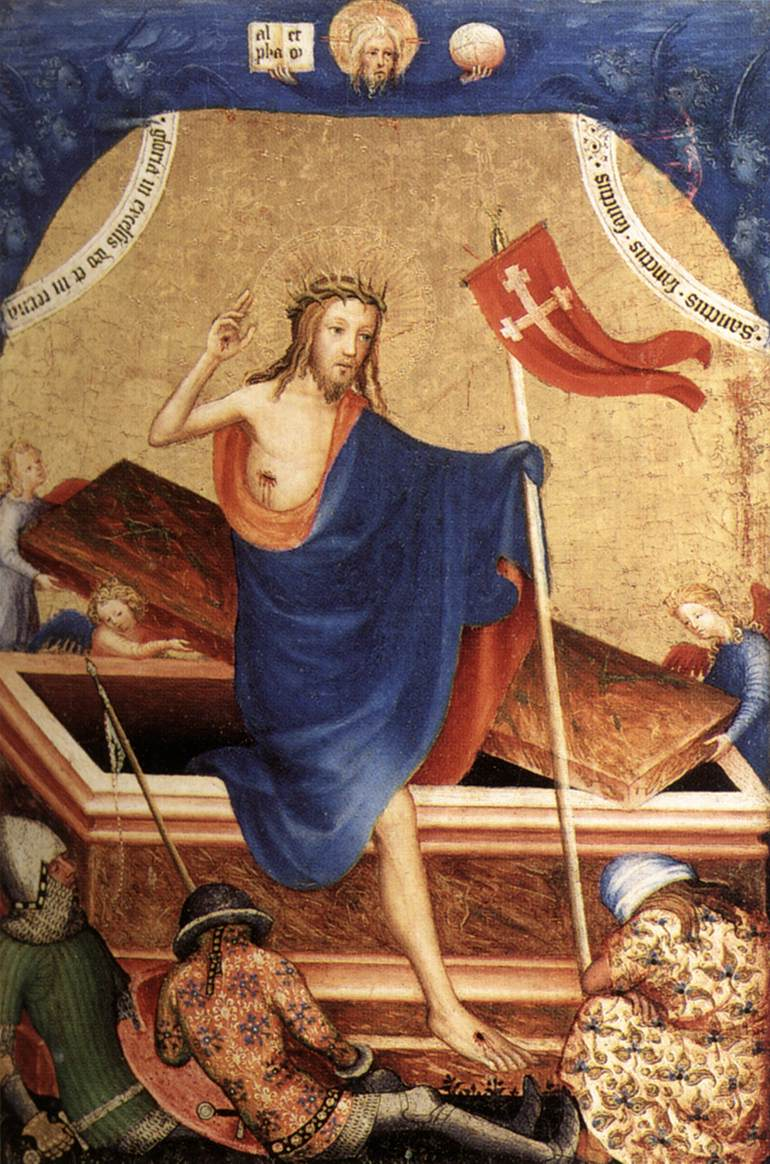
Resurrection from the Antwerp-Baltimore Quadriptych, ca. 1380

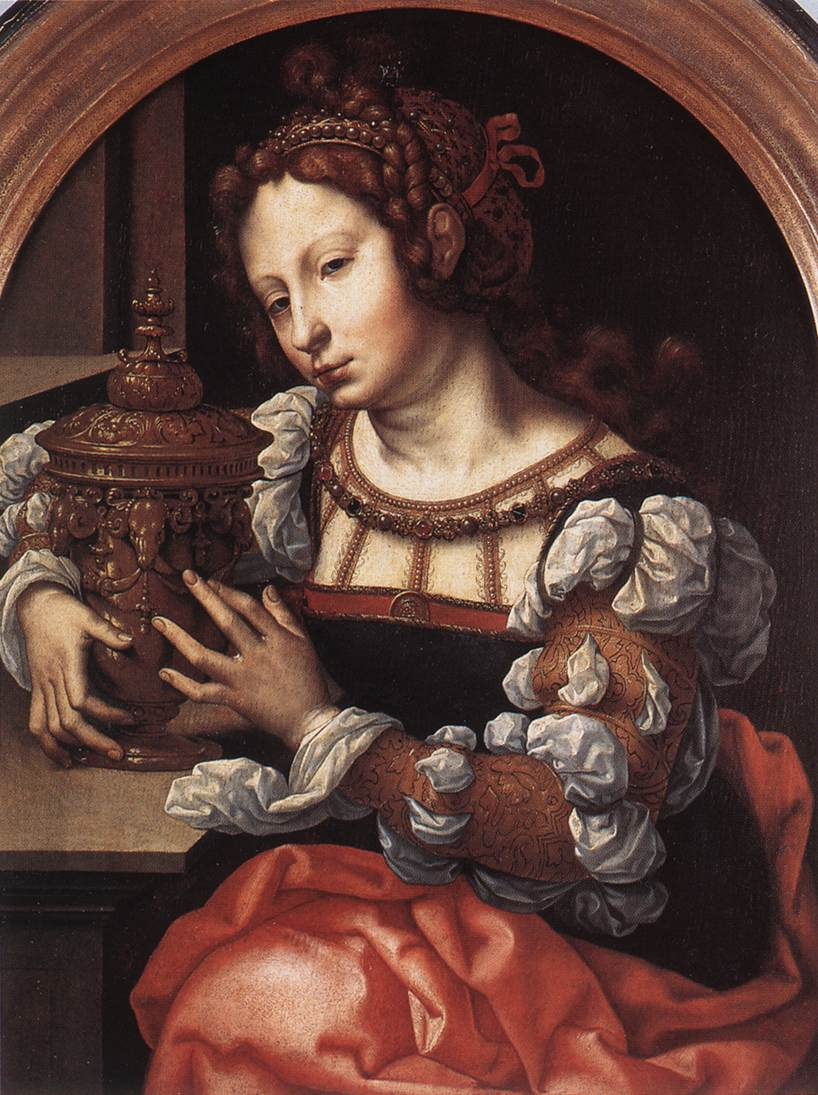
Lady Portrayed as Mary Magdalene by Jan Gossaert dit Mabuse

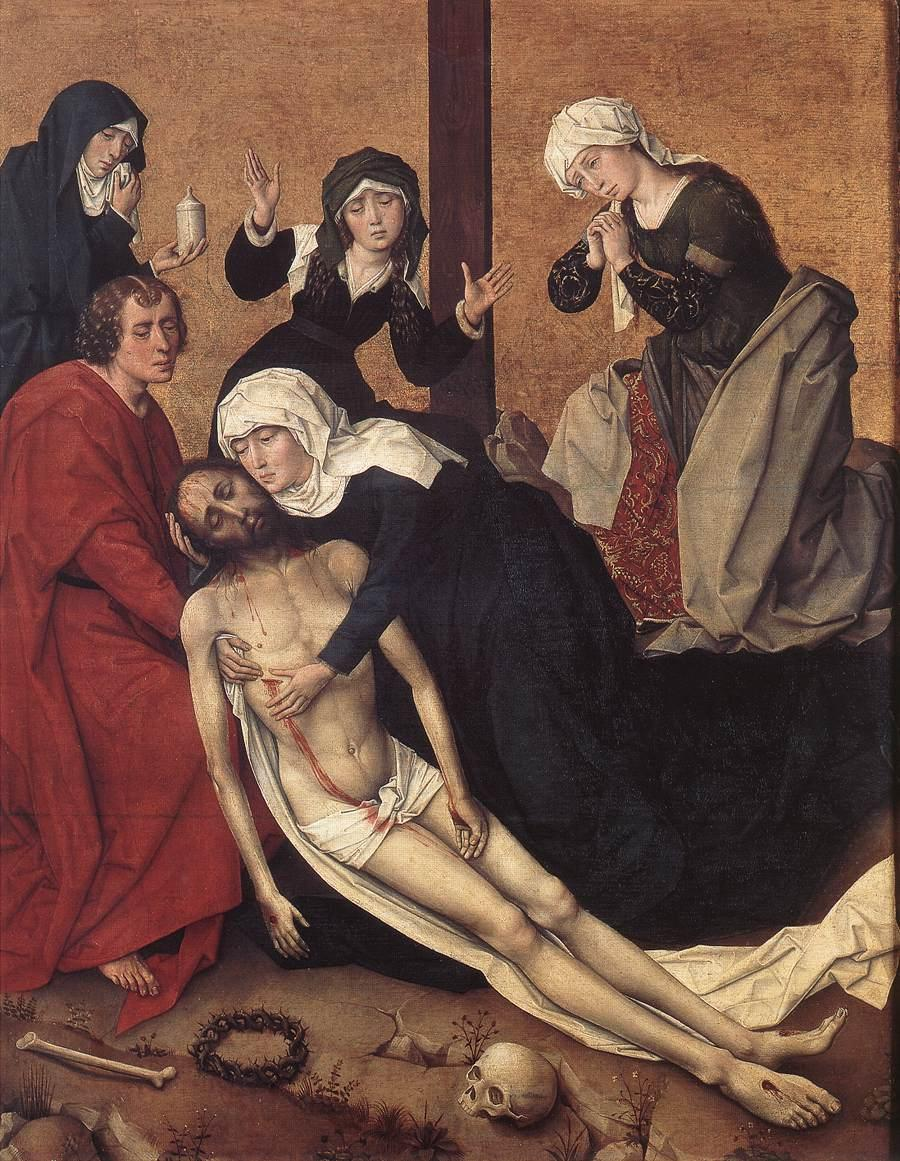
Pietà by Vrancke van der Stockt, 15th century

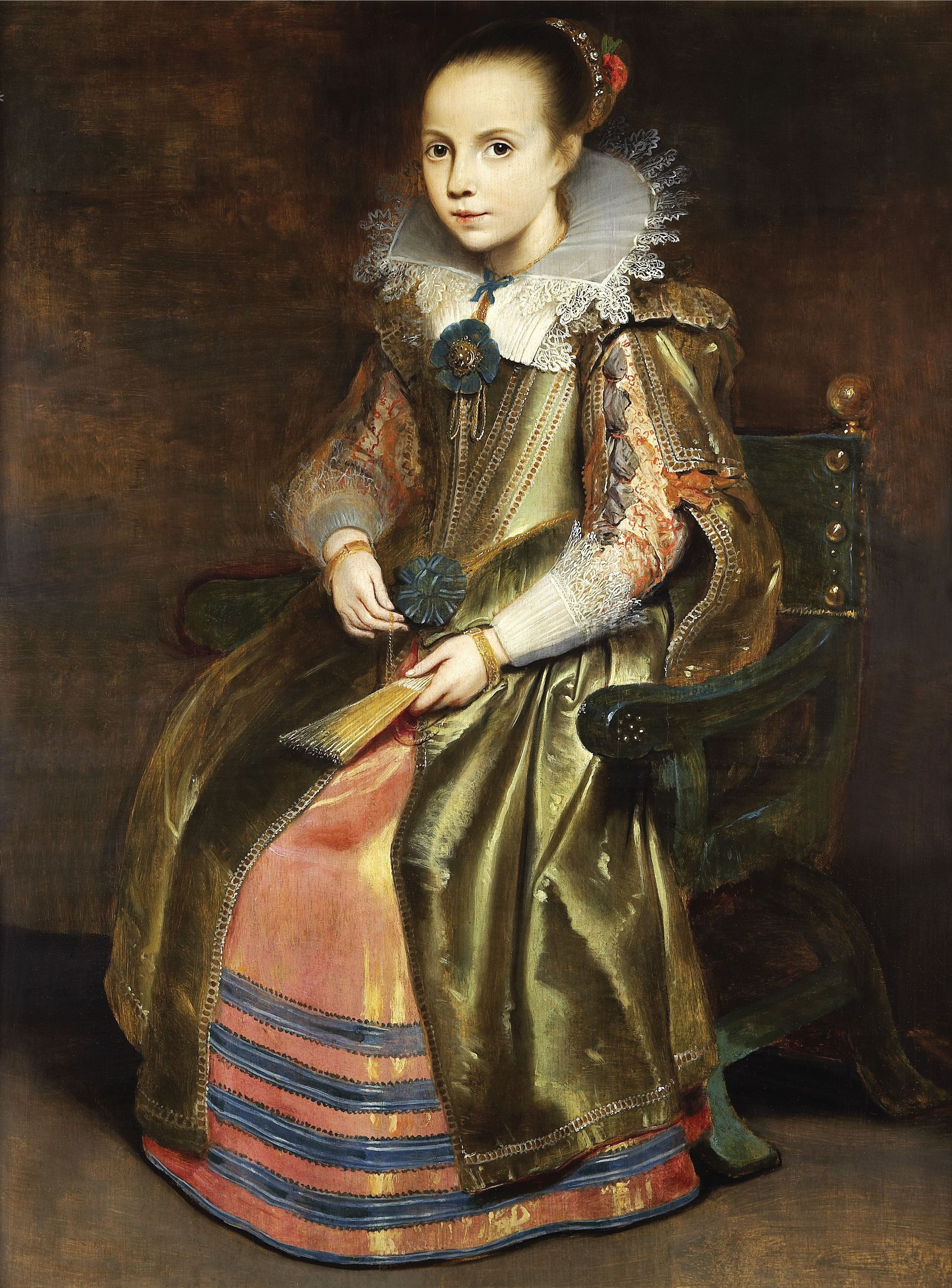
Elisabeth Vekemans als meisje by Cornelis de Vos, ca. 1625

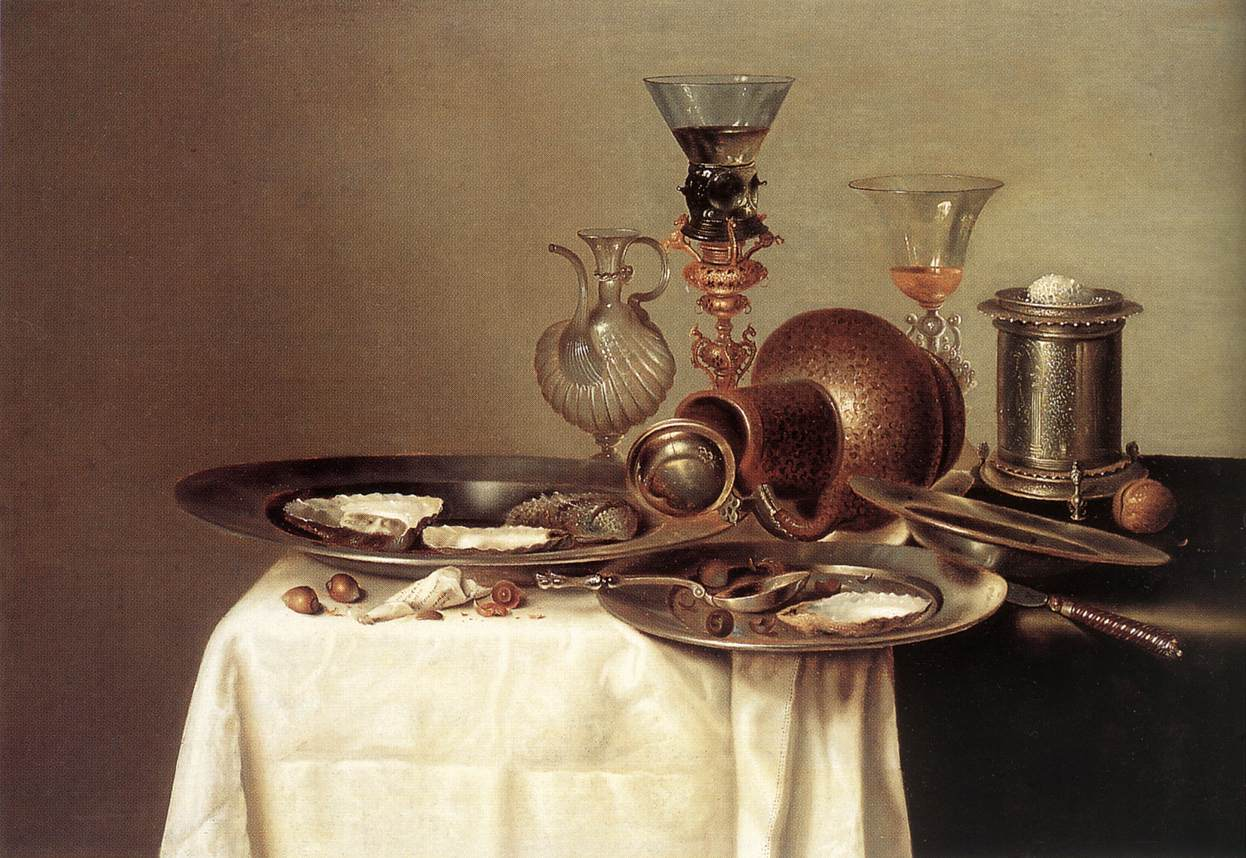
Still life by Willem Claeszoon Heda, 1637

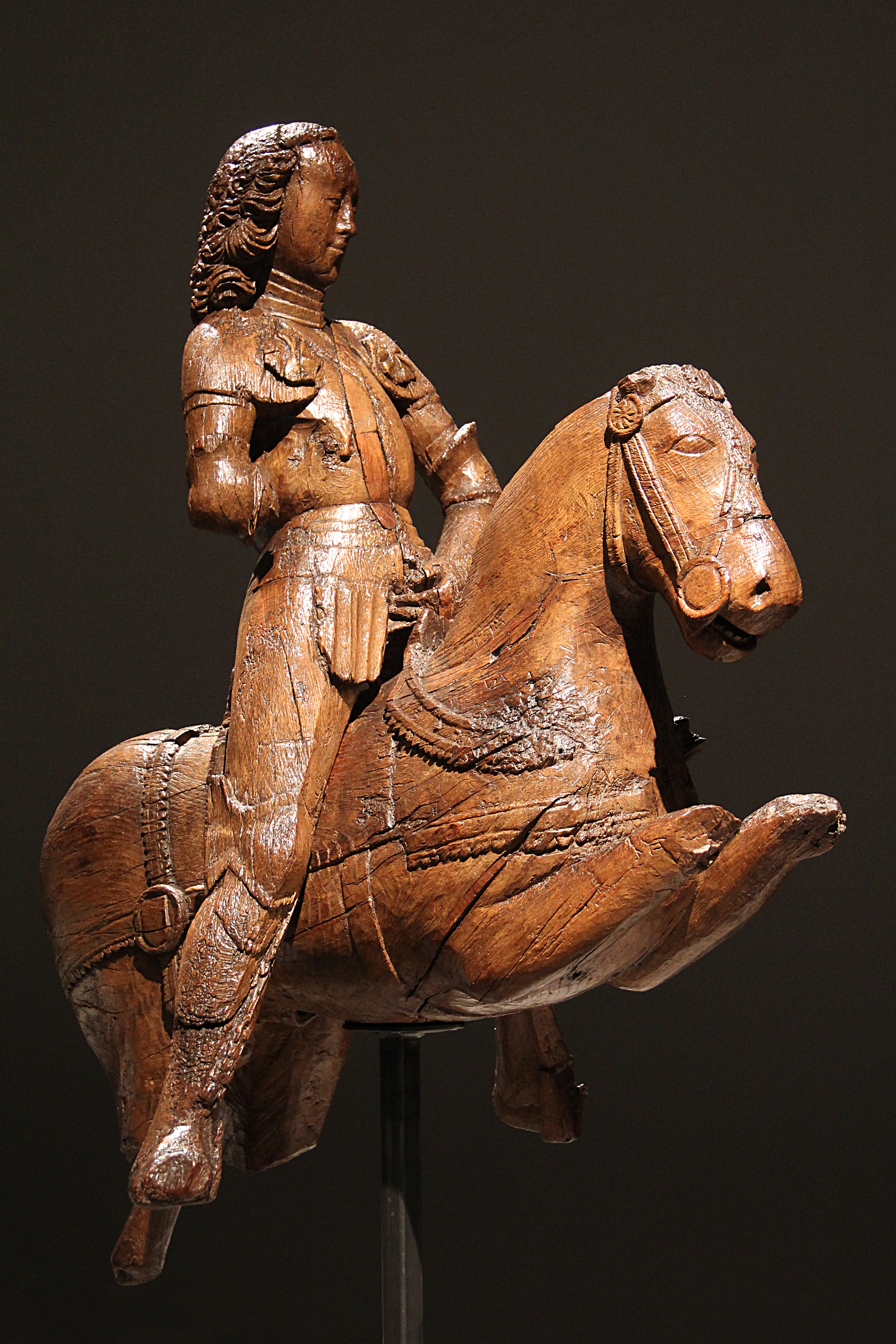
Statue of Saint George, ca. 1480-1499
